= Dodge =

American automobile manufacturer

- Type: Private (1900–1928); Division (1928–present)
- Industry: Automotive
- Founded: December 14, 1900; 125 years ago (as Dodge Brothers Company); Detroit, Michigan, U.S.
- Founders: John Francis Dodge; Horace Elgin Dodge
- Headquarters: Auburn Hills, Michigan, U.S.
- Area served: North America; South America; Europe; Middle East; Angola; Brunei; Egypt; Philippines
- Key people: Matt McAlear, CEO of Dodge brand
- Products: Muscle cars, SUVs
- Parent: Stellantis North America
- Website: dodge.com

Dodge is an American brand of automobiles and a division of Stellantis, based in Auburn Hills, Michigan. Dodge vehicles have historically included performance cars, and for much of its existence, Dodge was Chrysler's mid-priced brand above Plymouth. The Dodge main factory operated in Hamtramck, Michigan, from 1910 until it closed in January 1980.

Founded as the Dodge Brothers Company machine shop by brothers Horace Elgin Dodge and John Francis Dodge in 1900, Dodge was originally a supplier of parts and assemblies to Detroit-based automakers like Ford. They began building complete automobiles under the "Dodge Brothers" brand in 1914, predating the founding of the Chrysler Corporation. Both brothers died in 1920, and their company was sold by their families to Dillon, Read & Co. in 1925 before being sold to Chrysler in 1928.

Dodge's mainstay vehicles were trucks and full-sized passenger cars through the 1970s, but it also built compact cars such as the Dart from 1963 to 1976, and midsize cars such as the "B-Body" Coronet and Charger from 1965 to 1978. The 1973 oil embargo caused American "gas guzzler" sales to slump, prompting Chrysler to develop the Dodge Aries K platform compact and midsize cars for the 1981 model year. The K platform and its derivatives, including the Dodge Caravan, are credited with reviving Chrysler's business in the 1980s.

The Dodge brand continued through multiple ownership changes of Chrysler from 1998 until 2009, including its merger with Daimler-Benz AG between 1998 and 2007, then being sold to Cerberus Capital Management. It suffered through the 2008–2010 automotive industry crisis, resulting in the Chrysler Chapter 11 reorganization, and was ultimately acquired by Fiat.

In 2011, Dodge split off its Ram and Viper sub-brands, with Viper to be an SRT product and Ram a standalone marque. In 2014, SRT was merged back into Dodge. Later that year, the Chrysler Group was renamed FCA US LLC, coinciding with the merger of Fiat S.p.A.. The Chrysler Group was integrated into the corporate structure of Fiat Chrysler Automobiles. A subsequent merger between FCA and the PSA Group in 2021 formed Stellantis, making the Dutch-domiciled automaker the second largest in Europe after Volkswagen.

== History ==
=== Founding and early years ===
The Dodge Brothers

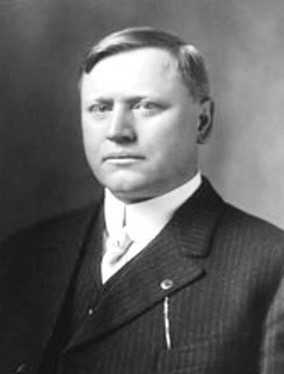
John Francis Dodge

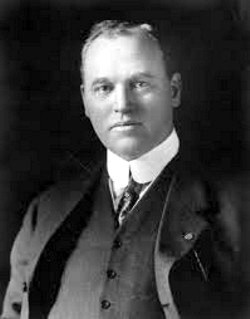
Horace Elgin Dodge

Horace and John Dodge founded the Dodge Brothers Company in Detroit in 1900, and quickly found work manufacturing precision engine and chassis components for the city's growing number of automobile firms. Chief among them were the established Olds Motor Vehicle Company and the new Ford Motor Company. Henry Ford selected the Dodge brothers to supply a wide range of components for his original Model A (1903–04) comprising the entire chassis; Ford needed to add only the body and wheels to finish the cars. Henry offered the Dodge brothers a 10% share in his new company in return for $10,000 worth of goods ($387,000 in 2025 dollars). In 1902, the brothers won a contract to produce transmissions for Ransom E. Olds' company Oldsmobile, upon which they built a solid reputation for quality and service. They rejected a second contract from Oldsmobile in 1903 to retool their plant to manufacture engines for the Ford company, which would be in debt to the brothers.

The first machine shop where the brothers worked as parts suppliers for Oldsmobile and Ford was located at the Boydell Building on Beaubien Street at Lafayette. This location was replaced by a larger facility at Hastings Street and Monroe Avenue, which is now a parking garage for the Hollywood Casino (Hastings Street itself has since been renamed Chrysler Service Drive). In 1911, the Dodge Main factory was built in Hamtramck, where it remained until 1979.

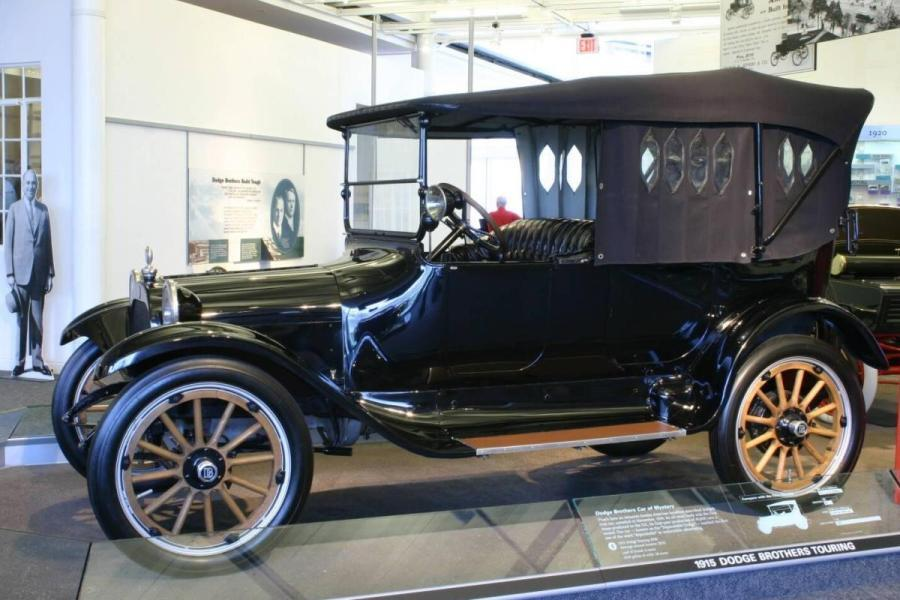
1915 Model 30-35 touring car

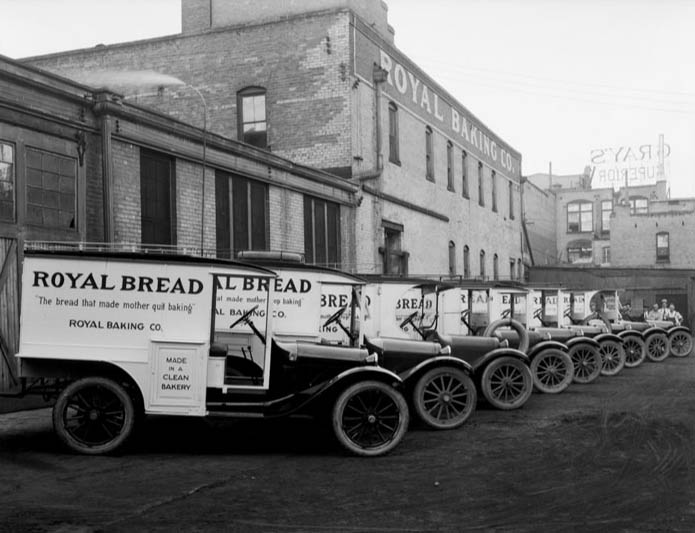
Dodge Brothers delivery trucks, Salt Lake City, 1920

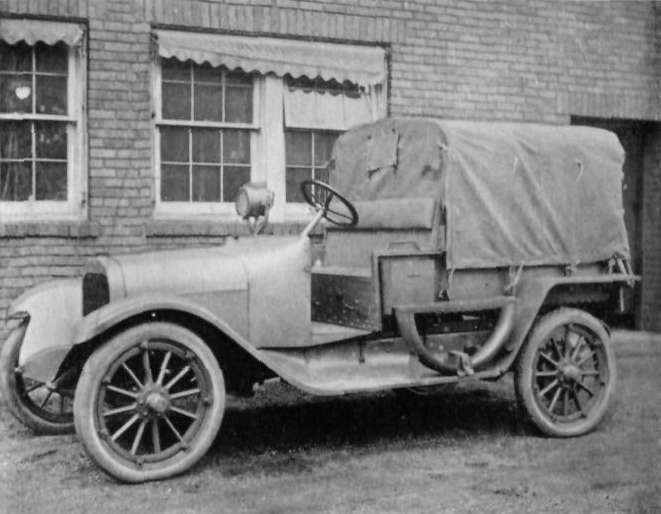
M1918 light repair truck G10, likely U.S. Army (Field Artillery Journal Sep-Oct 1920)

The Dodge Brothers Motor Company was established in 1913. By 1914, John and Horace designed and introduced the first car of their own: the four-cylinder Dodge Model 30-35 touring car. Marketed as a slightly more upscale competitor to the ubiquitous Ford Model T, it pioneered or made standard many features later taken for granted, such as all-steel bodies. The vast majority of cars worldwide still used wood-framing under steel panels. (Note: Stoneleigh and BSA used steel bodies as early as 1911.) Other innovations were 12-volt electrical systems (six-volt systems would remain the norm until the 1950s), 35 horsepower engines versus the Model T's 20 horsepower, and sliding-gear transmission (the best-selling Model T retained an antiquated planetary design until its demise in 1927). John Dodge was quoted as saying, "Someday, people who own a Ford are going to want an automobile." The company garnered a reputation for the highest quality truck, transmission, and motor parts supplied to other successful vehicles, and Dodge Brothers cars were ranked second in U.S. sales as early as 1916.

In 1916, Henry Ford stopped paying stock dividends to finance the construction of his new River Rouge complex. The Dodges filed a lawsuit to protect their annual dividends of approximately one million dollars, leading Ford to buy out his shareholders. The Dodges were paid some US$25 million.($739,678,899 in 2025 dollars) They had already earned $9,871,500 ($292,069,610 in 2025 dollars) in dividends making a total return of $34,871,500 ($1,031,748,509 in 2025 dollars) on their original $10,000 ($295,872 in 2025 dollars) investment. The Ford contract set them up for life, but they never got to spend it.

Also in 1916, the Dodge Brothers' vehicles won acclaim for their durability in military service, which began with the U.S. Army's Pancho Villa Expedition during the 1910s U.S.-Mexico Border War (the U.S. military's first operation to use truck convoys). General "Blackjack" Pershing procured a fleet of 150 to 250 Dodge Brothers vehicles for the Mexico campaign. Touring cars were used as staff and reconnaissance vehicles. Pershing himself used a Dodge touring car to keep abreast of army columns and control their movements.

During an incident in May 1916, the 6th Infantry reported a sighting of Julio Cárdenas, one of Villa's most trusted subordinates. Lt. George S. Patton led ten soldiers and two civilian guides in three Dodge Model 30 touring cars to conduct America's first motorized military raid at a ranch house in San Miguelito, Sonora. During the ensuing firefight, the party killed three men, with one identified as Cárdenas. Patton's men tied the bodies to the hoods of the Dodges, returning to headquarters in Dublán and an excited reception from American newspapermen.

Subsequently, some 12,800 Dodge cars and light trucks were used in World War I—over 8,000 touring cars, as well as 2,600 commercial vehicles, such as screen-side trucks and panel vans—serving primarily as ambulances and repair trucks.

Dodge remained the U.S. military's primary supplier of light-wheeled vehicles until the U.S. joined World War II.

=== Dodge brothers death and sale to Chrysler ===
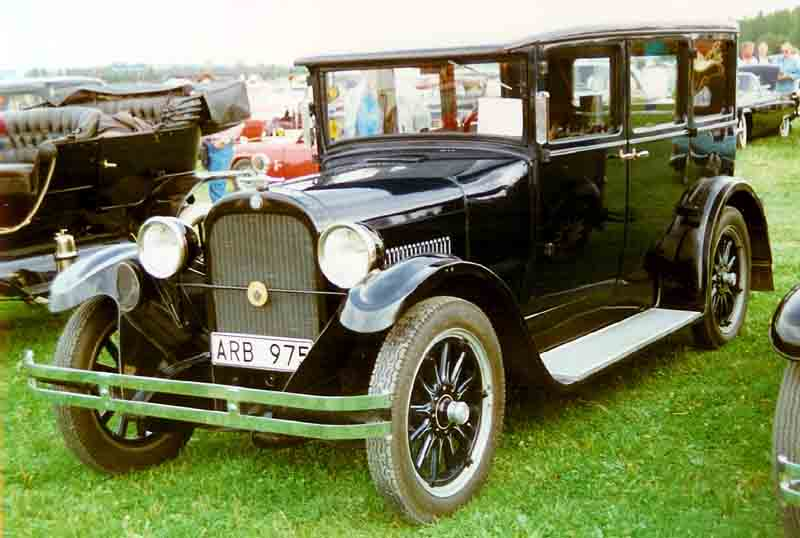
1927 Dodge Brothers Series 124 sedan

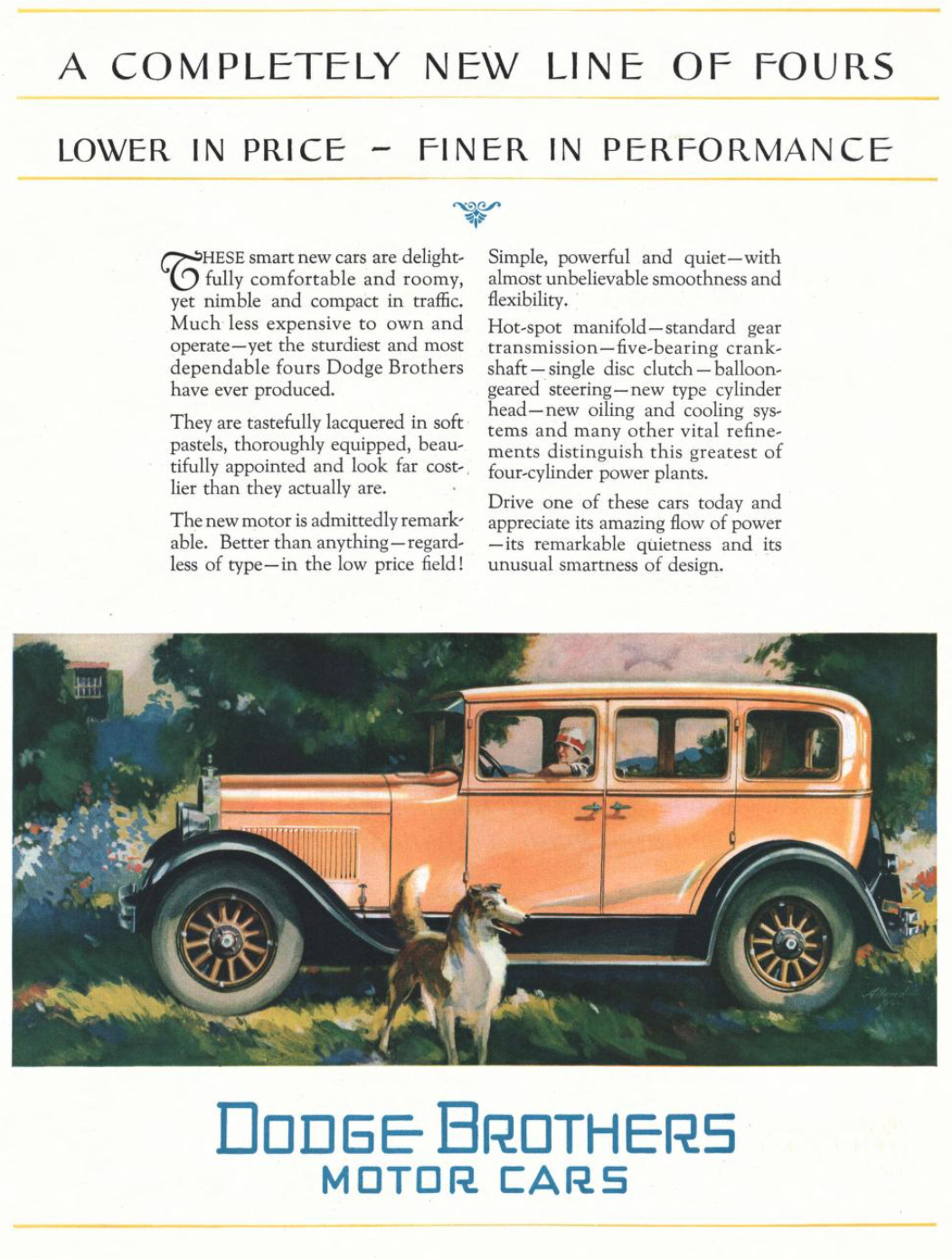
Dodge fast four (1927) Series 128 and 129

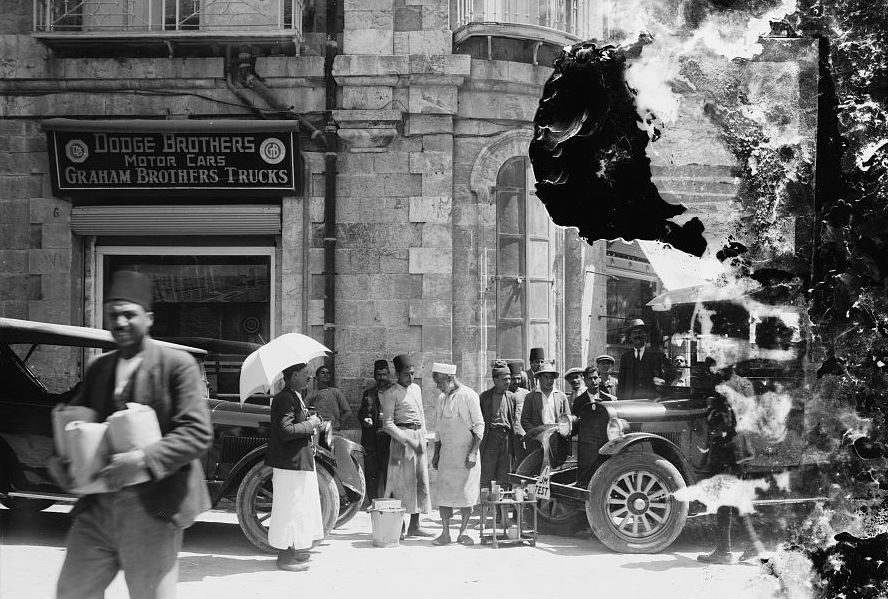
Storefront of Dodge Brothers Motor Cars & Graham Brothers Trucks dealer, ca. 1920–1935

Dodge Brothers cars continued to rank second place in U.S. sales in 1920. However, John Dodge died of pneumonia in January 1920, a complication of Spanish flu, having lungs weakened by tuberculosis 20 years earlier. Horace died in December of the same year, perhaps weakened by the Spanish flu, but the cause of death was cirrhosis of the liver (reportedly still grieved over the loss of his brother, to whom he was very close). With the loss of both founders, the Dodge Brothers Company was left in the hands of their widows, Matilda Dodge Wilson and Anna Thompson Dodge, who promoted long-time employee Frederick Haynes to the presidency. During this time, the Model 30 evolved to become the Series 116 (retaining the same basic construction and engineering features). As the 1920s progressed, Dodge gradually lost its ranking from the third best-selling automaker to seventh place in the U.S. market.

Dodge Brothers expanded its truck line and became a leading builder of light trucks. After expanding production capacity, Haynes signed a contract in 1921 for Dodge's large dealer network to exclusively market trucks with bodies built by Graham Brothers of Evansville, Indiana. The Graham truck line from then on used only Dodge-built chassis, from one- to three-ton capacity, and Dodge kept making light-duty trucks.

Development was stagnating, and sales dropped Dodge Brothers to fifth place in the industry by 1925. That year, the company was sold by the widows to the investment group Dillon, Read & Co. for no less than US$146 million, then the largest cash transaction in history ($2,680,360,531 in 2025 dollars).

Dillon, Read & Co. offered non-voting stock on the market in the new Dodge Brothers firm and, along with the sale of bonds, was able to raise $160 million ($2,937,381,404 in 2025 dollars), reaping a $14 million (net) profit ($257,020,873 in 2025 dollars). All voting stock was retained by the investment group. Frederick Haynes remained as company head until E.G. Wilmer was named board chairman in November 1926. Wilmer was a banker with no auto experience, and Haynes remained as president. Changes to the car, save for superficial things like trim levels and colors, remained minimal until 1927, when the new Senior six-cylinder line was introduced. The four-cylinder line was renamed the Fast Four line until it was dropped in favor of two lighter six-cylinder models (the Standard Six and Victory Six) for 1928.

On October 1, 1925, Dodge Brothers, Inc. acquired a 51% interest in Graham Brothers, Inc. for $13 million ($238,662,239 in 2025 dollars), followed by the remaining 49% on May 1, 1926. Haynes purchased all of Graham's truck production, and the Graham branch took charge of all of Dodge's truck manufacturing in 1926. Until the purchase by Chrysler, all trucks were Graham badged. A total of 60,000 trucks were built in 1927. The three Graham brothers, Robert, Joseph, and Ray, assumed management positions in Dodge Brothers before departing in early 1927. The brothers established the Graham-Paige company to build a new line of Graham passenger cars.

Despite this, Dodge Brothers' sales had dropped to 13th place in the industry by 1927, and Dillon, Read & Co. began looking for someone to buy the company. In 1928, Dodge was sold to the new Chrysler Corporation, who had attempted to purchase the company two years earlier, in a stock transfer instead of cash for $170 million ($3,187,500,000 in 2025 dollars). With its purchase of Dodge, Chrysler gained the Dodge Factory and dealership network to better compete in the low-priced car field against Ford and Chevrolet, and Dodge progressed from 13th to seventh place in sales by 1928. On January 2, 1929, Chrysler announced that the Graham Badge had been dropped, and Chrysler was now building Dodge Brothers trucks.

=== Pre-war years ===
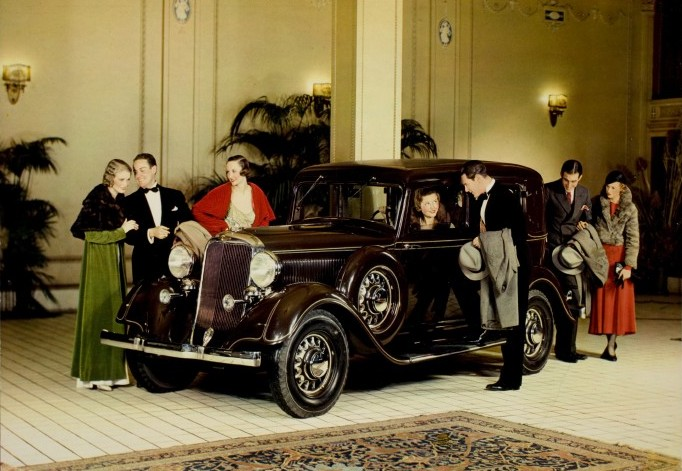
Dodge aimed for the luxury market in this advertisement for the 1933 model Eight.

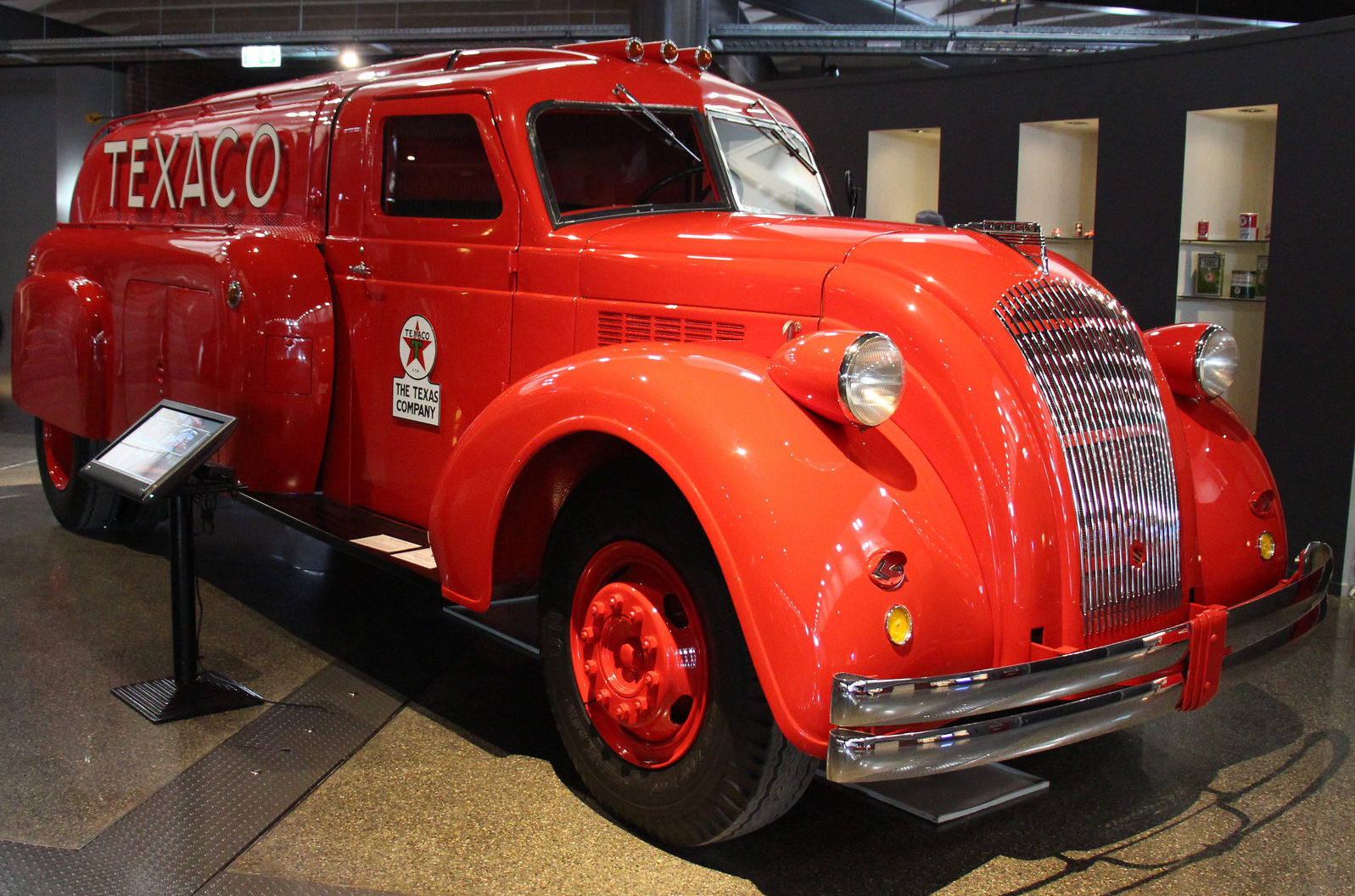
1940 Dodge Airflow Texaco tanker truck

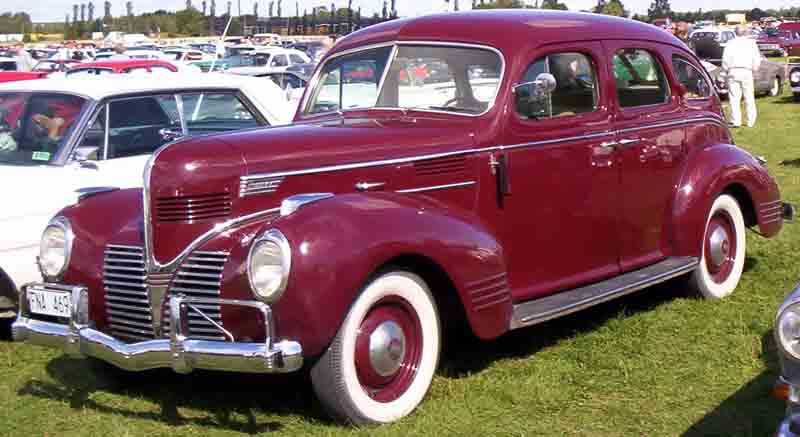
Dodge D11 Luxury Liner 4-Door Sedan 1939

To fit better the Chrysler lineup, alongside low-priced Plymouth and medium-priced DeSoto, Dodge's lineup for early 1930 was trimmed down to a core group of two lines and thirteen models (from three lines and nineteen models just over a year prior). Prices started just above those of DeSoto, but were somewhat less than top-of-the-line Chrysler, in a small-scale recreation of General Motors' "step-up" marketing concept. As Plymouth cars were sold at Chrysler dealerships, Dodge-branded vehicles were sold as a lower-cost alternative to DeSoto. DeSoto and Dodge would swap places in the market for the 1933 model year, with Dodge dropping down between Plymouth and DeSoto.

For 1930, Dodge took another step up by adding a new eight-cylinder line to replace the existing Senior six-cylinder. This basic format of a dual line with Six and Eight models continued until 1933, and the cars were gradually streamlined and lengthened in step with prevailing trends of the day. The Dodge Eight was replaced by a larger DeLuxe Six for 1934, which was dropped for 1935. A long-wheelbase edition of the remaining Six was added for 1936, and would remain a part of the lineup for many years. In 1932, to enhance production, Chrysler built a factory in Los Angeles, California, where Chrysler, DeSoto, Dodge and Plymouth vehicles were built until the factory closed in 1971.

The Dodge line, along with most of the corporation's output, was restyled in the so-called "Wind Stream" look for 1935. This was a mild form of streamlining, which saw sales jump remarkably over the previous year (even though Dodge as a whole still dropped to fifth place for the year after two years of holding down fourth). Dodge did not share the radical Airflow styling that was the cause of depressed sales of Chryslers and DeSotos from 1934 until 1937, as a passenger sedan, but it was used on commercial trucks for a short time. Dodge (along with the rest of Chrysler) added safety features such as a smooth, flat dashboard with no protruding knobs, curved in-door handles, and padded front-seat backs for the benefit of the rear-seat occupants.

Another major restyle arrived for the 25th anniversary 1939 models, which Dodge dubbed the Luxury Liner series. These were once again completely redesigned, with new bodies for 1940, again in 1941, and a refreshing for 1942. However, just after the 1942 models were introduced, Japan's attack on Pearl Harbor forced the shutdown of Dodge's passenger car assembly lines in favor of war production in February 1942. 1941 saw the introduction of Fluid Drive for Dodge cars, which eliminated stalling or bucking if the clutch was released too quickly. This feature put a fluid coupling in between the engine and the clutch, although the driver still had to shift gears manually.

=== World War II ===
Chrysler was prolific in its production of war materiel, especially from 1942 until 1945. Dodge in particular was well known to both average citizens and thankful soldiers for their tough military-spec light trucks and WC54 ambulances. Dodge America – on paper under the Fargo Trucks name (in U.S. government contracts) (Note: Within the Chrysler Corporation, the Fargo Division handled government contracts, but the trucks were all built by Dodge.) – built over 400,000 trucks for the war, in its nearly new (1938) Warren truck plant at Mound Road near Detroit, Michigan. Starting with the quickly converted VC and VF series for 1940, Dodge built mostly light 4x4, but also light-medium 6x6 WC series trucks that evolved out of the VC series. Smaller numbers of other models were built for China and Russia under Lend-Lease. Additionally, Chrysler Canada was enlisted to crank out another 180,000 Dodge trucks for the British and the Commonwealth militaries, over three-quarters of which were three-ton trucks to be used in the CMP role.

Dodge readily built upon the reputation of the WC series for itself by carrying it over into civilian models after the war, beginning with the successful Power Wagon, introduced with minimal modification almost immediately after the war, in 1945, for the 1946 model year.

=== Post-war years ===
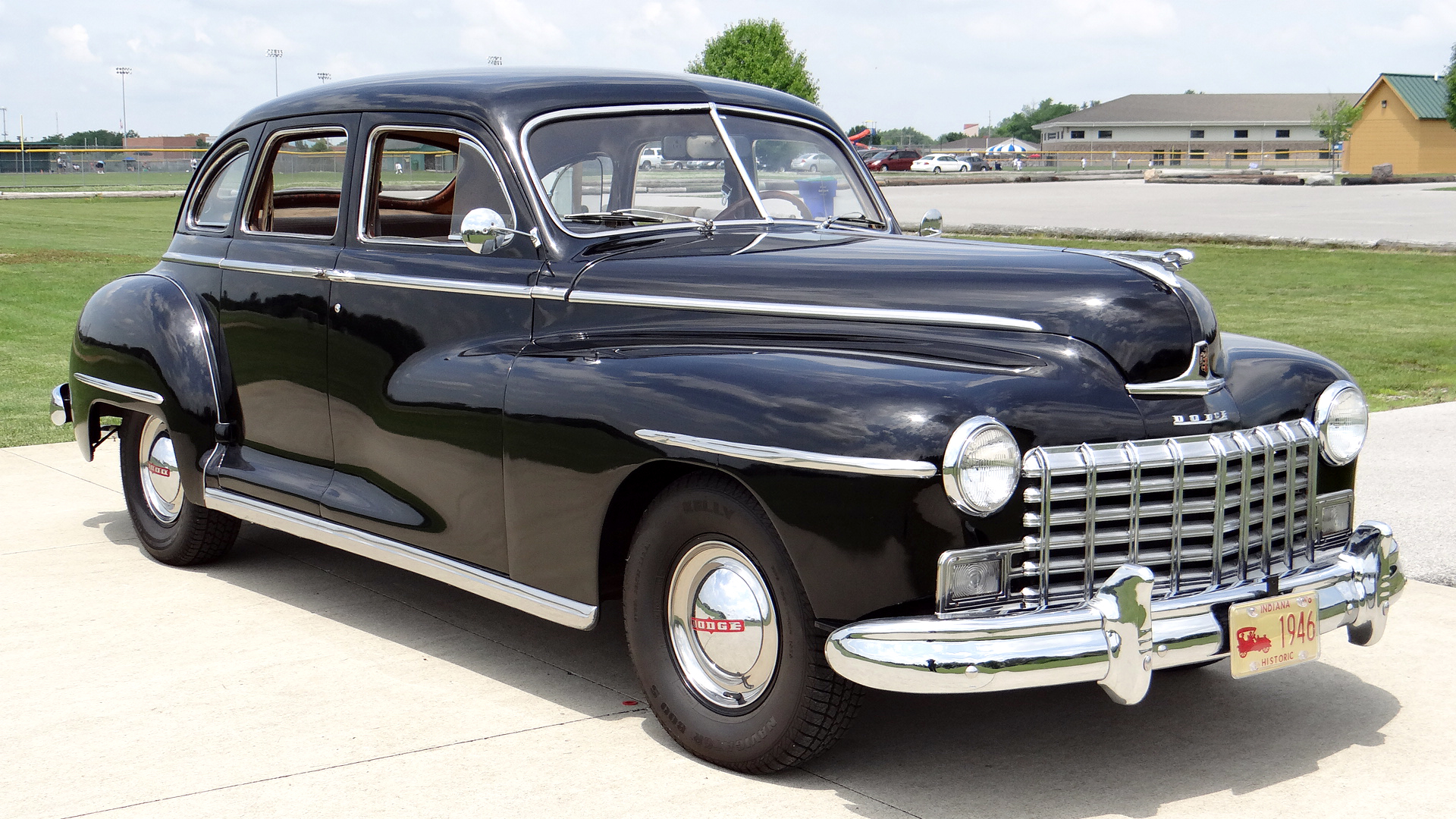
1946 Dodge Custom 4-door sedan

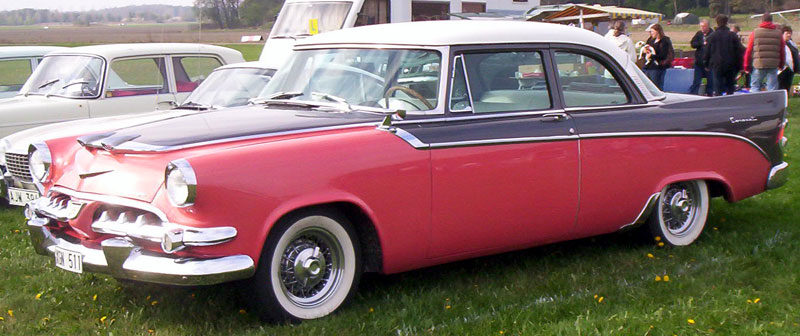
1956 Dodge Coronet

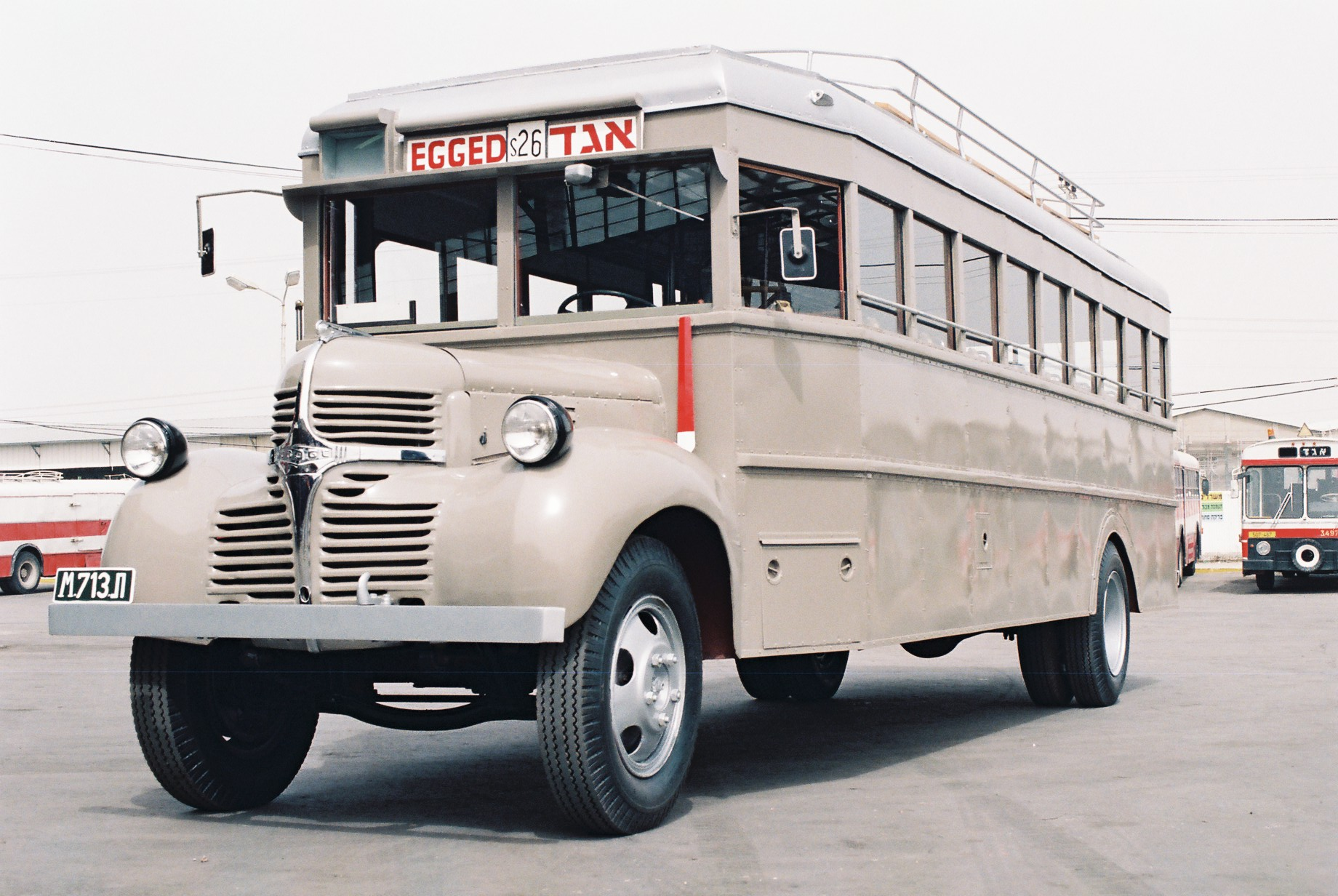
1946 Dodge FK6 bus

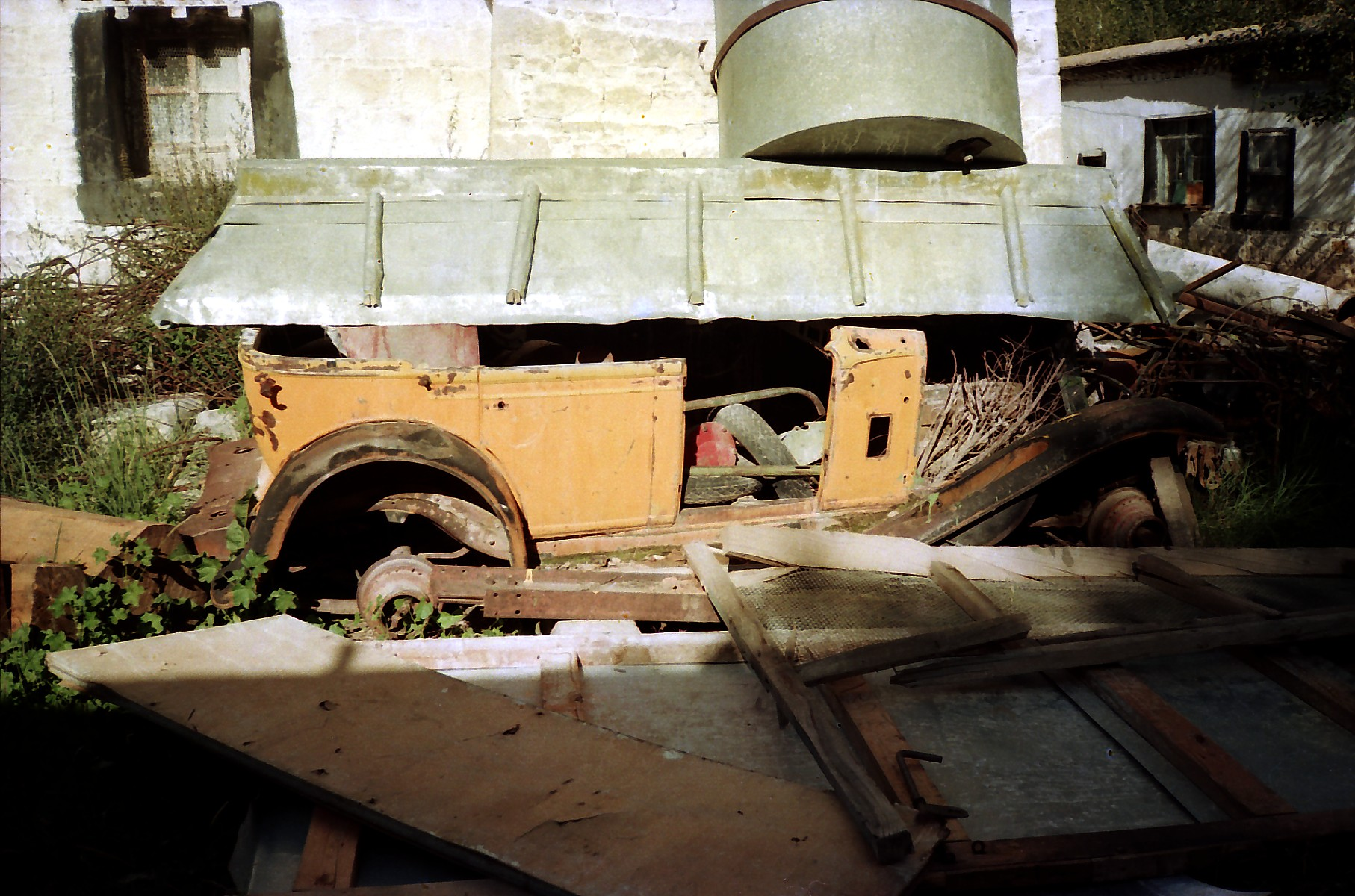
Remains of Dalai Lama's Dodge car in Lhasa, 1993

By late 1945, civilian production at Dodge was restarted in time for the 1946 model year. The "seller's market" of the early post-war years, brought on by the lack of any new cars throughout the war, meant that every automaker found it easy to sell vehicles regardless of any drawbacks they might have. Like almost every other automaker, Dodge sold lightly facelifted revisions of its 1942 design through the 1948 model year. As before, these were a single series of six-cylinder models with two trim levels (basic Deluxe or plusher Custom). From 1949 to 1954, Fluid Drive could be combined with "Gyro-Matic", a semi-automatic transmission that reduced (but did not eliminate) the need to shift gears.

Year	Production	Model
1948	240,547	Dodge Custom
1949	298,053	Dodge Coronet, Dodge Custom, Dodge Wayfarer, Dodge Meadowbrook
1950	331,220	Dodge Coronet , Dodge Wayfarer , Dodge Meadowbrook
1951	336,656	Dodge Coronet, Dodge Regent, Dodge Wayfarer, Dodge Meadowbrook
1952	268,094	Dodge Coronet, Dodge Wayfarer, Dodge Meadowbrook
1953	301,827	Dodge Coronet, Dodge Meadowbrook
1954	151,761	Dodge Coronet, Dodge Meadowbrook, Dodge Royal
1955	316,584	Dodge Coronet, Dodge Royal
1956	205,820	Dodge Coronet, Dodge Royal
1957	293,616	Dodge Coronet, Dodge Royal
1958	114,206	Dodge Coronet, Dodge Royal
1959	192,798	Dodge Coronet, Dodge Royal

Styling was not initially Dodge's strong point during this period, but began to change by 1953 under the direction of corporate design chief Virgil Exner. However, the deluxe Coronet series, introduced for 1949, offered extra luxury as the top-of-the-line. The Coronet Diplomat, Dodge's first pillarless hardtop coupe, was new for 1950, at least a year before Ford, Plymouth, and other popular car makes offered it. At the same time, Dodge also introduced its first V8 engine, the Red Ram Hemi, a smaller version of the original design of the famed Chrysler Hemi. The new 1953 bodies were smaller and based on the Plymouth. For 1954, sales dropped, and the stubby styling did not go over well with the public. 1954 also saw the introduction of the fully automatic PowerFlite transmission.

In 1954, Chrysler borrowed $250 million ($2,997,211,896 in 2025 dollars) from Prudential to finance expansion, acquisition, and updating the outdated styling of their car lines that contributed to Chrysler's failure to benefit from the post-war boom just as General Motors and Ford had.

Exner led the development of the new corporate "Forward Look" styling of 1955, which began a new era for Dodge. With steadily upgraded styling and ever-stronger engines every year through 1960, Dodge found a ready market for its products as Americans discovered the joys of freeway travel. This situation improved when Dodge introduced a new line of Dodges called the Dart to do battle against Ford, Chevrolet, and Plymouth. The result was that Dodge sales in the middle price class collapsed. Special and regional models were sold as well, including the La Femme (a white and orchid-trimmed hardtop marketed towards women) and the Texan, a gold-accented Dodge sold in Texas. 1957 saw the introduction of a new automatic transmission, three-speed TorqueFlite. Both PowerFlite and TorqueFlite were controlled by mechanical push-buttons until 1965. 1956 saw the introduction of the four-door pillarless hardtop (the same year most other makes offered this body style) in all three Dodge series: Custom Royal, Royal, and Coronet. Dodge's pillarless models were all badged "Lancer".

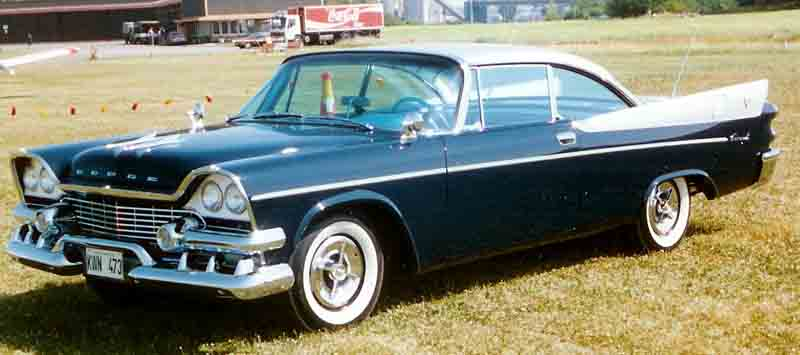
1958 Dodge Coronet Lancer hardtop coupe

Dodge entered the compact car field for the 1961 model year with the Lancer, a variation on Plymouth's Valiant. It was not initially successful but the successor, the 1963 Dart range would prove to be one of the division's top sellers for many years.

For 1962, Chrysler made an ill-advised move to downsize the Dodge and Plymouth full-size lines, which resulted in a loss of sales. However, they turned this around in 1965 by turning those former full-sizes into "new" mid-size models; Dodge revived the Coronet nameplate in this way, and later added a sporty fastback version called the Charger that became both a sales leader and a winner on the NASCAR circuit. This style dominated the racetracks for four years, and the aerodynamic improvements changed the face of NASCAR racing.

Full-size models evolved gradually during this time. After Dodge dealers complained about not having a true full-size car in the fall of 1961, the Custom 880 was hurried into production. The Custom 880 used the 1962 Chrysler Newport body with the 1961 Dodge front end and interior. Production on the 880 continued until 1965, when the completely new full-size Polara entered the medium price class and the Monaco was added as the top series. The Polara and Monaco were changed mostly in appearance for the next ten years or so. Unique "fuselage" styling was employed from 1969 to 1973, and then was toned down again for model years 1974 through 1977.

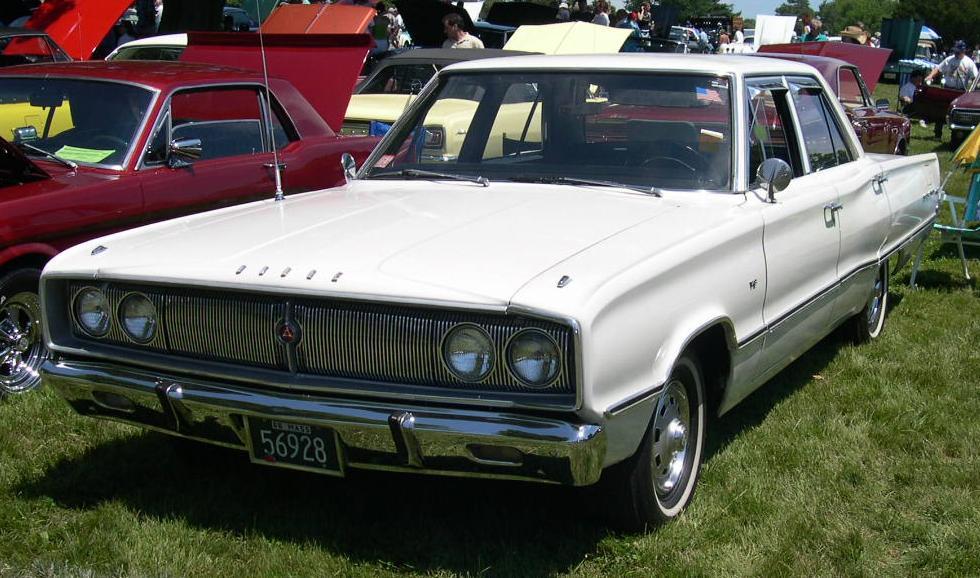
1967 Dodge Coronet 440 sedan

Dodge targeted the muscle car market of the late 1960s and early 1970s. Along with the Charger, models like the Coronet R/T and Super Bee were available for buyers seeking performance. For the 1970 model year, Dodge entered the pony car market segment with the Challenger coupe and convertible. The Challenger was available with economy I6 engines and numerous trims and options up to the "race-ready" Hemi V8.

To offer a wider range of cars during the 1970s, Dodge partnered with Mitsubishi to market their subcompact as the Colt, positioned to compete with the AMC Gremlin, Chevrolet Vega, and Ford Pinto. Chrysler would come to rely heavily on Dodge's relationship with Mitsubishi. At the same time, Dodge marketed a version of the Plymouth Duster, badge-engineered as the Dodge Demon. It was inexpensive, but with I6 and V8 engines, the Demon could not achieve the fuel economy of the four-cylinder Colt, and sold in much fewer numbers than the Duster.

=== 1973–1980 ===
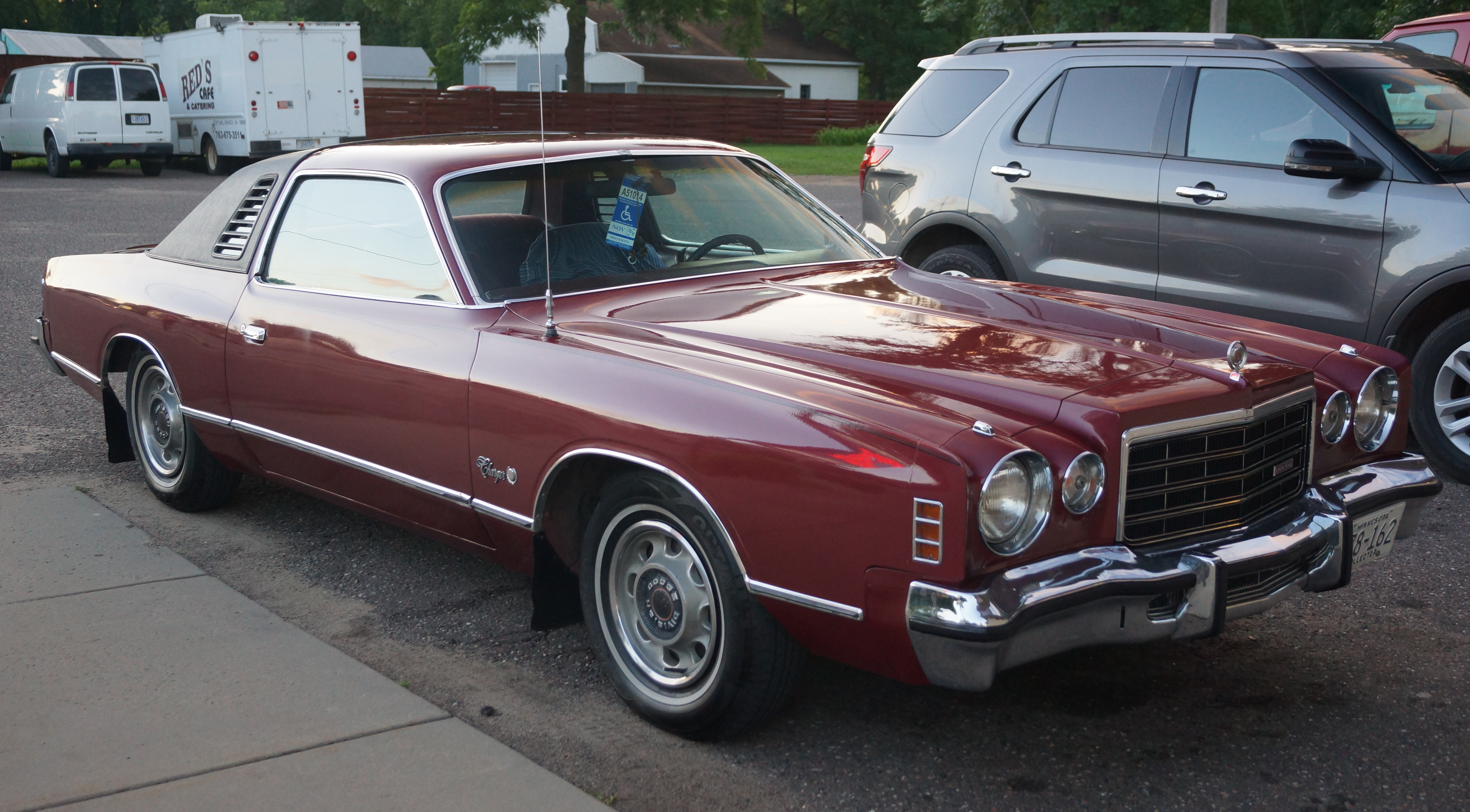
1975 Dodge Charger

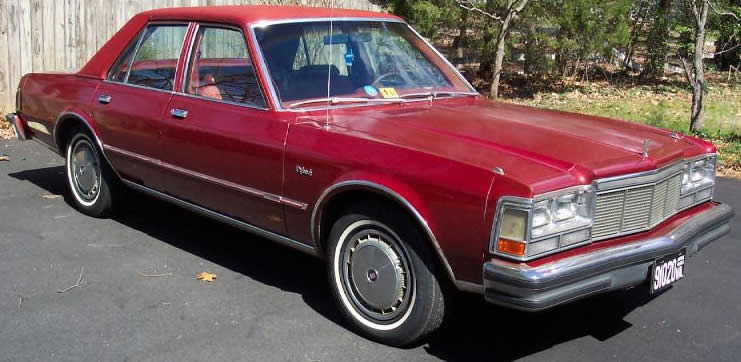
1977 Dodge Diplomat sedan

The 1973 oil crisis caused significant changes at Dodge, as well as Chrysler as a whole. Except for the Colt and Slant Six models of the Dart, Dodge's lineup was viewed as uneconomical. Although this problem affected American automakers, Chrysler did not have the resources to respond to the changes in the marketplace. While General Motors and Ford began downsizing their largest cars, Chrysler (and Dodge) was slow to make change.

Chrysler was able to use some of its other resources. Borrowing the recently introduced Horizon from Chrysler's European division, Dodge was able to get its new Omni subcompact on the market fairly quickly. At the same time, they increased the number of models imported from Mitsubishi starting in 1971. First was a smaller Colt (based on Mitsubishi's Galant line), then a revival of the Challenger (Dodge Challenger) in 1976 as a compact two-door hardtop with a four-cylinder engine.

The 1975 model year saw the Dodge Charger and Chrysler Cordoba (the latter of which had replaced the Plymouth Satellite Sebring) share the same new body based on the B platform. The Charger SE (Special Edition) was the only model offered, and came with a wide variety engines from the 318 cu in (5.2 L) "LA" series small block V8 to three versions of 400 cu in (6.6 L) big block V8. The standard engine was the 360 cu in (5.9 L) 2-bbl small block, along with the code E58 4-bbl and dual exhaust high-performance version (225 hp) available as an option. Sales in 1975 amounted to 30,812.

1976 was the Dart's final year in the North American market. The rear-view mirror was mounted on the windshield rather than from the roof. Front disc brakes became standard equipment on January 1, 1976 in accord with more stringent U.S. federal brake performance requirements, and a new foot-operated parking brake replaced the under-dash T-handle used since the Dart's 1963 introduction as a compact car. The grille's parking lamps were cast in amber, whereas the previous years had clear lenses with amber-colored bulbs. The Dart Sport 360 was dropped as a separate model in 1976, but the 360 cu in (5.9 L) four-barrel, dual exhaust (without catalytic converters) V8 was a $376 option (except in California) for the $3,370 Dart Sport V8 models with automatic transmission. In its April 1976 issue, Car and Driver magazine tested the Dart Sport 360, pitting it against the Chevrolet Corvette and Pontiac Trans Am, and found its top speed of 121.6 mph (195.7 km/h) to be second to the Corvette's 124.5 mph (200.4 km/h).

Dodge's replacement for the Dart was the Aspen, introduced in mid-1975 as a 1976 model. This new design featured lighter weight resulting in slightly improved fuel economy; it also had more interior and trunk room than the Dart. Front suspension was a new design; it featured transverse-mounted torsion bars which not only improved ride, but cornering as well. Its boxy styling gave the impression of a larger car. However, sales had to be shared with the virtually identical Plymouth Volare. Both cars were available in coupe, sedan, and station wagon body styles, and in both base and deluxe trim. Despite its virtues, customers soon found out about the Aspen's rush to market when they saw their cars experience severe body rust within a couple of years on the road. Engine and drive train problems plagued the Aspen/Volare twins, and although the problems were largely worked out within a few years, the final Aspens were produced for the 1980 model year. This car was available with either a 225 cubic-inch Slant Six or a small block V8 displacing 318 or 360 cubic inches.

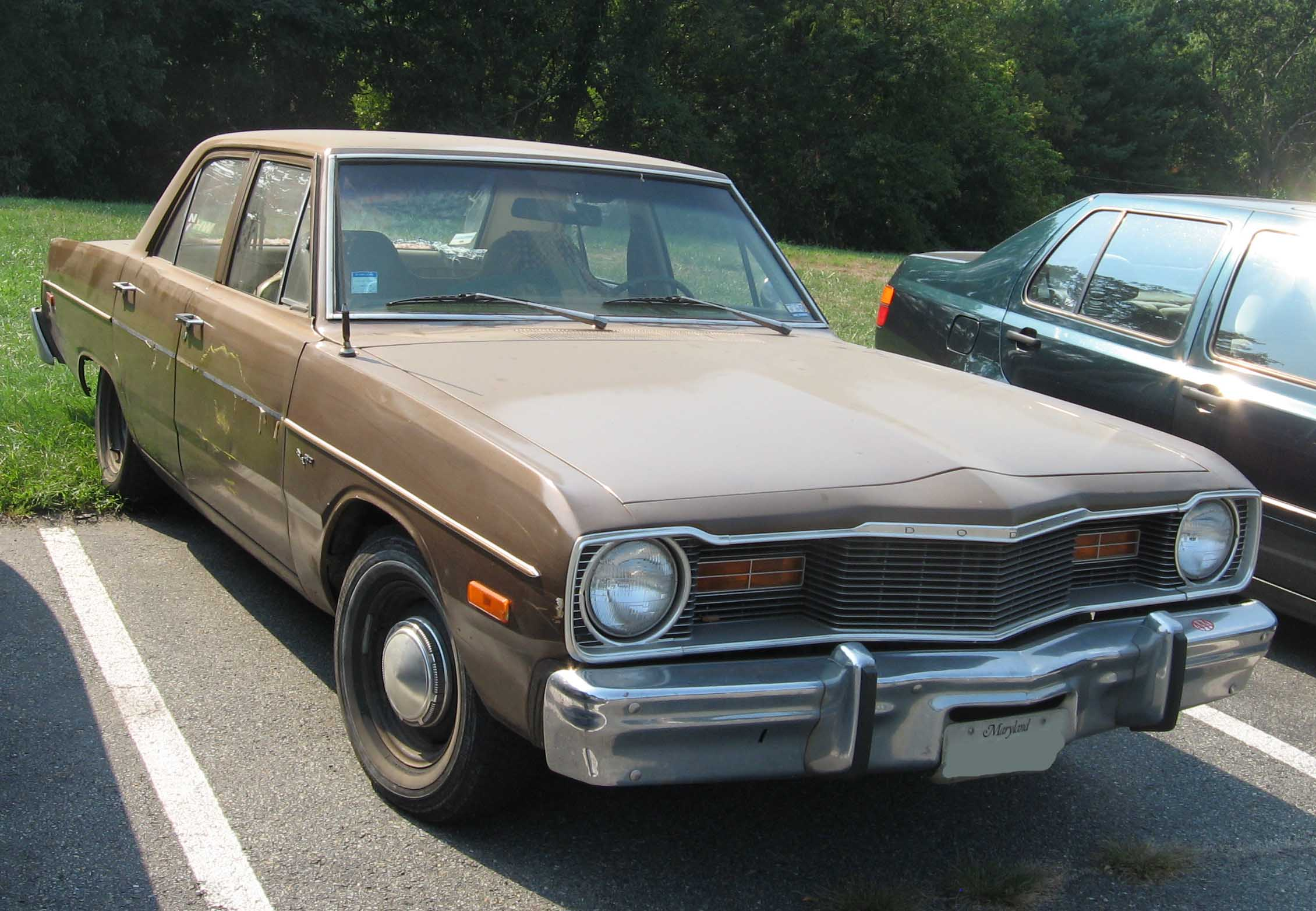
1976 Dodge Dart 4-door sedan

1976 was the final model year for the Dodge Coronet (at least so far as the Coronet name went), and its body style choices were relegated to just only two four-door models: the four-door wagon and the four-door sedan. The former two-door Coronet model, which appeared for just the previous model year, was replaced by the two-door Dodge Charger Sport model, which itself appeared for only one model year. For the 1977 model year, the mid-size Coronet would be renamed the Dodge Monaco, and was given stacked rectangular headlights and other minor cosmetic changes that would provide a prompt sales boost. The Coronet and Charger were effectively replaced by the Diplomat, a fancier Aspen, for 1977.

During that same model year, the full-size Dodge Monaco would be renamed the Dodge Royal Monaco, which would appear for just one model year only. Both Dodge and Plymouth would discontinue all production of any more full-size models (which would include the Royal Monaco's entire Plymouth Gran Fury counterpart lineup as well). It lost sales every year until it was replaced by the St. Regis, an upsized Coronet for 1979, following a one-year absence from the big car market. During the 1978 model year, the mid-size Dodge Monaco (as well as its entire Plymouth Fury counterpart lineup) would make its final appearance (for all during the remainder of the 1970s).

While the Aspen received accolades for styling and handling, the build quality was problematic, sullying the car's reputation at a time when sales were desperately needed. It was noted for having problems with its carburetors which resulted in frequent stalling. The Aspen also had difficulties in starting, even after leaving the engine off for several minutes. This resulted in several recalls.

For 1978, the Dodge Magnum was introduced to supplement the Dodge Charger. It was sold in two forms–the "XE" and the "GT"–and was the last vehicle to use the long-running Chrysler B platform. The appearance was somewhat of a rounded-off Charger, and was designed to be more aerodynamic and eligible for NASCAR races. Styling features included four rectangular headlights behind retractable clear covers, with narrow opera windows, and an optional T-bar or power sunroof. The Magnum was well-featured with power steering, brakes, and seats; the suspension included Chrysler's standard adjustable, longitudinal torsion bars, lower trailing links, and front and rear anti-sway bars. The base engine was the 318 cu in (5.2 L) V8 with Lean-Burn, while two and four-barrel carbureted 360 cu in (5.9 L) and 400 cu in (6.6 L) V8s were optional; weight was nearly 3,900 lb (1,800 kg).

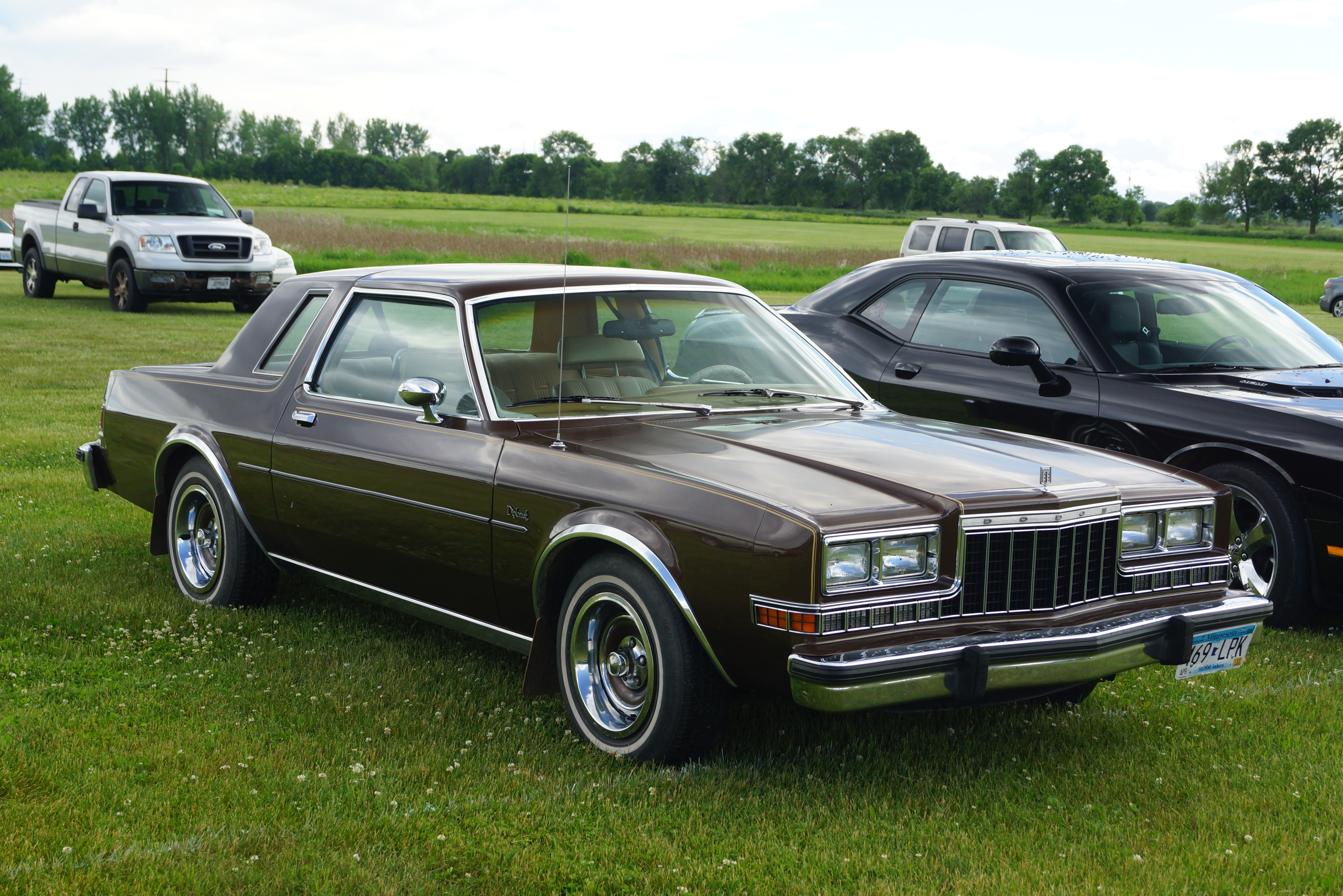
1980 Dodge Diplomat coupe

The Omni and Horizon were introduced at a time when Chrysler was on the brink of bankruptcy and sought government support to survive. In 1978, Chrysler beat Ford and General Motors to the market with a domestically produced front-wheel drive car to challenge the Volkswagen Rabbit. However, the L-bodies miscarried at first, since 1978 was a year of strong sales for larger cars and demand for compacts and subcompacts noticeably shrank. These initial poor sales of the cars contributed to Chrysler's financial woes at the time, but when the company requested federal assistance, the Omni was an important piece of evidence that they were attempting to compete with imports and build small, fuel-efficient cars and might be worth saving. For the three years leading up to the introduction of Chrysler's K-cars, the Omni/Horizon was Chrysler's best-selling model line.

Everything came to a head in 1979 when Chrysler's new chairman, Lee Iacocca, requested and received federal loan guarantees from the United States Congress to save the company from having to file for bankruptcy. With a Federal Loan in hand, Chrysler quickly set to work on new models that would leave the past behind, while reorganizing to pay the government loan which stood at 29%.

The Dodge Mirada, a mid-sized, rear-wheel drive coupe, was manufactured and marketed from the 1980 through 1983 model years, sharing the Chrysler J platform along with its badge-engineered variants, the second-generation Chrysler Cordoba and the Imperial. Production of the Mirada reached just under 53,000 units, staying relatively unchanged over four years of production, except for paint colors and engines. The Mirada was marketed as a sporty personal luxury car with limited advertising and marketing during a period when Chrysler was in deep financial difficulty.

=== 1981–1990 ===
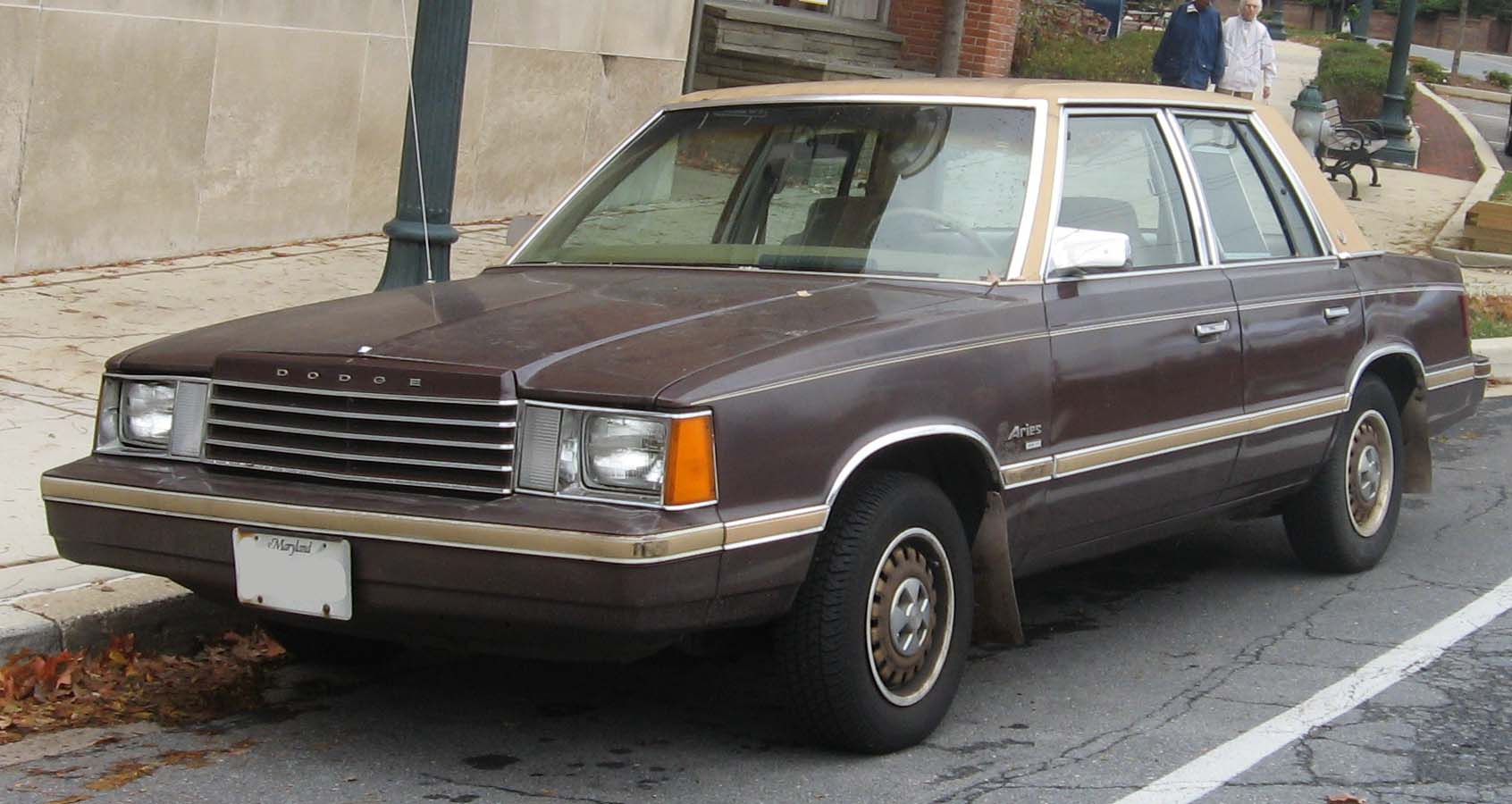
1981–1982 Dodge Aries Special Edition

The first fruit of Chrysler's crash development program was the "K-Car", the Dodge version of which was the Dodge Aries. This basic, durable front-wheel drive platform spawned a whole range of new models at Dodge during the 1980s, including the groundbreaking Dodge Caravan. Lee Iacocca and Hal Sperlich developed their idea for this type of vehicle during their tenure at Ford. Henry Ford II rejected the idea (and a prototype) of a minivan in 1974. Iacocca followed Sperlich to Chrysler, where they created what was internally designated the T-115 minivan, a prototype that was to become the Caravan and Voyager, known in initial marketing as the Magic-wagons. Chrysler introduced the Dodge Caravan and the Plymouth Voyager in November 1983 for the 1984 model year, using the Chrysler S platform, an extended derivative of the Chrysler K platform. The Caravan not only helped save Chrysler as a serious, high-volume American automaker, but also helped establish the minivan as an entirely new market segment that supplanted the role of the station wagon.

By 1981, Chrysler was switching to smaller front-wheel drive designs. However, its older, larger rear-wheel drive Dodge Diplomat (as well as the Chrysler LeBaron and Fifth Avenue) continued to sell. Diplomats built from mid-1988 until the end of production were among the first Chrysler-built products to have a driver's side airbag as standard equipment, some two model years before the remainder of Chrysler's lineup (they were also among the only cars at the time to offer a tilt steering column with an airbag). As the 1980s progressed, fewer private customers purchased the Diplomat, and the M-body was eventually dropped during the 1989 model year. Although sales were strong, Chrysler CEO Lee Iacocca held a low opinion of the M-body line as a relic of the pre-K car era and declined to invest any money in them. Dodge would not market another truly full-size car (at least based upon EPA passenger volume statistics) until the Monaco debuted as a 1990 model.

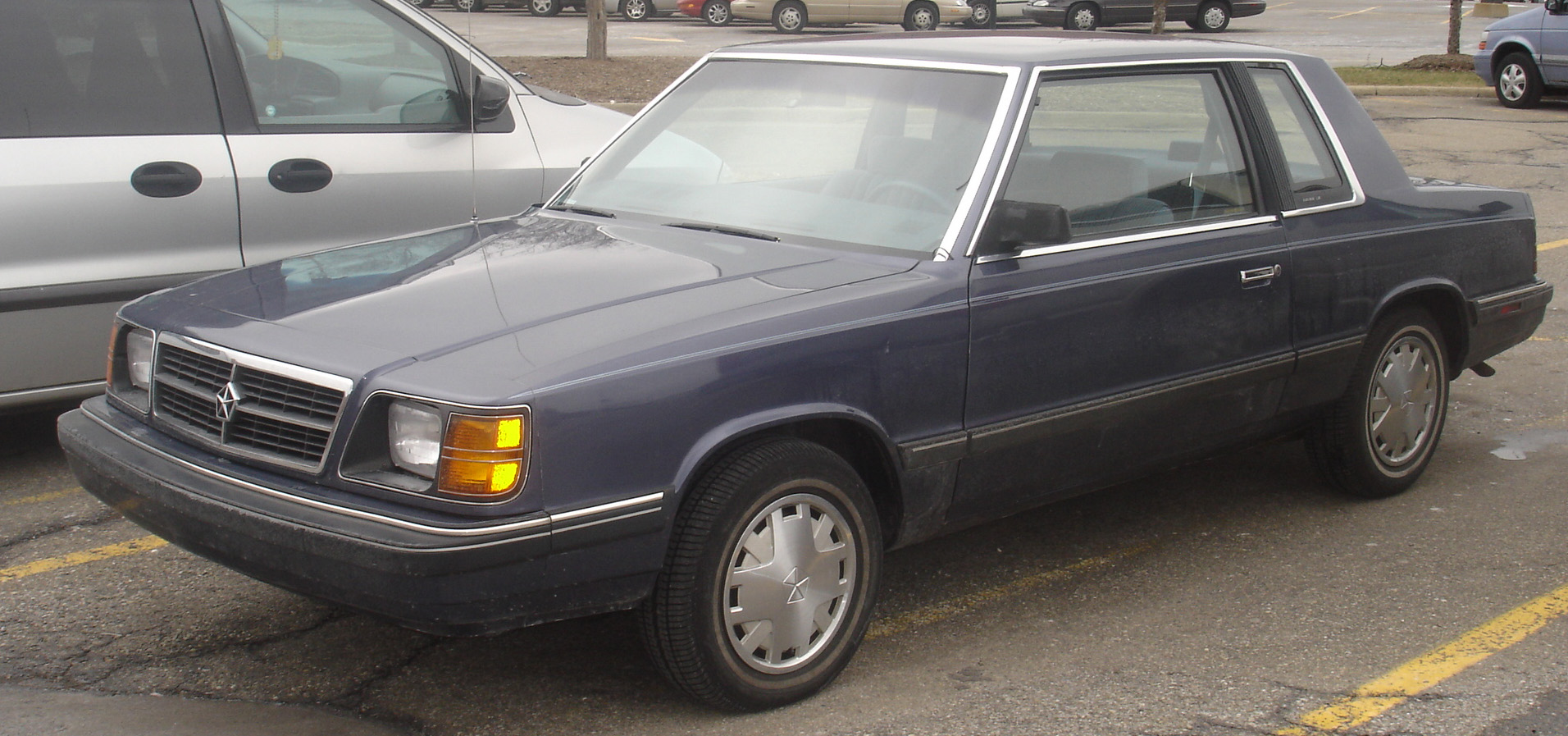
1985–1989 Dodge Aries coupe

The Dodge Daytona, a sports car introduced for the 1984 model year, originally used the 2.2 L Chrysler K engine in normally aspirated (93 hp) or turbocharged (142 hp) form. The 100 hp 2.5 L K engine was added for 1986. In 1985, the 2.2 L Turbo I engine's horsepower was increased to 146 hp (109 kW). The 1984 Daytona was available in three trim lines: standard, Turbo, and Turbo Z. Total production was 49,347. The Daytona Turbo was on Car and Driver magazine's 10Best list for 1984. Both the Daytona and Chrysler Laser were available with the Chrysler electronic voice alert system through 1987. A performance-oriented "Shelby" version of the Daytona was introduced in 1987. For 1987, the Daytona was restyled externally and featured pop-up headlights. New in 1987 was a Shelby Z trim level with an available Chrysler-developed Turbo II (174 hp (130 kW) – 200 lb⋅ft (271 N⋅m)) intercooled version of the 2.2 L Chrysler K engine, as well as a heavy-duty A555 transaxle with Getrag gears. The Shelby Z also featured numerous suspension upgrades, including a larger diameter front sway bar and disc brakes on all four wheels. This version was sold in Europe under the name Chrysler GS Turbo II. A more luxury-oriented Pacifica trim line was also added to replace the Chrysler Laser, which was dropped in the middle of the 1986 model year. Among the optional equipment included a leather interior, an eight-way power enthusiast driver's seat (with mechanical thigh and lumbar controls), a digital instrument cluster, and a 12-button trip computer (with instant fuel ratings as well as trip averages and estimated travel times).

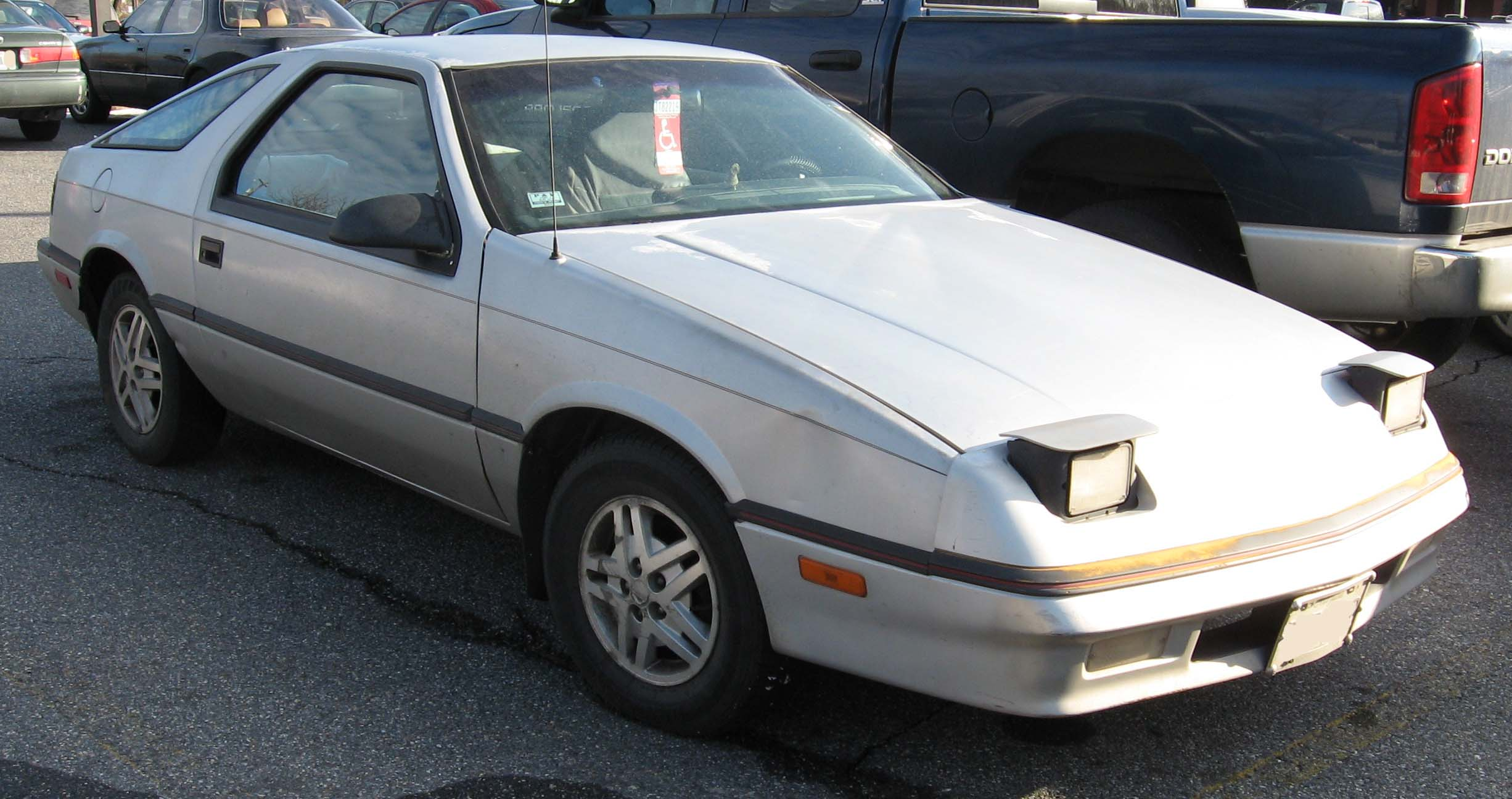
1987–1991 Dodge Daytona

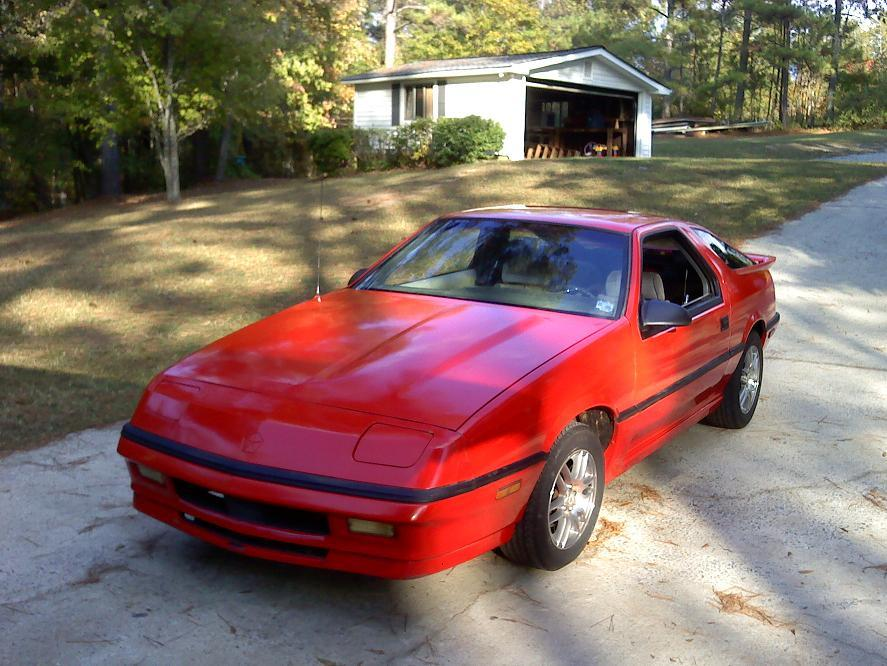
1987 Dodge Daytona Shelby Z

The Dodge Dynasty is related to the Chrysler New Yorker, as both car lines were built on the Chrysler C platform in Belvidere, Illinois. Dynasty trim levels included base and LE. Additionally, a "Brougham" package was offered on 1992–93 LE models that added a padded "landau" vinyl roof. When the new front-wheel-drive C-body cars (Dynasty and New Yorker) debuted for the 1988 model year, they were the first mass-produced cars in the world to have a fully multiplexed, fiber-optic wiring buss connecting all electronic accessories and controllers. The new electronically controlled four-speed automatic transmission, known as the Ultradrive or A604, debuted in 1989, and became the sole transmission for V6 models through 1993, the final production year of the Dynasty. The vast majority of Dynasties sold to private customers had V6 engines; four-cylinder models mostly went to the fleet market.

Through the late 1980s and 1990s, Dodge's designation as the sporty-car division was backed by a succession of high-performance and/or aggressively styled models, including the Daytona, 600, and Viper, as well as performance variants of the Lancer.

=== 1990s ===
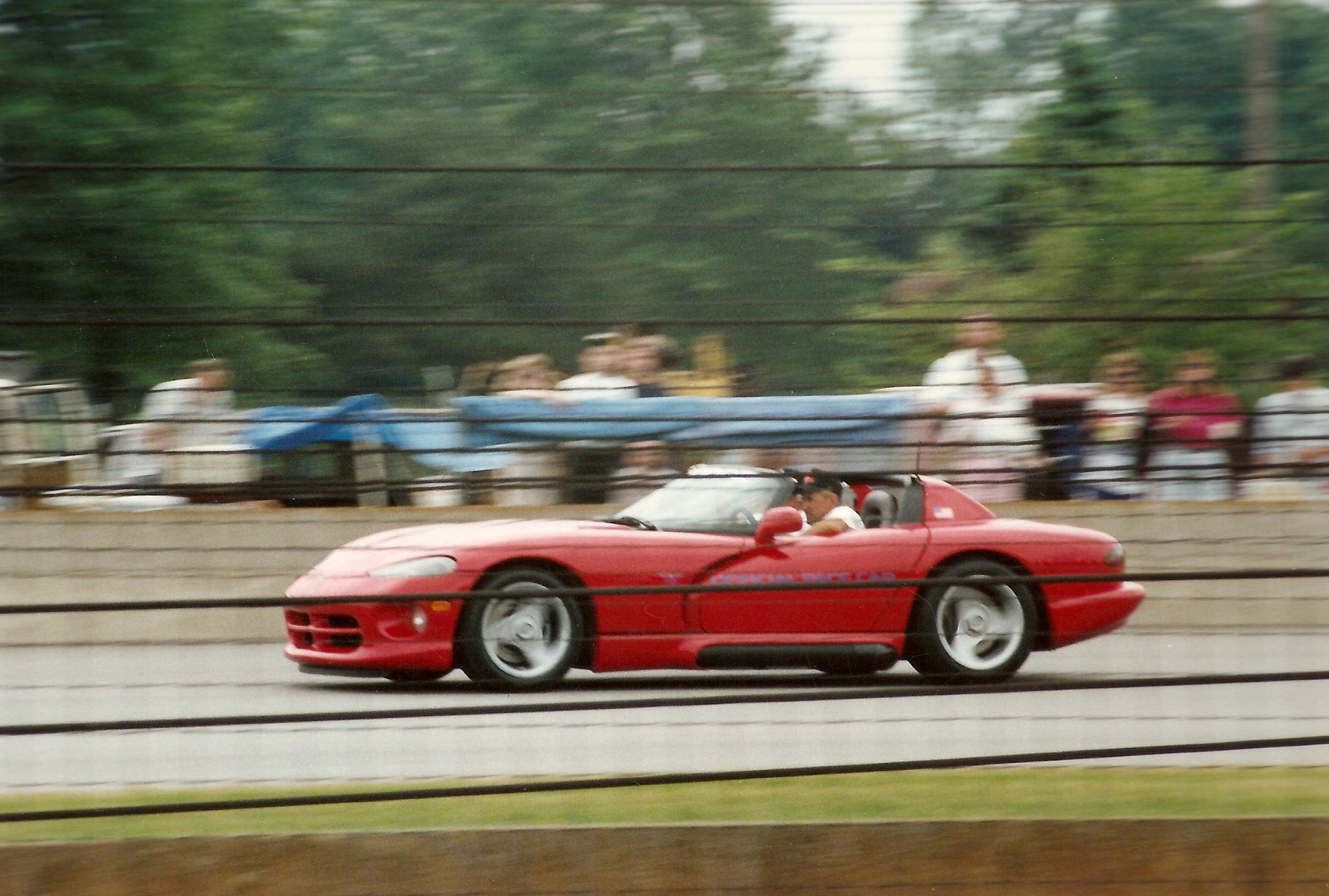
The pre-production Dodge Viper (SR I) as the pace car for the 1991 Indianapolis 500

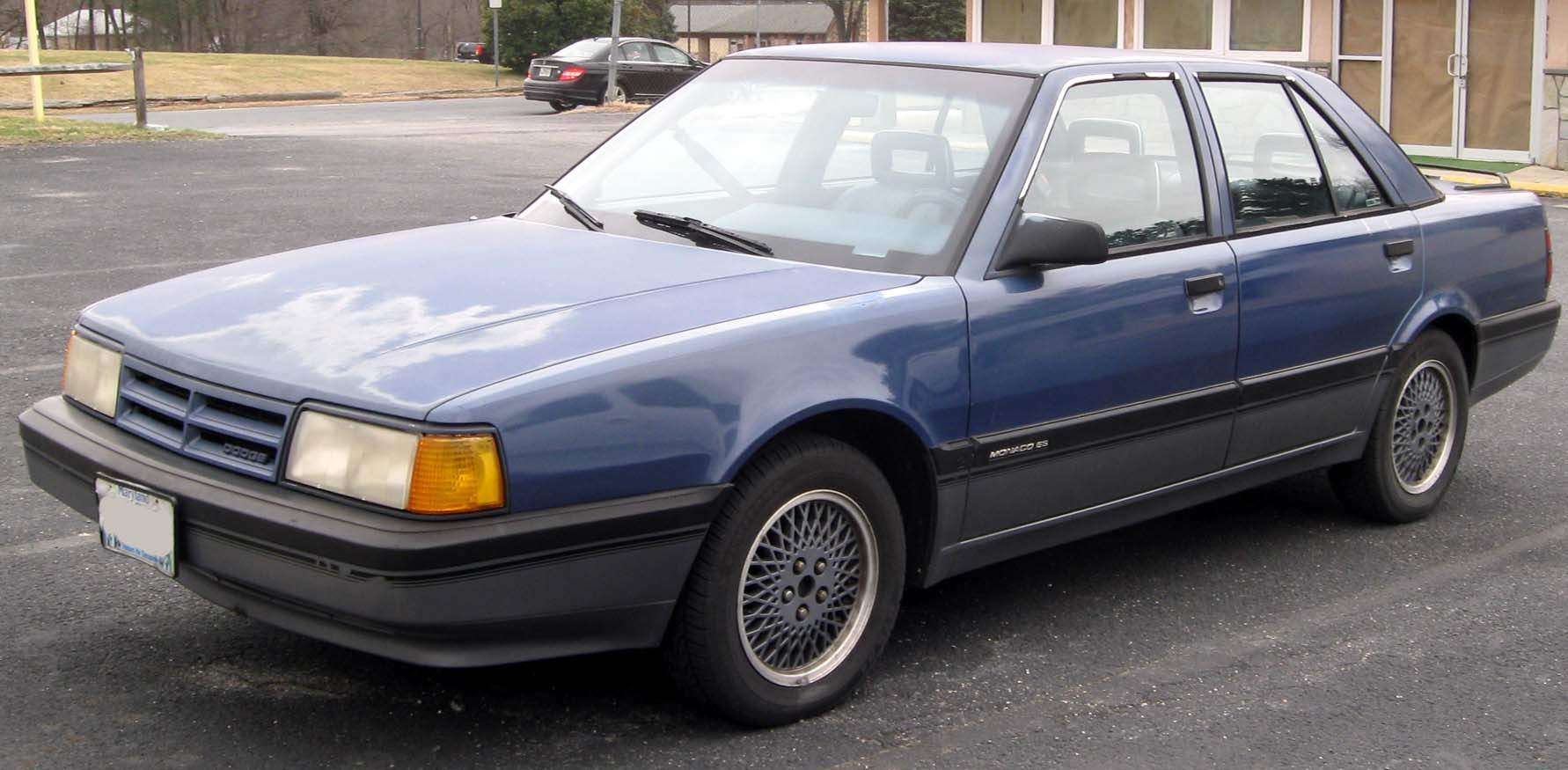
1990–1992 Dodge Monaco ES

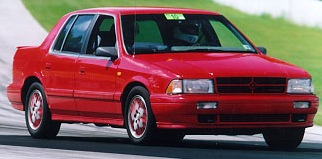
1991 Dodge Spirit R/T

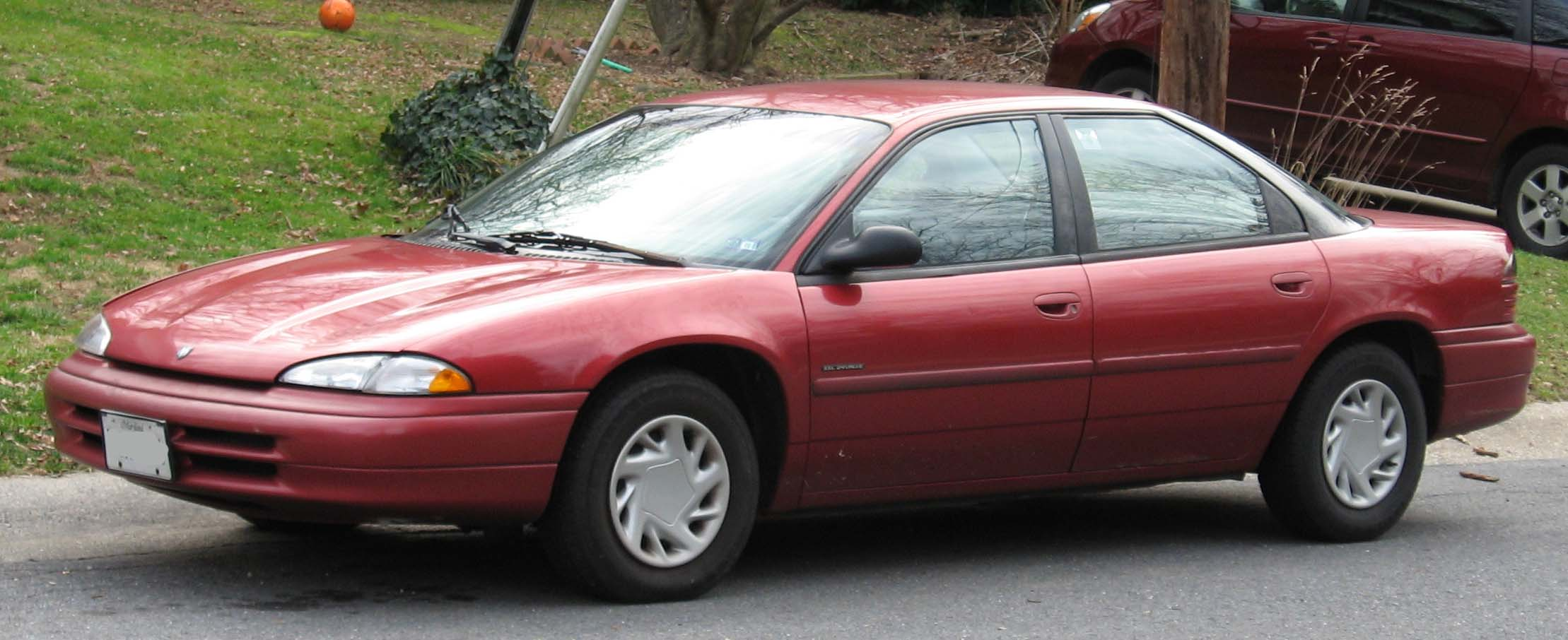
1993–1997 Dodge Intrepid

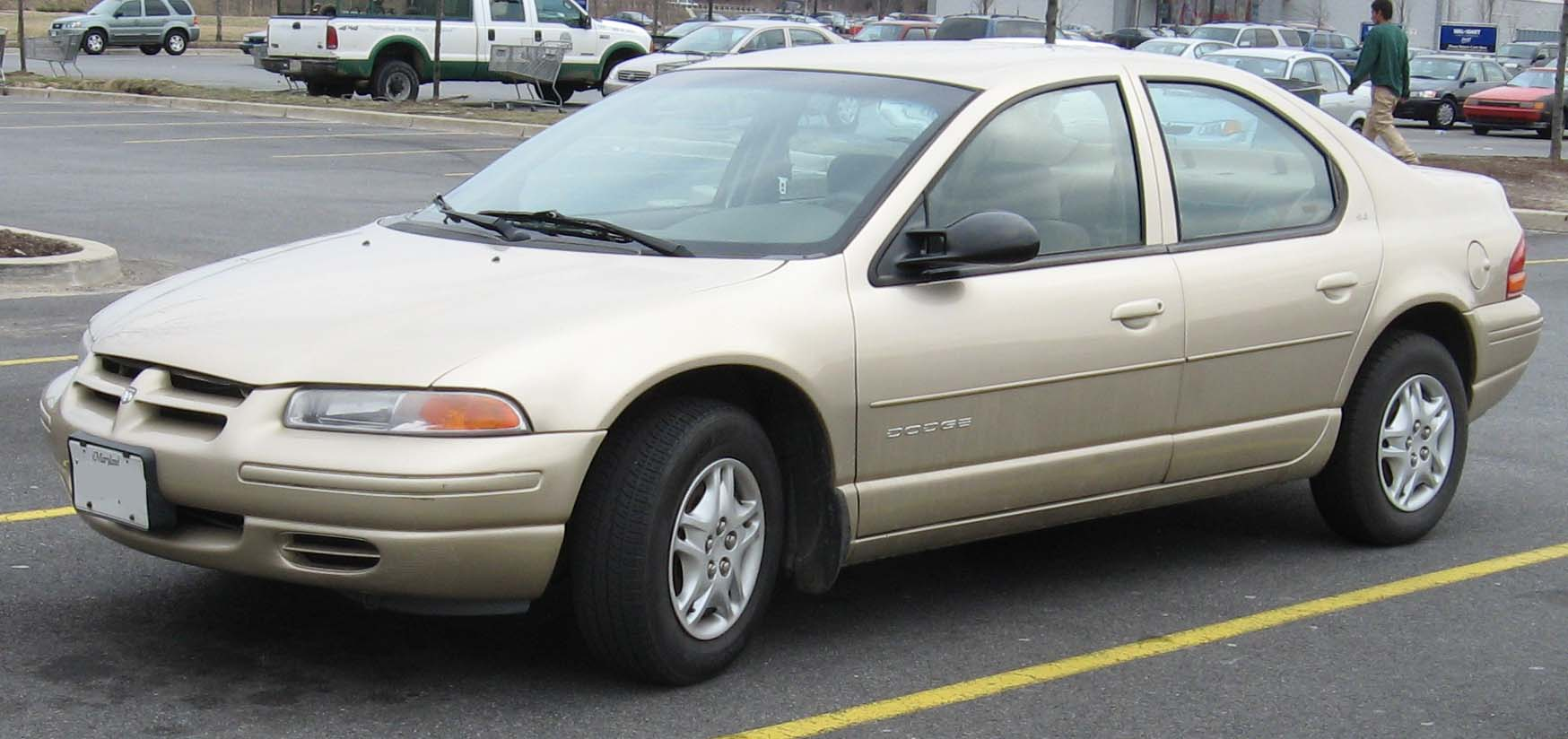
Cab Forward Design on a 1996 Dodge Stratus

The Dodge Omni and Plymouth Horizon ended production in 1990, and were replaced by the Dodge Shadow/Plymouth Sundance, which were both introduced for 1987. Both the Monaco and Premier were discontinued during the 1992 model year. However, its state-of-the-art manufacturing plant and the key executive from American Motors behind the Premier/Monaco design, François Castaing, would lead to the successful and highly rated "cab-forward" LH Dodge Intrepid, Chrysler Concorde, and Eagle Vision versions in late 1992, when production resumed at Brampton Assembly.

Dodge-branded Mitsubishi vehicles were phased out by 1993, except for the Dodge Stealth, which ran through 1996. However, Mitsubishi-made engines and electrical components were still widely used in domestic American Chrysler products.

In 1992, Dodge moved their performance orientation forward substantially with the Viper, which featured an aluminum V10 engine and composite sports roadster body. This was the first step in what was marketed as "The New Dodge", an aggressive advertising campaign with a litany of new models, with television ads narrated by Edward Herrmann that pointed out the innovations in the vehicles and challenged their competitors. Herrmann would go on to serve as the brand's spokesperson for the rest of the 1990s.

Later that year marked the introduction of the Intrepid sedan, substantially different from its boxy predecessor, the Dynasty. The Intrepid used what Chrysler called "cab forward" styling, with the wheels pushed out to the corners of the chassis for maximum passenger space. The Intrepid was available in two trim levels: base and the sportier, better-equipped ES, which added four-wheel disc brakes, 16-inch wheels with better tires, and stiffer "touring" suspension damping. All Intrepids received driver and front passenger airbags, a rarity at the time, as well as air conditioning and the four-speed automatic transmission. Anti-lock brakes were optional, as was traction control, and the more powerful 3.5 L SOHC engine rated at (214 hp).

In 1994, the second-generation Dodge Ram pickup was introduced, with bold styling that departed radically from the boxy designs of trucks made by the Big Three for two decades prior. The second-generation Ram began development in 1986. The original concept, dubbed the "Louisville Slugger" by Chrysler's Advanced Packaging Studio, was to be a modular platform that would accommodate a full-size truck and full-size van, which would have provided a roomy cab and cargo bed. The design featured a big-rig-looking front end and a large grille that was deemed risky at its introduction, but ultimately proved popular with consumers. The redesigned 1994 Ram was a sales success, and was named "Truck of the Year" by Motor Trend magazine in 1994. Sales increased from 95,542 units in 1993 to 232,092 in 1994, 410,000 in 1995, and 411,000 by 1996. The Ram was prominently featured in the 1996 film Twister. Sales of this generation peaked at just over 400,000 in 1999 before declining against the redesigned Ford and General Motors trucks.

Dodge followed up on this idea on a smaller scale with the Neon and Stratus. The Stratus was the middle entry of the Chrysler JA platform (with the Cirrus being the higher-end model and the Breeze being the lower-end model). The three cars differed only in the front fascia, rear bumper, taillights, and wheels. The interiors also had little variation between the three models; being almost identical, save for the name on the steering wheel, and a few available options. The Stratus directly replaced the high-volume Spirit (US only). The Stratus, Plymouth Breeze, and Chrysler Cirrus were all on Car and Driver magazine's Ten Best list for 1996 and 1997. It received critical acclaim at launch, but ratings fell over time.

The Neon was badged and sold as both a Dodge and a Plymouth in the U.S. and Canada; in Mexico was sold as a Dodge and a Chrysler in Mexico, and as the Chrysler Neon in Europe, Australia, and other export markets. At the Neon's release, then-Chrysler president Bob Lutz said, "There's an old saying in Detroit: 'Good, fast, or cheap. Pick any two.' We refuse to accept that." The Japanese press touted the Neon as the "Japanese car killer", due to a spiraling Yen and the lower production cost of the Neon. The Neon, with SOHC 132 hp (98 kW) and DOHC 150 hp (110 kW) versions of Chrysler's 2.0 L 4-cylinder engine, received praise for its appearance, price, and power when compared to competing cars such as the Honda Civic DX at 102 hp (76 kW), the Civic EX at 127 hp (95 kW), the Nissan Sentra at 115 hp (86 kW), the Ford Escort ZX2 at 130 hp (97 kW), the Toyota Corolla at 115 hp (86 kW), the Saturn S-Series at 100 hp (75 kW) for SOHC variants and 124 hp (92 kW) for DOHC variants, and the Chevrolet Cavalier Base and LS models at 120 hp (89 kW), among others.

The Dodge Durango, a mid-size SUV, was introduced for the 1998 model year. The Durango's first two generations were very similar, in that both generations were based on the Dodge Dakota pickup, featured a body-on-frame construction, and were produced at the Newark Assembly Plant. The Durango was marketed as a sturdy, truck-based SUV designed to hold up to seven passengers and tow up to 7,500 lb (3,400 kg) when properly equipped. The Durango shared a front end, instrument panel, and front seats with the Dakota pickup on which it was based. Original designs of the eight-passenger Durango featured a rear-facing third row similar to many older station wagons. To make room for a more practical, forward-facing third row, Dodge shortened the length of the front doors and raised the roof two inches (5 cm) beyond the front seats, allowing for stadium seating. The Durango's roof rack was designed to mask the appearance of the raised roof.

=== The modern era: 1998–present ===
==== DaimlerChrysler and private ownership ====
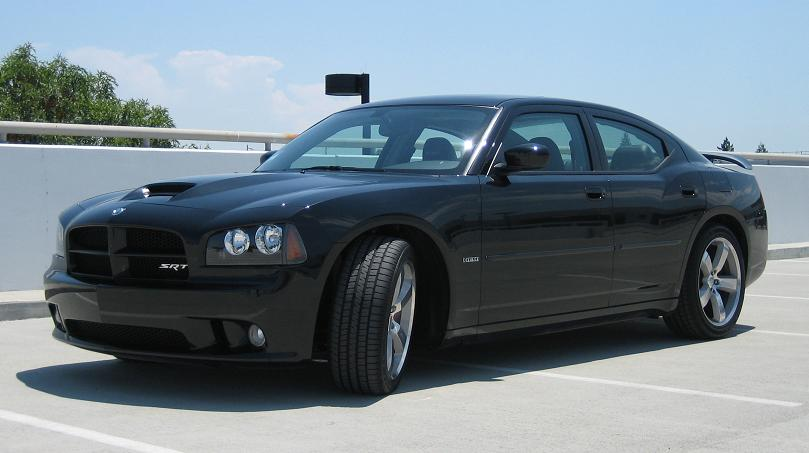
2006 Dodge Charger SRT8 sedan

In a move that never lived up to the expectations of its driving forces, Chrysler Corporation merged with Daimler-Benz AG in 1998 to form DaimlerChrysler. Dodge's longtime sister brand Plymouth was withdrawn from the market, with Chrysler reasoning that the company's broader lineup was a greater priority. With this move, Dodge became DaimlerChrysler's low-price division, as well as its performance division.

The Intrepid, Stratus, and Neon updates from 1998 to 2000 were largely complete before Daimler's presence, and Dodge's first experience of any platform sharing with the German side of the company was the 2005 Magnum station wagon, introduced as a replacement for the Intrepid. The Magnum featured Chrysler's first mainstream rear-wheel drive platform since the 1980s, and a revival of the Hemi V8 engine. The Charger was launched in 2006 on the same platform.

In 2000, the Stratus became the last of the surviving "Cloud Cars", with the Cirrus being renamed the Sebring and the Breeze being discontinued (along with the Plymouth brand).

This generation of the Dodge Stratus was not sold in Canada, although 1999 was the last year for Stratus sales in Canada. 2002 models dropped the Dodge badges from the doors. During this time, sales declined as the Stratus's ratings from consumer and auto magazines fell below average among mid-size cars, while the sedan market had shifted and pushed the larger Intrepid and later Charger to record sales. 2004 brought styling revisions, which did not reverse this trend. The Stratus was discontinued in May 2006 (the Sebring name was continued).

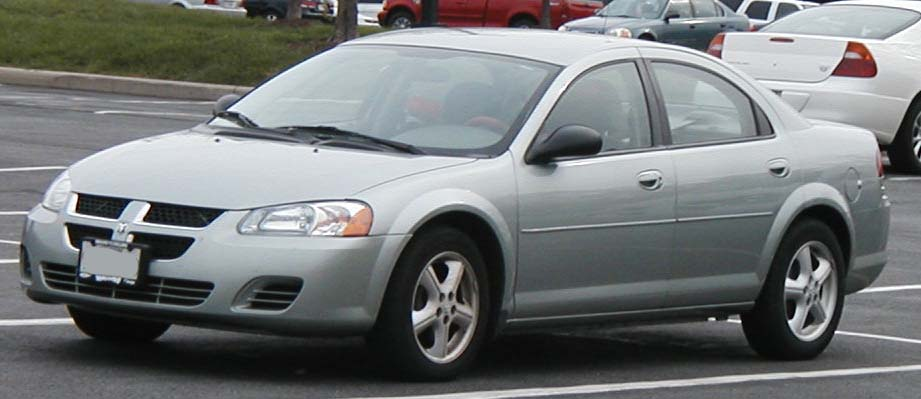
2004–2006 Dodge Stratus sedan

The Dodge Avenger name returned in February 2007 as a 2008 model year sedan to replace the Dodge Stratus, whose coupe version had replaced the original Avenger in 2001. According to some reports, the Avenger, along with the redesigned Chrysler Sebring, shares a DaimlerChrysler/Mitsubishi platform called JS, which used the Mitsubishi GS as a starting point. The base engine in the SE and SXT trim levels was the 2.4 L GEMA I4 naturally aspirated "World Engine", a joint venture between DaimlerChrysler, Mitsubishi, and Hyundai. Additional engines included an optional 2.7 L V6 in the SXT and a standard 3.5 L V6 in the R/T trim level. In addition to the 2.4 L "World Engine" and the V6s, export vehicles were offered with the 2.0 L naturally aspirated "World Engine", as well as a 2.0 L turbocharged diesel (Pumpe-Düse) made by Volkswagen. As a 2008 model, the Dodge Avenger came to showrooms in February 2007.

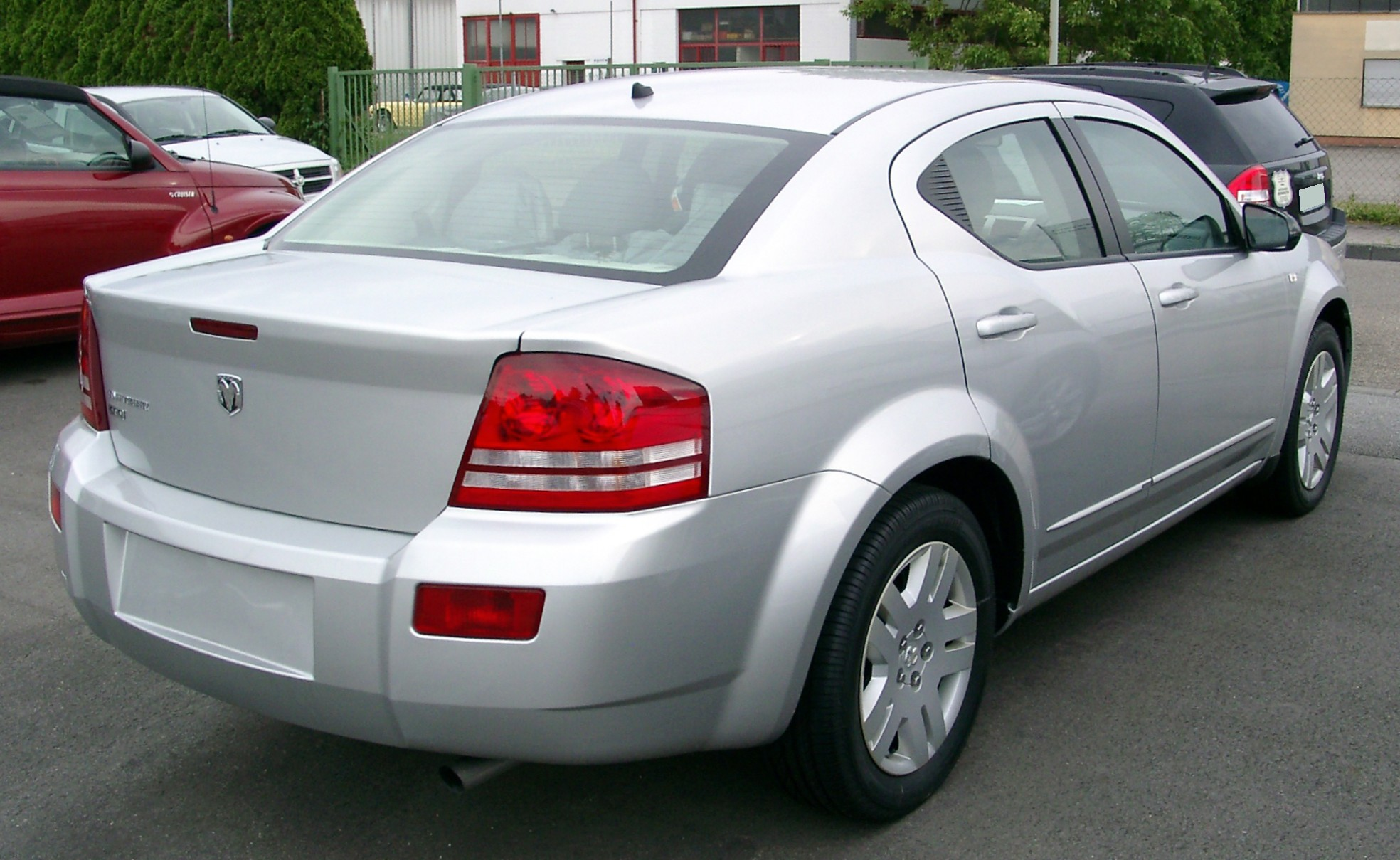
Rear view of a 2007–2014 Dodge Avenger

Further cost savings were explored in the form of an extensive platform-sharing arrangement with Mitsubishi, which spawned the Avenger sedan and the Caliber subcompact as a replacement for the Neon. The rear-drive chassis was then used in early 2008 to build a new Challenger, with styling reminiscent of the original 1970 Challenger. Like its predecessor, the new Challenger coupe was available with a V8 engine (base models featured a V6). In spring 2007, DaimlerChrysler reached an agreement with Cerberus Capital Management to sell its Chrysler Group subsidiary, of which the Dodge division was a part. Soon after, the housing bubble began to collapse the American market, and on May 1, 2009, Chrysler and General Motors filed for bankruptcy.

==== Fiat ownership ====
On June 10, 2009, Italian automaker Fiat formed a partnership with Chrysler under Sergio Marchionne, the United Auto Workers (UAW), and the U.S. government to form Chrysler Group LLC, of which Dodge remained fully integrated. For its part, the U.S. government provided more than $6 billion in loans at 21%, called a "bridge loan" or "bailout". The newly formed company went on to fully repay that loan, remortgaging to reduce the interest rate several times down to 6%. They fully paid back the loan with interest to the government on May 24, 2011, a full five years early. The UAW, being partners throughout the process, were paid well and above $3.9 billion in 2013 as Sergio's plan for full consolidation has continued on schedule. This has allowed Chrysler LLC to fully merge with Fiat to form Fiat Chrysler Automobiles (FCA) in 2014. The combined company is based in London.

In 2013, Dodge reintroduced a compact car based on an Alfa Romeo design called the Dart. It was the first new Dodge model produced under FCA.

On May 6, 2014, FCA announced a major restructuring, in which Dodge would focus solely on performance vehicles and be positioned between Chrysler (moving downmarket into mainstream vehicles) and a relaunched Alfa Romeo (making its return to North America after a 20-year absence) in the FCA lineup. This is a setup similar to PSA Peugeot Citroën, which positioned Peugeot as its mainstream brand while Citroën was more performance-based, as well as Hyundai Motor Group having its two mainstream brands, Kia Motors and Hyundai Motor Company, focusing on performance and mid-luxury, respectively (among the American press, it has drawn comparisons to the decades-long positioning of Chevrolet and Pontiac at General Motors before the phase-out of Pontiac in 2010). As part of the restructuring, Dodge would discontinue the Grand Caravan and Avenger without replacements, while launching a sporty subcompact below the Dart in 2018. Additionally, while the Ram Trucks division would remain separate (although the Durango would remain in production as a Dodge), the SRT division was merged back into Dodge.

On July 8, 2020, FCA announced that Dodge would shift its focus to a performance marque offering three core brands–Charger, Challenger, and Durango–starting with the 2021 model year. Both the Journey and Grand Caravan were discontinued with the 2020 model year models.

Dodge's product lineup in North America by 2030 will include the Charger, Durango, GLH, and a yet-unnamed model.

== List of CEOs ==
Current Matt McAlear (since June 1st 2024)

=== Previous CEOs ===
- Michael Accavitti (2009–2011)
- Reid Bigland (2011–2014)
- Tim Kuniskis (2014–2024)

== Dodge Automobiles ==
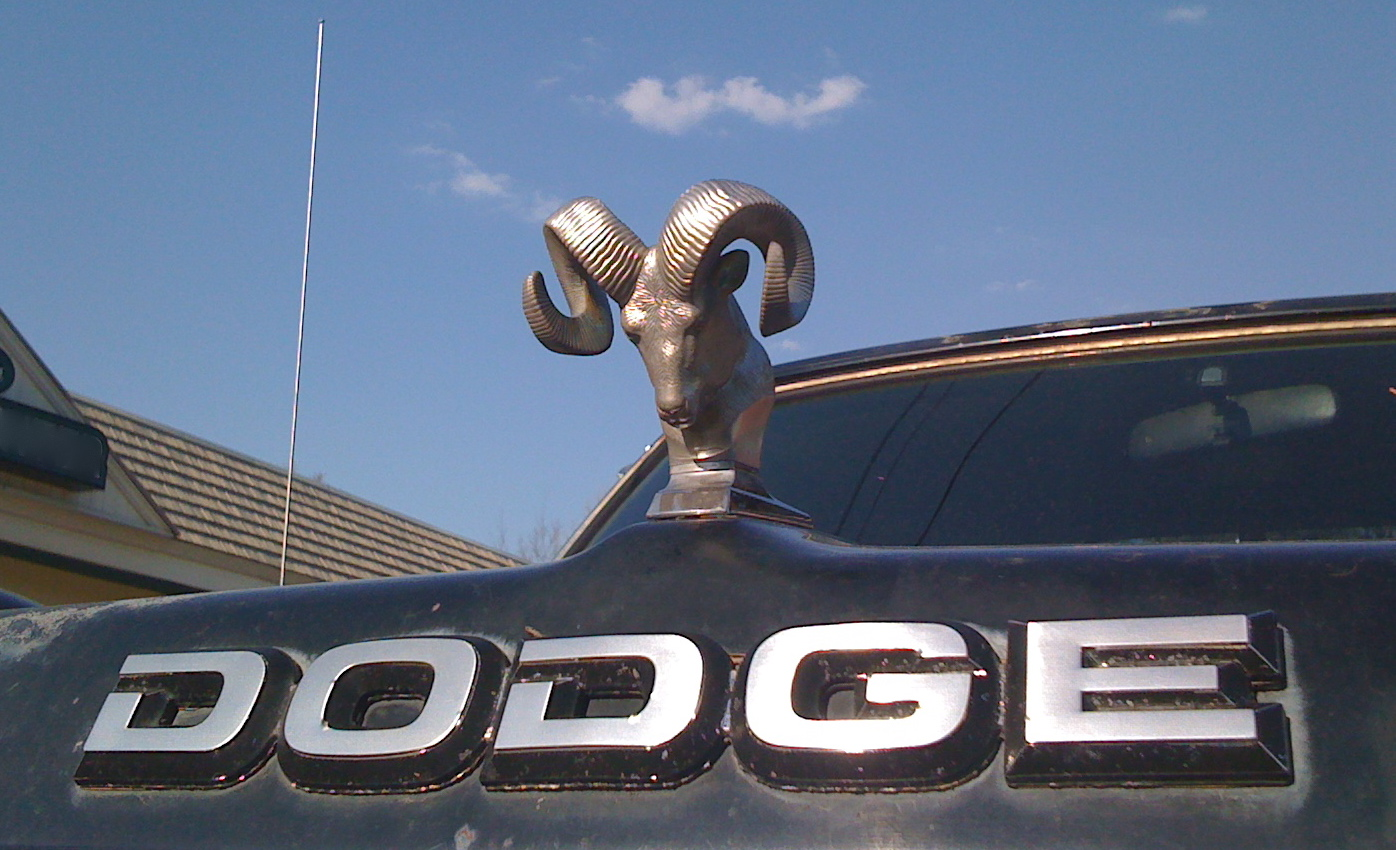
Ram hood ornaments adorned every Dodge car and truck from 1932 until 1954.

Over the decades, Dodge has become well known for its passenger car output, along with its many truck models. However, after almost a century of manufacturing these vehicles, a decision was made to spin off Dodge's trucks into a separate Ram brand, based on the popularity of their top-selling truck, the Dodge Ram. Although the Ram trucks are marketed separately from Dodge cars, Ram president Fred Diaz has said:

Ram trucks will always and forever be Dodges. Ram will always have the Dodge emblem inside and outside and they will be 'vinned' (from the acronym VIN, or Vehicle Identification Number) as a Dodge. We need to continue to market as Ram so Dodge can have a different brand identity: hip, cool, young, energetic. That will not fit the campaign for truck buyers. The two should have distinct themes.

=== Pickups and medium to heavy trucks ===
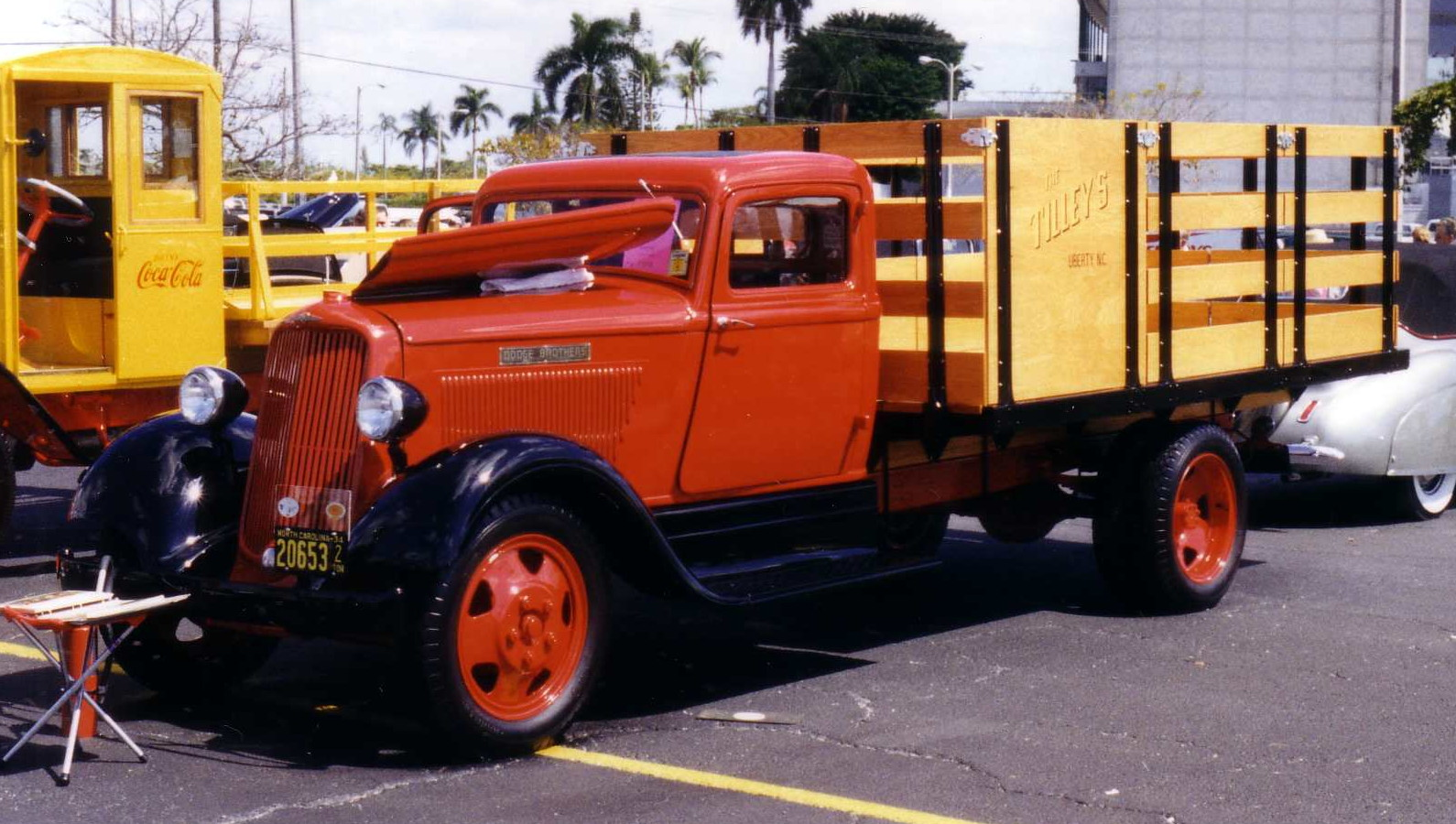
1934 Dodge K-34 stake bed truck

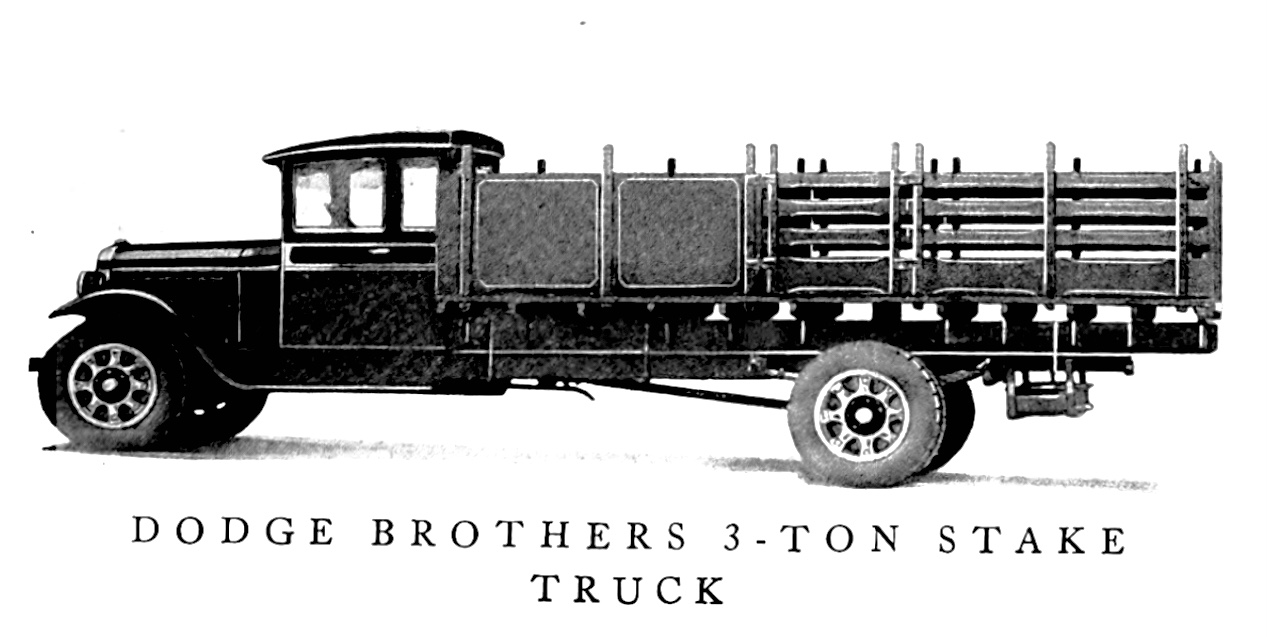
Dodge 3 t GE;OE (1928-1933)

Since Dodge began building their cars in 1914, the company also offered light truck models. Initially, these were largely based on the existing passenger cars, but eventually gained their own chassis and body designs as the market matured. During the 1930s and 1940s, light- and medium-duty models were offered, followed by a heavy-duty range. The very large, new Warren Truck Assembly plant was built in Michigan, just north of Detroit, and opened in 1938, producing Dodge trucks ever since.

In 1936, Dodge's light, car-based trucks were crucially redesigned—not only receiving a new "Fore-Point" (similar to cab forward) design of the front side and cab—but especially, the old car frames were dropped and for the first time replaced by modern, truck-style chassis, with side rails welded to the cross members. These welded frames were henceforth introduced on half- to one-ton rated trucks, expanding Dodge into a heavier truck market segment than before.

In 1939, Dodge presented a completely redesigned line of pickups and trucks, with streamlined, "art-deco" front sheet metal styling. Introducing the concept of "Job-Rated", Dodge tried to offer customers the truck that fit every job they were buying it for. From the 1939 "Job-Rated" trucks onwards, Dodge's light and medium trucks were built in its "Mound Road" plant in Warren, Michigan.

Following World War II and the successful application of four-wheel drive to the truck line, Dodge introduced a civilian version that it called the Power Wagon. Initially based almost exactly on the military-type design, variants of the standard truck line were eventually given 4WD and the same "Power Wagon" name.

Dodge was among the first to introduce car-like features to its trucks, adding the plush Adventurer package during the 1960s and offering sedan-like space in its Club Cab bodies of the 1970s. Declining sales and increased competition during the 1970s eventually forced the company to drop its medium- and heavy-duty models, an arena the company has only recently begun to reenter.

Dodge introduced what they called the "Adult Toys" line to boost its truck sales in the late 1970s, starting with the limited edition Lil' Red Express pickup (featuring a 360 c.i. police interceptor engine and visible big rig-style exhaust stacks). Later came the more widely available Warlock. Other "Adult Toys" from Dodge included the "Macho Power Wagon" and "Street Van".

As part of a general decline in the commercial vehicle field during the 1970s, Dodge eliminated their LCF Series heavy-duty trucks in 1975, along with the Bighorn and medium-duty D-Series trucks, and affiliated S Series school buses were dropped in 1978. Meanwhile, it produced several thousand pickups for the United States military under the CUCV program from the late 1970s into the early 1980s.

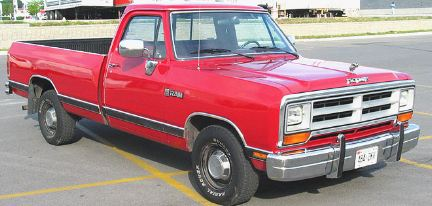
1989 Dodge Ram pickup

Continuing financial problems meant that even Dodge's light-duty models – renamed as the Ram pickup line for 1981 – were carried over with mostly minimal updates until 1993. Two factors helped to revitalize Dodge's fortunes during this time. One was the introduction of Cummins's powerful and reliable B Series turbo-diesel engine as an option for 1989. This innovation raised Dodge's profile among consumers who needed power for towing or large loads. The second was a class-exclusive V8 engine option for the mid-sized Dakota pickup.

Dodge introduced the Ram's all-new "big-rig" styling treatment for 1994. In addition to its instantly polarizing looks, the new truck also gained exposure when it was featured on the television series Walker, Texas Ranger starring Chuck Norris. The new Ram also featured a new interior with a console box big enough to hold a laptop computer, and ventilation and radio controls that were designed to be easily used even with gloves on. A V10 engine derived from that used in the Viper sports car was also new, and the previously offered Cummins turbodiesel remained available. The smaller Dakota was redesigned for 1997, using the "big-rig" styling, thus giving Dodge trucks a definitive "face" that set them apart from the competition.

The Ram was redesigned again for 2002, and the Dakota in 2005, and was an evolution of the original, but adding the Hemi V8 engine to the list of available options, due to the revival of the Chrysler Hemi V8 engine. New medium-duty chassis-cab models were introduced for 2007, with standard Cummins turbodiesel power as a way of gradually getting Dodge back into the business truck market again.

For a time during the 1980s, Dodge imported a line of small pickups from Mitsubishi, known as the D50, or later the Ram 50, and were carried on as a stopgap until the Dakota's sales eventually made the imported trucks irrelevant. In a reversal, Mitsubishi has more recently purchased Dakota pickups from Dodge and restyled them into their own Raider line for sale in North America.

=== Vans ===
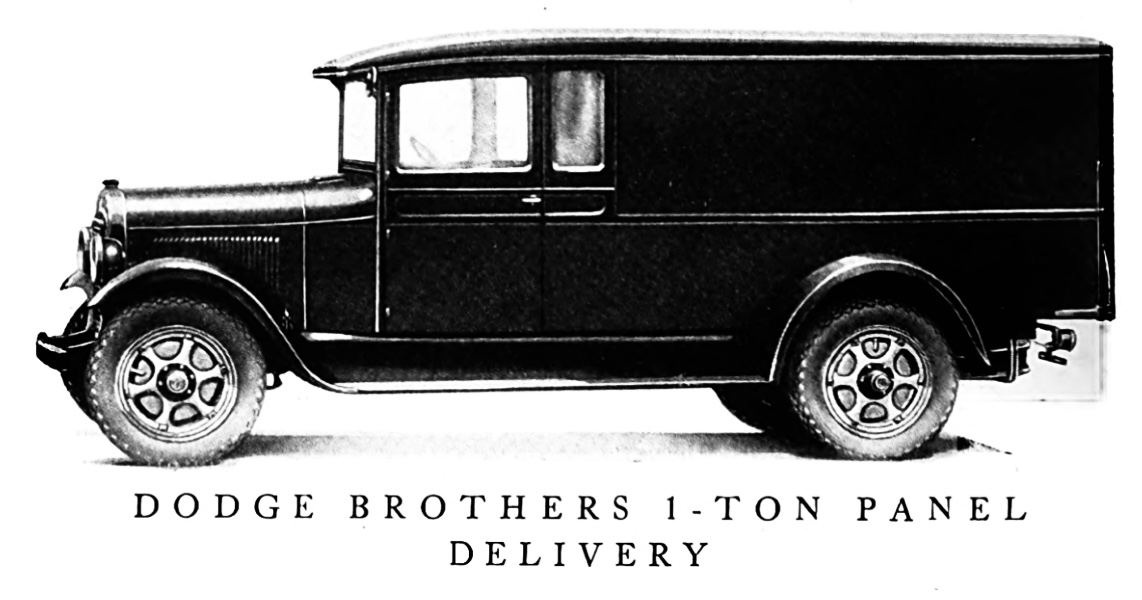
Dodge 1t DA (1928-1932)

Dodge built panel delivery models for many years since its founding, but their first purpose-built van model arrived for the 1964 model year with the compact A Series. Based on the Dodge Dart platform and using its proven six-cylinder or V8 engines, the A-series was a strong competitor for both its domestic rivals (from Ford, Chevrolet, and GMC) and the diminutive Volkswagen Transporter line.

As the market evolved, Dodge realized that a bigger, stronger van line would be needed in the future. The B Series was introduced for 1971, offering both car-like comfort in its Sportsman passenger line or expansive room for gear and materials in its Tradesman cargo line. A chassis cab version was also offered for use with bigger cargo boxes or flatbeds. Like the trucks, Chrysler's dire financial straits of the late 1970s precluded any major updates for the vans for many years. Rebadged as the Ram Van and Ram Wagon for 1981, this design carried on for 33 years, with little more than cosmetic and safety updates until 2003.

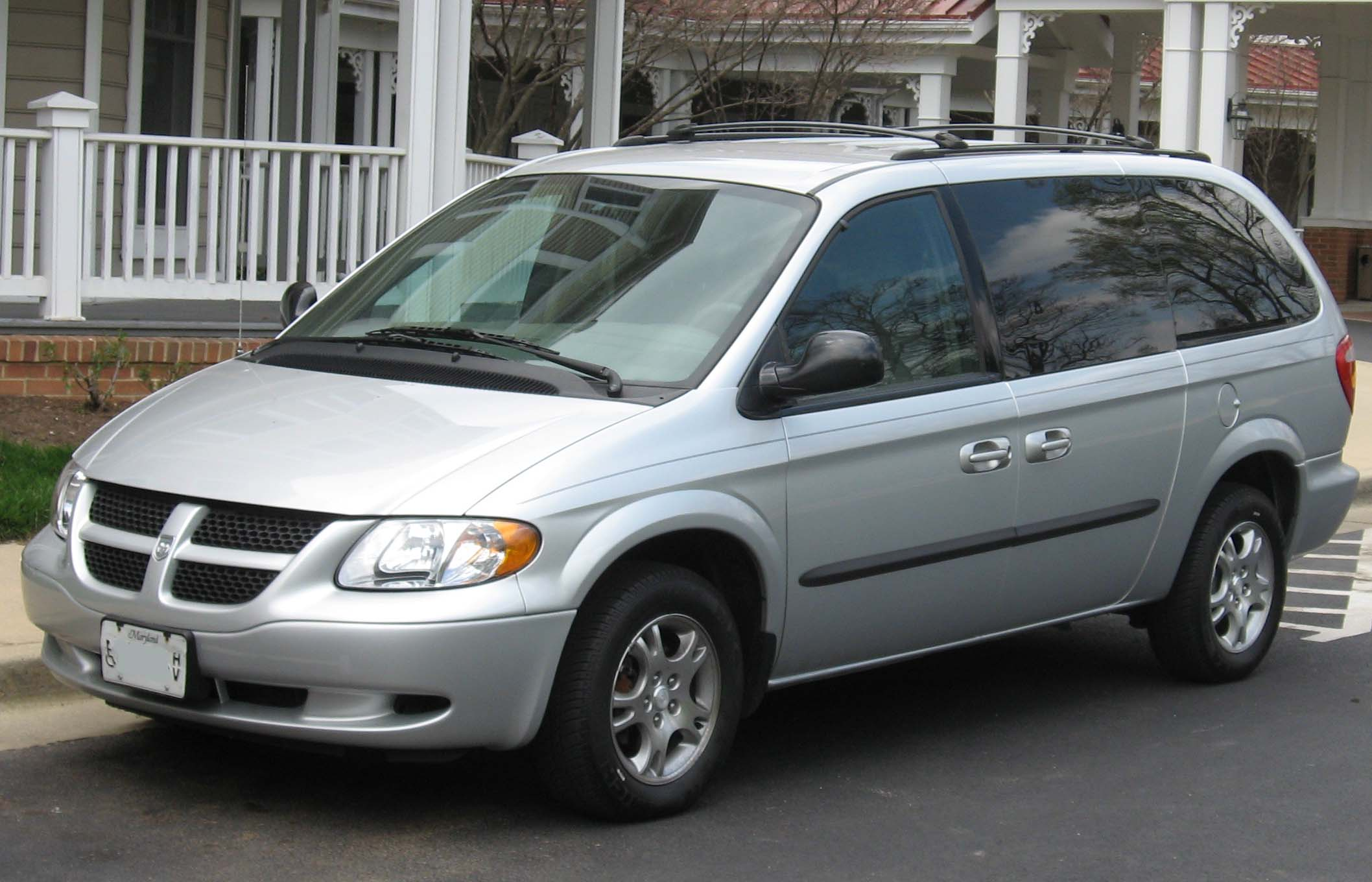
2001–2004 Dodge Grand Caravan

The 1998 DaimlerChrysler merger made it possible for Dodge to explore new ideas, and the European-styled Mercedes-Benz Sprinter line of vans was brought over and given a Dodge styling treatment. Redesigned for 2006 as a 2007 model, the economical diesel-powered Sprinters became very popular for city usage among delivery companies like FedEx and UPS. Because of their fuel efficiency, major motorhome manufacturer Thor Motor Coach produced several Class C and Class A Motorhomes available on the Sprinter Chassis, including their Four Winds Siesta and Chateau Citation product lines.

Dodge also offered a cargo version of its best-selling Caravan for many years, initially calling it the Mini Ram Van, a name originally applied to the short-wheelbase B Series Ram Vans. It was later known as the Caravan C/V, with "C/V" standing for "Cargo Van". For the 2012 model year, the Caravan C/V was rebranded as a Ram and was renamed the Ram C/V.

The Grand Caravan became Dodge's last minivan, as it was discontinued after the 2020 model year to introduce the Chrysler Voyager for the 2021 model year.

=== Sport utility vehicles ===
Dodge's first experiments with anything like a sport utility vehicle appeared in the late 1950s, with a windowed version of their standard panel truck, known as the Town Wagon. These were built in the same style through the mid-1960s. The division never entered the SUV arena in earnest until 1974, with the purpose-built Ramcharger. Offering the then-popular open body style and Dodge's powerful V8 engines, the Ramcharger was a strong competitor to trucks like the Ford Bronco, Chevrolet Blazer, and International Scout II.

During the 1980s, Dodge was left with outdated products as the market evolved. The Ramcharger hung on through 1993 with only minor updates. When the Ram truck was redesigned for the 1994 model year, the Ramcharger was discontinued in the U.S. and Canadian markets. A version using the updated styling was made for the Mexican market, but was never imported to the U.S. or Canada.

Using the mid-sized Dakota pickup's chassis as a base, Dodge introduced the 1997 four-door Durango SUV, which seated eight people and was sized between smaller SUVs like the Chevrolet Blazer and Ford Explorer and larger models like the Chevrolet Tahoe and Ford Expedition. The redesigned version for 2004 grew a little in every dimension, becoming a full-size SUV, but was still sized between most of its competitors. For 2011, a new unibody Durango, based on the Jeep Grand Cherokee, was released. The 2011 Durango shrank slightly to a size comparable to the original model. With the Journey being discontinued in 2020, the Durango became the only SUV offering in the Dodge lineup.

Dodge also imported a version of Mitsubishi's popular Montero (Pajero in Japan) as the Raider from 1987 until 1989.

=== High-performance vehicles ===
From the early 2000s onwards, Dodge's highest-performing vehicles were marketed under Street & Racing Technology (SRT) branding. These models often came equipped with high-performance V8s, and included the Dodge Challenger SRT (2008–present), Dodge Charger SRT (2006–present), Dodge Magnum SRT (2006–2008), and Dodge Durango SRT (2018-present). They also produced the Dodge Neon SRT-4 (2003–2005), Dodge Caliber SRT4 (2008–2009), Dodge Viper (1991–2010, 2012–2017), and Dodge Ram SRT-10 (2004–2006). In 2015, FCA introduced the Hellcat, a 707 HP, supercharged 6.2 L Hemi V8. In 2017, Dodge released the Dodge Challenger SRT Demon, powered by an 840 HP supercharged 6.2 L Hemi V8. It comes with a toolbox known as the "Demon Toolbox" that comes with materials for drag racing, including skinny front drag tires. However, buyers would only get 840 HP on race fuel. On regular pump gas, it produces 808 HP, a 101 HP increase over the Hellcat.

== International markets ==
=== Argentina ===
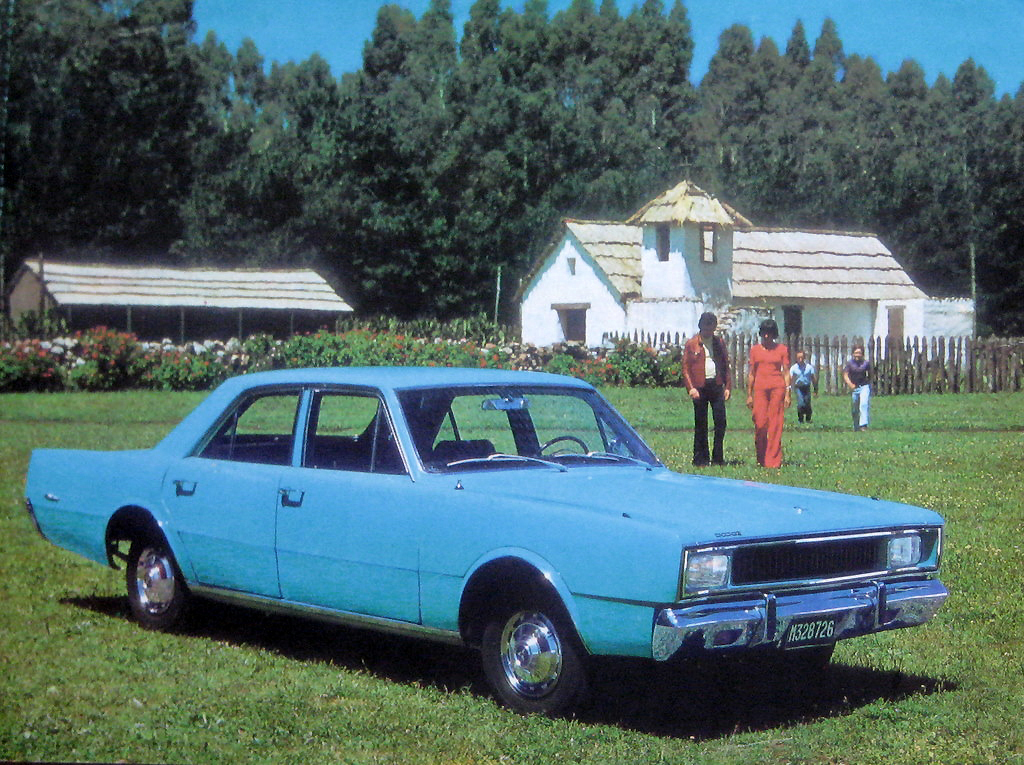
An Argentine Dodge Polara, produced from 1968 until 1980

Dodge came to Argentina in the early 20th century with imported cars and trucks. In 1960, it partnered with Fevre-Basset as a local manufacturer. The first vehicle made in Argentina was the D-100 "Sweptline" pickup. Between 1961 and 1980, a variety of trucks were produced, including the D-400/DP-400, D-500/DP-500, DP600, DD900 and DD1000 (the last two with one curiosity: the air-cooled Deutz engine rather Perkins or Chrysler). Passenger cars were also produced, namely the Valiant I and II, and the local versions of the 1966 Dodge Dart (called Valiant III and IV). In 1971, the Dodge 1500, a rebadged Hillman Avenger from the United Kingdom, was introduced. In 1982, production of Dodge vehicles ceased when German company Volkswagen bought the Fevre factory.

In Argentina, the name "Polara" was used to refer to a series of vehicles developed based on the fourth-generation North American Dodge Dart. These cars were manufactured between 1968 and 1980 by the subsidiary Chrysler-Fevre Argentina S.A.

In 1993, Dodge began marketing cars and pick-ups directly in Argentina. Currently, both the Journey and the Ram are available to Argentine customers.

=== Asia ===
Dodge entered the Japanese market in mid-2007, and re-entered the Chinese market in late 2007. Soueast Motors of China assembled the Caravan for the Chinese market. Dodge marketed its vehicles in South Korea in 2004, starting with the Dakota. Dodge vehicles are no longer marketed in China, Japan, and South Korea. In the Philippines, Dodge vehicles have been distributed by Auto Nation Group (formerly known as CATS Motors) since the 2000s. Dodge vehicles are also distributed in some Middle Eastern countries.

=== Australia ===
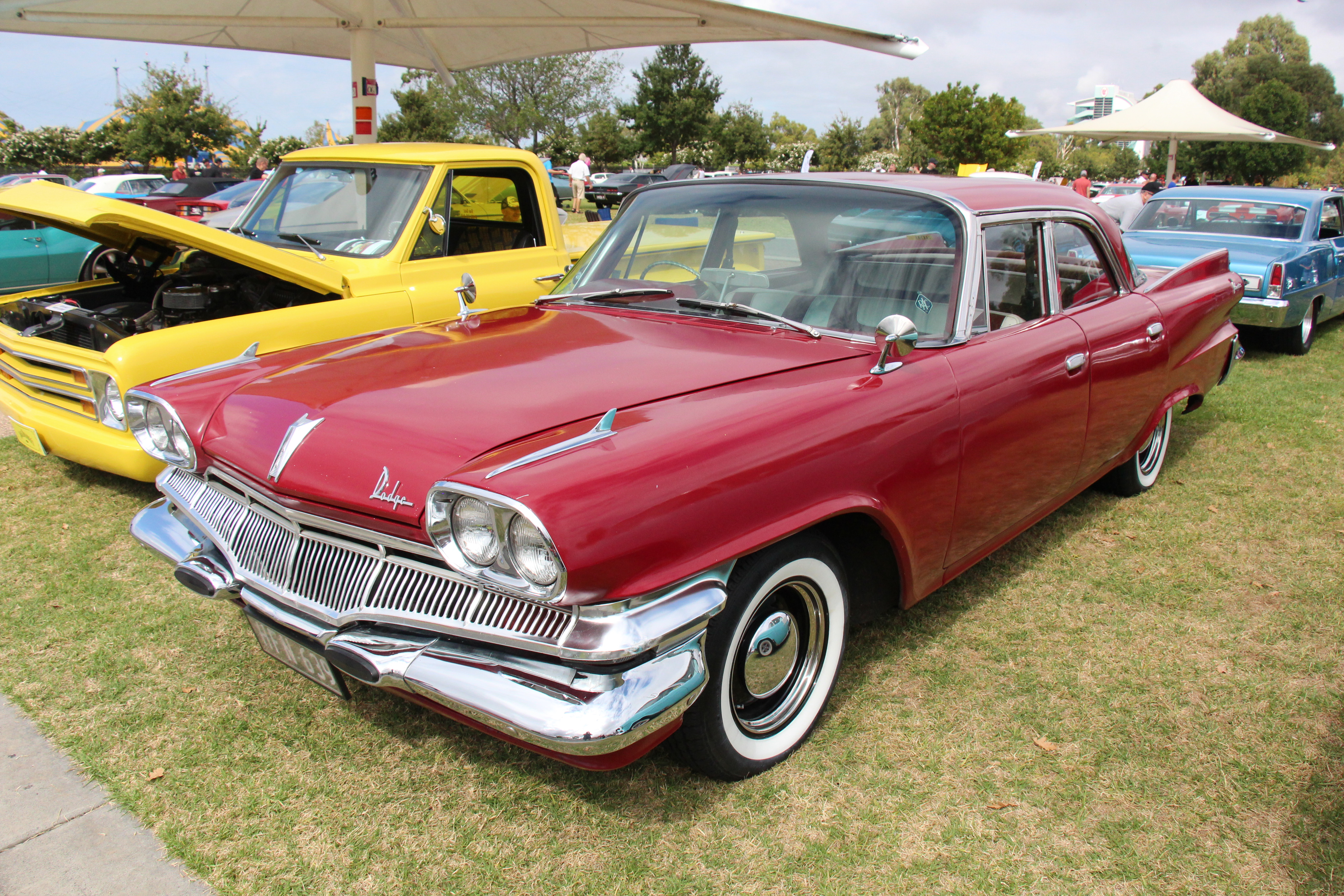
Australian produced 1960 Dodge Phoenix

Vehicles were produced in Australia under the Dodge name by Chrysler Australia from the 1950s until the 1970s.

Dodge re-entered the Australian market in 2006 with the Caliber, their first offering since the AT4/D5N trucks in 1979 and the first Dodge passenger car to be marketed in Australia since the Phoenix sedan was discontinued in 1973. The second model to be introduced was the Nitro, followed by the Avenger and Journey. Dodge chose not to use the full model lines and engines available to them, the 2.7 L V6 being available in the Journey and Avenger instead of the 3.2 L in the North American versions. However, diesel engines were introduced in all their cars.

After the 2008 financial crisis, Chrysler introduced a facelifted model of the Caliber and discontinued the Avenger imports. From early 2012 onward, model year 2010 cars were available. By early 2012, no new cars were imported into Australia aside from the facelifted 2012 Journey.

There were rumors that Dodge cars would be rebadged as Fiats in the Australian market, as was the case in Europe. The Dodge nameplate continued due to consistent sales of the Journey. However, the brand was discontinued in the Australian market after 2016.

=== Brazil ===
In Brazil, Dodge cars were produced between 1969 and 1981 with the models Dart, Charger, Magnum, LeBaron (all powered by the same 318 cid V8 engine), and the compact 1800/Polara, based on the British Hillman Avenger. The manufacturer was acquired by Volkswagen in 1981. In 1998, the Dakota pickup started production in a new plant in Campo Largo, Paraná by Mercedes-Benz, which belonged to its former partner Daimler AG. It was built there until 2001, with petrol and diesel engines and regular, extended, and crew cabs. In 2010, Dodge started sales of the imported pickup Ram 2500. The model portfolio would be expanded starting with the Journey crossover for the 2009 model year. The marque ended the sales of its last product, the Journey, in 2019, remaining only to serve the existing customers.

=== Canada ===
In Canada, the Dodge lineup of cars started down the road to elimination along with the Plymouth line when the Dodge Dynasty was introduced in Canada as the Chrysler Dynasty in 1988 and sold at both Plymouth and Dodge dealers. Similarly, the Dodge Intrepid, the Dynasty's replacement, was sold as the Chrysler Intrepid.

For 2000, the Neon became the Chrysler Neon. The Chrysler Cirrus and Mitsubishi-built Dodge Avenger were dropped. Dodge trucks, which had been sold at Canadian Plymouth dealers since 1973, continued without change. All Plymouth-Chrysler and Dodge-Chrysler dealers became Chrysler-Dodge-Jeep dealers.

The diluting of the Chrysler name did not go well in Canada, especially as the nameplate had been pushed as a luxury line since the 1930s. For 2003, the revamped Neon appeared in Canada as the Dodge SX 2.0. Since then, all new Dodge models have been sold in Canada under the Dodge name.

=== Europe ===
Dodge started assembling lorries (trucks) in the United Kingdom from imported parts in 1922. In 1933, it began to manufacture a British chassis at its works in Kew, using American engines and gearboxes.

Right-hand drive Dodge trucks
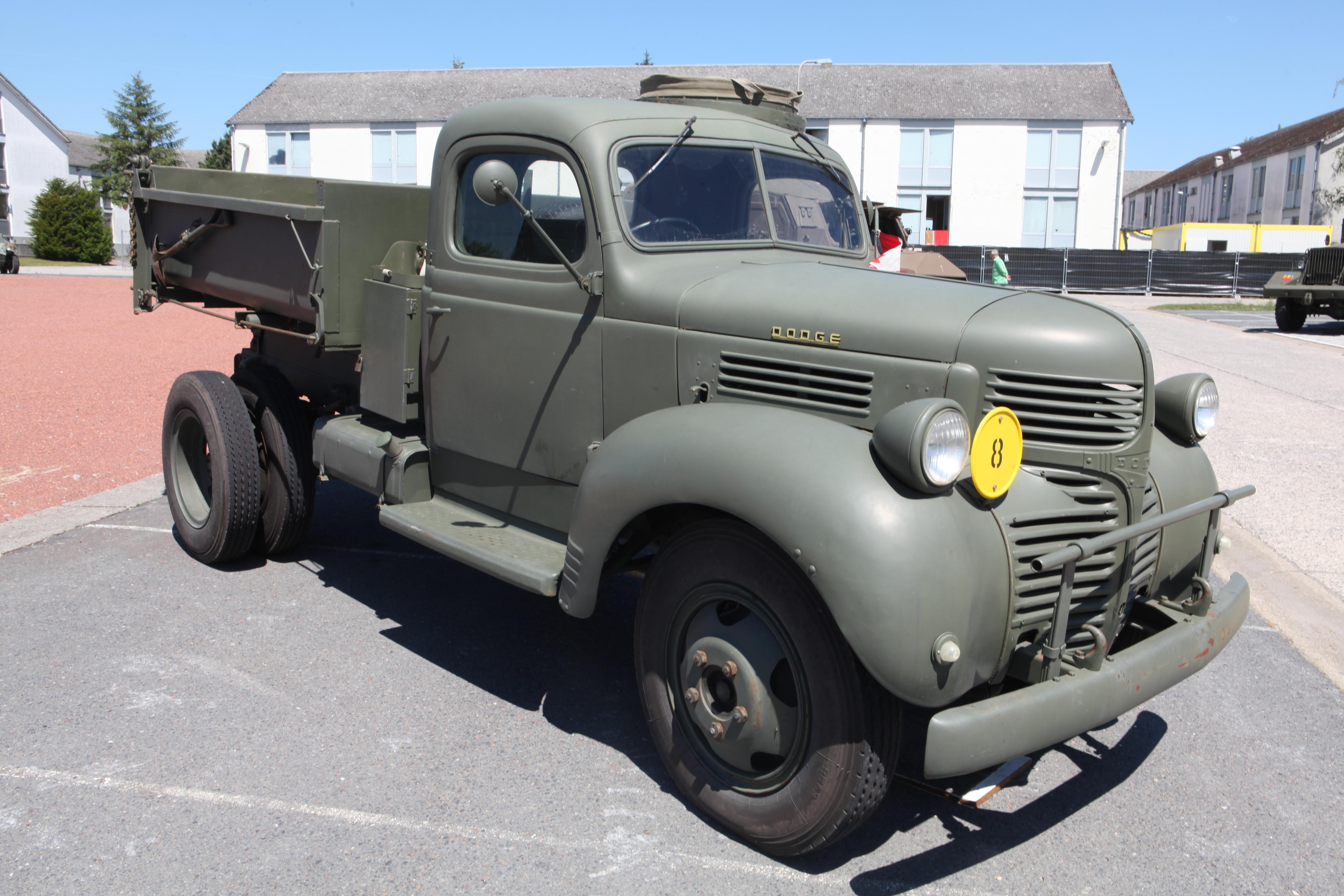
Dodge D15

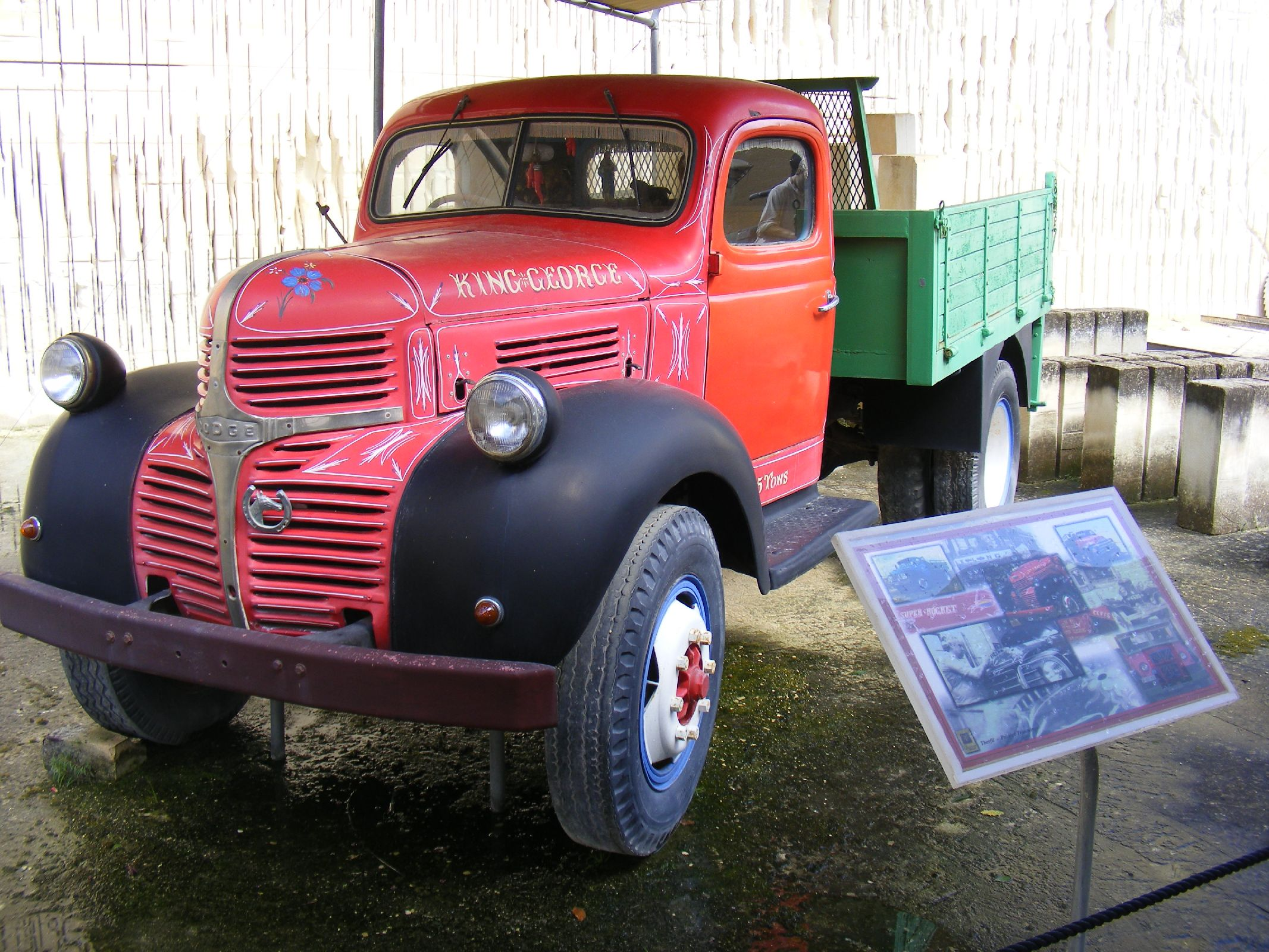
Dodge D15

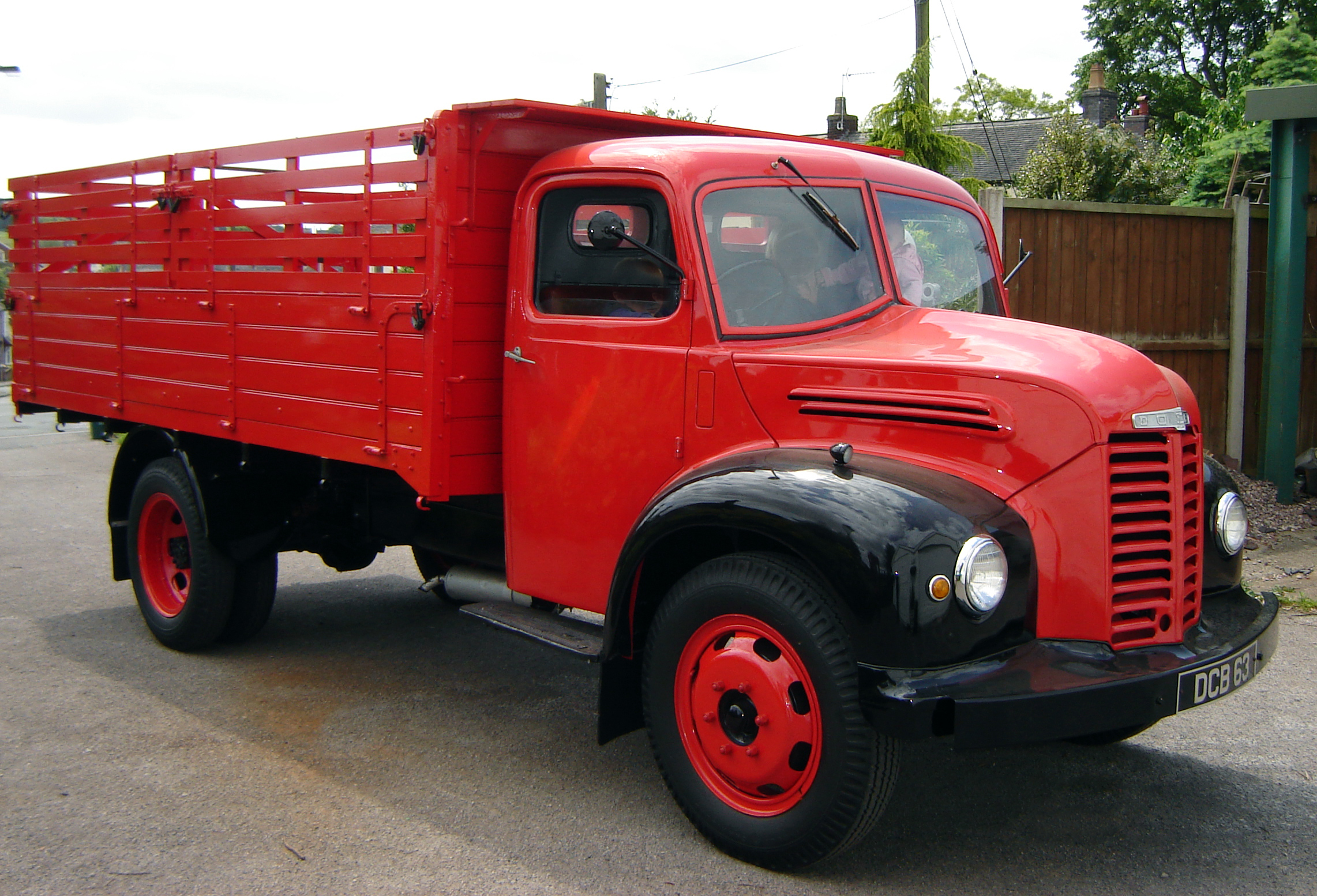
1952 Kew-built Dodge D100

During the World War II, Dodge Kew was part of the London Aircraft Production Group, building fuselage sections for Handley Page Halifax bombers. The pre-war and wartime truck range was replaced by the Dodge 100 "Kew" truck (1949–1957), nicknamed the "parrot nose" due to the sculpted lines of its bonnet. Subsequent normal-control Dodges built at Kew were the 200 series (1957–1963) and the 400 series (1963–1965). The 400 series was a version of the American D series medium-duty models. Also built at Kew were the cab-over 300 series (1957–1965) and its successor, the 500 series/K-series (1964–1978) tilt-cab. In 1964, Chrysler acquired its first stake in the British Rootes Group, and it was decided to consolidate all truck production at Rootes' factory in Dunstable. British assembly of the 400 series was discontinued due to declining sales of normal-control trucks, and production of the 500 series was transferred to Dunstable in 1967.

In some export markets, British-built Dodge trucks used the Fargo or DeSoto marques. The situation was further complicated after the takeover of the Rootes Group, whose commercial vehicles were sold under the Commer and Karrier marques. Some Dodge 500s were given Commer badges, whilst the 100 series "Commando" light truck (1970–1989), developed by Rootes, was initially marketed under all five marques. In the UK market, Commers were usually lighter than Dodges, whereas the Karrier marque tended to be used on vehicles sold to public sector operators such as local authorities. Some of the smaller Commer/Karrier vans were also sold as Fargos in export markets. In 1976, Chrysler Europe rationalized its marques and thereafter all the British-built commercial vehicles were sold as Dodges or (increasingly rarely) Karriers. This included the smaller Commer SpaceVan (1960–1983) and Commer Walk-Thru (1961–1979), which became Dodges for their final years. The van and pick-up versions of Chrysler Europe's French-built Simca 1100 were also branded as Dodges in Britain from 1976, although they remained Simcas elsewhere (and became Talbots in Britain after 1979).

Until the 1970s, American Chrysler cars, including some Dodge models, were assembled from CKD kits at various locations in Europe, including Kew (1920s-1930s), Antwerp (1926–1958), and Rotterdam (1958–1970). Sales volumes were low, as even "compact" American cars like the Dodge Dart were enormous gas-guzzlers by European standards. However, protectionist policies in some countries encouraged small local manufacturers to license-build CKD models, including AMAG in Switzerland (building Chryslers and Dodges 1948–1972) and Barreiros in Spain (building Dodge Darts from 1965 as the Barreiros Dart). By 1969, Chrysler had acquired full control of Barreiros, and Darts were being exported to other European countries under the Dodge name (precipitating the closure of the Rotterdam plant). In 1970, the Spanish-built Dart was replaced by the Barreiros/Dodge 3700, which remained in production until 1977. The Dodge cars were a relatively small part of the Madrid factory's output, which was dominated by smaller Simca-designed cars and Barreiros-designed heavy-duty trucks. From 1972 onward, such trucks were sold as the Dodge 300 (unrelated to the earlier British 300 series), which was available as 4×2, 6×4, 8×2, and 8×4 rigids, as well as 4×2 semi-trailer tractors.

Following Chrysler Europe's collapse in 1977 and the sale of their assets to Peugeot, the van and truck range and the associated factories in Dunstable and Madrid were quickly passed on to Renault Véhicules Industriels. Chrysler licensed the Dodge name to be used on Renault trucks sold in certain European markets, most notably the United Kingdom. However, the only subsequent new model to carry the Dodge name was the Dodge 50 series (1979–1992), which replaced the earlier Walk-Thru and was widely used in Britain by utility companies, the military, and as a minibus, but was rarely seen outside the UK. All new models thereafter were Renaults, and in 1987 the Dodge name was dropped from the remaining inherited models (50 and Commando), which became Renaults for their last few years of production. Dodge vehicles would not return to Europe until the introduction of the Neon, badged as a Chrysler, in the mid-1990s.

Chrysler reintroduced the Dodge marque to Europe on a broad scale in 2006, with a lineup consisting of North American-built Caliber, Avenger, Viper SRT-10, Nitro, and Journey cars and SUVs, but this proved to be a short-lived return due to the onset of the Great Recession and the takeover of Chrysler by Fiat. In 2010, the Dodge marque was pulled from the UK due to poor sales, and on June 1, 2011, it was dropped from the rest of Europe. All of the Dodge models were discontinued in Europe, except the Dodge Journey, which became the Fiat Freemont (and which was not available in the right-hand-drive Ireland or UK markets). The Dodge marque was reintroduced to many European markets in 2019.

=== India ===
The Dodge Kingsway was also assembled in India by Premier Automobiles Limited until the late 1950s.

=== Mexico ===
In Mexico, the Hyundai Accent, Hyundai Atos, and Hyundai H100 were branded as "Dodge", Dodge Attitude, "Verna by Dodge", "Atos by Dodge" and "Dodge H100", respectively, and sold at Chrysler/Dodge dealers during the 2000s and early 2010s. Dodge and Hyundai ended the venture, and Dodge began to sell rebadged and reworked Fiats and Mitsubishis.

== Logo evolution ==
- Star: The original Dodge was a circle, with two Greek deltas intertwined representing the letter "D", forming a six-pointed star in the middle; an interlocked "DB" was at the center of the star, and the words "Dodge Brothers Motor Vehicles" encircled the outside edge. Although similar to the Star of David, the Dodge brothers were not Jewish; they were Methodists. Although the "Brothers" was dropped from the name for trucks in 1929 and cars in 1930, the DB star remained in the cars until the 1939 models were introduced.
- Ram: For 1932, Dodge cars adopted a leaping ram as the car's hood ornament. Starting with the 1940 models, the leaping ram became more streamlined, with only the head, complete with curving horns, remaining by 1951. The 1954 models were the last to use the ram's head before its reintroduction in the 1980s. Dodge trucks adopted the ram as the hood ornament for the 1940 model year with the 1950 models as the last.
- Crest: For 1941, Dodge introduced a crest, supposedly the Dodge family crest. The design had four horizontal bars broken in the middle by one vertical bar with an "O" in the center. A knight's head appeared at the top of the emblem. Although the head would be dropped for 1955, the emblem would survive through 1957 and reappear on the 1976 Aspen. The crest would be used through 1981 on its second time around, being replaced by the Pentastar for 1982. The knight's head without the crest would be used for 1959.
- Forward Look: Virgil Exner's radical Forward Look redesign of Chrysler's vehicles for the 1955 model year was emphasized by the adoption of a logo by the same name, applied to all Chrysler Corporation vehicles. The Forward Look logo consisted of two overlapped boomerang shapes, suggesting space age rocket-propelled motion. This logo was incorporated into Dodge advertising, decorative trim, ignition and door key heads, as well as on accessories through September 1962.
- Fratzog: Dodge's logo from September 1962 through 1981 was a fractured deltoid composed of three arrowhead shapes forming a three-pointed star. The logo first appeared on the 1962 Polara 500 and the mid-year 1962 Custom 880. One of its designers came up with the meaningless name Fratzog for the logo, which ultimately stuck. In 2021, Dodge announced that it would revive the Fratzog logo as a secondary emblem used exclusively to denote electric vehicles.
- Pentastar: From 1982 until 1995, Dodge used Chrysler's Pentastar logo on its cars and trucks to replace the Dodge crest, although it had been used for corporate recognition since late 1962. In advertisements and on dealer signage, Dodge's Pentastar was red, while Chrysler-Plymouth's was blue.
- Ram's head: Dodge reintroduced the ram's head hood ornament on the new 1973 Dodge Bighorn heavy-duty tractor units. The ram's head gradually began appearing on the pickup trucks as Dodge began to refer to their trucks as Ram. The present iteration of the Ram's-head logo appeared in late 1992 on the 1993 Intrepid, standardizing that logo in 1996 for all vehicles except the Viper, which uses the Viper's Head.
- Racing stripes: In 2010, with the separation of the Ram brand, Dodge introduced a new logo, initially used solely for marketing purposes, consisting of a wordmark with two diagonal racing stripes. The company stated that the emblem was meant to honor the brand's heritage of sports cars.
- Return to the Fratzog: In 2025, Dodge began using the Fratzog logo, beginning exclusively for the next-gen Dodge Charger.
Dodge logo evolution
Dodge Brothers emblem c. 1910, removed from the gate of the "Dodge Main" before its 1981 demolition

1914 Dodge Brothers logo

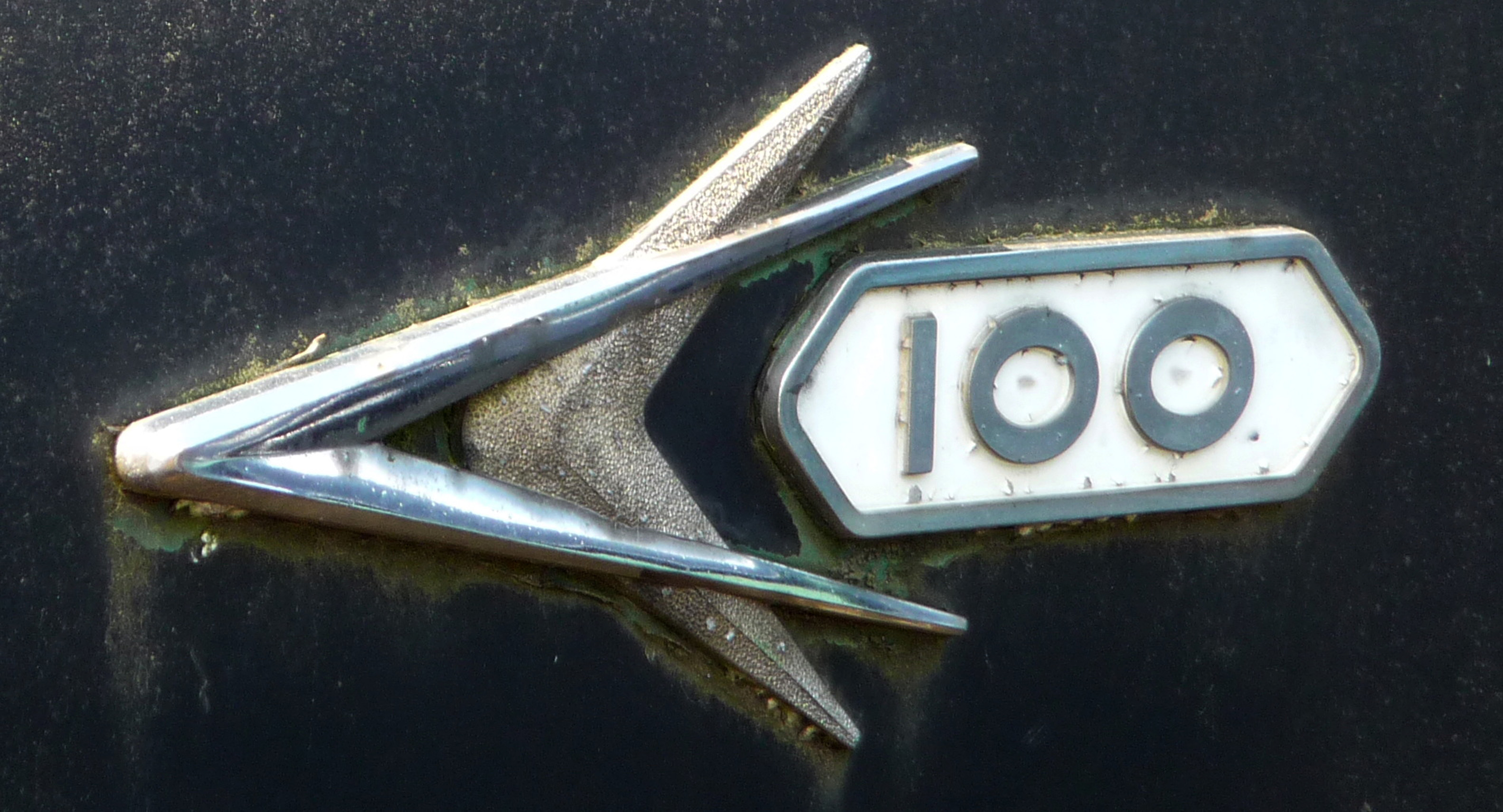
Forward Look, 1955–1962

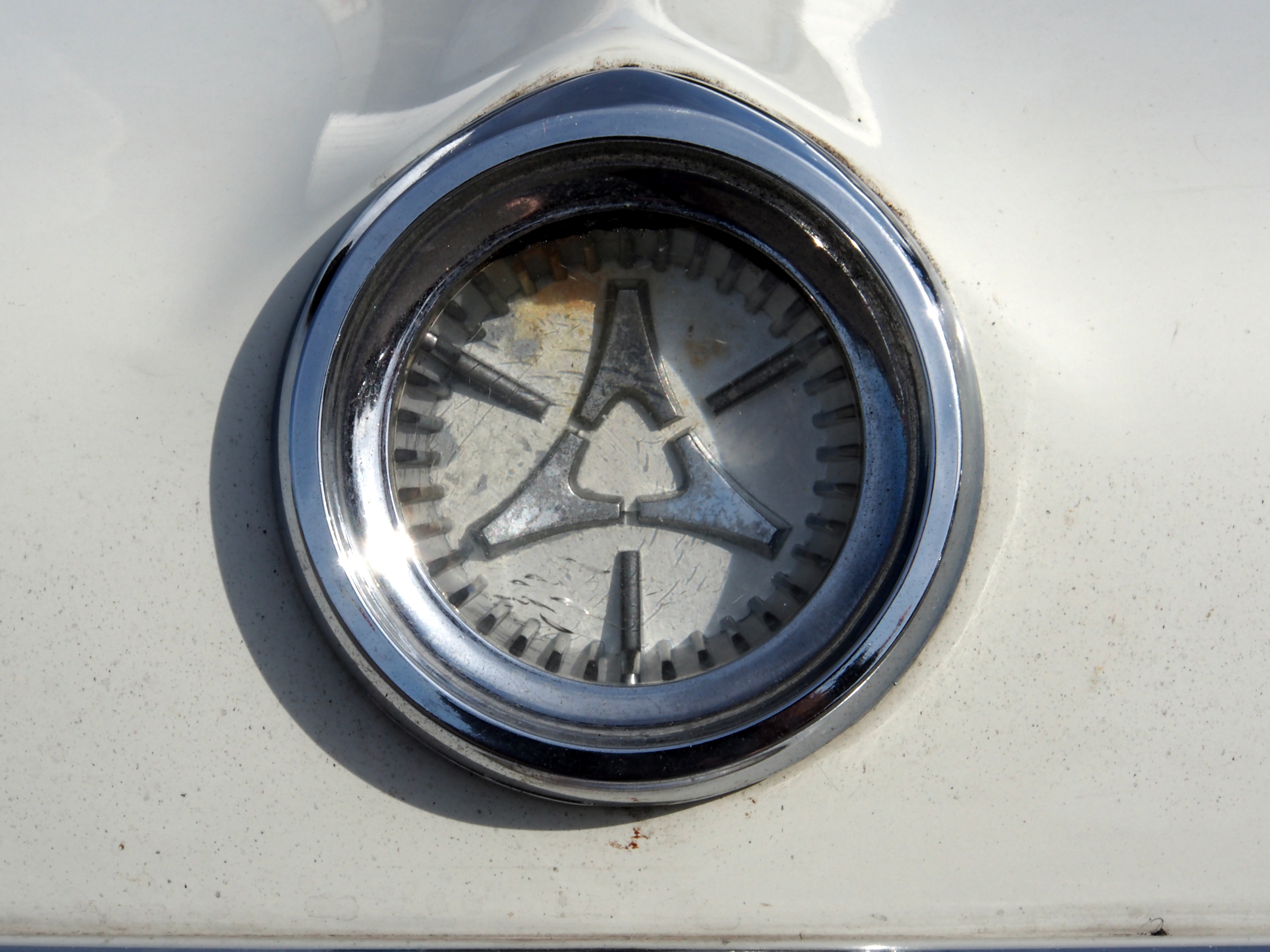
Fratzog, 1962–1981

Red Chrysler Pentastar logo, 1966–1996

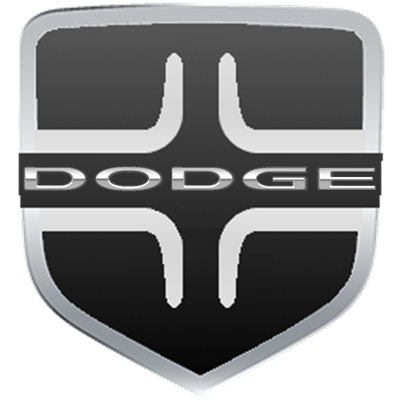
Cross-haired grille logo which replaced the ram's head starting in 2011

Textured metal word, 2010–2015

Dodge logo used from 2016–2024

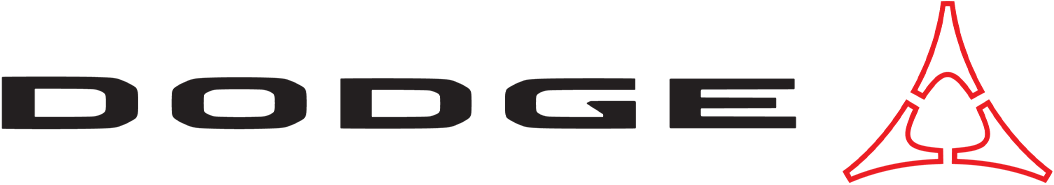
Current logo used from 2025 onwards

== Slogans ==
- Dependability, The Dependables (1920s–1967)
- Join the Dodge Rebellion (1966–1967) Dodge Performance Cars
- Dodge Fever (1968–1969)
- You Could Be Dodge Material (1970–1971)
- An American Revolution (1982–1989) (slogan recycled by Chevrolet in 2005)
- The New Spirit of Dodge (1989)
- The Tough New Spirit of Dodge Truck (1989)
- The New Dodge (1992–1999)
- Dodge Different (1999–2001)
- Grab Life by the Horns (2001–2007, mainly for the Dodge truck market)
- Grab Life (2007 – mid-June 2010, in Ram pickup truck ads)
- Never Neutral (2010–present)
- Born Dodge (2014–present)
- Domestic. Not Domesticated. (2016–present)
- Excess drives success (2021–present)
- Tear up the streets... not the planet (2021–present)

== List of Dodge automobiles ==
=== Current models ===
Model	Year
Attitude	2006–present (Mexico only)
Charger	1966–1978; 1983–87; 2006–present
Durango	1998–2009; 2011–present
Journey	2021–present (Mexico only)

=== Past models ===
Model	Year
50 series	1979–1993
100 "Commando"	1970–1980
100 "Kew"	1949–1957
300	1957–1965
330	1963–1964
400	1982–1983
440	1962–1964
500	1964–unknown
600	1983–1988
A100	1964–1970
Attitude	2006
Aries	1981–1989
Aspen	1976–1980
Avenger	1995–2000; 2008–2014
B Series	1948–1953
C Series	1950–1960
Caliber	2006–2012
Challenger (E-body)	1970–1974
Challenger	1970–74; 1978–83; 2008–2023
Challenger (Mitsubishi)	1978–1983
Charger (B-body)	1966–1978
Charger (sedan)	2006–2023
Charger (L-body)	1981–1987
Colt	1971–1994
Crusader	1951–1958
Coronet	1949–1959; 1965–1976
Custom	1946–1948
Custom 880	1962–1965
Custom Royal	1955–1959
D5/D6/D7	1937
D8/D9/D10	1938
D Series	1961–1993
Dakota	1987–2011
Dart (original)	1960–1976
Dart (PF)	2013–2016
Daytona	1984–1993
Deluxe	1946–1948
Diplomat	1977–1989
Dynasty	1988–1993
Fast Four	1927–1928
Grand Caravan	1984–2020
Hornet	2022–2025 (U.S. and Canada only)
Intrepid	1993–2004
Journey	2009–2020
Kingsway	1946–1959
La Femme	1955–1956
Lancer	1955–1959; 1961–1962; 1985–1989
Magnum	1978–1979; 2005–2008
Matador	1960
Mayfair	1953–1959
Meadowbrook	1949–1954
Mirada	1980–1983
Monaco	1965–1978; 1990–1992
Neon	1995-2005
Nitro	2006–2012
Omni	1978–1990
Omni 024	1979–1982
Omni (GLH)	1984–1986
Phoenix	1960–1973
Polara	1960–1973
Power Wagon	1945–1980
Raider	1987–1989
Ram 50	1979–1996
Ram Pickup	1981–2009
Ram SRT 10	2004–2006
Ram Van	1971–2003
Ramcharger	1974–2001
Rampage	1982–1984
Regent	1951–1960
Royal	1954–1959
Shadow	1987–1994
Sierra	1955–1956
Spirit	1989–1995
Sprinter	2004–2009
SRT-4	2003–2005
St. Regis	1979–1981
Stealth	1991–1996
Stratus	1995–2006
Town Panel / Wagon	1954–1966
Travco	1964–late 1980s
Victory	1928–1929
Viscount	1959
Vision	2015–2019
Viper	1992–2010; 2012–2017
Wayfarer	1949–1952
WC series	1940–1945

== See also ==
- DeSoto (automobile)
- Plymouth (automobile)
- Rootes Group for the historic Dodge of the UK
- Fargo (truck)
- List of automobile manufacturers of the United States
- List of Dodge automobiles for all production cars and trucks
- List of Dodge concept vehicles
- Ram Trucks
- Dodge Airflow truck
- Barreiros (manufacturer)

== Bibliography ==
- Brinkley, Douglas (2004). Wheels for the world: Henry Ford, his company, and a century of progress, 1903-2003. New York: Penguin Books. ISBN 9780142004395.
- Burness, Tad (2001). Ultimate truck & van spotter's guide, 1925-1990. Krause Publications. ISBN 9780873419697.
- Gunnell, John A., ed. (1987). The Standard Catalog of American Cars 1946–1975. Krause Publications. ISBN 9780873410960.
- Gunnell, John A., ed. (1993). Standard catalog of American light-duty trucks (Second ed.). Krause Publications. ISBN 9780873412384.
- Hyde, Charles K (2003). Riding The Rollercoaster A History Of The Chrysler Corporation. Detroit, Michigan: Wayne State University Press. ISBN 0-8143-3091-6.
- Lenzke, James T., ed. (2000). Standard catalog of Chrysler, 1914-2000 (Second ed.). Krause Publications. ISBN 9780873418829.
- Ruiz, Marco (1986). Japanese car. New York: Portland House. ISBN 9780517617779.
- Vlasic, Bill; Stertz, Bradley A. (2000). Taken for a ride: how Daimler-Benz drove off with Chrysler. New York: W. Morrow. ISBN 9780688173050.
