= Dodge Challenger (2008) =

Muscle car

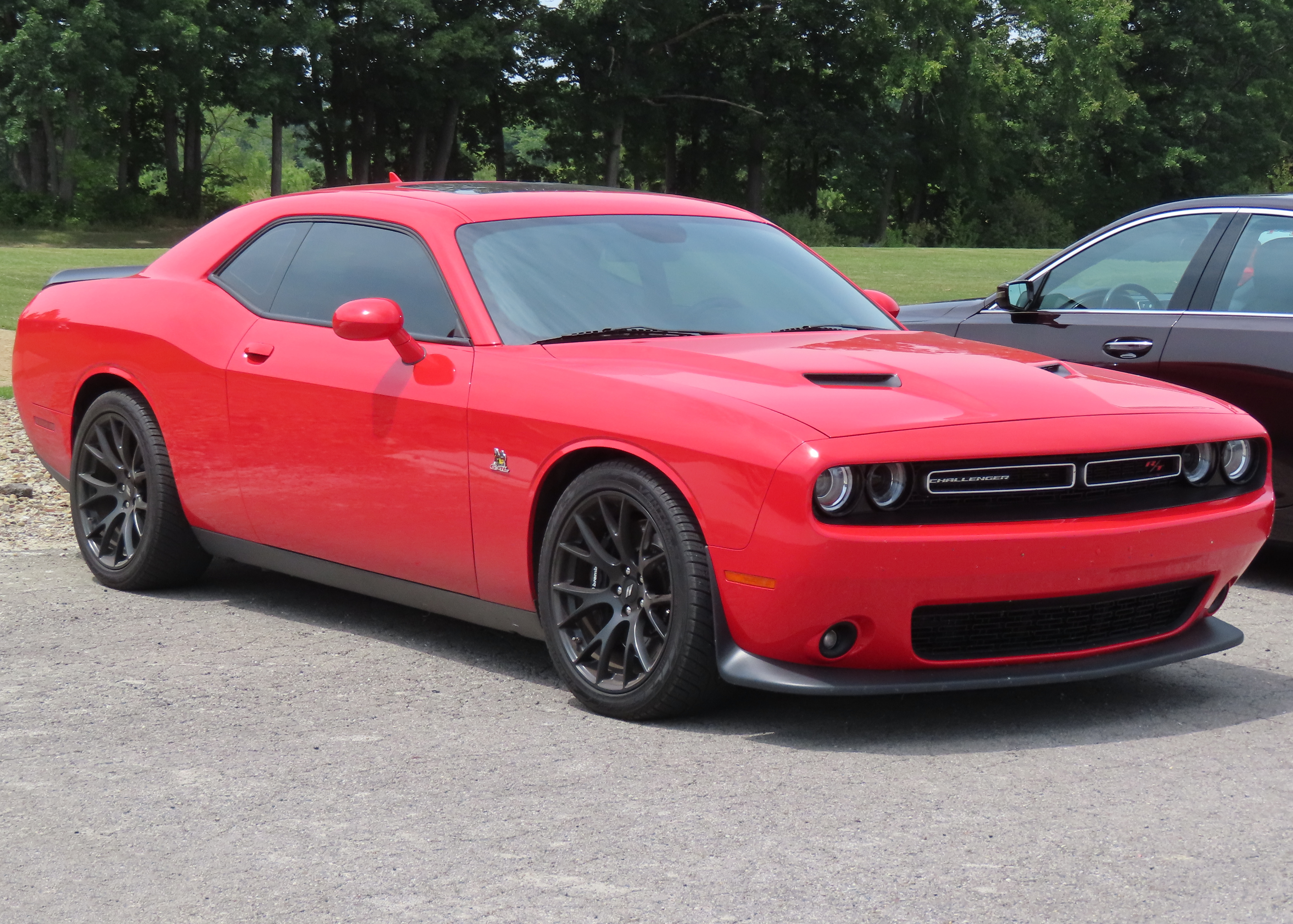
- 2017 Dodge Challenger R/T Scat Pack

Overview
- Manufacturer: Dodge (Note: Chrysler Group LLC (2009–2014); FCA US LLC (2014–2021); Stellantis North America (2021–2023))
- Production: 2008–2023
- Model years: 2008–2023
- Assembly: Canada: Brampton, Ontario (Brampton Assembly)
- Designer: Brian Nielander, Michael Castiglione

Body and chassis
- Class: Pony car; Muscle car
- Body style: 2-door coupe
- Layout: Front engine, rear-wheel drive Front engine, all-wheel drive (2017-2023 GT/SXT only)

Powertrain
- Engine: 3.5 L (215 cu in) EGG V6; 3.6 L (220 cu in) Pentastar V6; 5.7 L (345 cu in) EZB/EZD HEMI V8; 6.1 L (370 cu in) ESF HEMI V8; 6.2 L (376 cu in) Hellcat supercharged V8; 6.4 L (392 cu in) ESG HEMI V8
- Transmission: 4-speed 42RLE automatic (2009–2010 3.5L RWD); 5-speed W5A580 automatic (2008–2010 6.1L V8; 2009–2014 5.7L V8; 2010 3.5L V6; 2011–2014 3.6L V6/6.4L V8); 6-speed TR-6060 manual (R/T, R/T Scat pack, 2015–2023 Hellcat); 8-speed ZF 8HP automatic (all Facelift models)

Dimensions
- Wheelbase: 2,950 mm (116.14 in)
- Length: 5,020 mm (197.64 in)
- Width: 1,920 mm (75.59 in)
- Height: 1,450 mm (57.09 in)

Chronology
- Predecessor: Dodge Challenger (1970)
- Successor: Dodge Charger (eighth generation)

The Dodge Challenger is a full-size muscle car that was introduced in early 2008 originally as a rival to the evolved fifth-generation Ford Mustang and the fifth-generation Chevrolet Camaro.

In November 2021, Stellantis announced that 2023 model year would be the final model year for both the LD Dodge Charger and LA Dodge Challenger, as the company will focus its future plans on electric vehicles rather than fossil fuel powered vehicles, due to tougher emissions standards required by the Environmental Protection Agency for the 2023 model year. Challenger production ended on December 22, 2023, and the Brampton, Ontario assembly plant will be re-tooled to assemble an electrified successor.

== Model history ==
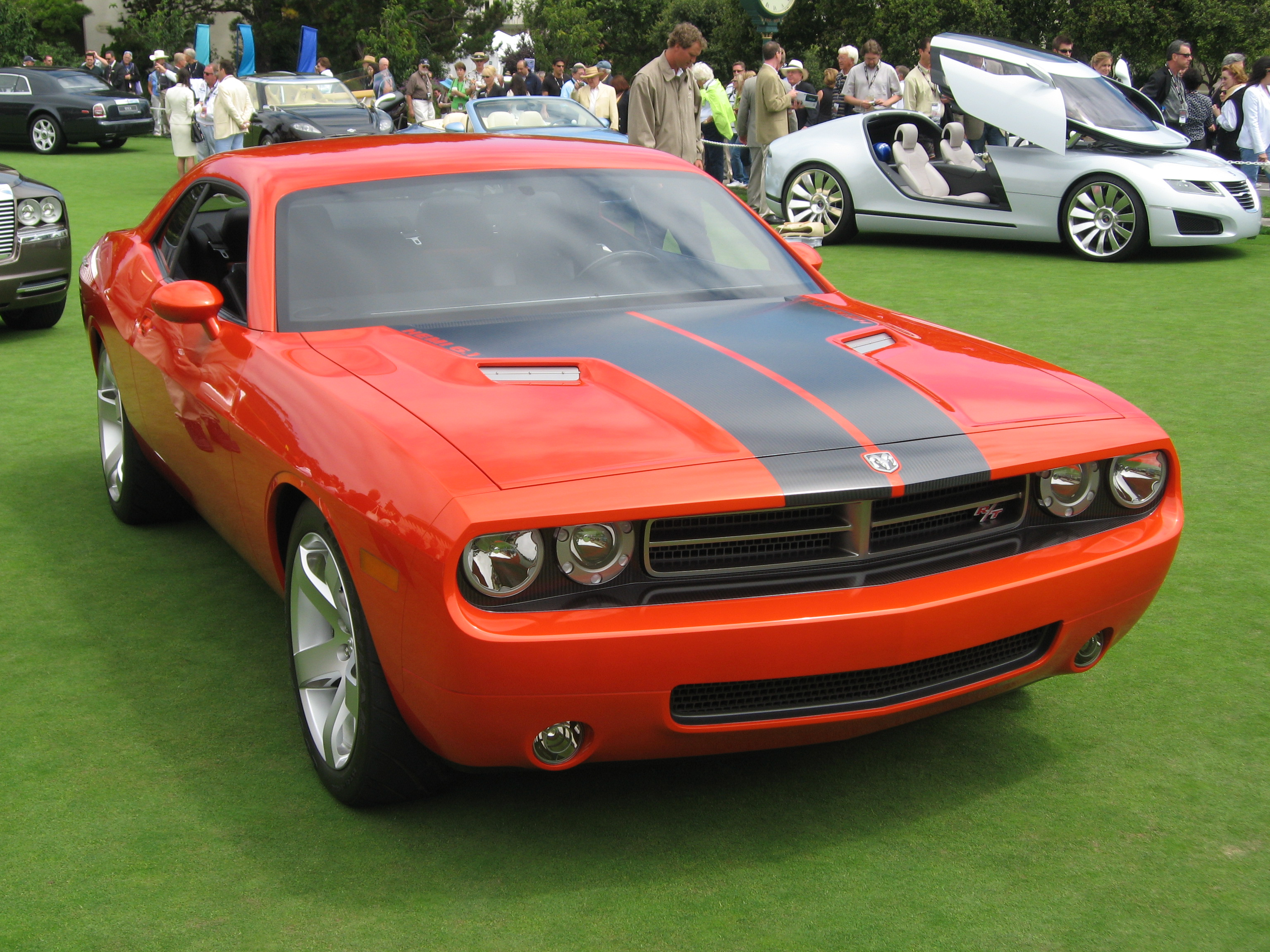
2006 Dodge Challenger Concept

In late 2005, Dodge teased spy photos of the Dodge Challenger prototype on the internet and it was announced on November 21, 2005, showing an official drawing sketch of the vehicle. The Dodge Challenger Concept was unveiled at the 2006 North American International Auto Show and was a preview for the 3rd generation Dodge Challenger that started its production in 2008. Many design cues of the Dodge Challenger Concept were adapted from the 1970 Dodge Challenger R/T.

=== Initial release ===
On December 3, 2007, Chrysler started taking deposits for the 3rd-generation Dodge Challenger which debuted on February 6, 2008, simultaneously at the Chicago Auto Show and Philadelphia International Auto Show. Listing at US$40,095, the new version was a 2-door notchback coupe (seating 5 passengers with over 33 cubic feet (930 L) of rear passenger volume) which shared common design elements with the first generation Challenger, despite being significantly longer and taller. As with Chevrolet's new Camaro, the Challenger concept car's pillarless hardtop body was replaced with a fixed "B" pillar, hidden behind the side glass to give an illusion of the hardtop. A convertible version was planned, but cancelled over concerns with weight and a low market demand for convertibles. The LC chassis is a modified (shortened wheelbase) version of the LX platform that underpins the Dodge Charger (LX), Dodge Magnum, and the Chrysler 300. The LX was developed in America from the previous Chrysler LH platform, which had been designed to allow it to be easily upgraded to rear and all-wheel drive. Many Mercedes components were incorporated, or used for inspiration, including the Mercedes-Benz W220 S-class control arm front suspension, the Mercedes-Benz W211 E-Class 5-link rear suspension, the W5A580 5-speed automatic, the rear differential, and the ESP system. All (7119) 2008 models were SRT8s and equipped with the 6.1 L (370 cu in) Hemi V8 engine and a 5-speed AutoStick automatic transmission. The entire 2008 Canadian produced run of 6,400 US market cars were pre-sold and production commenced on May 8, 2008.

Chrysler of Mexico offered only 100 SRT8s, with a 6.1 liter V8 engine rated at 425 horsepower (317 kW; 431 PS) (SAE). Chrysler auctioned off two 2008 SRT8s for charity with the first car going for US$400,000 and a "B5" Blue No.43 car with a winning bid of US$228,143.43.

The base model Challenger SE was initially powered by a 3.5 L (214 cu in) SOHC V6 engine rated at 250 hp (186 kW; 253 PS) (SAE) and 250 lbf⋅ft (339 N⋅m; 35 kg⋅m) of torque which was coupled to a 4-speed automatic transmission for the first half of 2009, and was then changed to have a standard 5-speed automatic transmission. Several different exterior colors, with either cloth or leather interiors became available. Standard features included air conditioning, power windows, locks, and mirrors; cruise control, and 17-inch (430 mm) aluminum wheels. The Canadian market also sports the SXT trim, similar to the SE, but more generous in terms of standard features. Some of these features being ESP, an alarm system, and 18-inch (460 mm) wheels. Starting with the 2012 model year, the SE was replaced in the U.S. with the SXT model.

Previous to the 2012 model year, the SXT version of the Challenger was only sold in Canada and is a more well-equipped variation of the SE. It adds fog lamps, a rear spoiler, larger wheels, illuminated vanity mirrors, a security alarm, and a leather-wrapped shifter. In addition, the SXT has increased option packages available to it that aren't available on the SE, and are also available to the R/T.

==== Challenger 500 ====
Chrysler Canada offered a further 670 SRTs uniquely badged as the Challenger 500 (paying homage to Charger and Coronet 500s) all of which were shipped to Canadian Dodge dealers.

=== 2009 model year ===
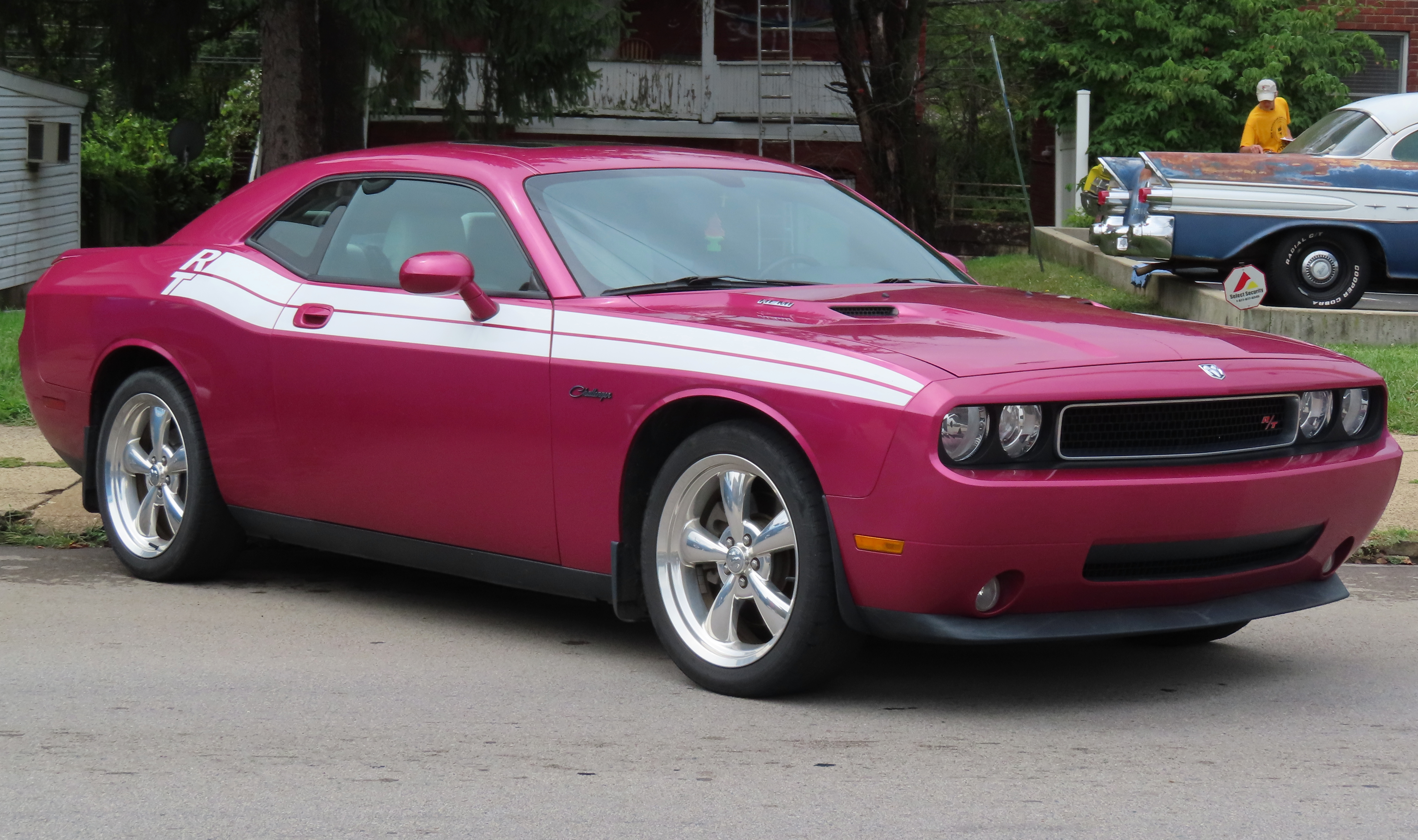
2010 Dodge Challenger R/T Classic

Production of the limited edition 2008 SRT8s ended in July 2008, and production of the expanded 2009 line-up started in early August of the same year. The expanded offering was the same as had been unveiled earlier that spring at the 2008 New York Auto Show. Chrysler debuted the full Dodge Challenger line-up for 2009, with four different trims – SE, R/T, SRT8, and the SXT in Canada only. In addition to the SRT8, which remained unchanged except for the optional 6-speed manual and standard limited-slip differential, the line-up included the previously mentioned SE and SXT which offered the 250 hp (186 kW) 3.5 L V6. The R/T included a 5.7 L Hemi rated at 372 hp (277 kW; 377 PS) and 398 lb⋅ft (540 N⋅m; 55 kg⋅m) of torque when coupled with the 5-speed automatic, and 375 hp (280 kW; 380 PS) with 404 lb⋅ft (548 N⋅m; 56 kg⋅m) when matched with the same Tremec 6-speed manual transmission as the SRT8.

New for 2009 was the Rallye Package for the SE model. The package featured design cues including dual body stripes on the hood and the trunk, chromed fuel cap, decklid spoiler, 18-inch aluminum wheels, and Micro Carbon interior accents.

The mid-level Challenger R/T is powered by a 5.7 L (345 cu in) Hemi V8 coupled to a 5-speed automatic transmission or a Tremec TR-6060 6-speed manual transmission. On cars equipped with the automatic transmission, the engine features the Multi-Displacement System and is rated at 372 hp (277 kW; 377 PS) (SAE) and 398 lb⋅ft (540 N⋅m; 55 kg⋅m) of torque. With the 6-speed manual transmission, the Multi-Displacement System option was deleted and the engine is rated at 375 hp (280 kW; 380 PS) (SAE) and 404 lb⋅ft (548 N⋅m; 56 kg⋅m) of torque. Another feature was the Intelligent Deceleration Fuel Shut-Off (iDFSO) available for the automatic models only. The first to combine both a Multi-Displacement system and fuel shut-off. The final drive ratio was 3.06:1 on cars with the automatic transmission, 3.73:1 on cars with the 6-speed manual and 18-inch (460 mm) wheels or 3.92:1 with the 6-speed manual and optional 20-inch (510 mm) wheels. Also available on R/T was the "Track Pak" option group, which includes the Tremec manual transmission, a limited slip differential, and self-leveling rear shock absorbers.

The Challenger R/T Classic has retro aspects such as script "Challenger" badges on the front panels and black or white "R/T" stripes. It comes with a five-speed automatic standard, with an optional six-speed manual transmission including a pistol-grip-shifter. The wheels are Heritage 20-inch Torq-Thrust style specials. It became available in Brilliant Black Crystal Pearl, Bright Silver Metallic, Stone White, and in multiple "heritage" colors: Toxic Orange, HEMI-Orange, TorRed, B5 Blue, Plum Crazy Purple, Detonator Yellow, and Furious Fuchsia. Production started in February 2009.

The 2009 SRT8, while still equipped with the 6.1 L (370 cu in) Hemi V8, was virtually identical to its 2008 counterpart, with the main difference being the choice of either a 5-speed automatic or 6-speed manual transmission. Standard features include Brembo brakes, a sport suspension, bi-xenon headlamps, heated leather sport seats, keyless go, Sirius satellite radio, and 20-inch (510 mm) forged aluminum wheels in addition to most amenities offered on the R/T and SE models such as air conditioning and cruise control. In addition, the 2009 had a "limited slip" differential that was not offered on the 2008 model. A "Spring Special" SRT8 Challenger was also offered in B5 Blue, but due to rolling plant shutdowns, approximately 250 Spring Special Challengers were built before the end of the 2009 model year.

The Mopar '10 Challenger R/T is a limited version of the 2010 Challenger R/T with metallic pearl black body color, three accent colors (blue, red, silver) of stripes to choose from. In addition, these cars were available with black R/T Classic-style wheels along with a Hurst aftermarket pistol grip shifter, custom badging, Mopar cold air intake for a ten-horsepower increase, and a Katzkin-sourced aftermarket interior. The cars were built in Brampton Assembly and completed at the Mopar Upfit Center in Windsor, Ontario. There were 500 U.S. units and 100 Canadian units built. Of the 500 Mopar special edition U.S. versions, 320 had automatic transmissions, 180 had manuals, while 255 had blue stripes, 115 had red stripes, and 130 had silver stripes. A limited numbered run of 400 SRTs in 2010 were produced with "Furious Fuchsia" paint and white leather seats with horizontal fuchsia-colored slash bars on the backrests. Special badging on the passenger side dash script denotes the production number of each individual car ranging from the numbers 1 to 400. Dodge marketed this package as an homage to the original Panther Pink cars 40 years previous. These cars came with both automatic and Tremec six-speed transmissions.

The Drag Race Package is a race model designed for NHRA competition, based on the Dodge Challenger SRT8. The car is 1,000 lb (454 kg) lighter than the street vehicle by eliminating major production components and systems. To accentuate the weight savings, they also feature added composite, polycarbonate, and lightweight components designed for drag racing that is part of the new Package Car program. The engine was repositioned to improve the driveline angle and weight distribution. The 116-inch (2,900 mm) wheelbase was shortened by ½ inch. The car also features a front cradle with bolt-in crossmember and solid engine mounts.

At least 50 Challenger Drag Race Package Cars were built to meet NHRA requirements. Engine options include a 6.1 L Hemi, 5.7 Hemi, and a 5.9 L Magnum Wedge. Manual or automatic transmissions are available, and the rear axle is solid (not IRS). An initial run of the required 50 cars was completed and over 100 of the "2009 Challenger Drag Pak" vehicles were produced. "Big Daddy" Don Garlits bought the first drag race package car and raced it in NHRA competition. The prototype cars shown at SEMA were built by MPR Racing of Michigan, who continue to modify the production cars as delivered from Chrysler.

=== 2010 model year ===
In its second year of production, the Challenger received only a few minor feature and option changes. Electronic stability control is newly standard across the entire Challenger model line. R/T models gained the following standard features: automatic headlamps, an LED-lit cupholder, and door-handle lights. UConnect Multimedia and UConnect Navigation options now include steering wheel-mounted audio controls while UConnect Multimedia features have been combined with the optional Sound Group.

The most significant new option for 2010 is the Super Track Pack, which brings a host of track-ready hardware and upgrades that includes:

- 20x9-inch wheels with Goodyear F1 Super Car tires
- Front and rear Sachs Nivomat self-leveling shock absorbers
- Larger rear stabilizer bar (20mm > 16mm stock)
- Variable-displacement performance steering pump (standard on 6-speed)
- 3.06 rear-axle ratio (n/a on 6-speed R/Ts which maintain 3.92 ratio)
- Anti-lock 4-wheel disc heavy-duty brakes with performance brake linings
- "ESP-off" stability calibration. A limited-slip differential remained standard only on R/Ts equipped with the 6-speed manual transmission.

=== 2011 model year ===
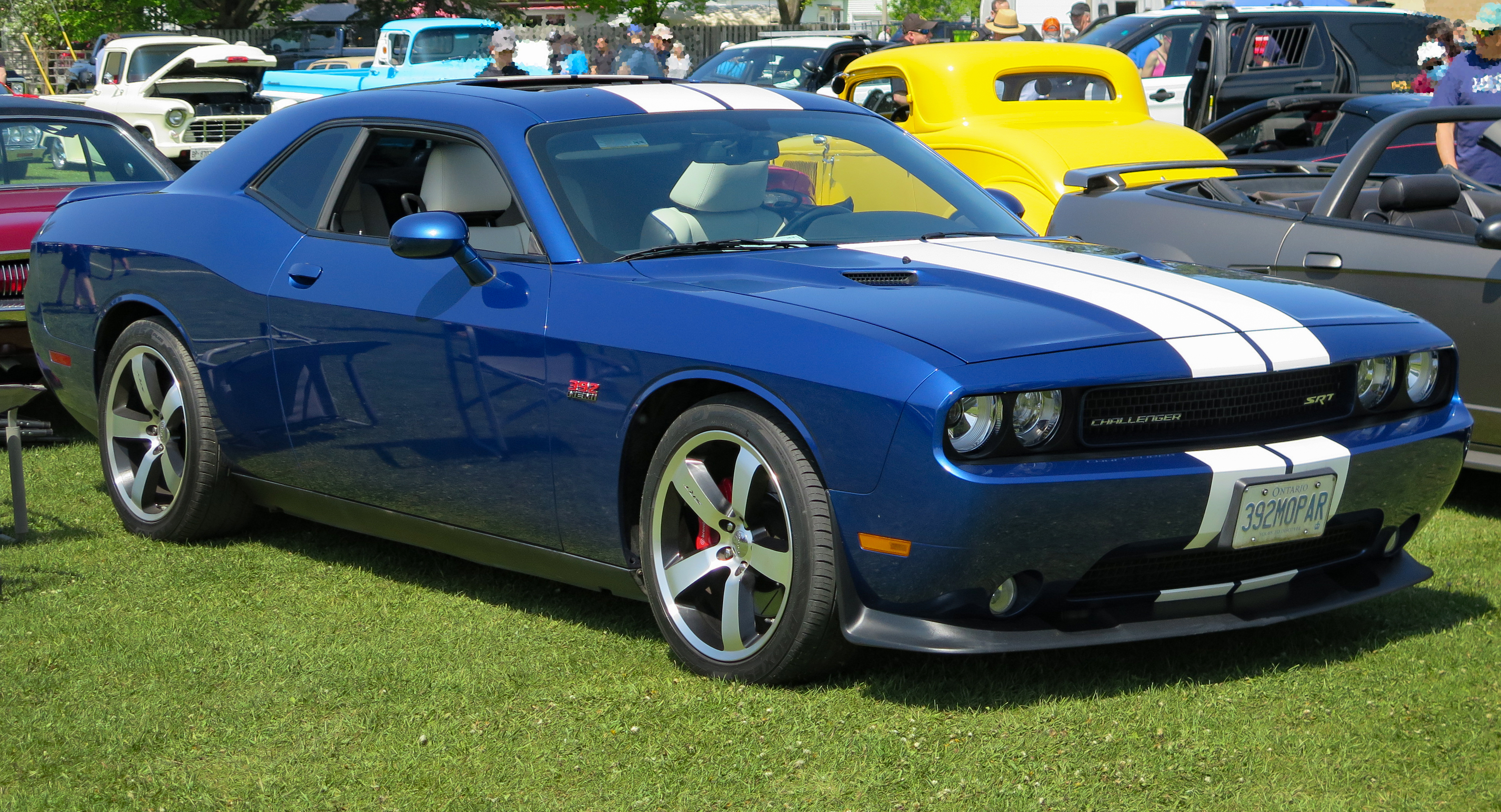
2011 Dodge Challenger SRT8

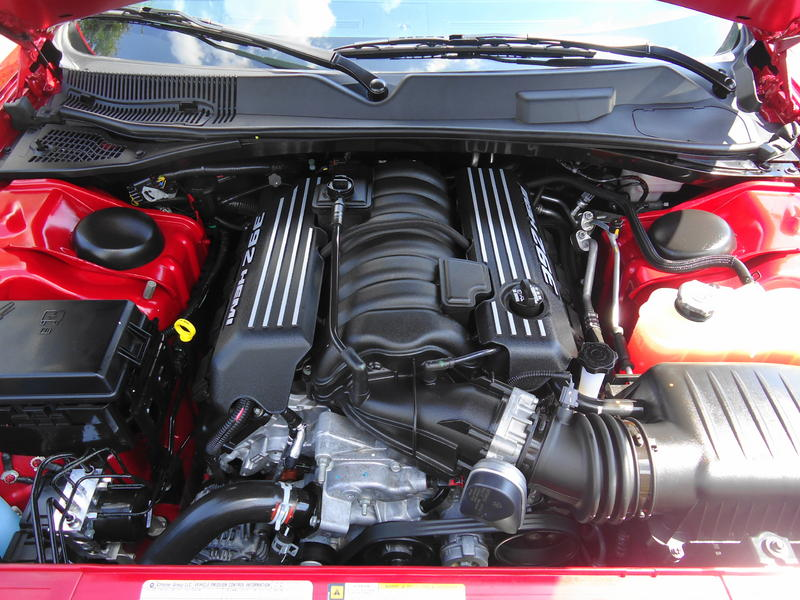
6.4-liter Hemi V8 engine

The Ram emblem disappeared with the 2011 model year (as the namesake truck was being spun off as its own brand), and Challengers received two new engines, the Pentastar, and a 392 Hemi.

- The SE and SE Rallye received the new 3.6-liter Pentastar V6 engine rated at 305 hp (227 kW; 309 PS) and 268 lb⋅ft (363 N⋅m; 37 kg⋅m), dual rear exhaust with bright tips, a five-speed automatic transmission with AutoStick, 18-inch aluminum wheels, advanced brake systems including: four-wheel disc antilock brakes, brake assist, ready alert braking and rain brake support, electronic stability control (ESC), with hill start assist and all-speed traction control, a chrome fuel filler door, Uconnect 130 System with AM/FM radio, CD player, six speakers and auxiliary input jack, steering wheel-mounted audio and speed control, twin hood scoops, touring suspension, remote keyless entry, six airbags, active front head restraints, premium cloth seating, six-way power driver seat with four-way power lumbar adjust, a leather-wrapped steering wheel, air conditioning with automatic temperature control, keyless enter and go with proximity sensor and push button start, power windows, locks and mirrors along with a tilt/telescoping steering column and 60/40 folding rear seats that include a rear armrest with cup holders.
- In 2011, the Challenger Rallye Package added dual red out-lined center stripes, premium leather interior with heated front seats, body-color rear spoiler, performance-tuned steering with sport suspension and handling package, further upgraded brakes, and unique Foose designed 18-inch Rallye wheels.
- The R/T received revisions including a new bottom grille cutout and an updated suspension.
- The new SRT8's chin spoiler was enlarged to create more downforce. It resembles the 1970 Challenger R/T. The SRT8 received a new 6.4-liter Hemi V8. The 392 was officially rated at 470 hp (350 kW; 477 PS) and 470 lb⋅ft (637 N⋅m; 65 kg⋅m) of torque. Dodge engineers stated they sacrificed peak horsepower ratings for low-end torque, stating a 90 lb⋅ft (122 N⋅m; 12 kg⋅m) increase over the outgoing 6.1-L (370 c.i.d.) Hemi V8 at 2,900 rpm. Two transmissions were offered: a 5-Speed Shiftable Automatic and a 6-speed manual. With the revised 6.4-liter engine, Chrysler engineers cited a quarter mile (~400 m) time of 12.4 seconds at 110 mph (177 km/h) – bettering the outgoing 6.1 L Hemi by 0.8 seconds, although that figure has varied wildly between automotive magazines. Car and Driver tested the 392 at 12.9 seconds at 114 mph (183 km/h) while Motor Trend tested it at 13.0 seconds at 111.3 mph (179.1 km/h) and Edmunds' number was far closer to Chrysler's claimed numbers at 12.6 seconds at 112.1 mph (180.4 km/h).
- Top speeds of the 2011 Dodge Challenger R/T and 2011 Dodge Challenger SRT8 were both rated at 170 mph (274 km/h). The R/T has a 0–60 mph (0–97 km/h) acceleration time of 5.00 seconds, while the SRT8 accelerates to 60 mph (97 km/h) in 4.50 seconds.

=== 2012 model year ===
The base SE trim was renamed to SXT for consistency with the naming scheme of the remaining Dodge lineup. The SRT8 392 model gains a two-mode adaptive suspension system that features an Auto and Sport mode. The car uses a variety of sensors to measure inputs like vehicle speed, steering angle, brake torque, throttle position, and acceleration forces to instantly tune the suspension for the given condition depending on what mode is chosen. In addition, a new heated steering wheel featuring Chrysler's new paddle shifter system, new sport seats, and a 900-watt Harman Kardon audio system became available.

=== 2013 model year ===
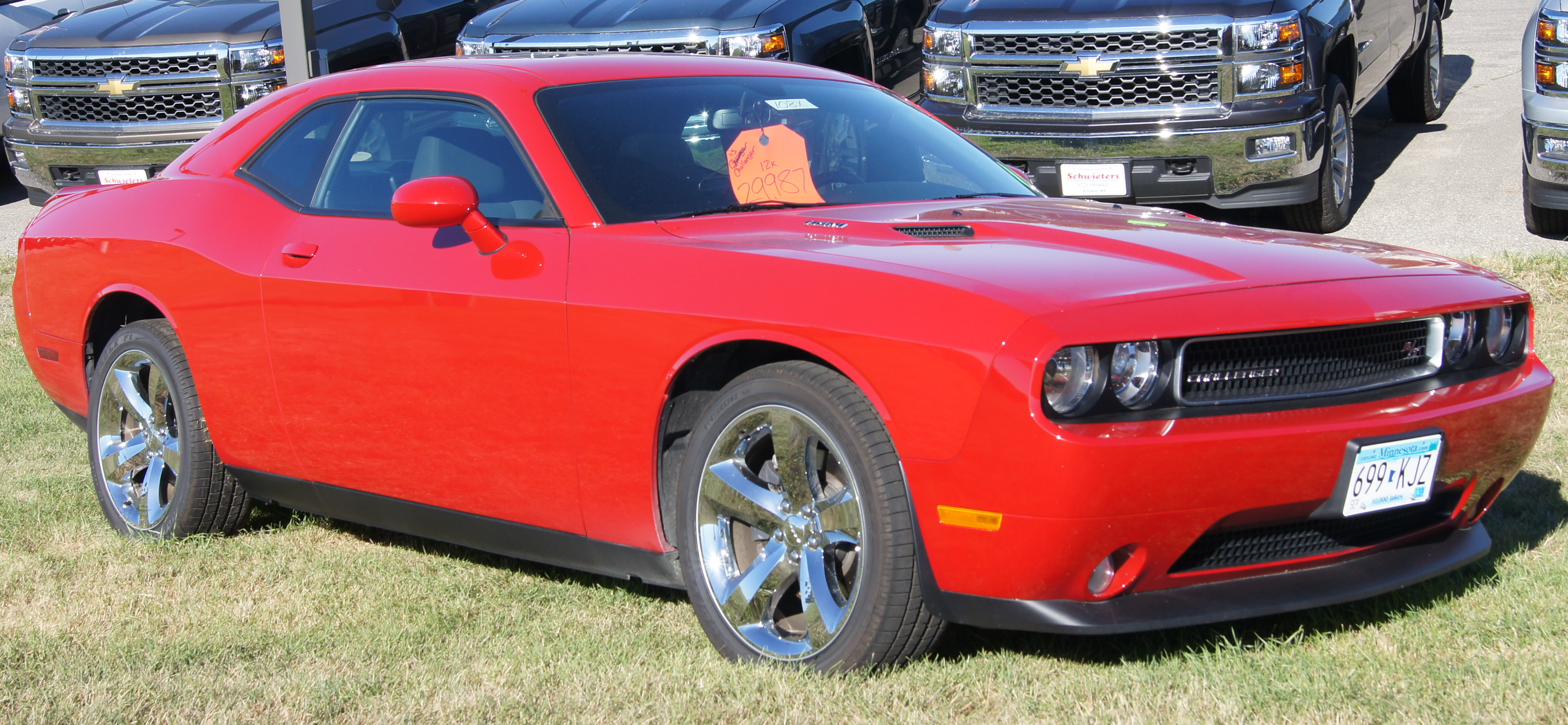
2013 Dodge Challenger R/T

For 2013, a Rallye Redline package was available with Challenger V6 models. Based on the SXT Plus trim, the Rallye Redline package includes unique exterior accents, Black chrome 20-inch wheels with Redline Red accents, performance suspension and brakes, a 3.06 rear-axle ratio, and available Radar Red Nappa leather interior.

The Electronic Vehicle Tracking System (EVTS), a GPS-enabled stolen vehicle recovery system became available.

=== 2014 model year ===
The Challenger largely soldiered on with minimal changes for 2014. A new performance package called the "Super Sport Group" was made available for V6 Challengers and included the performance-suspension, steering, and brakes from the R/T Challengers, a 3.07:1 axle ratio with 215mm rear axle for faster acceleration, rear spoiler, and 20-inch chrome wheels with wider P245/45R20 all-season performance tires. The "Sinister Super Sport pack" was a Super Sport Group but with black wheels instead of chrome. The Challenger SRT8 also gained a launch control system.

==== Dodge Challenger 100th Anniversary Edition ====
The 100th Anniversary Edition is a version of 2014 Dodge Challenger SXT Plus with a Pentastar V6 engine or R/T Plus with a Hemi V8 engine, commemorating the 100th anniversary of brothers Horace Elgin Dodge and John Francis Dodge introducing the Dodge Model 30. It featured a choice of 8 body colors (Pitch Black, Bright White, Billet Silver, Granite Crystal, Ivory Tri-Coat, Phantom Black Tri-Coat, Header Orange and an exclusive High Octane Red pearl), 20x8-inch polished five-spoke aluminum wheels with Granite Crystal pockets, "Dodge Est. 1914" bar-style front-fender badges, Dodge "100" logo on the center caps, a body-color rear spoiler, a red "R/T" heritage grille badge on R/T Plus model, sport seats with all-new Molten Red or Foundry Black Nappa leather upholstery, a custom cloud overprint on the sport seats, center console armrest and door armrests; a unique three-spoke flat-bottom performance steering wheel with die-cast paddle shifters, brass-colored accent stitching on leather-wrapped surfaces, Dark Brushed Graphite center console bezels, Liquid Graphite steering-wheel accents, die-cast "Dodge Est. 1914" circular badges on front seatbacks, an embroidered anniversary logo on floor mats, all-new instrument panel cluster graphics (unique black-face gauges with white indication, stand-out red "100" mph indication), Electronic Vehicle Information Center and Uconnect touchscreen Radio with unique startup image, sport mode calibration, a performance-tuned suspension, 2 unique key fobs with 100th Anniversary Edition jeweled logo on the backside, a customized owner's kit, and a special commemorative book celebrating 100 years of Dodge heritage.

The 100th Anniversary Edition was unveiled at the 2013 LA Auto Show. The car was set to appear in Dodge showrooms during the first quarter of 2014. The Canadian model was set to appear in Dodge showrooms during the first quarter of 2014.

=== 2015 model year (facelift) ===
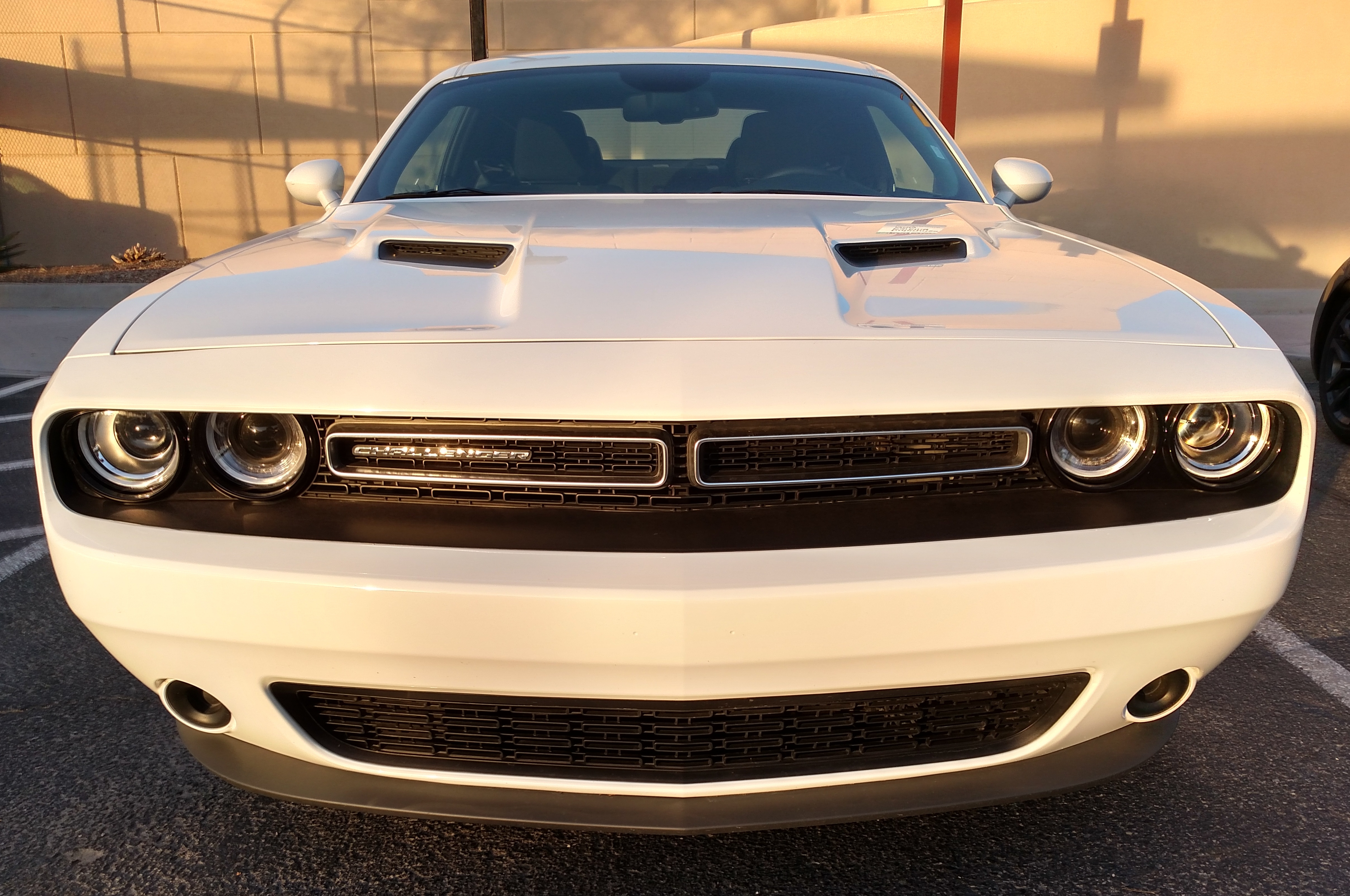
2015 Challenger SXT

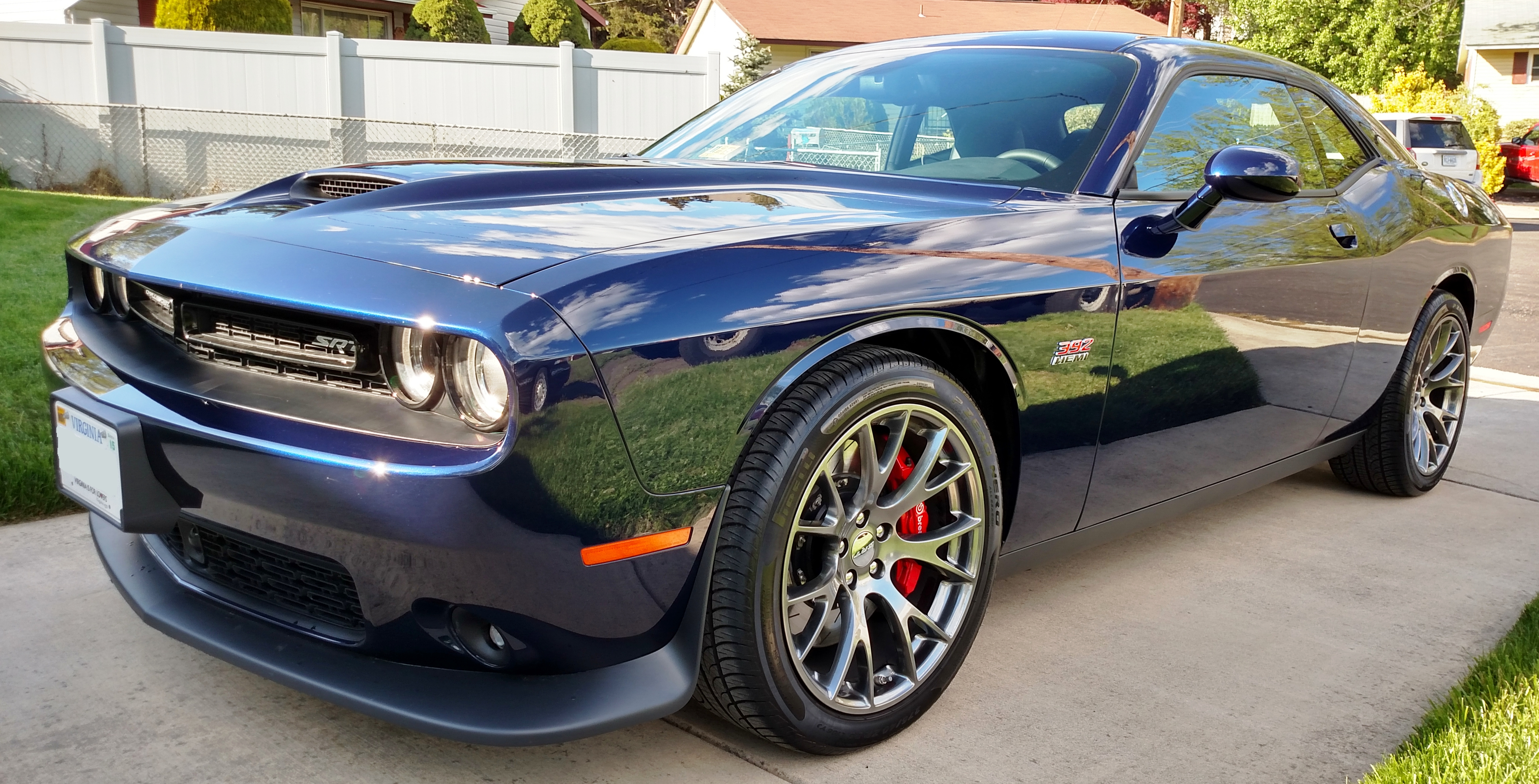
2015 Challenger SRT 392

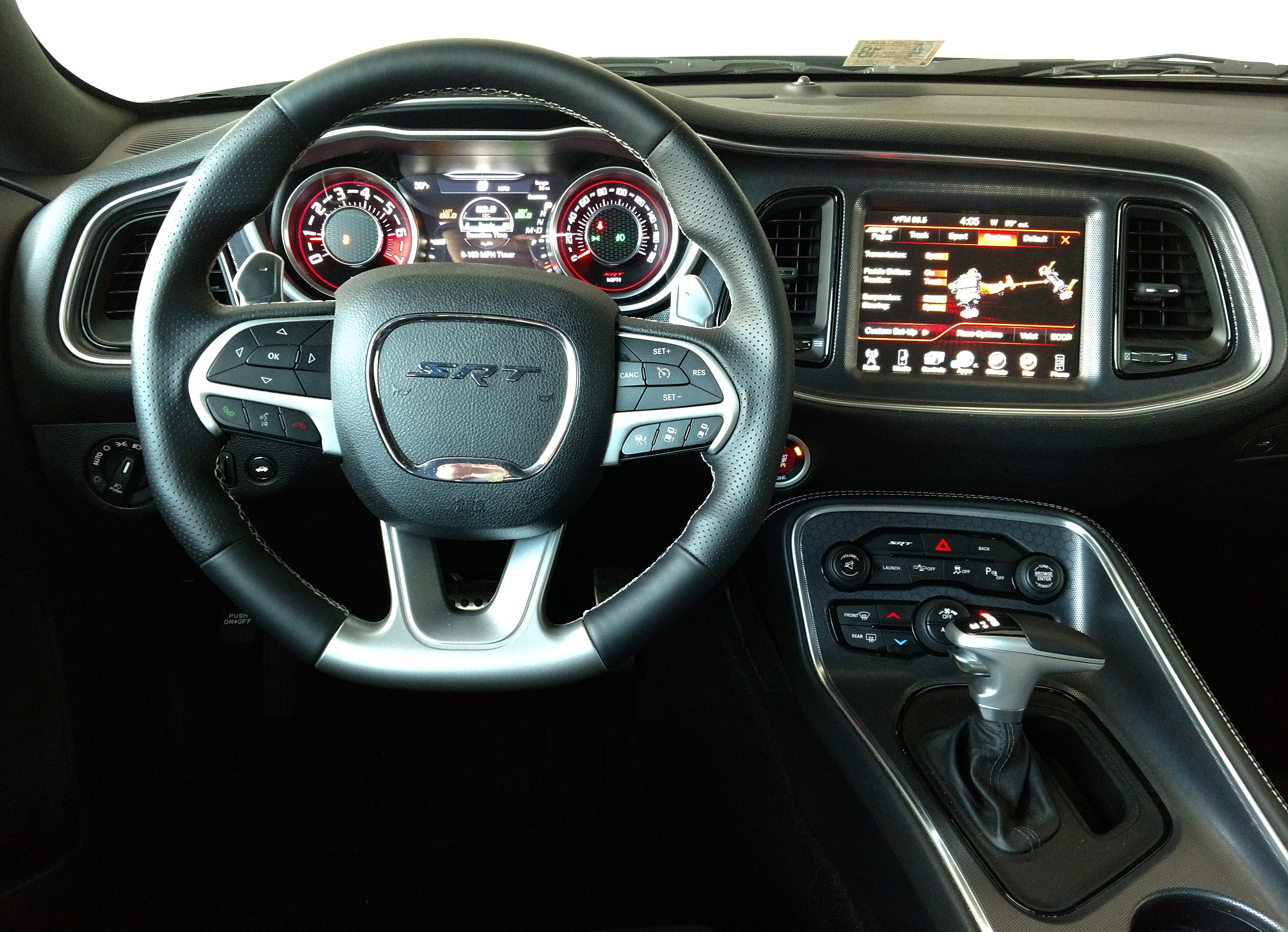
2015 Challenger interior

For the 2015 model year, changes include:

- The high-performance "SRT8" trim was retired, replaced by SRT 392 and SRT Hellcat.
- 5-speed automatic transmission replaced by a new 8-speed ZF 8HP automatic transmission
- Power output on the 6.4-liter Apache V8 increased by 15 hp (11 kW; 15 PS) and 5 lb⋅ft (7 N⋅m; 1 kg⋅m) for a total of 485 hp (362 kW; 492 PS) and 475 lb⋅ft (644 N⋅m; 66 kg⋅m)
- A slightly revamped exterior features a new grille with design cues from the 1971 Challenger, Quad LED 'Halo Ring" headlights, LED taillights, and functional hood intakes on all models.
- Inside, the Challenger gets a 7-inch (180 mm) TFT (thin film transistor) display with over one hundred possible configurations, 8.4-inch Uconnect touchscreen radio with available navigation, and a retro-styled gauge cluster.
- 6-piston front Brembo brakes with two-piece 15.4-inch vented/slotted rotors and 4-piston rear Brembo brakes on SRT 392 and SRT Hellcat models.

==== SRT Hellcat ====
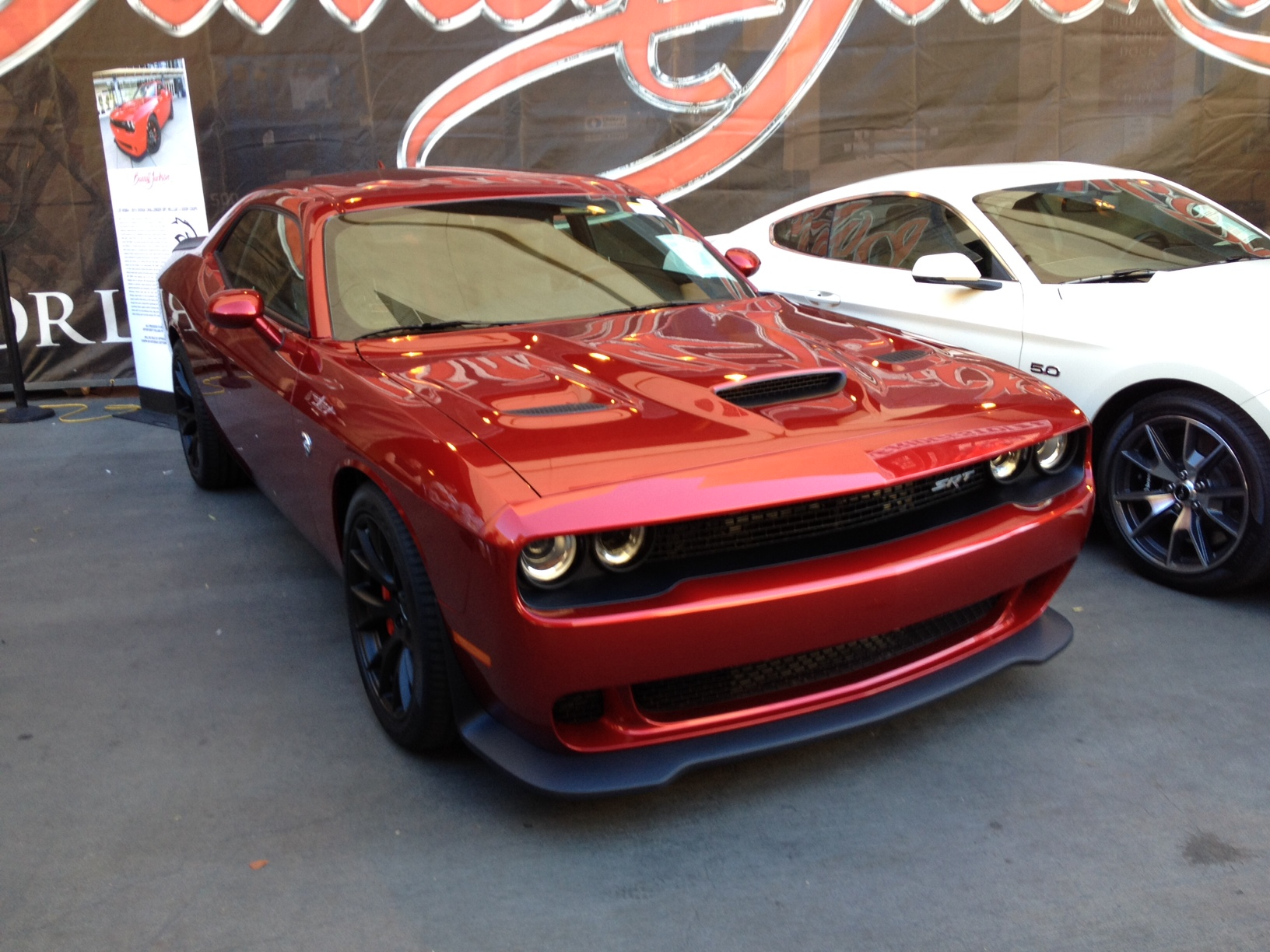
2015 Challenger SRT Hellcat in custom Stryker Red (VIN# 0001)

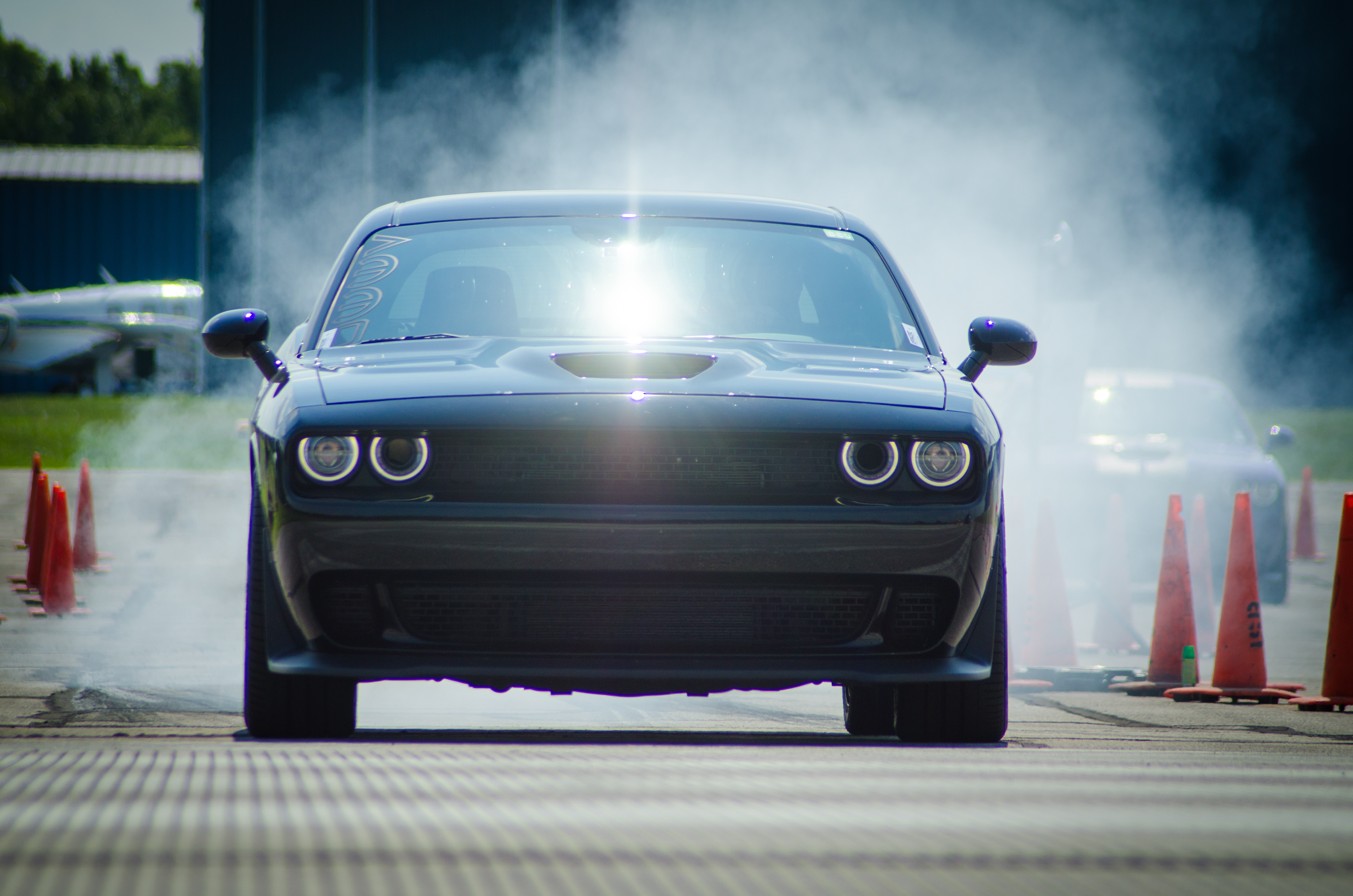
Challenger SRT Hellcat on a dragstrip

Hellcat startup sound

The Dodge Challenger SRT Hellcat is a high performance variant of the Challenger equipped with a supercharged 6.2-liter Hemi engine rated at 707 hp (527 kW) and 650 lb⋅ft (881 N⋅m; 90 kg⋅m) of torque. This engine is also available in cars such as the Dodge Charger SRT Hellcat full-sized sedan and the Jeep Grand Cherokee SRT Trackhawk SUV, as well as the Hellcrate engine swap kit. The inner driving light on the left front has been removed to allow air to get into the engine resulting in more torque, and the wheel wells are different from the standard SRT to accommodate the 20-inch aluminum wheels.

The SRT Hellcat is equipped with two separate key fobs; use of the "black" fob limits engine output to 500 hp (373 kW), while the "red" fob enables full output capability. The Hellcat has a quarter-mile time of 11.2 seconds; this was accomplished with street legal drag tires. On stock tires the Hellcat was able to achieve 11.6 seconds at 125 mph (201 km/h) on the quarter-mile.

The Challenger SRT Hellcat can accelerate from 0–60 mph (0–97 km/h) in 3.6 seconds and can brake from 60–0 mph (97–0 km/h) in 109 ft (36 yd; 33 m). Top speed is 199 mph (320 km/h). The Challenger Hellcat has a lateral acceleration of 0.94 g.

The European-spec Hellcat is capable of accelerating from 0–62 mph (0–100 km/h) in 3.9 seconds, 0–124 mph (0–200 km/h) in 10.7 seconds, and 0–186 mph (0–299 km/h) in 38 seconds (although the speedometer appeared to be inaccurate by 10–15 km/h (6–9 mph)).

The Challenger Hellcat was able to complete its Gingerman Raceway lap in 1:45.8, the Hockenheim Short in 1:14.6 and the Motown Mile in 0:56.37.

=== 2016 model year ===
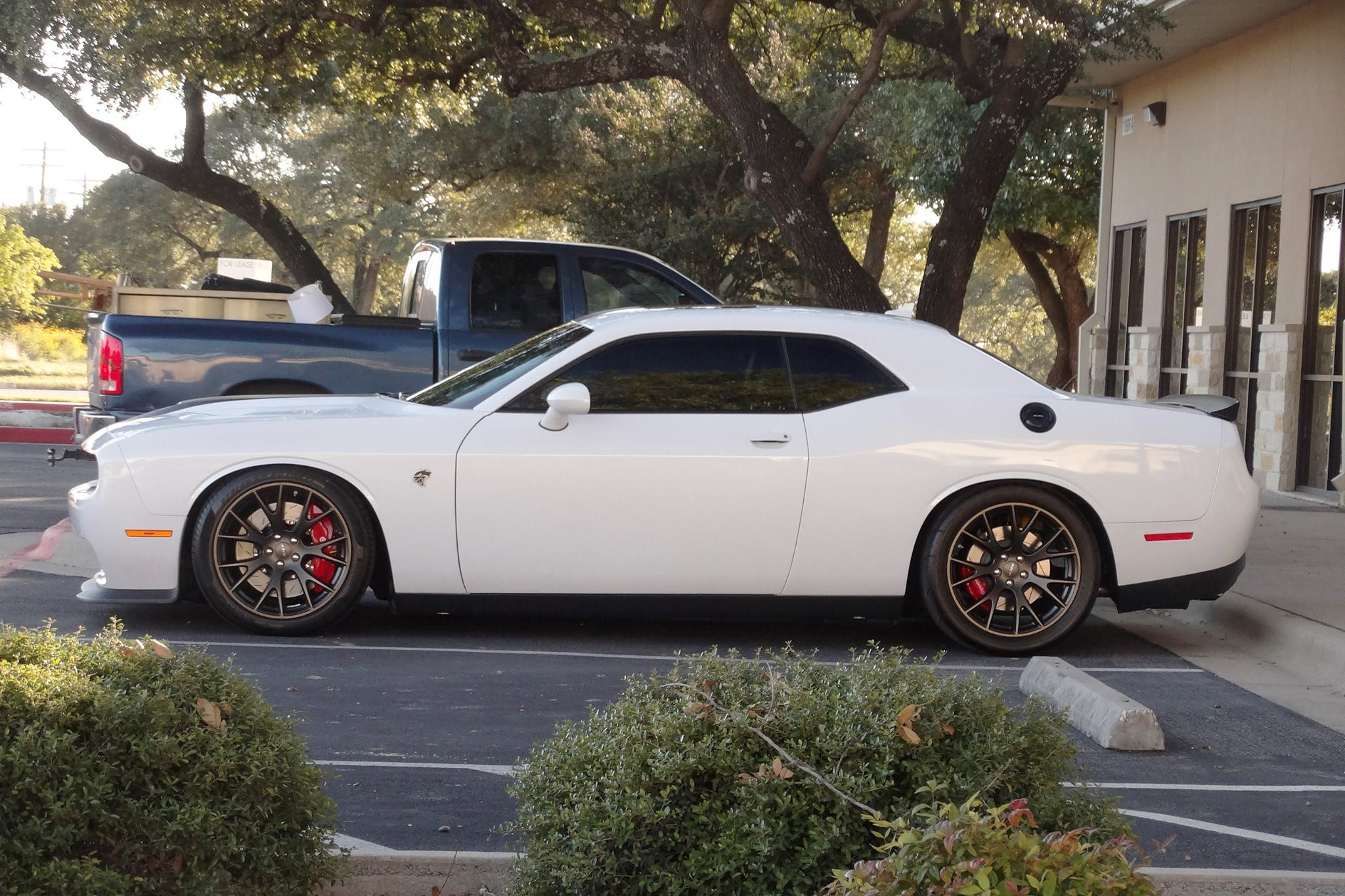
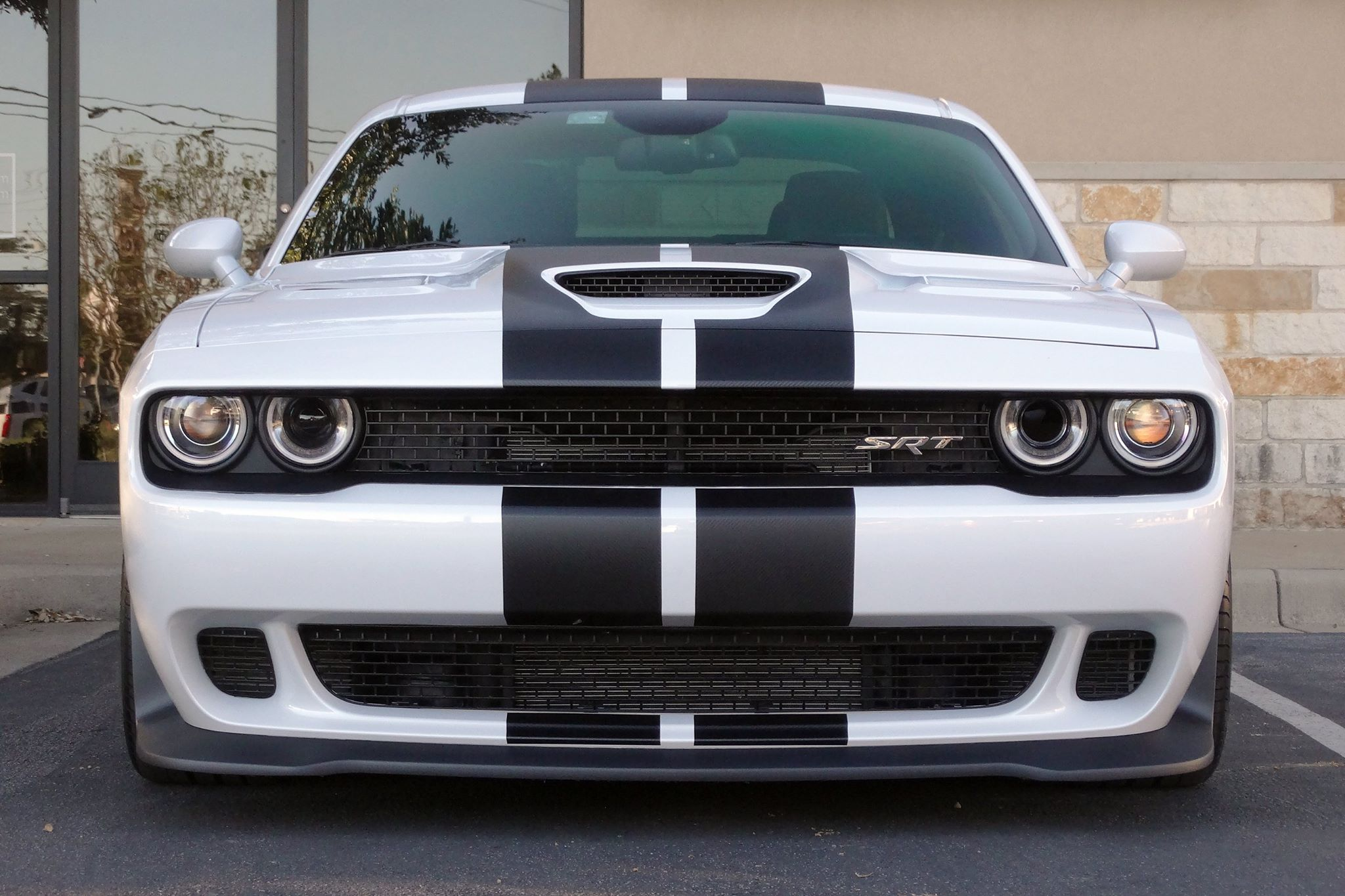
2016 Hellcat (Texas Dealer special edition)

For the 2016 model year, the Challenger received new Go Mango orange and Plum Crazy purple paint colors as well as the Blacktop appearance package.

=== 2017 model year ===
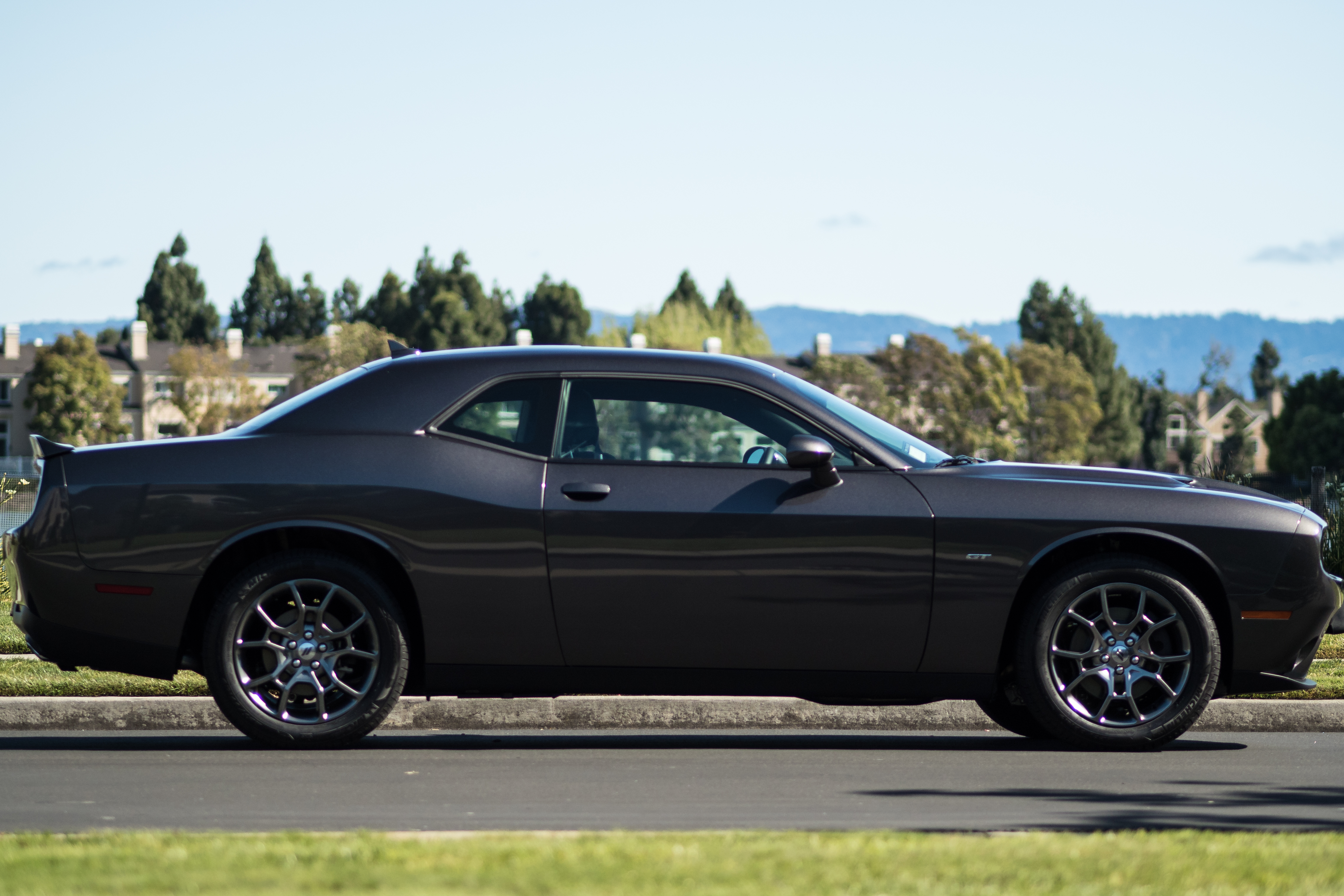
2017 Challenger GT in Graphite Crystal.

For the 2017 model year, a GT model was introduced with an all-wheel drive (AWD) version of the SXT Plus, making the Challenger the only two-door muscle car with available AWD. The Challenger GT uses the same AWD system and suspension as the Dodge Charger Pursuit. It is available exclusively with the 3.6-liter V6 Pentastar engine and the 8-speed automatic transmission.

The AWD system includes both an active transfer case and front-axle disconnect system. The system defaults to rear-wheel drive (RWD) but can seamlessly transition between RWD and AWD if certain conditions are met, like low external temperature, rainfall, or loss of traction. No driver input is required. In Sport Mode, the car uses AWD exclusively. The AWD system in the Challenger GT is configured to be rear-biased (applies more power to the rear wheels). Only up to 38% of power is transferred to the front wheels.

Other model additions include the 5.7-liter V8 equipped T/A and 6.4-liter V8 equipped T/A 392 models. T/A models include a black painted hood with center air intake, black roof, black decklid, bodyside graphics, a cold-air induction system through the front headlamps similar to that used in the Challenger SRT Hellcat, Houndstooth cloth performance seats, and white-faced gauges. T/A 392 models include everything on T/A models in addition to the more powerful 6.4 L V8, six-piston front Brembo brakes with two-piece 15.4-inch vented/slotted rotors and 4-piston rear Brembo brakes, and 20x9.5-inch wheels with 275/40ZR20 tires. Every Challenger gains an updated Uconnect infotainment system; the optional 8.4-inch touchscreen with navigation adds multitouch gestures.

Models equipped with the 5.7-liter V8 now have an electronically controlled low-restriction active exhaust for a more aggressive exhaust note. Among the other additions are standard Houndstooth cloth seats on some models and revised paint choices. Green Go, Yellow Jacket, Destroyer Grey, and Octane Red are new colors, while White Knuckle and Contusion Blue are renamed carryovers.

=== 2018 model year ===
Minor changes were made for the 2018 model year. For SXT and R/T models equipped with the 3.6-liter V6 and 5.7-liter V8, a new Performance Handling Group package is available. This package adds 4-piston black Brembo brakes (a $500 option for red brake calipers is optional) in the front along with a Bilstein performance suspension, 20x9-inch wheels with 245/45ZR20 performance tires, and upgraded steering. The Challenger GT gains a new 19-inch wheel option while SXT Plus and R/T Plus trims equipped with the Super Track package come with Nappa leather and microsuede sport seats. The SXT, R/T, R/T Shaker, and T/A models receive a standard 7.0-inch Uconnect touchscreen. A backup camera is now standard. For exterior colors, new additions include F8 Green, IndiGO Blue, B5 Blue and Plum Crazy.

==== SRT Demon ====
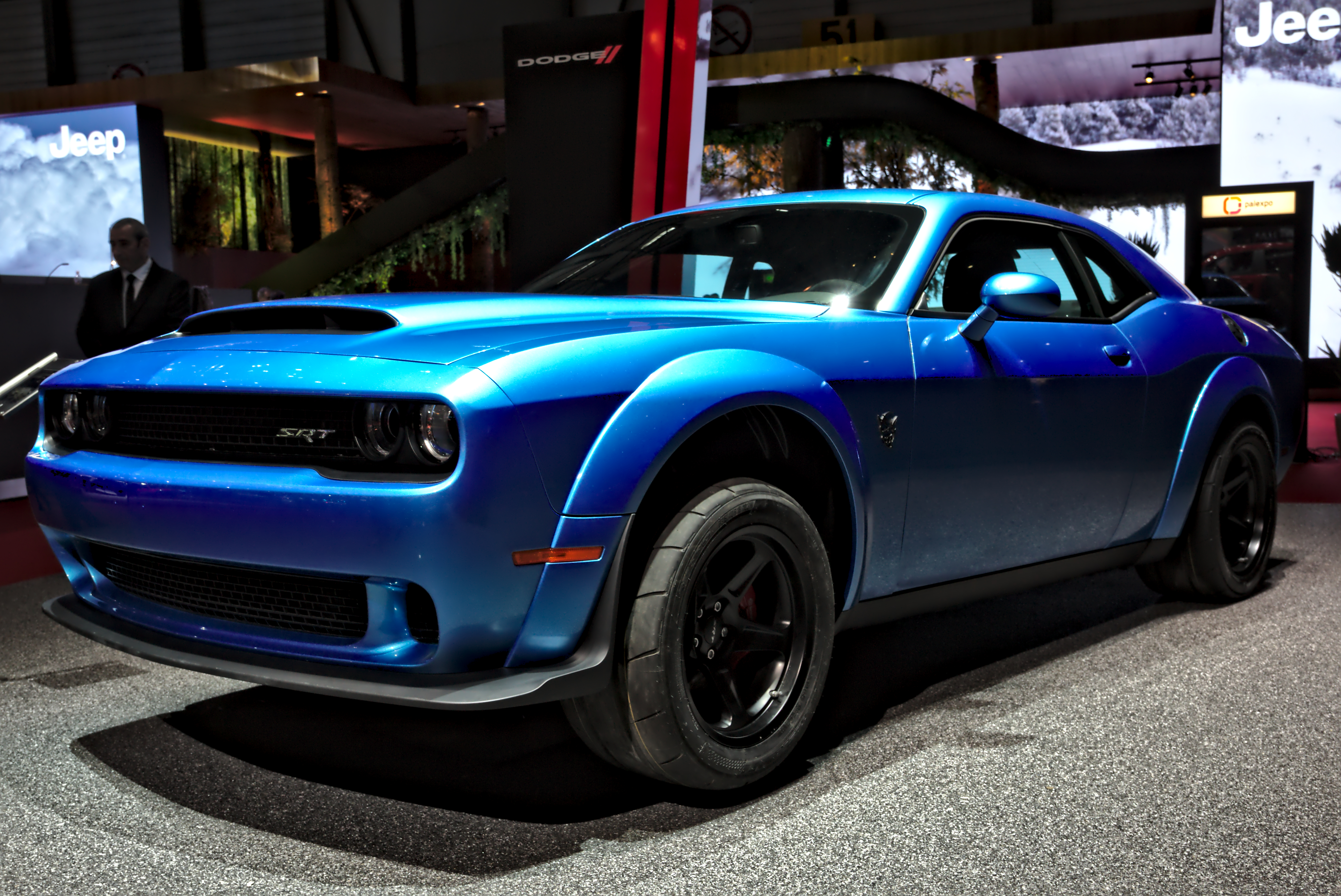
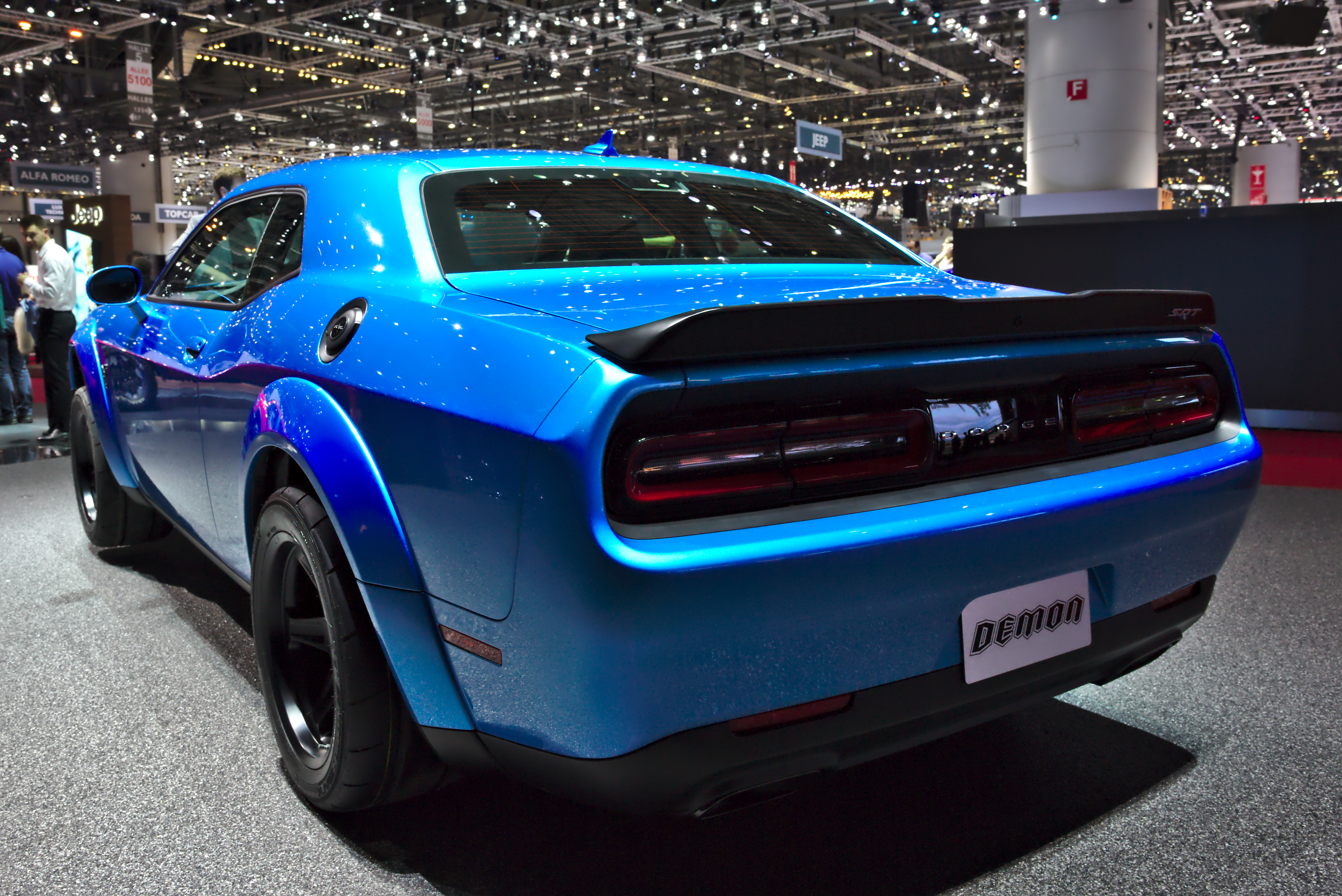
Dodge Challenger Demon at the 2018 Geneva Motor Show

The Demon is a limited production wide-body and extreme (drag race level) performance variant of the already high-performance Challenger SRT Hellcat. It debuted during the New York Auto Show in April 2017.

The Demon uses an all-new 6.2-liter V8 engine equipped with a 2.7-liter supercharger, which is rated at 808 hp (603 kW; 819 PS) with 91 octane gasoline and 840 hp (626 kW; 852 PS) with 100 octane fuel or higher (both outputs are with the red key fob supplied with the car). Torque stands at 770 lb⋅ft (1,044 N⋅m; 106 kg⋅m) on 100 octane fuel. The car weighs 215 lb (98 kg) less than the Hellcat, the total being 4,254 lb (1,930 kg). The SRT Demon uses a set of road tires by Nitto Tire, called the NT05R. The tires are the 315/40R18 variations at both front and rear. The tires are targeted for the drag strip, but have enough tread pattern to make them legal for the road. This tire, although an NT05R consumer tire, is a variation built specifically to withstand the power output of the Demon. This makes the Challenger SRT Demon the first production car to contain a set of drag radial road tires. The SRT Demon contains a system that is used specifically for drag racing called transbrake. Dodge uses a unique transbrake that puts the transmission in first gear and second gear simultaneously, holding the Demon stationary. This is used along with the car's torque converter to build up hydraulic pressure before launch.

The power-to-weight ratio of the SRT Demon is 418 hp (312 kW; 424 PS) per ton on 91 octane gasoline and 435 hp (324 kW; 441 PS) per ton on 100 octane or higher.

The SRT Demon accelerates from 0–30 mph (0–48 km/h) in 1.0 second, 0–60 mph (0–97 km/h) in 2.3 seconds (2.0s with a rollout), 0–100 mph (0–161 km/h) in 5.1 seconds, a top speed of 168 mph (270 km/h) (factory limited), and the quarter mile (400 m (1,300 ft; 440 yd)) in only 9.65 seconds at 140.09 mph (225.45 km/h). This makes the Demon the fastest non-electric production car to reach 0-60 mph (0–97 km/h) and to complete a straight-line quarter mile at its time of announcement. The SRT Demon is also capable of accelerating at 1.8 G's of force at launch. The boost pressure of the supercharger can be increased to 14.5 psi (100 kPa; 1.00 bar) and redline up to 6,500 rpm. With this extreme power, and hard acceleration, the SRT Demon is the first production car to perform a wheelie. With the control module from the "Demon Crate" and high-speed tires, the Demon has attained a top speed of over 200 mph (320 km/h) in test runs.

Because of the lack of an NHRA certified roll cage, which is required if the quarter-mile time is under 10 seconds, the NHRA banned the SRT Demon from competition.

Like the SRT Hellcat, it comes with both red and black key fobs, with the black fob limiting the power output to 500 hp (373 kW). With the red key and the use of 100+ octane gasoline, the Demon can utilize its full power potential. Only 3,300 cars were made, with production beginning in the summer of 2017 and market introduction happening in the fall of 2017.

The interior of the SRT Demon is the same as all other Challenger trims, but with changes that differentiate it to the other trims. The Demon only includes a front driver's seat as standard, and no other seats front or rear in the vehicle. However, the front passenger's seat, as well as a rear bench seat, can both be added back as options for one dollar each. To replace the rear seats, Dodge included rear roll bars, and has a 4-point harness installed on it for the driver seat. The dashboard display and the seats now have the Demon logo on them, and includes a performance display on it, as well as on the center console touch screen.

Dodge engineers reduced the curb weight of the 2018 Challenger SRT Demon to 4,237 lb (1,922 kg) versus the 4,469 lb (2,027 kg) curb weight of the SRT Hellcat, a difference of 105 kg (231 lb). Weight reduction was achieved by removing the front passenger seat (it could be added back), rear seat, speakers, trunk trim, parking sensors, and insulators, among other items. The SRT Demon also uses lightweight aluminum alloy wheels, pistons, calipers, and brake rotors.

The SRT Demon was chosen as one of the Top 10 Tech Cars by the IEEE in 2018.

===== Specifications =====
Specifications of the Challenger SRT Demon are as follows:

- 6.2-liter supercharged Hemi V8 engine, includes 2.7-liter supercharger (840 hp (626 kW; 852 PS) and 770 lb⋅ft (1,044 N⋅m; 106 kg⋅m) using 100 octane racing fuel or higher, or 808 hp (603 kW; 819 PS) and 717 lb⋅ft (972 N⋅m; 99 kg⋅m) using 91 octane premium fuel
- 8-speed ZF 8HP automatic transmission as standard, with steering wheel mounted shift paddles
- Runs on 91 octane premium fuel or 100 octane racing fuel
- 1.8 g (17.7 m·s^{−2}) of longitudinal g-force at launch
- Total curb weight of 1,930 kg (4,255 lb) (98 kg (215 lb) less than SRT Hellcat)
- Air conditioning
- Uconnect 8.4 in (21 cm) touchscreen audio system (with SRT performance pages)
- Front and rear fender flares (adds 3.5 in (9 cm) to overall width of car)
- Alcantara-wrapped steering wheel (with shift paddles mounted on it)
- Stitched or embossed Demon emblems on front seatbacks
- 200 mph (322 km/h) speedometer (with Demon-themed TFT reconfigurable instrument cluster)
- Factory-installed transbrake System
- 18 in (46 cm) street-legal, Drag Radial Tires
- Factory-installed SRT "Power-Chiller" (a system that uses the vehicle's air conditioning to pre-cool the intercooler before the run and thus further compress air from the supercharger)
- Front passenger and rear bench seat delete with rear roll bar (items can be re-added for a dollar each)
- Functional hood scoop (largest hood scoop in any production car)
- 2-speaker audio system (Harman Kardon audio system is optional)

The last SRT Demon rolled off the assembly line in Brampton, Ontario, Canada on May 31, 2018. It was sold at a Barrett-Jackson auction in June 2018 alongside the final Dodge Viper.

=== 2019 model year ===
For the 2019 model year, Dodge released new high-performance versions of the Challenger, trimmed the line-up down to six models, and made numerous other tweaks and changes. The model line-up for 2019 includes the following trims: SXT, GT, R/T, R/T Scat Pack, SRT Hellcat, and SRT Hellcat Redeye. Both SXT and GT models are now available in both rear and all-wheel drive, with the GT previously having been the only model available in AWD. GTs gain a more aggressive look with a performance hood, front splitter, steering and suspension while maintaining the optional performance handling group which includes wider wheels, performance summer tires, 4-piston Brembo brakes, and fixed-rate Bilstein suspension. The SXT model loses the performance handling group as an option, lacks the more aggressive exterior upgrades of the GT and has less aggressive gearing, making it the cheaper economical alternative. R/T Scat Pack models come with a new power-bulge aluminum hood standard. Shared with the SRT Hellcat, this hood features dual air extractors that cool the engine and help reduce lift. For 5.7L and 6.4L V8 R/T models, the rear seats can be deleted at the cost of $1 and have a net weight savings of 55 lbs. In addition, a second level of the performance handling group called the "performance plus package" is offered, providing 20 x 9.5-inch low-gloss black forged wheels, 275/40ZR20 Pirelli P Zero summer tires, and a limited-slip differential in addition to the upgrades found in the performance handling group which remains unchanged since its introduction in 2018.

SRT Hellcat: A slight increase in power is present for 2019, with horsepower rising to 717 horsepower (535 kW; 727 PS) and torque to 656 lb⋅ft (889 N⋅m; 91 kg⋅m). A new dual-snorkel hood is introduced. Additionally, the 2019 model's starting price is more than $5,500 lower compared to the 2018 model. A 6-speed Tremec manual and ZF 8-speed automatic remain the sole transmission options.

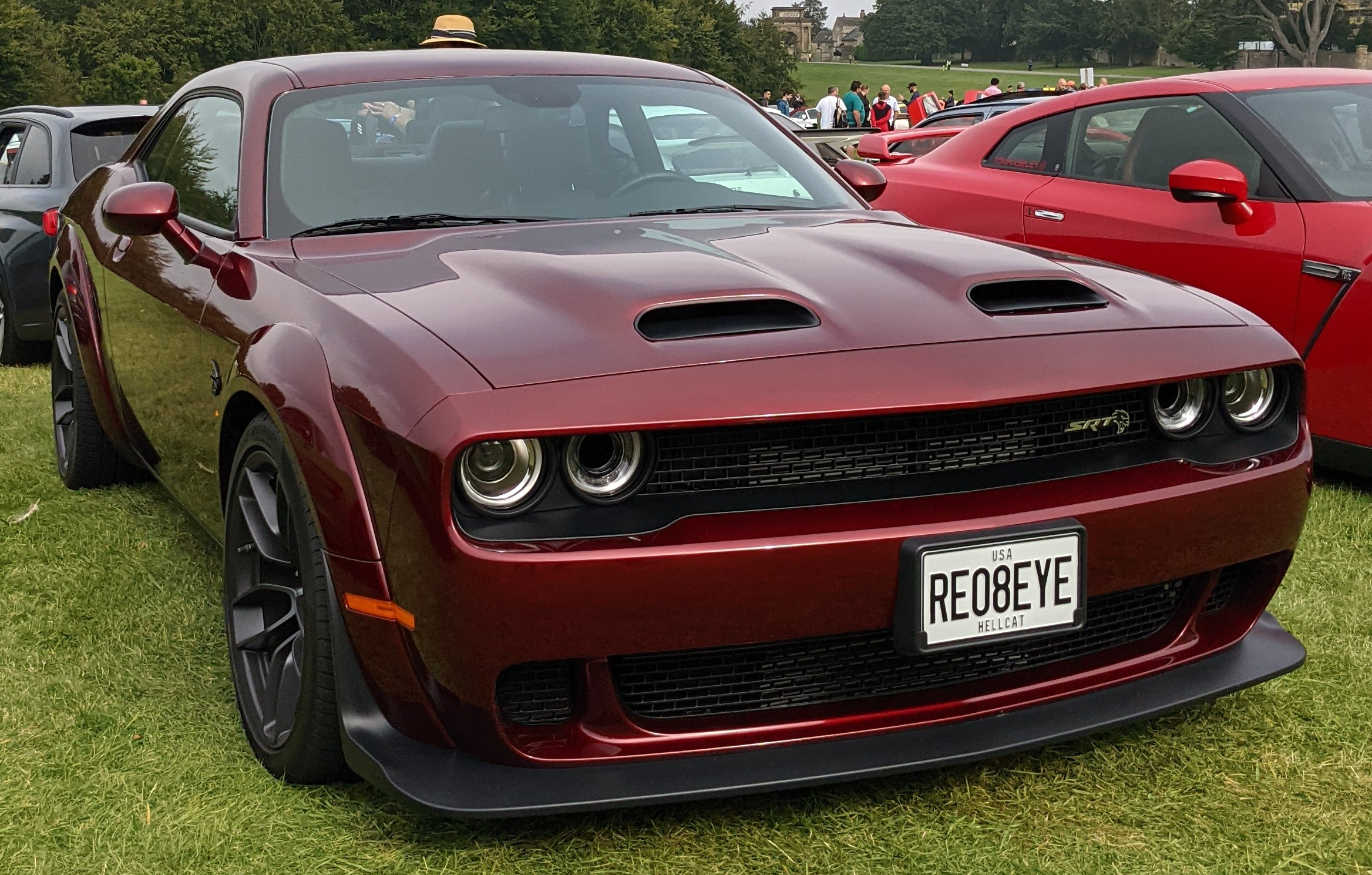
Challenger Hellcat Redeye

SRT Hellcat Redeye: Following the discontinuation of the Demon, the Redeye was developed to fill the void. Essentially a heavily upgraded Hellcat, the Redeye is equipped with a slightly less powerful (due to a smaller hood intake system) Demon engine: a supercharged 6.2L V8 rated at 797 hp (594 kW; 808 PS) and 707 lb⋅ft (959 N⋅m; 98 kg⋅m) of torque, an increase of 90 hp (67 kW; 91 PS) and 11 lb⋅ft (15 N⋅m; 2 kg⋅m) over the standard Hellcat engine. Other upgrades include a reinforced ZF 8 speed automatic transmission, track-tuned suspension, Torque Reserve and 41-spline heavy-duty half-shafts, SRT power chiller, and after-run chiller.

Scat Pack 1320 Package: Equipped with the 6.4L Chrysler Hemi Engine rated at 485 hp (362 kW; 492 PS) and 475 lb⋅ft (644 N⋅m; 66 kg⋅m), the Scat Pack 1320 adds 20 x 9.5-inch low-gloss black drag wheels, 275/40R20 102W drag radial tires, adaptive damping suspension, SRT-tuned drag suspension, air-catcher headlamps, optional deletion of front and rear passenger seats, a special speed limited engine controller, extreme-duty 41-spline half shafts and a trans-brake. Specially developed Nexen 275/40R20l street-legal drag radial tires are available for better grip.

The Dodge Challenger R/T Scat Pack 1320 can be modified for NHRA competition in accordance with Stock and Super Stock class rules. It will feature a class weight break of 8.72 and carry a minimum weight of 3,400 pounds. Contestants intending to compete at an NHRA event must meet all regulations for the category entered.

Widebody Package: For the 2019 model year, buyers can order the Challenger Scat Pack, SRT Hellcat, and SRT Hellcat Redeye with the "Widebody Package". When purchased, the Challenger gains the following:

- Widebody fender flares
- 20x11-inch Devils Rim forged aluminum wheels
- 305/35ZR20 Pirelli 3-season performance (P Zero Nero all-season) tires
- 3-mode Bilstein adaptive damping suspension uniquely tuned for competition use
- 6-piston calipers with 15.4-inch vented and slotted rotors in the front (standard on Hellcat and Hellcat Redeye models)
- Stiffened anti-roll bars sized 34mm in front and 22mm rear (standard on Hellcat and Hellcat Redeye models)

=== 2020 model year ===
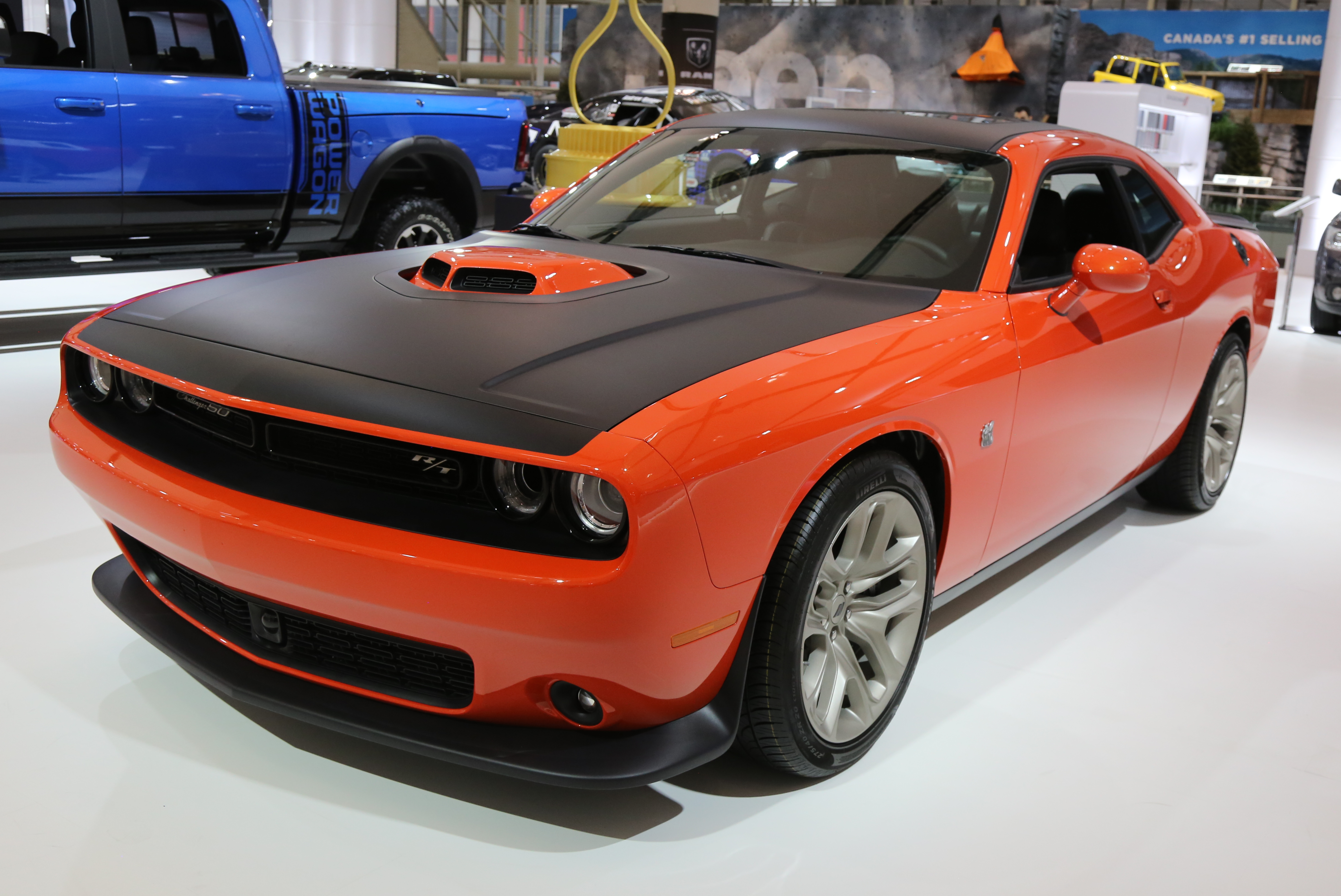
2020 Challenger R/T 50th Anniversary Edition at the 2020 Canadian International Autoshow

For the 2020 model year, Dodge introduced a SRT Super Stock model slotting in between the Hellcat Redeye and the Demon. The engine is the same as the Redeye, but is slightly more powerful at 807 hp (602 kW; 818 PS). This is enabled by a revision of the powertrain calibration, which increases the redline from 6300 to 6400 rpm. Additionally, the Super Stock gains lightweight 18-inch wheels with the same drag radials as the Demon, along with a shorter final-drive ratio and drag-optimized suspension tuning for the Bilstein adaptive dampers in Track Mode. However, it uses four-piston Brembo and 14.2-inch rotors instead of the Redeye's six-piston Brembo and 15.4-inch rotors. A 50th Anniversary Package was also announced for GT RWD, R/T Shaker, R/T Scat Pack, and R/T Scat Pack Shaker Widebody models, as well as the SRT Hellcat and SRT Hellcat Redeye. The package includes a body paint matched Shaker hood scoop, Gold School 20-inch wheels and matching 6-piston Brembo brake calipers on wide body models, and a special grille badge, with Nappa leather and Alcantara upholstery featuring gold sepia stitching, a serialized number 1/70 (one of seventy made) plaque, and carbon-fiber trim inside. Each model was limited to 70 units; colors include Frostbite, Hellraisin, Sinamon Stick, TorRed, F8 Green, Go Mango, and an exclusive Gold Rush.

=== 2021 model year ===
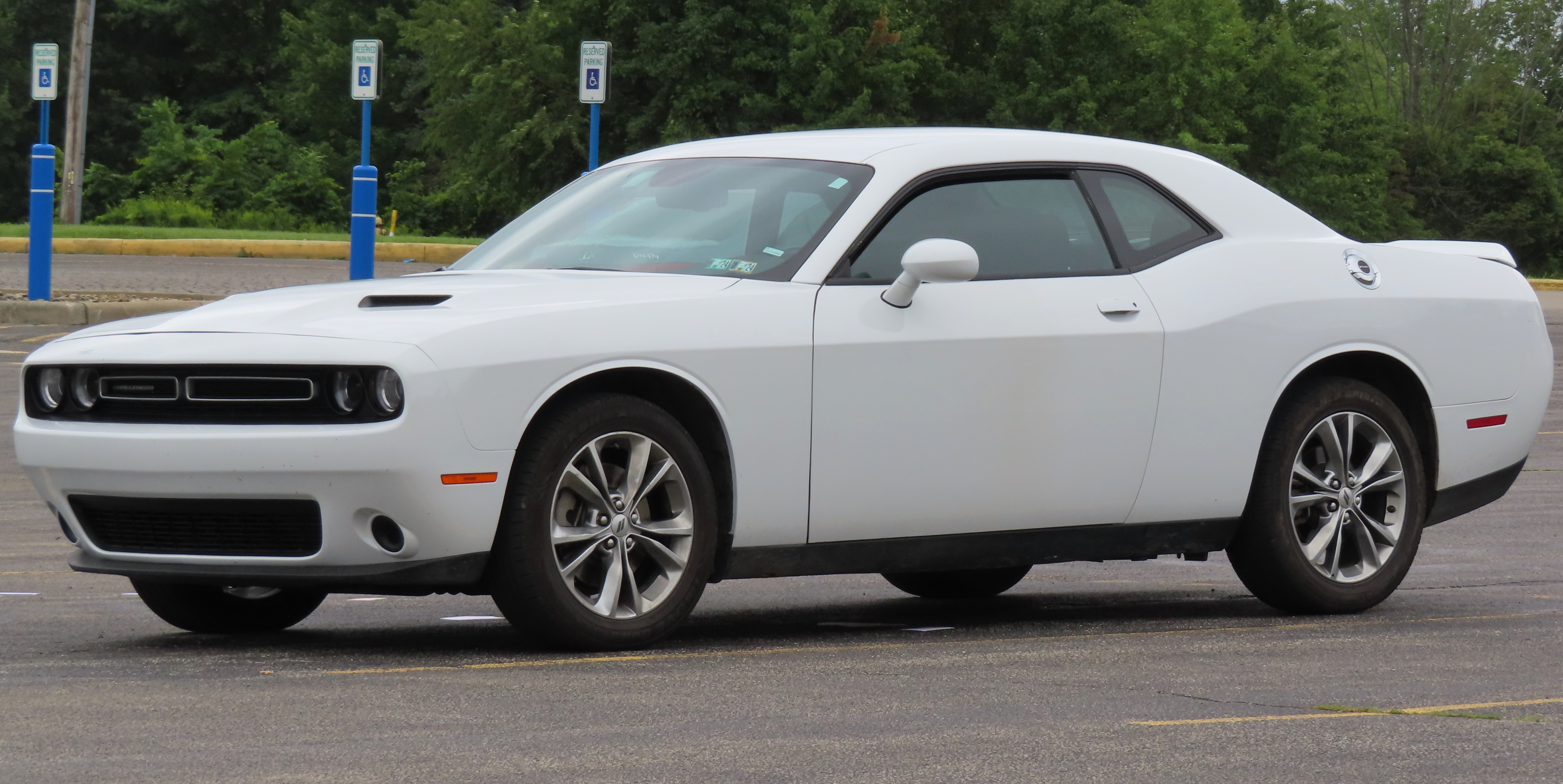
2021 Dodge Challenger SXT AWD

For the 2021 model year, Dodge added Gold Rush on the T/A, T/A 392, SRT Hellcat, and SRT Hellcat Redeye models. R/T Scat Pack Shaker and T/A 392 models gain a wide-body option, while 20-inch wheels and tires are now standard on the GT AWD model. The Hellcat model is only available in the ZF 8-speed automatic transmission, as the 6-speed Tremec has been removed as an option for the Hellcat pending revised calibrations by Dodge. The manual transmission will continue to be available for the R/T, and R/T Scat Pack.

=== 2022 model year ===
For the 2022 model year, Dodge added the Jailbreak package for the SRT Hellcat Redeye Widebody, which allows customers to ignore traditional ordering restrictions and choose any combination of colors and trim finishes.

=== 2023 model year ===
For its final model year, Dodge returned the 6-speed Tremec manual transmission to the Hellcat, making it the standard gearbox. The Jailbreak package also became available for all SRT Challenger models.

==== SRT Demon 170 ====
Unveiled on March 20, 2023, the Dodge Challenger SRT Demon 170 produces 1,025 hp (764 kW; 1,039 PS) and 945 lb⋅ft (1,281 N⋅m; 131 kg⋅m), and has the highest launch force of any production car, with G-forces at 2.004 G's. With prices starting at $96,666 / £79,000 before the destination tax. Dodge plans to build 3,000 units for the US market and 300 for Canada, with orders opening on March 27. As of 2023, it is the fastest accelerating production car in the world, with a claimed 0-60 mph time of 1.66 seconds. It covers a quarter mile in 8.91 seconds, receiving a ban from the NHRA for setting a sub-nine second quarter mile without a roll cage or parachute. A Pitch-Black painted Demon 170 became the final Challenger ever produced on December 22, 2023.

=== Limited production third party variants ===
In addition to official Dodge concept cars, there have been numerous limited production and street legal variants created by third parties, based on stock cars that have been rebuilt with modified powertrains, suspensions, and interiors. These include the SMS 570 and (supercharged) 570X with up to a claimed 700 hp (522 kW), the Mr. Norm's Challengers with a claimed 637 or 900 hp (475 or 671 kW; 646 or 912 PS) horsepower, the supercharged SpeedFactory SF600R with around 600 hp (447 kW; 608 PS), the supercharged Richard Petty Signature Series with a claimed 610 bhp (455 kW; 618 PS), and the Legacy by Petty Convertible Challenger completely customized by Petty's Garage to include a one of a kind front end and NASCAR styled treatments. Some Challengers have been imported into Australia and converted to right-hand-drive.

=== Dodge Challenger Convertible ===
Starting August 16, 2022, the Challenger Convertible could be ordered at official Dodge dealers. Customers will then work with Drop Top Customs, the conversion firm, and the Dodge dealer to create their vehicle. The convertible option is open for 2022 Challenger R/T, R/T Scat Pack and all Challenger SRT models.

=== Safety ===
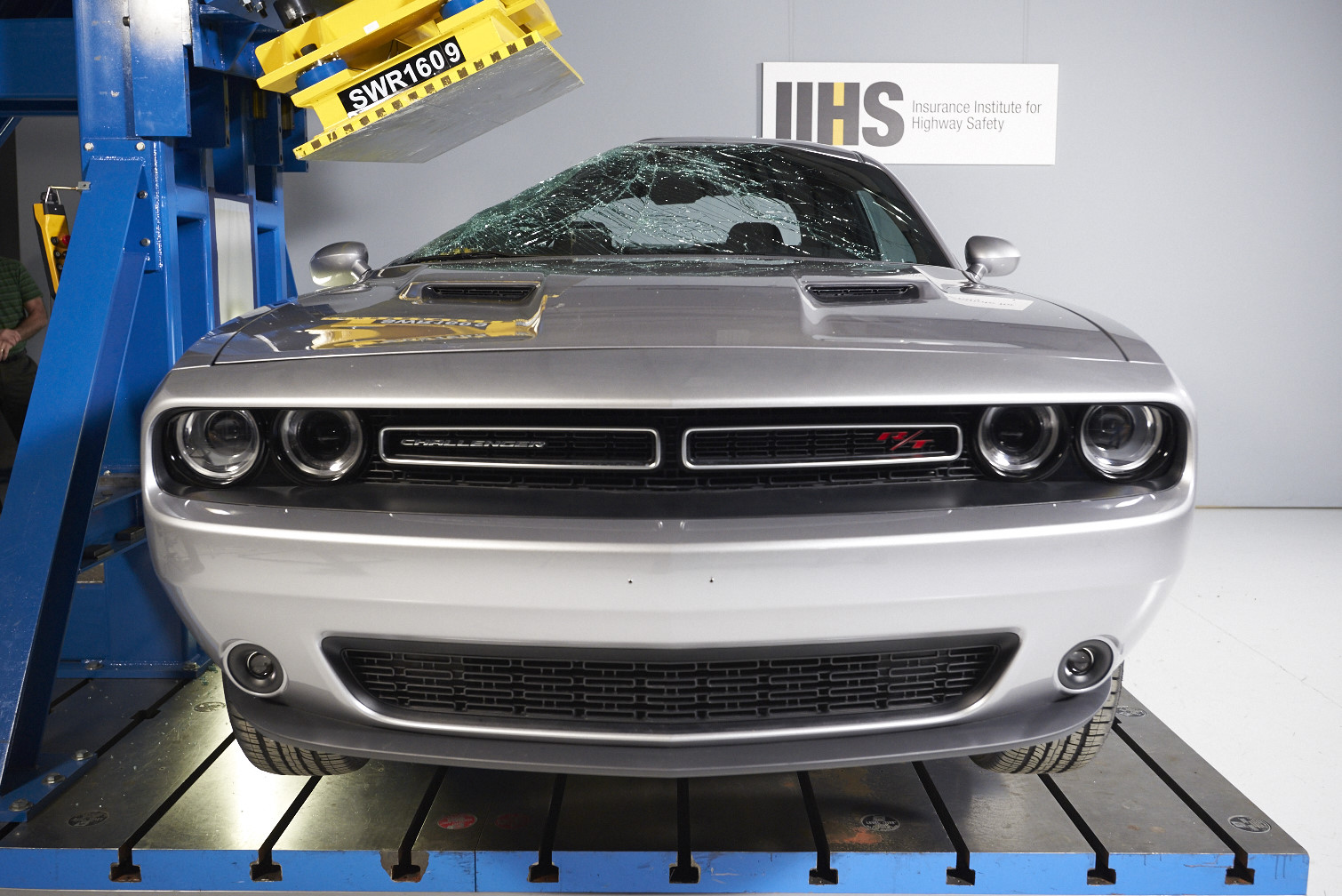
IIHS roof strength test on a 2016 Dodge Challenger R/T

IIHS 2019 Dodge Challenger
Small overlap–driver	Marginal
Moderate overlap	Good
Side	Good
Roof strength	Acceptable
Head restraints and seats	Acceptable
Front crash prevention (automated avoidance)	Basic
LATCH (ease of use)	Acceptable

NHTSA 2019 Dodge Challenger
Overall:	5/5 stars
Frontal Driver Side:	4/5 stars
Frontal Passenger Side:	5/5 stars
Front Seat:	5/5 stars
Rear Seat:	5/5 stars
Driver:	5/5 stars
Rear Passenger:	5/5 stars
Rollover (11.1%):	4/5 stars

=== Sales ===
Calendar year	United States	Canada	Mexico	Europe
2008	17,423		284	
2009	25,852		305	
2010	36,791		179	101
2011	39,534		197	108
2012	46,788	1,485	295	153
2013	51,462	1,514	491	106
2014	51,611	1,623	625	241
2015	66,365	2,669	659	310
2016	64,478	3,160	668	263
2017	64,537	3,422	463	358
2018	66,716	2,274	443	706
2019	60,997	2,341	392	631
2020	52,955	1,368	261	
2021	54,314	1,563	255	351
2022	55,060	1,853		440
2023	44,960	2,602		
2024	27,056	1,409		
Subtotal	772,584	25,870	4,603	3,868
Total	806,925			

== Racing ==
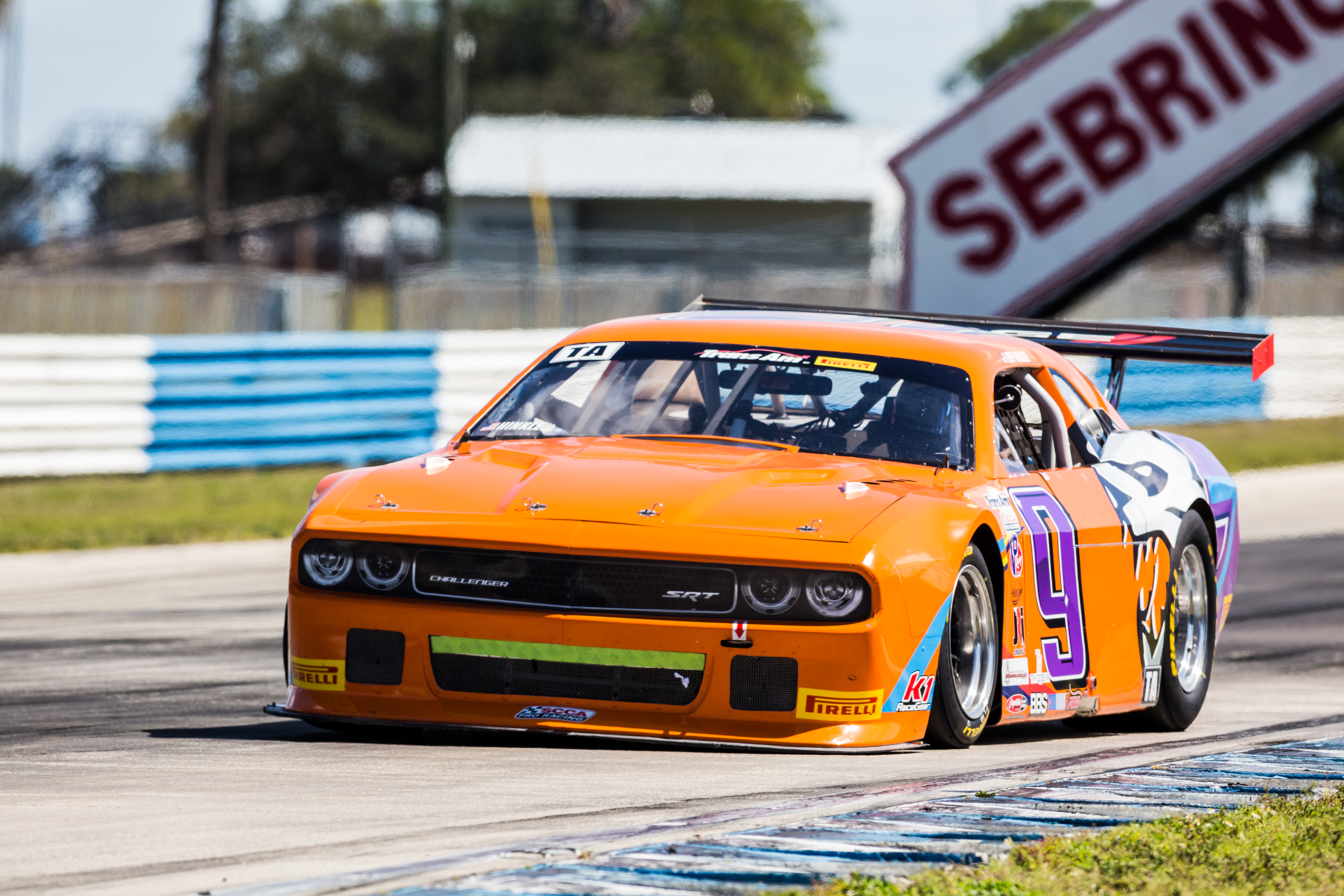
2017 Trans Am TA class Challenger at Sebring

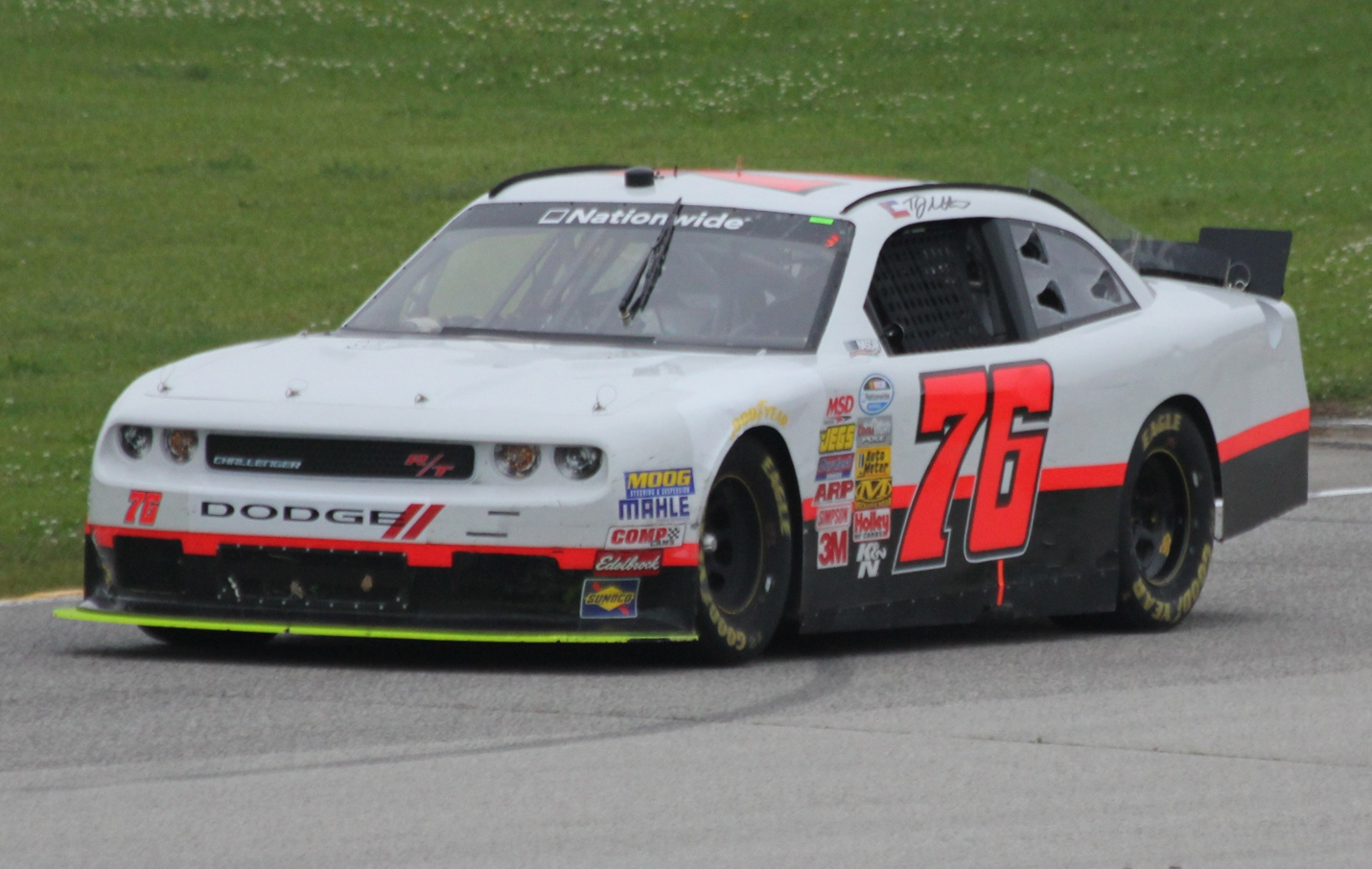
NASCAR Nationwide Series Challenger at Road America in 2014

Blackforest Motorsports has currently entered a Challenger in the Continental Challenge.

The Challenger R/T has been used as the Chrysler model for starting in 2010 NASCAR Nationwide Series competition.

With Dodge officially out of NASCAR at the end of the 2012 season, the remaining cars and racing parts have been bought up by "privateer" racing teams and continue to show up in Nationwide Series during the 2013 and 2014 seasons. J. J. Yeley indicated his two-car team would continue to field a Challenger in the series for as long as he can find parts to keep the cars running. The team stopped after the 2014 season after his No. 93 (later No. 28) regularly ran in the top-20 during races, though the Mike Harmon-owned No. 74 and the Derek White-operated No. 40 qualified and ran Dodges in 2015. Mike Harmon Racing ran a Dodge the entire season and also did so in 2016, and has raced in over half of the 2017 season so far. Likewise, White's MBM Motorsports team fielded the Nos. 13 and 40 as Dodges in some races. MBM continues to field Dodges into 2018 with Timmy Hill in the 66 (was the 13).

In late 2014 two Challengers fielded by Miller Racing with the support of SRT and Mopar driven by Cameron Lawrence and Joe Stevens started racing in the Trans-Am Series's TA2 class. Both cars used a spec Howe road racing tube chassis with fiberglass bodies. Powered by a Hemi 392 slightly modified for road racing extremes and restricted by class rules, the cars made around 500 horsepower. Except for slightly bulged fenders and large rear wing, the cars look very much like the stock/street version, despite being roughly 7/8s the size of the road car. Lawrence won four of 12 races in the 2015 season, finishing third overall in the Trans Am TA2 championship. Joe Stevens in the No. 11 "Green Car" finished sixth overall after a fourth place at the season finale at Daytona International Speedway. Joe Stevens also received the Cool Shirt Hard Charger award for his excellent rookie season performance. For the 2016 season, the Stevens-Miller Team fielded three Challengers in the TA2 series and ran in 16 events, scoring a few wins. The No. 77 car was painted in a throw-back paint scheme very similar to the 1970 No. 77 car driven by Sam Posey. The No. 12 car occasionally fielded a blue scheme paying tribute to the Plymouth Cuda Trans-Am car driven by Swede Savage.

In March 2017 the Challenger returned to the TA class in Trans-Am at Sebring after a nearly 40-year absence from Trans-Am's fastest class of racing. It was driven by Jeff Hinkle under the American V8 Road Racing team with John Debenedictis as crew chief. The car was orange and purple with stripes of many of the other challenger colors to celebrate the current stable of cars for the street. It is powered by a Penske Engines Mopar R5 / P7 carbureted engine producing 855 hp (638 kW). In its debut, it qualified 16th and finished 9th out of a field of 24.

At all Superbike World Championship races held in the United States, Fiat's Alfa Romeo safety car is replaced with Chrysler's Dodge Challenger.

== Discontinuation ==
On August 15, 2022, Stellantis formally announced that Dodge Challenger, Charger, and Chrysler 300 production would end following the 2023 model year, stating tightening U.S. EPA emissions requirements as reasons for doing so. In response, the company announced a series of "Last-Call" models with special paint and unique trims in order to commemorate the Challenger and Charger. The final Dodge Challenger, a Pitch-Black Demon 170, rolled off the Brampton assembly line on December 22, 2023; it was also the last vehicle built on a derivative of the long-running Chrysler LX platform, in production since the 2005 model year. Following the end of production, the Brampton, Ontario assembly plant was re-tooled to assemble the next-generation Jeep Compass.

The 2024 Dodge Charger line includes a three-door liftback replacing the Challenger.
