= Dodge Fast Four =

Dodge Fast Four 1927-1928
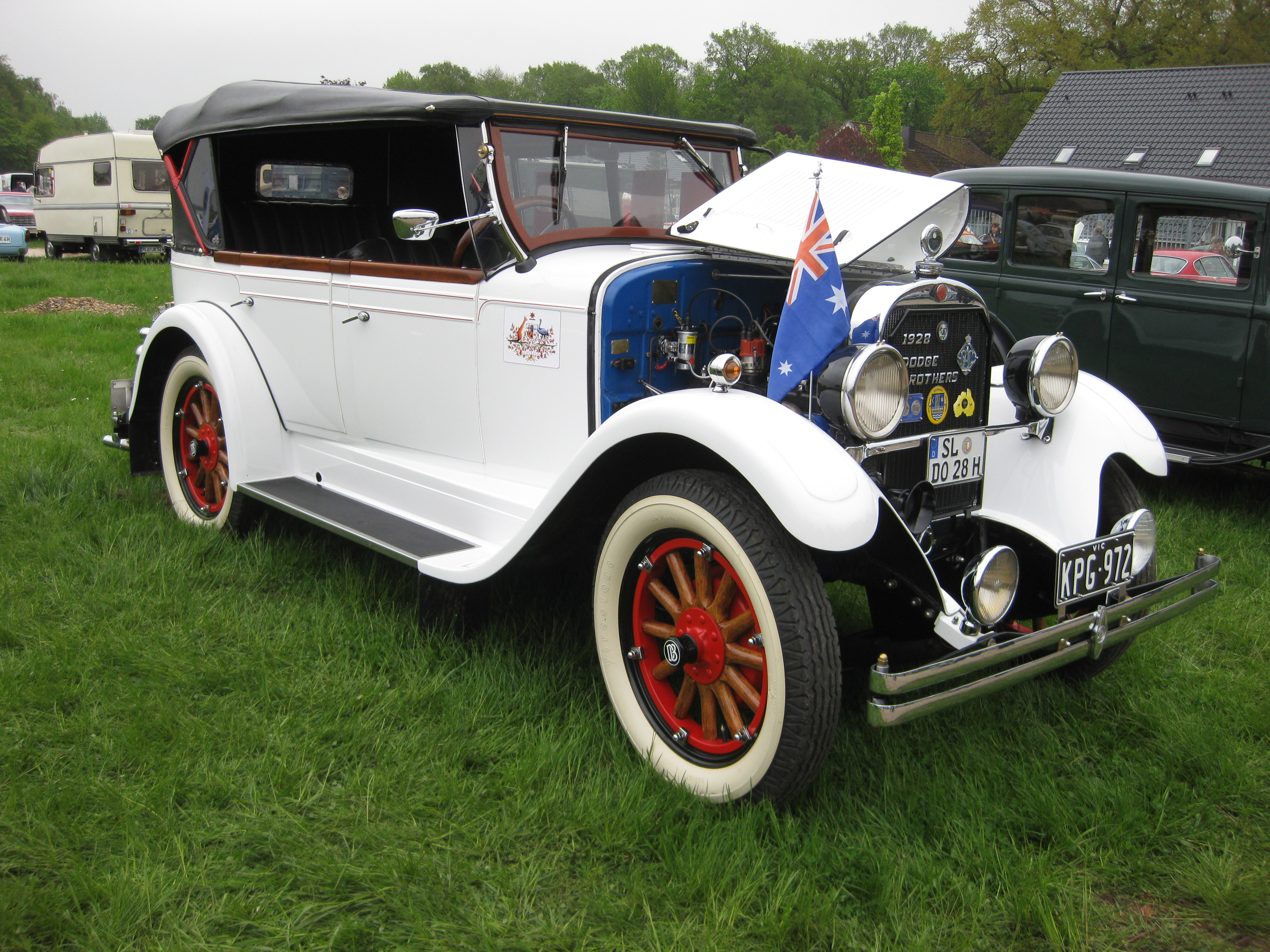

Overview
- Assembly: Detroit/Hamtramck Assembly, Detroit, Michigan

Body and chassis
- Layout: FR

Powertrain
- Engine: 212.3CID 1-bbl. L-head I4
- Transmission: 3-speed manual

Dimensions
- Wheelbase: 108 in (2,743 mm)

Chronology
- Predecessor: Dodge Series 116
- Successor: Dodge Wayfarer

The Dodge Fast Four is a model made by Dodge from 1927 until 1928. It came in three types, series 124, 128 and 129. The original 4 block was improved to five cam bearings, semi-pressure oiling, plus two intake ports and four exhaust ports arranged in a non-crossflow arrangement. All this was good for 44 horsepower.

In 1927, the Dodge Fast Four was the new mid-level car from Dodge. The Fast Four looked similar to earlier 4-cylinder Dodges, but the body was more rounded. Standard equipment included a speedometer, an ammeter, a tool kit, and a headlight dimmer. Optional items included things like a rear bumper, a Motometer, a heater, and windshield wipers. The only real difference between the 128 and the 129 was that the 128 had 19-inch wheels, while the 129 had 21-inch wheels.
