= Dodge 30-35 =

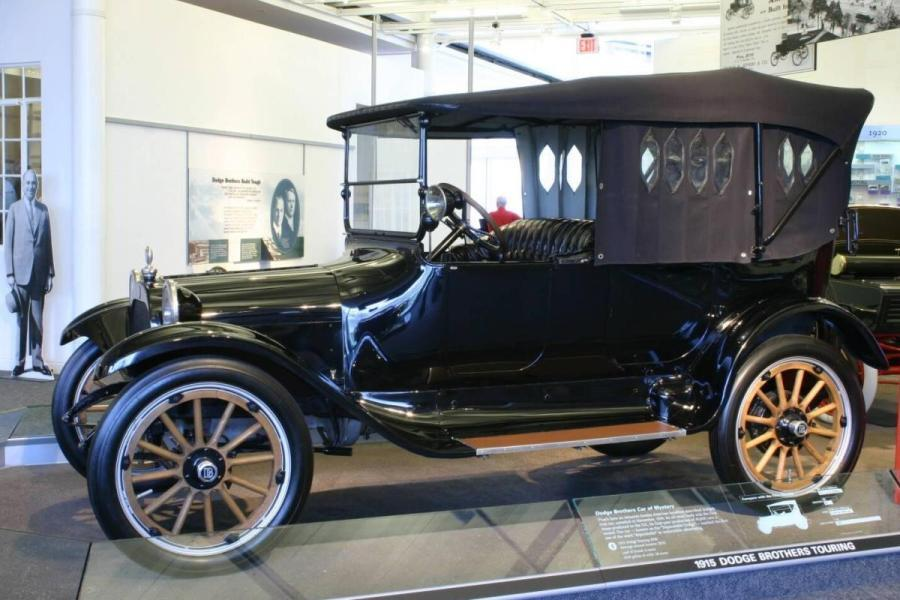
- 1915 Dodge 30-35

Overview
- Manufacturer: Dodge
- Production: 1914–1916
- Assembly: Detroit/Hamtramck Assembly, Detroit, Michigan

Body and chassis
- Class: Mid-size car
- Body style: 2-door touring 2-door roadster

Chronology
- Successor: Dodge Model 30

The Dodge 30-35 was the first car produced by Dodge, introduced on November 14, 1914 and manufactured in Detroit, Michigan.

The car had an L-head inline-four engine of 212-cubic-inch (3.5 L) displacement, which had a power output of 35 hp (26 kW). The rear wheels were driven by a leather cone clutch and a three-speed gearbox with middle gear. The rear wheels were braked mechanically. In the short model year of 1914 the only body offered was a four-door tourer (whose driver “door” could not be opened); from January 1915, a two-door two-seat roadster was also available. From this point on, electric lighting was also standard equipment.

When the series was replaced in July 1916 by the Model 30, a total of 116,400 copies were made, of which 150 were also made by the United States Army and others.
