= Dodge Series 116 =

Dodge Brothers Series 116
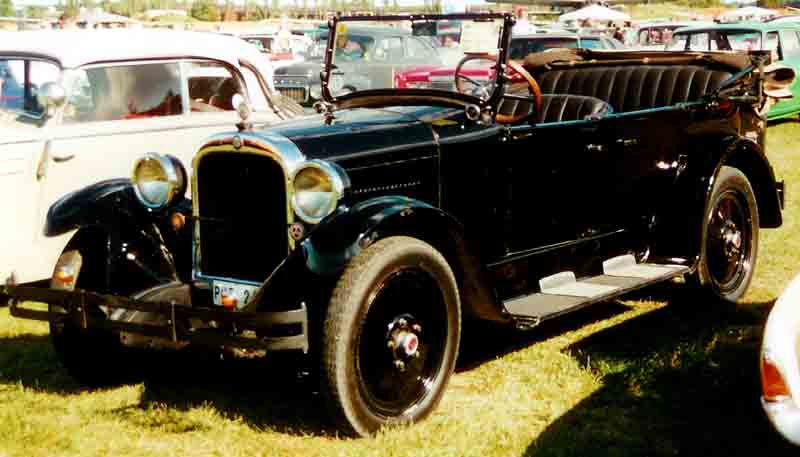
- 1924 Dodge Brothers Series 116 Touring

Overview
- Manufacturer: Dodge
- Model years: 1923–1926
- Assembly: United States: Detroit, Michigan (Detroit/Hamtramck Assembly)

Body and chassis
- Layout: Front-engine, rear-wheel-drive

Powertrain
- Engine: 212.3 cu in (3.5 L) I4
- Transmission: 3-speed manual

Dimensions
- Wheelbase: 116 in (2,946.4 mm)
- Curb weight: 2,495 lb (1,132 kg)

Chronology
- Predecessor: Dodge Model 30
- Successor: Dodge Fast Four

The Dodge Series 116, named after its 116" wheelbase, was a middle class automobile made by Dodge from July 9th, 1923 to 1926 as their main model. The model was updated in 1924 with a higher hood line, a rear brake light, and new springs. It came equipped with a three-speed standard manual transmission and an advertised 35 horsepower Flathead four-cylinder engine. The gearing in the rear differential was reduced giving the car a top speed of around 40 miles an hour, slightly slower than earlier models. Depending on the body style, Luxury optional equipment included door locks, transmission lock, exhaust heater, disk wheels or wood spoke wheels with demountable rims, and roll-down windows.

The car used a positive ground to help with corrosion issues. It had an all steel body, starter generator chained directly into the engine and a vacuum tank for pulling fuel into the carburetor. In 1926 they switched to 6-volt which was the standard of the time. They would switch back to 12-volt with other auto manufactures in the mid 1950s.
