= Dodge Model 30 =

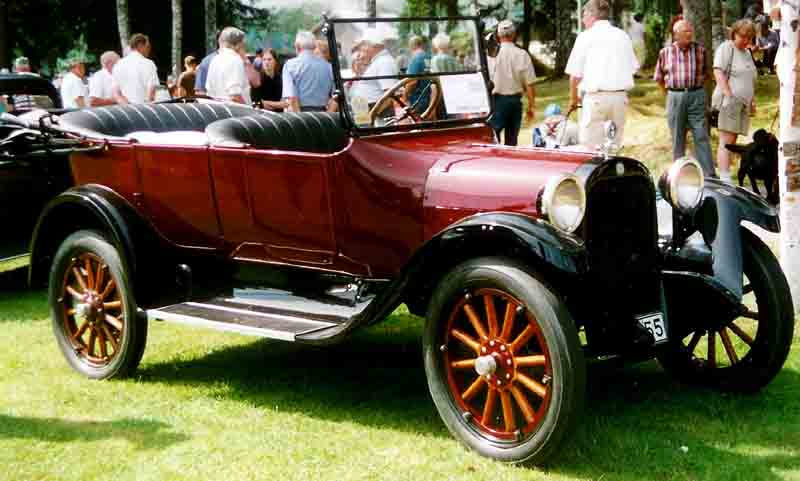
- 1919 Model 30 touring car

Overview
- Manufacturer: Dodge
- Production: 1916–1922

Body and chassis
- Body style: 4-door tourer; 2-door roadster; 4-door sedan; 2-door coupe; 2-door screen-sided pickup truck; 2-door panel truck
- Layout: Front-engine, rear-wheel-drive

Powertrain
- Engine: Dodge 212.3 cu in (3,479 cc) inline-4 L-head petrol 35 bhp (26 kW) at 2,000 rpm (Note: The engine had an S.A.E. or N.A.C.C. horsepower rating of 24 bhp (18 kW).)
- Transmission: 3F1R

Dimensions
- Wheelbase: 114 in (2.90 m)

Chronology
- Predecessor: Dodge 30-35
- Successor: Dodge Series 116

The Dodge 30 was an American car produced by Dodge, the commercial version of which was known as the Dodge Series One. Introduced in 1916, the Model 30 was a development of the company's earlier 30-35, and remained in production until 1922. The Model 30 and Series One were used extensively by the US Army during the First World War.

== Design ==
The Dodge Model 30 was a front-engine, rear-wheel-drive car, originally available as a 4-door 5-seat soft-top tourer, a 2-door 2-seat soft-top roadster, a 4-door 5-seat hard-top sedan, a 2-door 2-seat hard-top coupe, or a 2 or 4-door "Rex" model with a removable hard-top produced by the Rex Manufacturing Co. of Indiana. The Model 30 had a slightly longer wheelbase than the preceding 30-35, being 114 in (2.90 m).

The Model 30 retained the engine of the 30-35. The engine was a Dodge designed 212.3 cu in (3,479 cc) straight-four L-head petrol with a bore and stroke of 3 7/8 in × 4 1/2 in (98 mm × 114 mm). The engine produced 35 bhp (26 kW) at 2,000 rpm. The Model 30 was driven through a 3-forward, 1 reverse manual transmission and was fitted with a multiple dry disc clutch.

Series One commercial versions were rated for 1/2 short ton (0.45 t) payloads. Series One commercial vehicles were almost completely derived from the Model 30 car, differing only in that they had heavier springs, a higher angled steering column and their fuel tank was relocated under the bench seat. Originally they were only available as a pickup truck with removable wire and canvas screen sides and roof. In 1918 a hard sided panel truck body was also made available.

== History ==
The Model 30 was a development of Dodge's first car model, the 30-35 which was introduced in 1914. In July 1916, Dodge switched production to the Model 30, the primary differences from the 30-35 being a 4 in (100 mm) longer wheelbase, repositioned lights, restyled hood and four new body styles. Upon introduction base models cost US$835. The first commercial vehicle model produced by Dodge, the Series One, was based on the Model 30 and was introduced in 1917.

Production was 90,000 in 1917, (Note: Some sources claim Model 30 production in 1917 was 124,000.) 62,000 in 1918, 106,000 in 1919, 141,000 in 1920, 81,000 in 1921 and 142,000 in 1922. In 1923 the Model 30 was succeeded in production by the Series 116, and the Series One was replaced by the 3/4 short ton (0.68 t) Series Two.

=== Military service ===
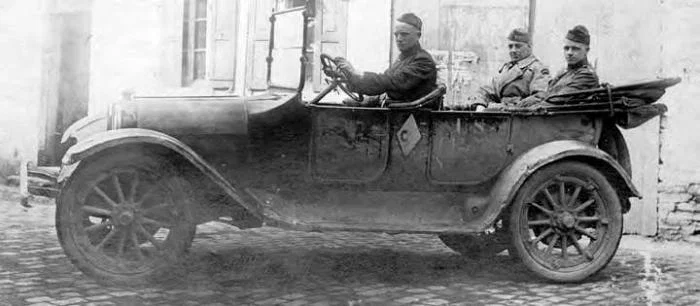
The Model 30 was the most numerous staff car in service with the American Expeditionary Forces

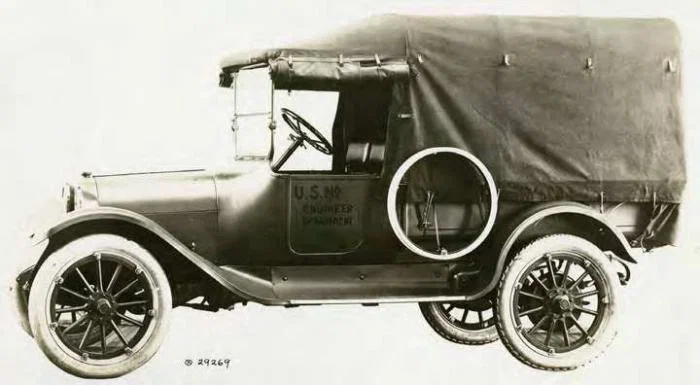
Light delivery truck

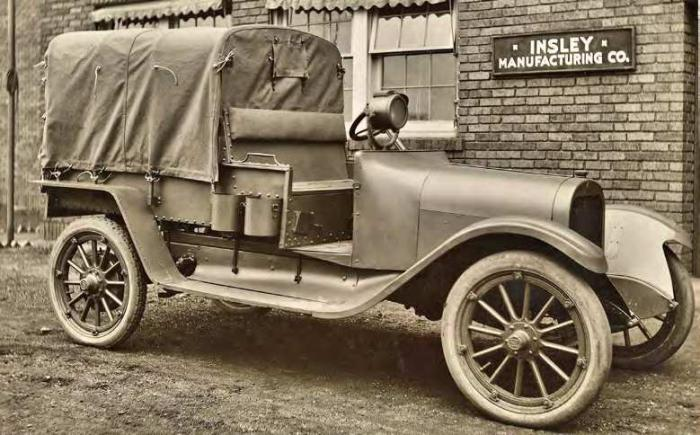
Light repair truck

The first military use of the Dodge cars occurred in 1916, when a number of touring cars were included in the motor column of the punitive Pancho Villa Expedition, commanded by General John J. Pershing. During the expedition Dodge cars were used alongside Ford Model Ts as both staff cars and reconnaissance vehicles, in the latter role their range, speed, durability and reliability were found to be far superior to horse mounted cavalry. During the campaign, Pershing abandoned his official Buick Six staff car in favour of a smaller but more mobile Dodge.

Upon the US entry to the First World War in 1917, large numbers of Model 30s were ordered by the US Army. The Model 30 was selected as the US Army's standard staff car during the War, and orders were placed for 8,559 soft-top, 3,201 hard-top and 550 two-seat roadster staff cars. Additionally, orders were placed for 9,352 Model 30 light delivery trucks, 1,012 light repair trucks, and a smaller number of ambulances produced on the same chassis.

The light delivery truck, ambulance and light repair truck were based on the Series One commercial vehicle. The light delivery truck was effectively a 1/2-ton pickup truck, the ambulance used the same chassis fitted with a specially built enclosed body. The light repair truck was fitted out with tools, repair equipment and light lifting gear to make field repairs to artillery and motor transport, they differed from the other versions in that they were not equipped with electric starters or lights, instead being started by hand-crank and equipped with paraffin and an acetylene lamp.

The exact number of Model 30s delivered to the US military during the First World War is disputed, but it has been estimated at least 12,000 saw service with the military. 3,390 staff cars and 1,802 light delivery and light repair trucks, and an unknown number of ambulances were delivered to France by November 1918, all two-seat military roadsters were retained in the US. Most Model 30s purchased by the US Army during the War never left the US, a large number were awaiting shipment to Europe at the time of the Armistice.

After the war all Model 30s in Europe were sold, the US government sold those in France to the French government, whilst those in Germany were sold to a British consortium who refurbished them then resold them to the public. Most military Model 30s in America were auctioned off to the public but some were retained in military service, serving until the 1930s.
