= Plug-in electric vehicles in the United States and Canada by charging connector =

Types of Charging Connectors
- Pinouts for J1772-2009 Type 1. This view is facing the plug end.

- Drawing of J1772 (CCS1 Combo) connector, with labeled pinouts. This is a view facing the end of the plug.

- Pinout for NACS, looking at connector.

- Pinouts for CHAdeMO, looking at end of vehicle connector.

Plug-in electric vehicles in the United States and Canada by charging connector are, in practice, defined by a small number of charging interfaces. Although many connector types exist globally, only a few are used on light-duty plug-in vehicles sold in the two countries. This article summarizes the main connector families used on battery electric vehicles (BEVs) and plug-in hybrid electric vehicles (PHEVs) in the United States and Canada, and outlines how manufacturers and charging networks have adopted them.

In North America, most AC charging for non-Tesla plug-in vehicles uses the single-phase SAE J1772 connector, commonly referred to as "Type 1". DC fast charging is dominated by the Combined Charging System Type 1 (CCS1), which combines a J1772-style AC inlet with additional high-current DC contacts, and by the North American Charging Standard (NACS) used on Tesla vehicles and increasingly on other brands.

The CHAdeMO fast-charging connector, once common on Japanese BEVs, has largely been phased out in North America and in recent years remains mainly on the Nissan Leaf and Mitsubishi Outlander PHEV.

== Shorthand codes and standards mapping ==
The article uses the following shorthand for connector families, which correspond broadly to configurations defined in international standards such as IEC 62196 and SAE recommended practices:

Code	Name (common)	Representative standard	Typical use on US/Canada light-duty vehicles
NACS	North American Charging Standard	SAE J3400	AC and DC charging on Tesla vehicles and, from the mid-2020s, selected other makes.
Type 1	SAE J1772 single-phase AC	SAE J1772	AC charging on almost all non-Tesla plug-in vehicles; Teslas use it via an adapter when charging away from Superchargers.
Type 2	IEC Type 2 (Mennekes)	IEC 62196 Type 2	Standard AC connector in Europe; not used on factory-built US/Canada passenger vehicles.
Type 3	Type 3 (Scame)	IEC 62196 Type 3	Legacy Italian connector, effectively obsolete and not used on modern North American passenger vehicles.
AA	CHAdeMO	IEC 62196-3 configuration AA	Legacy DC fast charging on some Japanese vehicles; in recent years confined in North America mainly to the Nissan Leaf and Mitsubishi Outlander PHEV.
BB	GB/T	GB/T 20234	AC and DC connectors used in China; not used on North American market passenger vehicles.
ChaoJi	ChaoJi	Under development (CHAdeMO–GB/T)	Next-generation Asian DC system under development; not deployed on North American light-duty vehicles as of the mid-2020s.
EE	CCS Combo 1 (CCS1)	IEC 62196 Combo Type 1	Dominant non-Tesla DC fast-charging connector in North America, combining a J1772 inlet with two DC pins.
FF	CCS Combo 2 (CCS2)	IEC 62196 Combo Type 2	CCS variant used primarily in Europe and some other regions; not used on factory-built US/Canada passenger vehicles.
MCS	Megawatt Charging System	CharIN MCS	High-power DC standard intended for heavy-duty trucks and buses; not used on light-duty cars.

== Connector families in North America ==
=== Type 1 (SAE J1772) AC connector ===
The SAE J1772 connector, often called "Type 1" or simply "J plug", is the standard AC connector for Level 1 and Level 2 charging on non-Tesla plug-in vehicles in North America. It supports single-phase AC charging at 120 V or 240 V and is widely used in homes, workplaces and public Level 2 stations.

Natural Resources Canada and multiple consumer guides describe J1772 as the default connector for most plug-in cars and PHEVs sold in Canada and the United States, with Tesla vehicles using a compact adapter when charging on non-Tesla AC infrastructure.

=== CCS Combo 1 (CCS1) ===
The Combined Charging System (CCS) is a family of DC fast-charging standards that builds on the J1772 inlet. The CCS Combo 1 connector (CCS1) adds two high-current DC pins beneath a J1772-style AC interface, allowing the same vehicle inlet to accept AC charging at Level 1/2 and DC fast charging from compatible stations.

The U.S. Department of Energy notes that there are three principal DC fast-charging systems in North America—CCS, CHAdeMO and Tesla's connector—and that "most EV models on the market can charge using the CCS connector". CCS1 is fitted to the majority of non-Tesla BEVs sold in the region, including mass-market crossovers and sedans from domestic and imported brands, and is widely deployed on public fast-charging networks.

=== North American Charging Standard (NACS / SAE J3400) ===
Tesla introduced its own compact AC/DC connector with the launch of the Tesla Model S in 2012. In 2022 the company published the design as the "North American Charging System" and invited other manufacturers and charging-network operators to adopt it. In 2023–24, SAE International standardized the connector as SAE J3400, and the U.S. Joint Office of Energy and Transportation described J3400 as an "openly available" fast-charging connector for use by any manufacturer.

NACS is used for both AC and DC charging on Tesla vehicles in North America and allows access to the Tesla Supercharger network. Industry sources note that Tesla vehicles account for a majority of the U.S. EV fleet and that NACS is therefore already the most common physical connector on vehicles, even though public charging infrastructure has historically been built around CCS1.

From 2023 onward, many major automakers—including Ford, General Motors, Volvo, Polestar, Mercedes-Benz, Nissan and others—announced plans to add NACS ports or provide NACS adapters for vehicles sold in North America, beginning with the 2025 model year and later. In 2026, a third-generation Nissan Leaf for the North American market is scheduled to become the first Nissan EV with a factory-equipped NACS port, replacing its earlier CHAdeMO inlet.

=== CHAdeMO (configuration AA) ===
CHAdeMO is a DC fast-charging system developed by a Japanese industry consortium in the late 2000s and standardized internationally in 2014. It was adopted on early Japanese BEVs such as the Nissan Leaf and Mitsubishi i-MiEV, and on some PHEVs, and was installed on many dual-standard fast chargers in Europe and North America.

By the early 2020s, most non-Japanese manufacturers had standardized on CCS for new vehicles, and several governments and networks began phasing out CHAdeMO connectors from new public installations. As of the mid-2020s, the CHAdeMO organisation and independent summaries report that the Nissan Leaf remains the last fully electric car sold in North America with a CHAdeMO inlet, and that the Mitsubishi Outlander PHEV is the only PHEV in the region equipped with CHAdeMO fast charging.

=== Other connector families ===
Several connector types that appear in international standards or are widely used in other regions are not fitted to factory-built light-duty passenger vehicles for the U.S. or Canadian markets:

- Type 2 (Mennekes) and CCS2 are the dominant AC and DC connectors for EVs in much of Europe and some other regions, but vehicles imported for North America are generally equipped instead with J1772 and CCS1 inlets.
- GB/T connectors used in China, and their planned successor ChaoJi, are not used on North American passenger vehicles, although some multi-standard fast chargers may provide GB/T or ChaoJi connectors in ports serving imported heavy vehicles.
- MCS (Megawatt Charging System) is intended for high-power heavy-duty vehicles and is not present on light-duty cars as of the mid-2020s.

== Use by vehicle type ==
=== Battery electric vehicles ===
Government and industry guidance for consumers commonly describe three principal DC fast-charging systems available to North American BEV drivers: CCS, CHAdeMO and Tesla/NACS. In broad terms:

- Tesla vehicles use the NACS connector for both AC and DC charging and can access the Tesla Supercharger network as well as compatible third-party stations.
- Most non-Tesla BEVs sold since the mid-2010s combine a J1772 (Type 1) AC inlet with CCS1 DC capability and can therefore use a large share of public fast-charging sites in the United States and Canada.
- A shrinking minority of BEVs retain CHAdeMO DC ports, with the Leaf identified as the last such BEV on sale in North America before its redesign in 2026.

=== Plug-in hybrid electric vehicles ===
PHEVs in North America typically support AC charging only and are equipped with a J1772 (Type 1) inlet for Level 1 and Level 2 charging. The U.S. Environmental Protection Agency notes that not all plug-in vehicles offer DC fast-charging capabilities and that those which do use one of the same three DC systems as BEVs (CCS, CHAdeMO or Tesla/NACS).

The Mitsubishi Outlander PHEV is a notable exception among North American PHEVs in that it offers DC fast charging via CHAdeMO, pairing the CHAdeMO inlet with a separate J1772 port for AC charging.

== Automaker transition towards NACS ==
Following Tesla's decision to publish the NACS design and SAE's work to standardize it as J3400, a series of major automakers announced that they would adopt NACS for future EVs in the United States and Canada or provide NACS-to-CCS1 adapters for existing models.

Industry reports and government briefings describe a transition period in which:

- CCS1 remains the dominant interface on public fast-charging stations, especially those funded under federal and provincial programs that initially specified CCS connectors.
- Tesla Supercharger sites are gradually opened to non-Tesla vehicles via adapters and, in some cases, by adding CCS or NACS connectors to existing cabinets.
- New BEV models scheduled for the latter half of the 2020s increasingly announce native NACS ports for the North American market while retaining CCS2 in other regions.

Analysts have noted that this transition reflects both the large installed base of Tesla vehicles and the perceived reliability and geographic reach of the Supercharger network compared with some early CCS deployments.

== Battery electric vehicles (BEVs) by connector ==
The following table summarizes BEVs sold in the United States and Canada from model year 2020 onward, grouped by manufacturer. For brevity, only mainstream models and significant new introductions are listed. AC charging uses either NACS or Type 1; DC fast charging uses NACS, EE (CCS1), or in a few legacy cases AA (CHAdeMO).

Manufacturer	Model	Powertrain	Market years (US/Canada)	AC connector(s)	DC connector(s)	Notes
Tesla	Model S	BEV	2012–2026	NACS	NACS	All North American Teslas use NACS for AC and DC charging from launch.
Tesla	Model X	BEV	2015–2026	NACS	NACS	Same connector as Model S.
Tesla	Model 3	BEV	2017–present	NACS	NACS	Compact sedan; NACS throughout production.
Tesla	Model Y	BEV	2020–present	NACS	NACS	Crossover SUV; NACS throughout production.
Tesla	Cybertruck	BEV	2023–present	NACS	NACS	Pickup truck; NACS only.
Hyundai	Kona Electric	BEV	2019–present	Type 1	EE (CCS1)	Subcompact crossover; CCS1 for DC charging.
Hyundai	Ioniq 5	BEV	2022–2024	Type 1	EE (CCS1)	CCS1 vehicles for early North American model years.
Hyundai	Ioniq 5	BEV	2025–present	NACS	NACS	Mid-cycle update adds native NACS port for AC and DC charging in North America.
Hyundai	Ioniq 6	BEV	2023–2025	Type 1	EE (CCS1)	Streamlined sedan; CCS1 for DC charging.
Hyundai	Ioniq 9	BEV	2026–present	NACS	NACS	Three-row SUV announced with NACS as standard in North America.
Kia	Niro EV	BEV	2019–present	Type 1	EE (CCS1)	Subcompact crossover; CCS1 only.
Kia	Soul EV (Canada)	BEV	2020–present	Type 1	EE (CCS1)	Sold mainly in Canada; CCS1 DC fast charging.
Kia	EV6	BEV	2022–2024	Type 1	EE (CCS1)	First model years with CCS1.
Kia	EV6	BEV	2025–present	NACS	NACS	Transition to native NACS port for North America.
Kia	EV9	BEV	2024–2025	Type 1	EE (CCS1)	Large three-row SUV; early years CCS1.
Kia	EV9	BEV	2026–present	NACS	NACS	Switch to NACS port from later model years.
Kia	EV4	BEV	2026– (planned)	NACS	NACS	Compact crossover announced with NACS in North America.
Nissan	Leaf	BEV	2011–2025	Type 1	AA (CHAdeMO)	Only mass-market BEV with CHAdeMO DC fast charging in the mid-2020s.
Nissan	Leaf (redesign)	BEV	2026–present	Type 1	NACS	Redesigned model moves to NACS DC fast charging while retaining a Type 1 AC inlet.
Nissan	Ariya	BEV	2023–present	Type 1	EE (CCS1)	Uses CCS1 for DC; access to NACS network via adapter.
Ford	Mustang Mach-E	BEV	2021–present	Type 1	EE (CCS1)	Crossover; CCS1 DC fast charging.
Ford	F-150 Lightning	BEV	2022–2025	Type 1	EE (CCS1)	Full-size pickup; CCS1.
Ford	E-Transit	BEV	2022–present	Type 1	EE (CCS1)	Commercial van; CCS1.
General Motors (Chevrolet)	Bolt EV	BEV	2017–2023	Type 1	EE (CCS1)	Compact hatchback; CCS1 DC fast charging.
GM (Chevrolet)	Bolt EUV	BEV	2022–2023	Type 1	EE (CCS1)	Crossover variant.
GM (Chevrolet)	Blazer EV	BEV	2024–present	Type 1	EE (CCS1)	Mid-size crossover; Ultium platform.
GM (Chevrolet)	Equinox EV	BEV	2024–present	Type 1	EE (CCS1)	Compact crossover; CCS1.
GM (Chevrolet)	Silverado EV	BEV	2024–present	Type 1	EE (CCS1)	Full-size pickup; CCS1.
GM (GMC)	Hummer EV pickup/SUV	BEV	2022–present	Type 1	EE (CCS1)	Uses CCS1 DC fast charging.
GM (GMC)	Sierra EV	BEV	2024–present	Type 1	EE (CCS1)	Full-size pickup; CCS1.
Cadillac	Lyriq	BEV	2023–present	Type 1	EE (CCS1)	Luxury SUV; CCS1.
Cadillac	Escalade IQ/IQL	BEV	2025–present	Type 1	EE (CCS1)	Full-size luxury SUV; CCS1.
Cadillac	Optiq	BEV	2025 (early)	Type 1	EE (CCS1)	Initial model year with CCS1.
Cadillac	Optiq	BEV	2026–present	NACS	NACS	Transition to native NACS port in North America.
Rivian	R1T	BEV	2021–2025	Type 1	EE (CCS1)	Adventure-oriented pickup with CCS1.
Rivian	R1S	BEV	2022–2025	Type 1	EE (CCS1)	SUV counterpart to R1T.
Rivian	R1T	BEV	2026–present	NACS	NACS	Switch to native NACS inlets.
Rivian	R1S	BEV	2026–present	NACS	NACS	Switch to native NACS inlets.
Rivian	Rivian R2	BEV	2026–present	NACS	NACS	Smaller SUV announced with NACS from launch.
Volkswagen	ID.4	BEV	2021–present	Type 1	EE (CCS1)	Compact crossover; CCS1 DC charging.
Volkswagen	ID.7	BEV	2025–present	Type 1	EE (CCS1)	Mid-size sedan; CCS1.
Volkswagen	ID. Buzz	BEV	2025–present	Type 1	EE (CCS1)	Minivan; CCS1.
BMW	i3 (hatchback)	BEV	2014-2021 (US)	Type 1	EE (CCS1)	Early BEV; remained CCS1 to end of U.S. sales.
BMW	i3 (Sedan)	BEV	2027–present	NACS	NACS	Compact sedan; NACS in North America.
BMW	i4	BEV	2022–present	Type 1	EE (CCS1)	Fastback sedan; CCS1.
BMW	i5	BEV	2024–2026 (early)	Type 1	EE (CCS1)	Executive sedan; CCS1.
BMW	i5	BEV	2026–present	NACS	NACS	Executive sedan; NACS.
BMW	i7	BEV	2023–2026	Type 1	EE (CCS1)	Flagship sedan; CCS1.
BMW	i7	BEV	2027–present	NACS	NACS	Flagship sedan; NACS.
BMW	iX3	BEV	2027–present	NACS	NACS	SUV; NACS.
BMW	iX	BEV	2022–present	Type 1	EE (CCS1)	SUV; CCS1.
Mercedes-Benz	EQB	BEV	2022–present	Type 1	EE (CCS1)	Compact SUV; CCS1.
Mercedes-Benz	EQE (sedan/SUV)	BEV	2023–present	Type 1	EE (CCS1)	Mid-size models; CCS1.
Mercedes-Benz	EQS (sedan/SUV)	BEV	2022–present	Type 1	EE (CCS1)	Flagship EVs; CCS1.
Porsche	Taycan	BEV	2020–present	Type 1	EE (CCS1)	Sports sedan and wagon; CCS1 DC charging.
Porsche	Macan Electric	BEV	2025–present	Type 1	EE (CCS1)	Compact SUV on electric platform.
Volvo	XC40 Recharge	BEV	2021–present	Type 1	EE (CCS1)	Compact SUV; CCS1.
Volvo	C40 Recharge	BEV	2022–present	Type 1	EE (CCS1)	Coupe-style SUV; CCS1.
Volvo	EX30	BEV	2025–present	Type 1	EE (CCS1)	Subcompact SUV; CCS1.
Volvo	EX90	BEV	2025–present	Type 1	EE (CCS1)	Three-row SUV; CCS1.
Polestar	Polestar 2	BEV	2021–present	Type 1	EE (CCS1)	Fastback sedan; CCS1.
Polestar	Polestar 3	BEV	2024–present	Type 1	EE (CCS1)	Large SUV; CCS1.
Polestar	Polestar 4	BEV	2024–present	Type 1	EE (CCS1)	Coupé SUV; CCS1.
Lucid	Air	BEV	2021–present	Type 1	EE (CCS1)	Luxury sedan; CCS1 DC fast charging.
Lucid	Gravity	BEV	2025–present	NACS	NACS	Announced with NACS for North American market.
Subaru	Solterra	BEV	2023–2025	Type 1	EE (CCS1)	Compact SUV; CCS1 in early years.
Subaru	Solterra	BEV	2026–present	NACS	NACS	Adoption of NACS with update.
Toyota	bZ4X	BEV	2023–2025	Type 1	EE (CCS1)	Compact SUV; CCS1 in early years.
Toyota	bZ	BEV	2026–present	NACS	NACS	Adoption of NACS with update.
Mazda	MX-30	BEV	2022–2023 (limited)	Type 1	EE (CCS1)	Limited-release crossover; CCS1.
Jaguar	I-Pace	BEV	2019–2024	Type 1	EE (CCS1)	Luxury crossover; CCS1 DC charging.
Mini	Cooper SE	BEV	2020–present	Type 1	EE (CCS1)	Subcompact hatchback; CCS1.
VinFast	VinFast VF8/VF9	BEV	2023–present	Type 1	EE (CCS1)	Vietnamese-built SUVs; CCS1 for North America.

== Plug-in hybrid electric vehicles (PHEVs) by connector ==
Most PHEVs sold in the United States and Canada from 2020 onward use Type 1 for AC charging only, with no DC fast-charging capability. An exception is the Mitsubishi Outlander PHEV, which uses AA (CHAdeMO) for DC, and some newer models that add CCS1 DC charging.

The table below groups PHEVs by manufacturer and summarizes their connector configurations for North America.

Manufacturer	Model(s) (US/Canada, 2020+)	AC connector(s)	DC connector(s)	Notes
Toyota	Prius Prime	Type 1	None	Compact hatchback PHEV; AC charging only.
Toyota	RAV4 Prime (2021–2025)	Type 1	None	First-generation RAV4 PHEV; AC only.
Toyota	RAV4 Plug-in Hybrid (2026–, selected trims)	Type 1	EE (CCS1)	New generation adds CCS1 DC fast charging on certain trims.
Mitsubishi	Mitsubishi Outlander PHEV	Type 1	AA (CHAdeMO)	One of the only PHEVs in North America with DC fast charging via CHAdeMO.
Hyundai	Tucson PHEV	Type 1	None	Mid-size crossover; AC charging only.
Hyundai	Santa Fe PHEV	Type 1	None	Mid-size crossover; AC charging only.
Kia	Niro PHEV	Type 1	None	Compact PHEV; AC only.
Kia	Sorento PHEV	Type 1	None	Mid-size PHEV; AC only.
Kia	Sportage PHEV	Type 1	None	Mid-size PHEV; AC only.
Ford	Escape PHEV	Type 1	None	Compact SUV; AC only.
Lincoln	Corsair Grand Touring (PHEV)	Type 1	None	Luxury compact SUV PHEV; AC only.
Jeep	Wrangler 4xe, Grand Cherokee 4xe	Type 1	None	Off-road oriented PHEVs; AC only.
Chrysler	Pacifica Hybrid	Type 1	None	Minivan PHEV; AC charging only.
BMW	330e	Type 1	None	Sedan PHEV; AC only in North America.
BMW	530e	Type 1	None	Sedan PHEV; AC only in North America.
BMW	750e	Type 1	None	Sedan PHEV; AC only in North America.
BMW	X3 xDrive30e	Type 1	None	SUV PHEV; AC only in North America.
BMW	X5 xDrive45e/50e	Type 1	None	SUV PHEV; AC only in North America.
BMW	XM 50e/XM	Type 1	None	SUV PHEV; AC only in North America.
Mercedes-Benz	Various C-, E-, S- and GLE-Class PHEVs	Type 1	None	North American PHEVs use AC charging only.
Mercedes-Benz	GLC350e	Type 1	EE (CCS1)	North American version has 60 kW DC fast charging.
Mercedes-Benz	GLE450e	Type 1	EE (CCS1)	North American version has 60 kW DC fast charging.
Volvo	XC60 Recharge	Type 1	None	PHEV models marketed as Recharge; AC only.
Volvo	XC90 Recharge	Type 1	None	PHEV models marketed as Recharge; AC only.
Volvo	S60 Recharge	Type 1	None	PHEV models marketed as Recharge; AC only.
Volvo	V60 Recharge	Type 1	None	PHEV models marketed as Recharge; AC only.
Alfa Romeo	Tonale PHEV	Type 1	None	Compact SUV PHEV; AC only.
Dodge	Hornet R/T PHEV	Type 1	None	Compact SUV PHEV; AC only.

== Models with connector changes ==
Although most models retain the same connector type throughout their North American production run, a growing number of BEVs are scheduled to change from CCS1 to NACS ports, or to introduce NACS on new generations. The table below highlights notable connector transitions.

Manufacturer	Model	Region	Years	AC connector(s)	DC connector(s)	Change description
Tesla	Model S, Model X, Model 3, Model Y, Cybertruck	US/Canada	2012–present	NACS	NACS	Tesla proprietary connector later standardized as NACS; no connector change over time.
Hyundai	Ioniq 5	US/Canada	2022–2024	Type 1	EE (CCS1)	Initial North American model years with CCS1.
Hyundai	Ioniq 5	US/Canada	2025–	NACS	NACS	Planned adoption of native NACS port for AC and DC charging.
Kia	EV6	US/Canada	2022–2024	Type 1	EE (CCS1)	Launch with CCS1 DC fast charging.
Kia	EV6	US/Canada	2025–	NACS	NACS	Planned migration to NACS connector.
Kia	EV9	US/Canada	2024–2025	Type 1	EE (CCS1)	First years with CCS1.
Kia	EV9	US/Canada	2026–	NACS	NACS	Planned switch to NACS.
Nissan	Leaf	US/Canada	2011–2025	Type 1	AA (CHAdeMO)	Legacy use of CHAdeMO for DC fast charging.
Nissan	Leaf (redesign)	US/Canada	2026–	Type 1	NACS	Planned redesign to adopt NACS DC fast charging while retaining Type 1 for AC.
Rivian	R1T, R1S	US/Canada	2021–2025	Type 1	EE (CCS1)	Initial models with CCS1 DC fast charging.
Rivian	R1T, R1S, R2	US/Canada	2026–	NACS	NACS	Company plans to equip future vehicles with native NACS ports.
Subaru	Solterra	US/Canada	2023–2025	Type 1	EE (CCS1)	Early production with CCS1.
Subaru	Solterra	US/Canada	2026–	NACS	NACS	Planned transition to NACS port.
GM (Cadillac)	Optiq	US/Canada	2025	Type 1	EE (CCS1)	Initial model year with CCS1.
GM (Cadillac)	Optiq, future Bolt successor	US/Canada	2026–2027–	NACS	NACS	Future vehicles announced with NACS ports from launch.

== Connectors not used on North American market light-duty vehicles ==
Several connector types that appear in international standards and in other markets do not appear on factory-built light-duty passenger vehicles in the United States and Canada as of the mid-2020s:

- Type 2 (Mennekes) and FF (CCS2) are widely used in Europe, but North American vehicles instead use Type 1 and CCS1 inlets.
- BB (GB/T) and ChaoJi serve Chinese and Japanese markets, respectively, and have not been adopted on North American passenger cars.
- MCS (Megawatt Charging System) is intended for heavy-duty trucks and buses and is not present on light-duty cars.

== See also ==
- Charging station
- Electric vehicle
- Plug-in hybrid
- Plug-in electric vehicle
- Tesla Supercharger

== Notes ==
This article focuses on factory-supplied connectors for North American market vehicles as sold by the manufacturer. Aftermarket conversions, grey imports and adapter-based charging solutions are not included.
