= General Motors BT1 platform =

GM BT1 platform
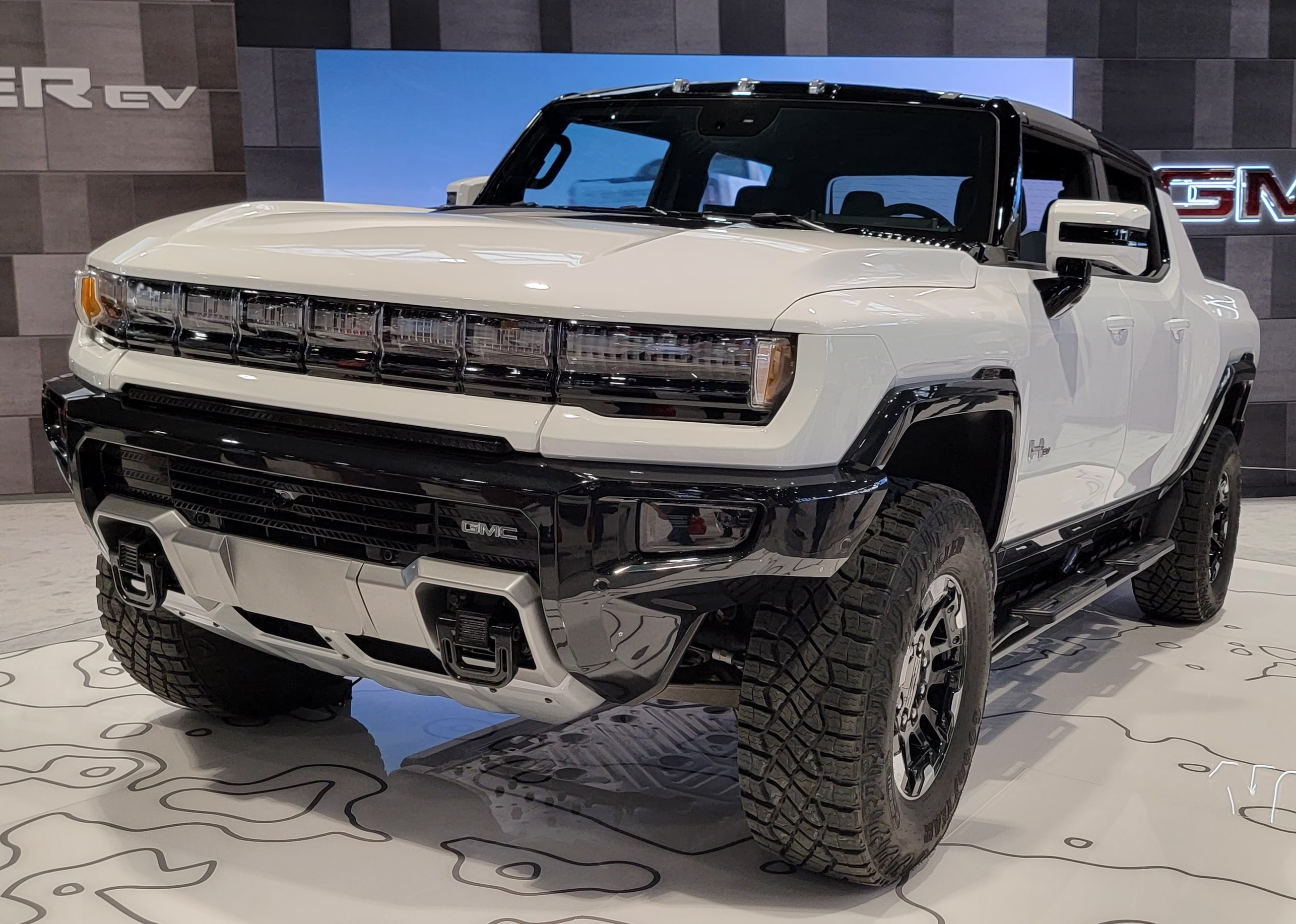
- GMC Hummer EV, the first vehicle based on the BT1 platform

Overview
- Manufacturer: General Motors
- Production: 2021–present

Body and chassis
- Layout: Dual- & triple-motor, all-wheel-drive
- Related: GM BEV3

The GM BT1 platform, marketed under Ultium branding, is a dedicated electric vehicle architecture or platform developed by General Motors (GM). It underpins electric full-size pickup trucks and SUVs sold by GM, using battery and motor technology developed under its Ultium program; these are shared with third-generation GM electric vehicles on the BEV3 platform. BT1 is categorized as a skateboard platform.

== History ==
In October 2019, GM made an agreement with the United Auto Workers (UAW) union to invest US$3 billion in Detroit/Hamtramck Assembly over the next four years, renaming it to "Factory Zero" and converting it to a factory for electric trucks and vans. The UAW's copy of the agreement revealed the "centerpiece" of the investment was a program internally called "Project O" or BT1, which would develop and begin selling a low-volume pickup truck by 2021, aimed at the high end of the market.

The same platform developed for that project, which resulted in the GMC Hummer EV, also would be used for electric versions of full-size General Motors pickup trucks (Chevrolet Silverado / GMC Sierra) and SUVs (Chevrolet Tahoe / Suburban, GMC Yukon, and Cadillac Escalade).

== Design ==
The BT1 platform is designed for full-size trucks and SUVs which currently use a body-on-frame architecture, while unibody passenger cars and crossover utility vehicles will be based on BEV3; both platforms use Ultium batteries and motors. However, Nichole Kraatz, the GM chief engineer for battery electric trucks, characterized BT1 as "not a unibody and ... not a body-on-frame", as the body has an integral floor, like a unibody, but rests on the battery structure, which also acts as a structural member. This confirmed early speculation published in 2019.

Despite its name suggesting a relation to the T1 platform, BT1 shares no parts with the older internal combustion engine full-size pickup truck and SUV platform.

As implemented for the GMC Hummer EV, BT1 has a stamped and welded steel battery case with 24 modules, totaling 246 kW-hr gross, of which 212 kW-hr are usable; the total weight of the battery alone is 2,800 lb (1,300 kg).

== Applications ==
=== Current models ===
- GMC Hummer EV (2021–present)
- Chevrolet Silverado EV / GMC Sierra EV (2023–present)
- Cadillac Escalade IQ (2024–present)
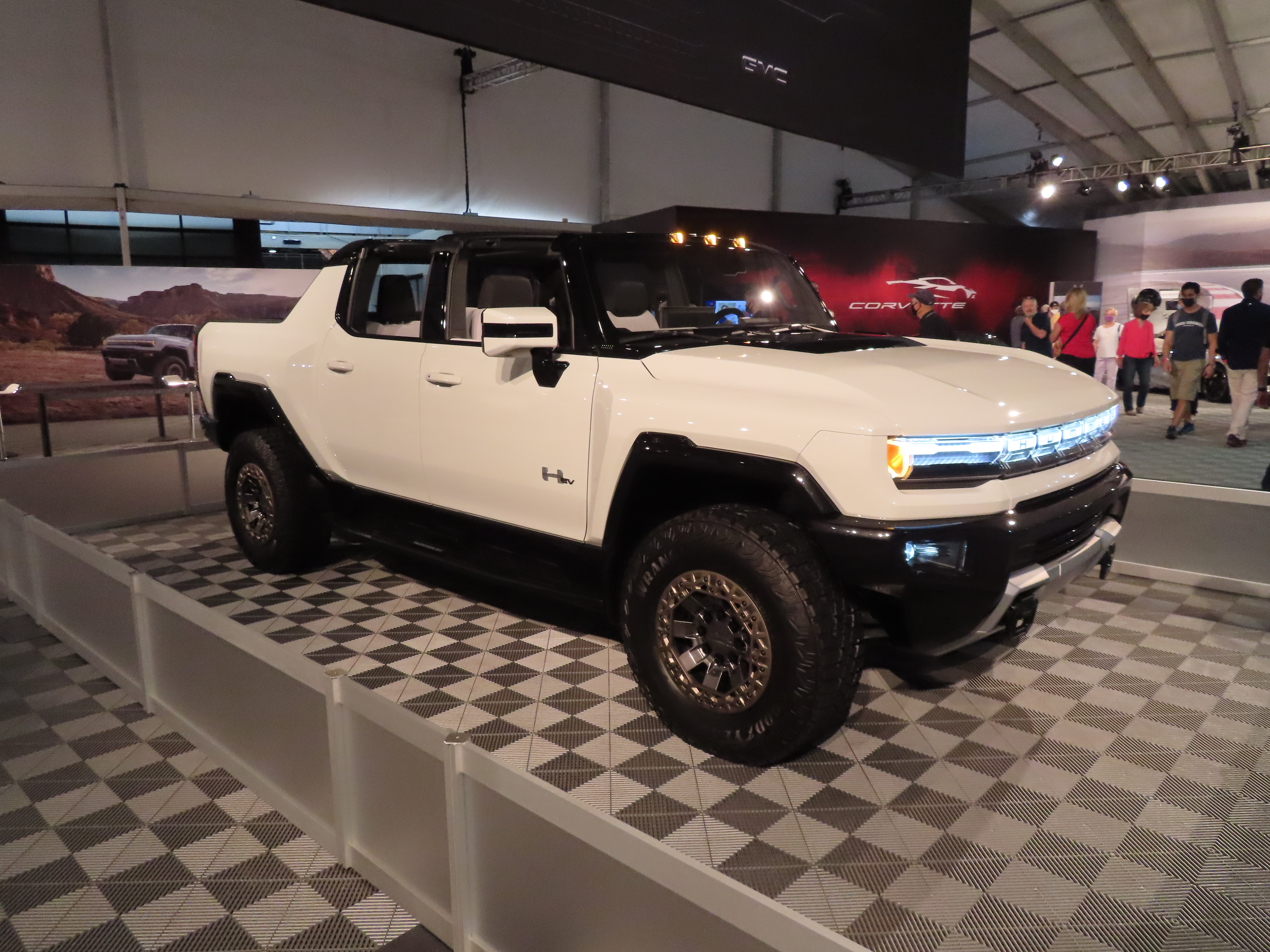
GMC Hummer EV (SUT)

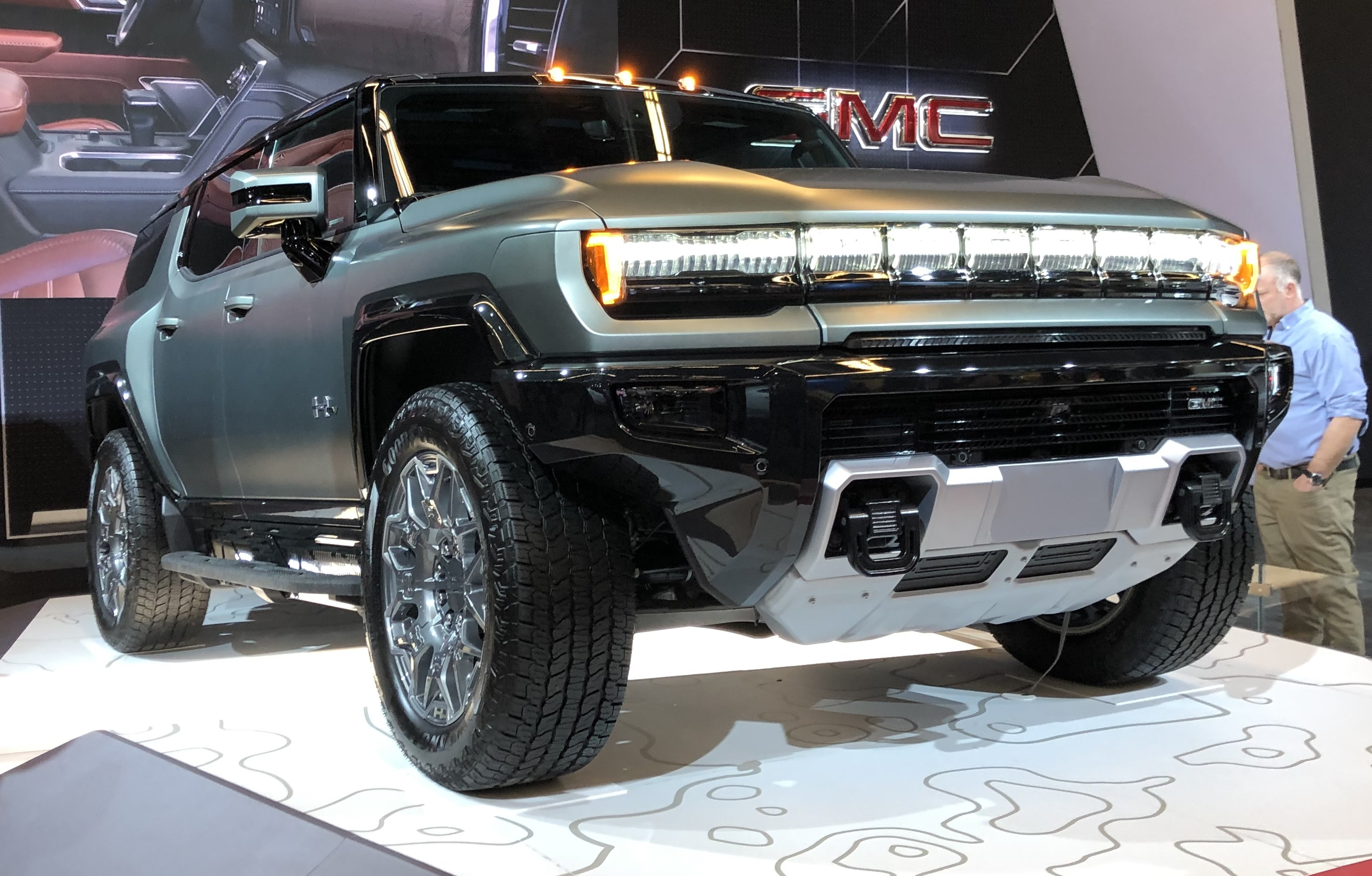
GMC Hummer EV (SUV)

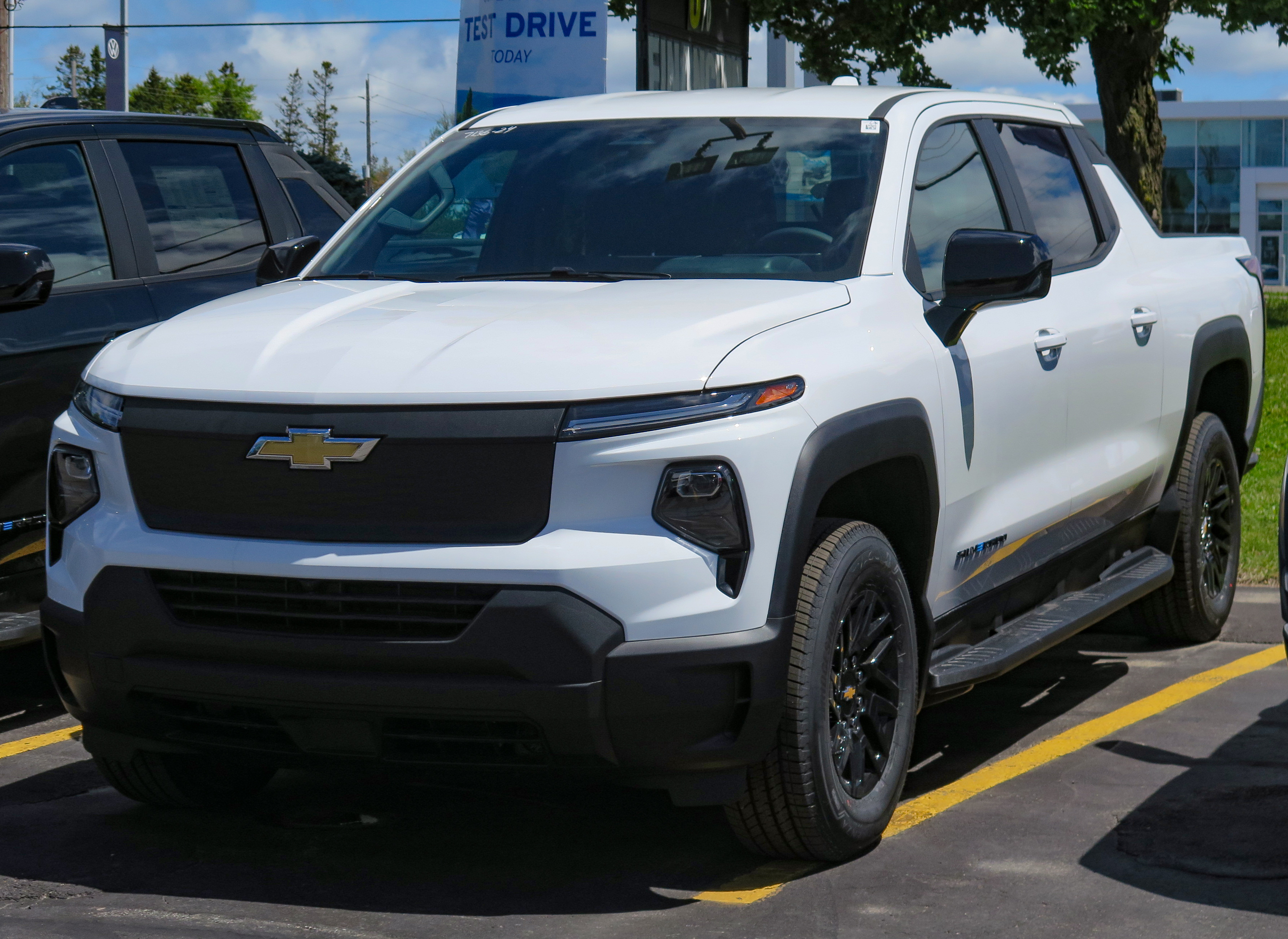
Chevrolet Silverado EV

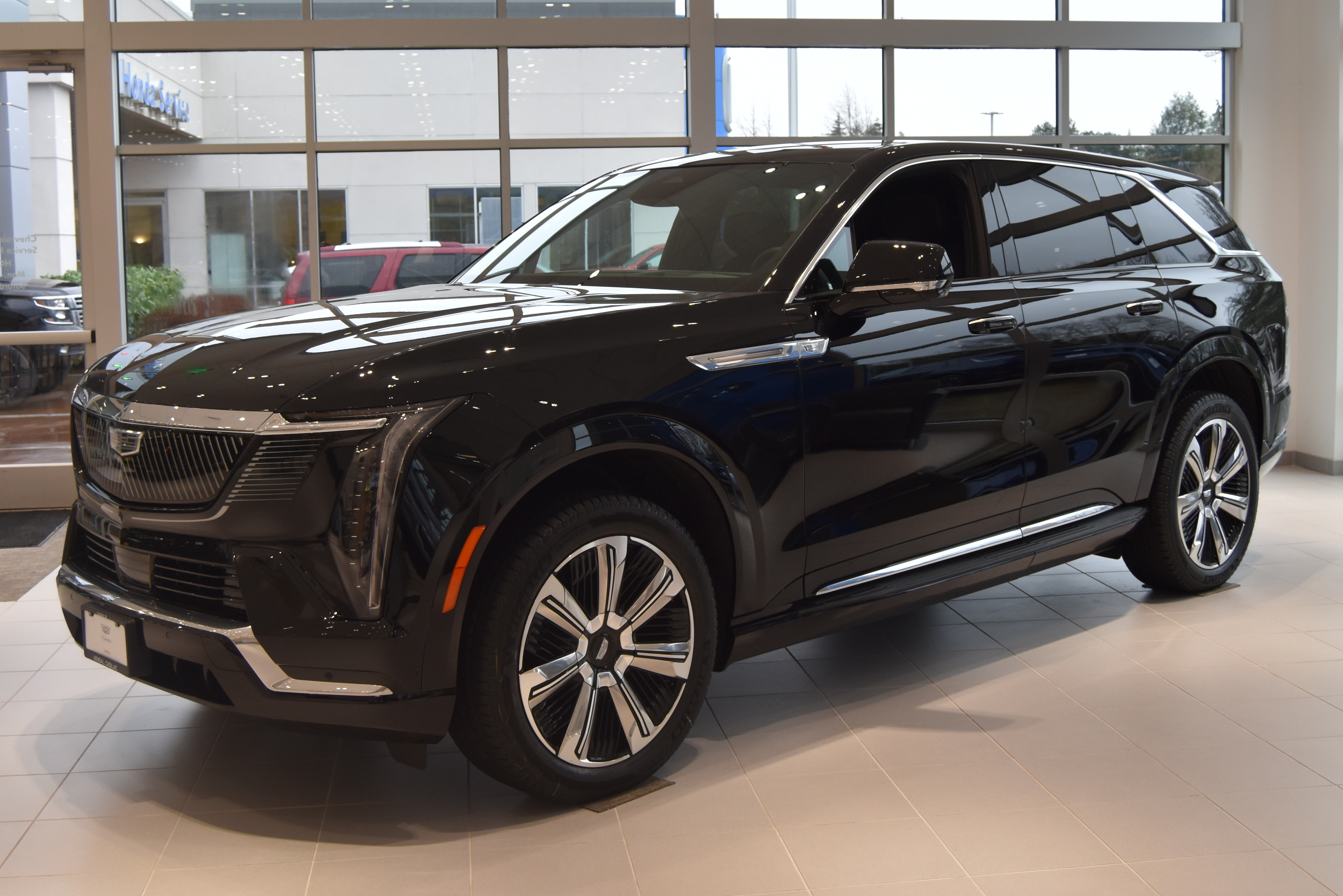
Cadillac Escalade IQ

=== Future models ===
- Chevrolet Tahoe EV / GMC Yukon EV (2026)
- Chevrolet Suburban EV / GMC Yukon XL EV (2026)

== See also ==
- General Motors BEV3 platform
- Ultium, the battery and motor used for the platform
