= Peacemakers International =

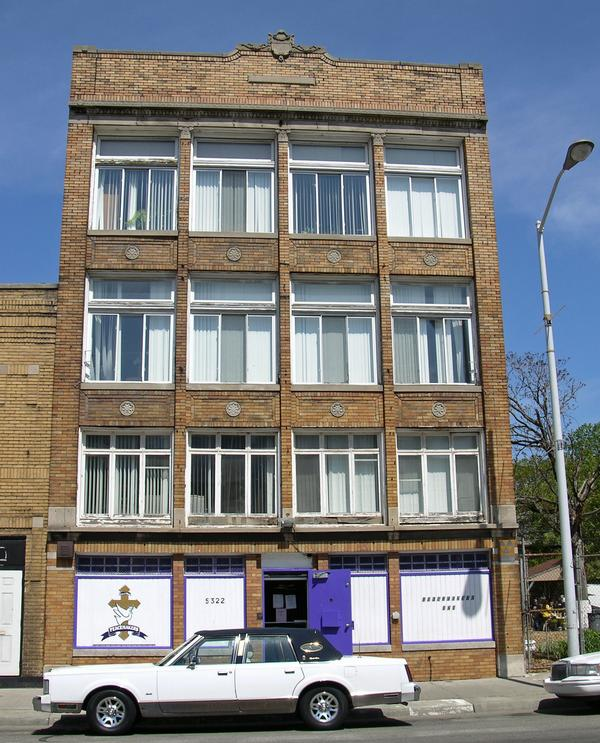
- Peacemakers International
- 42°22′06″N 83°02′32″W
- Location: 5322 Chene St. Poletown East, Detroit, MI
- Country: United States of America
- Website: peacemakersinternational.org

History
- Founded: 1994

Clergy
- Pastor: Steve Upshur

Peacemakers International is a Christian ministry located at 5322 Chene St. in the Poletown East neighborhood of Detroit, Michigan. Pastored by Detroit native Steve Upshur, Peacemakers International hosts church services on Sunday evenings with the help of praise and worship teams from churches across Southeast Michigan and puts the rest of its efforts into its outreach to the area's poor, maintaining a large community garden to provide fresh produce to those in need and operating the halfway houses, Jesus House and Mercy House.

== History ==
After living a life of crime and drug addiction in the city of Detroit, Steve Upshur converted to Christianity in 1974 after being introduced to the faith while on a trip to Oklahoma. After his conversion he returned to the city and began teaching Bible studies to the youth on Detroit’s east side. Over time, this ministry coalesced into a Church which would later be called "The Breadline."

In 1980 a decision was made to merge The Breadline with another group of Christians in the area. The end result was a new church equally pastored by three men: Tony Mancina, Bob Pannecouk, and Steve Upshur. They called their new ministry “New Life Fellowship Of Believers.” Before long they were able to obtain a new location for services in St. Clair Shores, Michigan.

Over the course of this ministry the men founded the “Zoe Christian Academy”, and Pastor Steve launched the “New Life” TV program which would go on to run for fifteen years. He also began to get more involved with prison and jail ministry, and began to minister to with outlaw motorcycle clubs, with his criminal past allowing him a higher level of credibility amongst these groups.

In the early 1990s Jim and Zilpha Fox, members of the New Life congregation, approached Pastor Steve and offered him a four story warehouse in the inner city of Detroit where they resided on the condition that it be used as a Christian ministry to serve the people of Detroit. In 1994 Pastor Steve accepted their offer and begin working on what would become Peacemakers International. Over time, as the property's restoration process continued and the “Chene St. Outreach Ministry” was founded. This new ministry started by on events on Saturdays to reach out to the community. Barbecues, campfires, and live music events were held and relationships in the community began to develop.

Eventually the Chene St. Outreach Ministry became so large that in 1997 Pastor Steve decided to leave his position at New Life and turned Chene St. Outreach Ministry into Peacemakers International which would serve as his full-time ministry. At the same time, Pastor Tony also left New Life to found the “Salt River Christian Church” in New Baltimore, and Pastor Bob stayed in St. Clair Shores to pastor the remaining congregants of New Life.

Since its founding Peacemakers International has opened community gardens, soup kitchens, halfway houses, and various other services to the poor, with the hope to continue these services through the future while serving as an important piece of Detroit's revitalization.
