= Poletown East, Detroit =

Human settlement in Detroit, Michigan, US

Coordinates: 42.3687°N 83.0476°W

Poletown East is a neighborhood of Detroit, Michigan, bordering the enclave city of Hamtramck. The area was named after the Polish immigrants who originally lived in the area. A portion of residential area known as Poletown became the General Motors Detroit/Hamtramck Assembly plant in 1981 with those residents relocated by General Motors and the cities of Detroit and Hamtramck which claimed eminent domain in order to make way for a new automobile plant.

== Geography ==
The boundaries of Poletown East as defined by the city's planning and development department sets the statistical neighborhood's boundaries as I-94 and the city of Hamtramck's southern boundary to the north, I-75 to the west, Warren Avenue to the south, and Mt. Elliot Street to the east.

West of St. Aubin and south of I-94, as well as well as the area north of I-94 between St. Aubin and Mt. Elliott, are industrial in nature. The area bound by St. Aubin, I-94, Mt. Elliott and Warren is largely residential.

The boundaries of historical Poletown included the city of Hamtramck, Gratiot Avenue, and a line from Mt. Elliott to the intersection of Canfield and St. Antoine, the location of the Detroit Medical Center.

== History ==
Poletown was settled in the 1870s when the first waves of Polish and Kashubian immigrants came to Detroit, and served as the heart of Detroit's Polish community for many years. The nucleus of the community was the St. Albertus Roman Catholic Church, which opened in 1871 and closed in 1990. Poletown experienced its greatest period of growth during the 1920s and 1930s as thousands of Polish immigrants came to Detroit in search of jobs in auto plants, like the nearby Packard Plant, and the Chrysler Plant to the east on Jefferson Ave, and the slaughterhouses that were in the area. Poletown was not only home to Poles, but also to Italians and African Americans. During the 1950s and 1960s, freeway construction and urban renewal projects altered the neighborhood.

In 1981, a portion of the neighborhood was demolished to make way for the construction of the General Motors Detroit/Hamtramck Assembly plant. General Motors and the cities of Detroit and Hamtramck relied on eminent domain to relocate the 4,200 people who lived in the area, along with their 1,300 homes, 140 businesses, six churches and one hospital. The plant was built at the boundary of Hamtramck and Detroit as a BOC factory (Buick-Oldsmobile-Cadillac) and became known as the "Poletown Plant".

Coleman Young, Mayor of Detroit, used eminent domain to seize the portion of Poletown. Critics stated that Young could have chosen other areas for the plant and yet he chose one of the final remaining working class White areas of Detroit. Young had criticized the destruction of the Black Bottom through eminent domain.

Some of the displaced residents sued the cities and General Motors, but the Michigan Supreme Court ruled that economic development was a legitimate use of eminent domain. Another Poletown group, the Citizens District Council, supported the efforts to build the new plant. Gary Campbell, a Poletown resident and bar owner, accused those opposing the new plant of presenting opinions of a small minority as if they represented the entire neighborhood. The controversy led to national news attention and the involvement of Ralph Nader and the Gray Panthers. Protests centered on Immaculate Conception Roman Catholic Church. The regional Catholic Archdiocese supported the relocations and had already agreed to sell the two Catholic churches that were in the area. However, Joseph Karasiewicz, the priest at one of the parishes, defied his archbishop and fought to keep his building from being sold. The Archdiocese stood firm in its support of the sale. A 29-day sit-in at the Immaculate Conception Church came to an end on July 14, 1981, when police forcibly evicted 20 people from the church. Twelve people were arrested, only three of the twelve arrested were from Poletown.

Poletown Neighborhood Council v. Detroit became a landmark case for "public use" eminent domain matters. Twenty-three years later, the Michigan Supreme Court reversed the precedent that it had set in the earlier case. In their 2004 decision, County of Wayne v. Hathcock a property owner near Detroit's Metropolitan Airport successfully fought against the development of a new suburban office/industrial park. The case was argued by Michigan eminent domain attorney Alan T. Ackerman. In a later 2005 United States Supreme Court decision, the case of Kelo v. City of New London ruled that the use of eminent domain to promote economic development is constitutional, but the opinion in Kelo cites the Hathcock decision as an example of how states may choose to impose their own restrictions on the taking of property.

== Other uses ==
Poletown is sometimes used inclusively as slang for Hamtramck, Michigan, probably due to Hamtramck's strong identification with Polish-Americans. "Poletown" proper is the section immediately south of Hamtramck within the city of Detroit, but at one time had a strong and vibrant Polish neighborhood. Hamtramck itself has become highly diverse and there is still a small Polish-speaking minority. Polish bakeries and restaurants there are particularly popular, especially around Fat Tuesday. Many people around the city celebrate Fat Tuesday by eating pączki (singular form: pączek), even if they are not Polish.

== See also ==
- Brightmoor
- Detroit
- History of the Polish Americans in Metro Detroit
- Peacemakers International
