= Cadillac Escalade IQ =

Luxury electric SUV by Cadillac

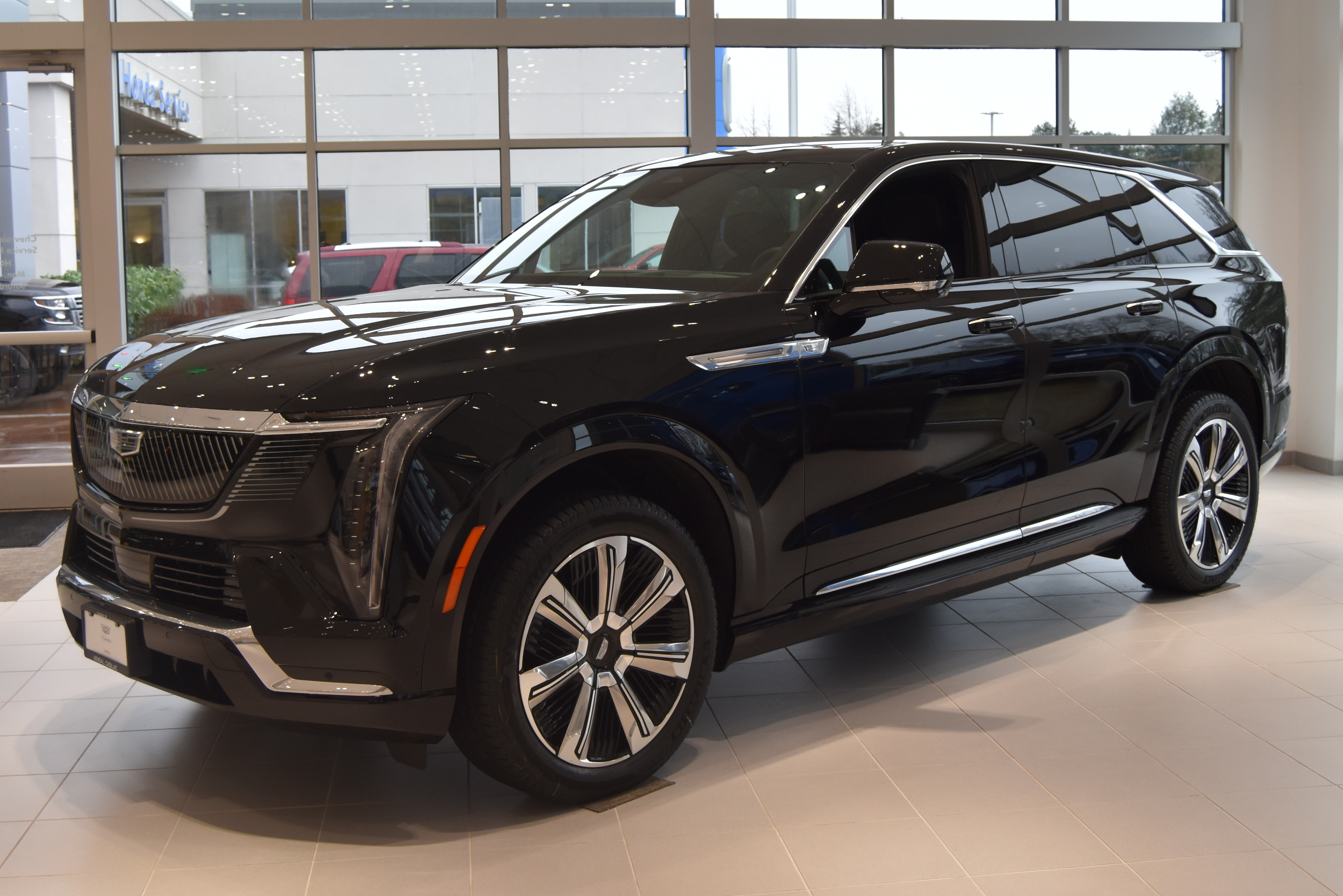

Overview
- Manufacturer: Cadillac (General Motors)
- Production: 2024–present
- Model years: 2025–present
- Assembly: United States: Detroit, Michigan (Detroit/Hamtramck Assembly)
- Designer: Robin Krieg

Body and chassis
- Class: Full-size luxury SUV
- Body style: 5-door SUV
- Layout: Dual-motors, all-wheel drive
- Platform: GM BT1
- Chassis: Unibody
- Related: GMC Hummer EV

Powertrain
- Electric motor: Dual "Ultium Drive" permanent magnet motors
- Power output: 750 hp (560 kW; 760 PS) "Velocity Max" mode; 680 hp (510 kW; 690 PS) standard mode
- Battery: 24 module: 233.3/205 kWh (total/usable) "Ultium" lithium-ion, typically 400 V with ability to switch to 800 V when charging
- Electric range: 450 mi (720 km) (est)
- Plug-in charging: 19.2 kW (AC); 350 kW (DC)

Dimensions
- Wheelbase: 136.2 in (3,459 mm)
- Length: 224.3 in (5,697 mm); 228.5 in (5,804 mm) (IQL)
- Width: 85.3 in (2,167 mm)
- Height: 76.1 in (1,933 mm)
- Curb weight: 9,000–9,350 lb (4,082–4,241 kg)

The Cadillac Escalade IQ is a full-size battery-electric luxury SUV manufactured by General Motors and marketed by Cadillac as an electric counterpart to the gas-powered Escalade. Introduced in 2024 and built on General Motors’ Ultium electric vehicle platform, the Escalade IQ is produced at GM’s Factory Zero assembly plant in Detroit.

== Overview ==
GM first announced the Cadillac Escalade IQ in May 2023 as a battery-electric version of the full-size sport utility vehicle. Details were released at a New York City press event on August 9, 2023. The Escalade IQ began production at Detroit/Hamtramck Assembly in late 2024 for the 2025 model year. A variant with an extended length, known as the Escalade IQL, has been released in 2025 to correspond to the Escalade ESV. GM previously had trademarked the names "Escalade IQ" and "Escalade IQL" in 2021. The Escalade IQ/IQL is the first electric Cadillac intended to replace an existing model powered by internal combustion engines.

The Escalade IQ is based on GM's Ultium technology, sharing batteries, motors, and other components with the GMC Hummer EV, Chevrolet Silverado EV, and Cruise Origin. The 24-module battery has a storage capacity of more than 200 kW-hr, giving it a driving range of 450 mi (720 km). Peak charging rate is 350 kW using an 800 V DC source; there is an onboard AC charger with a maximum input capacity of 19.2 kW.

The dual-motor, all-wheel-drive Escalade IQ is equipped with two output modes: the standard output mode peaks at a combined 680 hp (510 kW; 690 PS) and 615 lb⋅ft (834 N⋅m) of torque, while "Velocity Max" increases output to 750 hp (560 kW; 760 PS) and 785 lb⋅ft (1,064 N⋅m) of torque. The rear wheels are linked to the steering wheel, turning up to 10 degrees either opposite (at low speeds) or in the same direction as the front wheels (at highway speeds) and permitting diagonal travel similar to the Hummer EV's "crabwalk" mode.

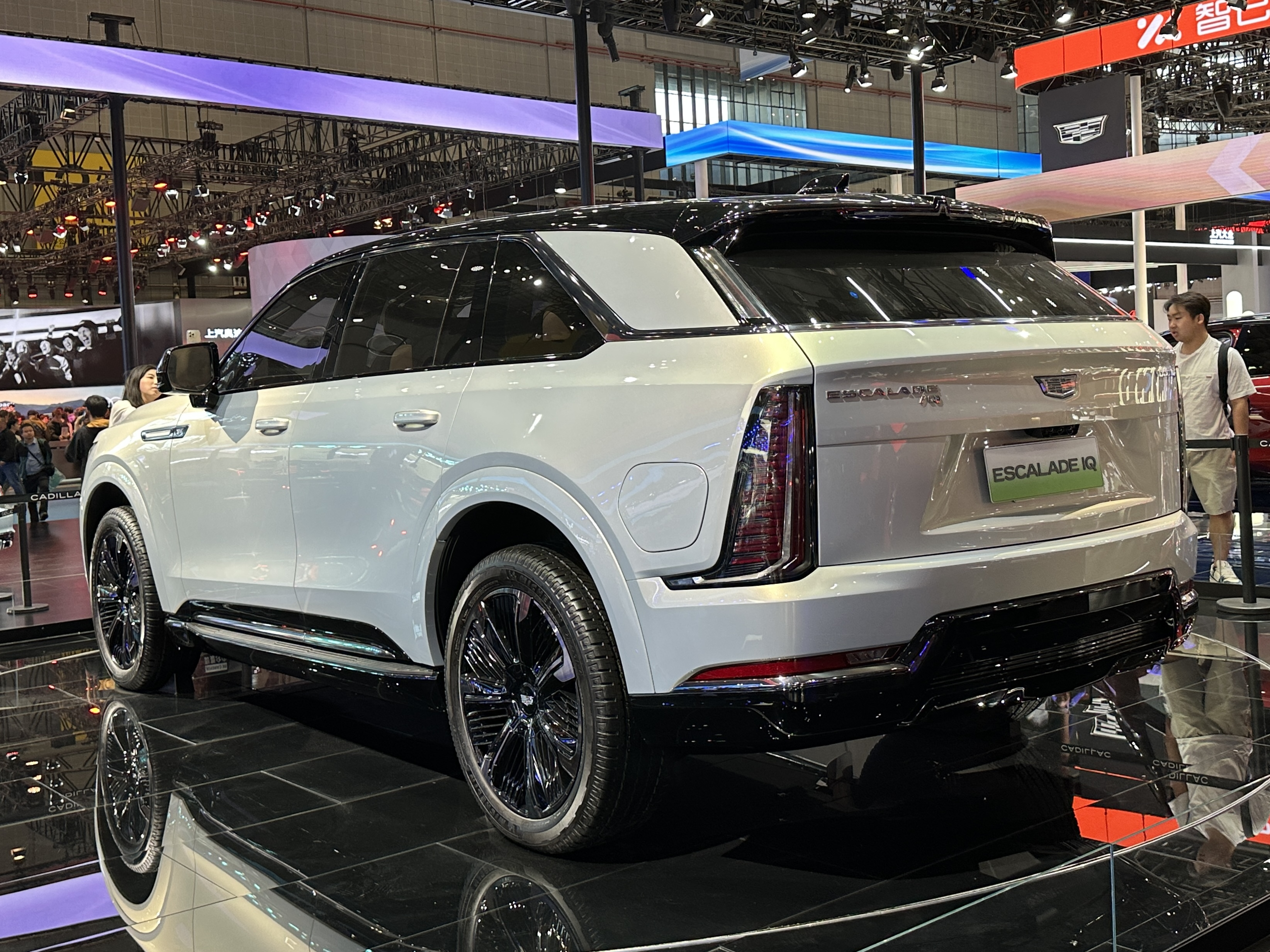
Rear view

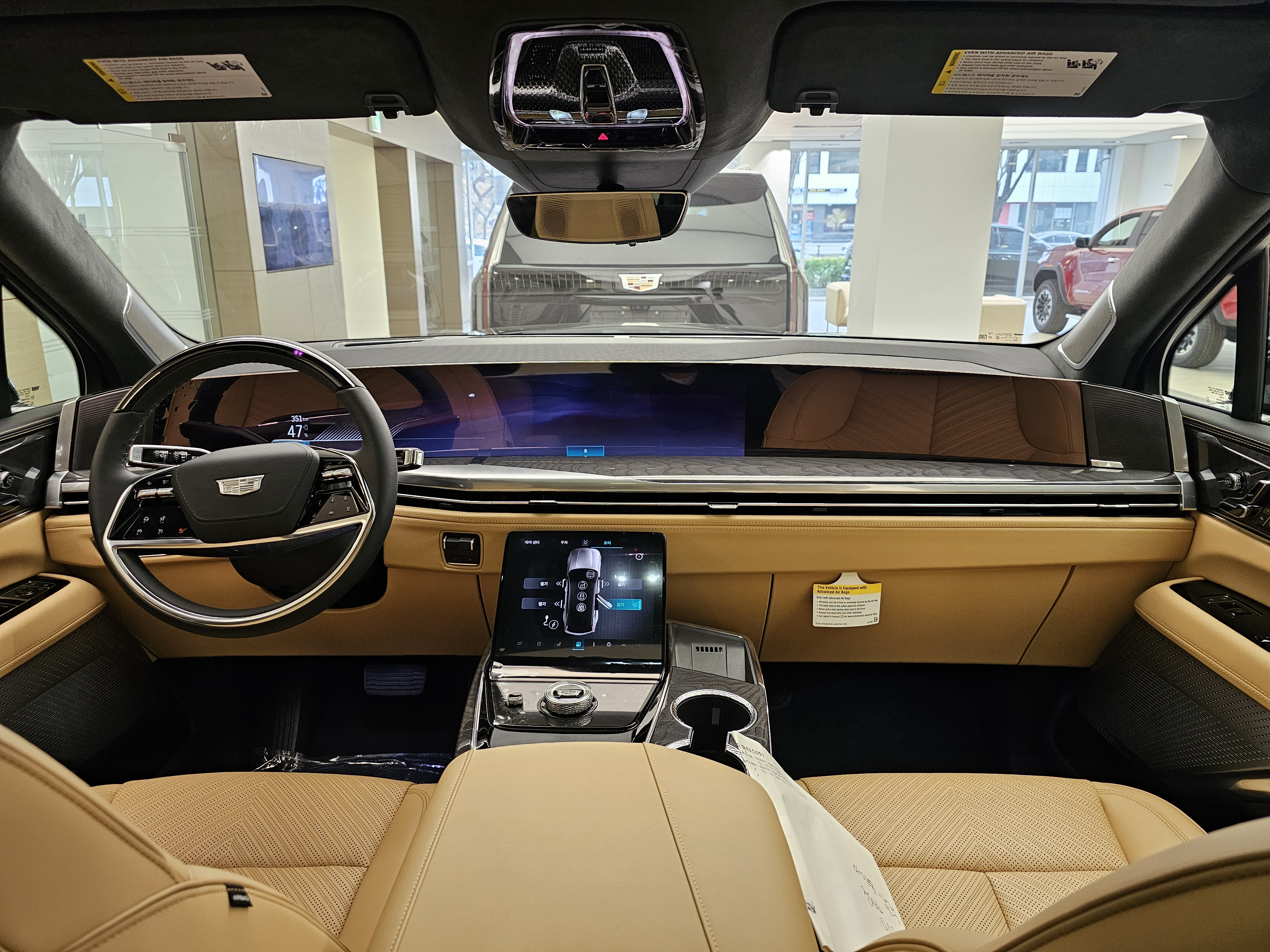
Interior

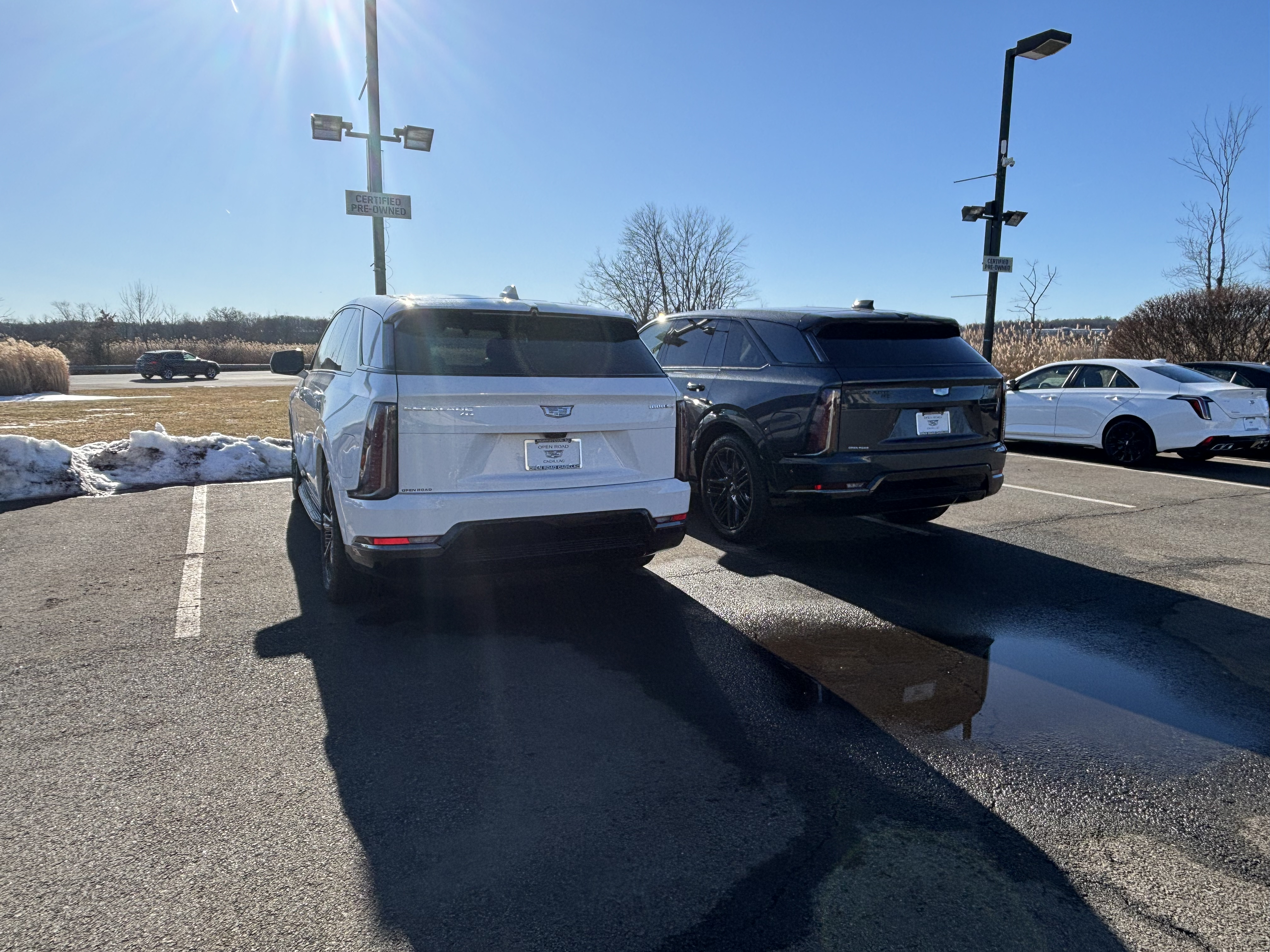
White and Black Escalade IQs

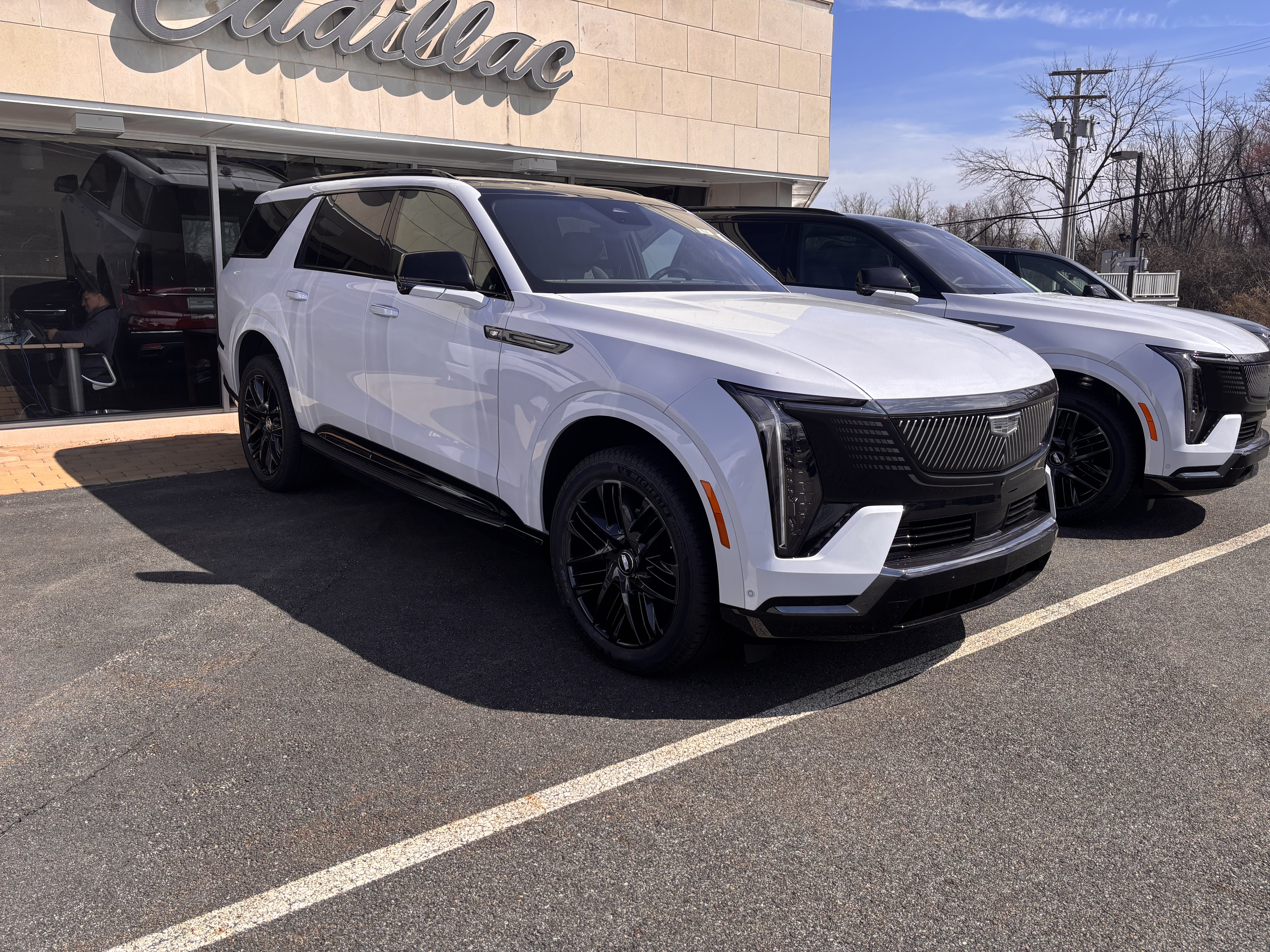
Cadillac Escalade IQL

== Sales ==
| Year | US |
|---|---|
| 2024 | 670 |
| 2025 | 8,115 |
