= Chevrolet Silverado EV =

Battery electric pickup truck

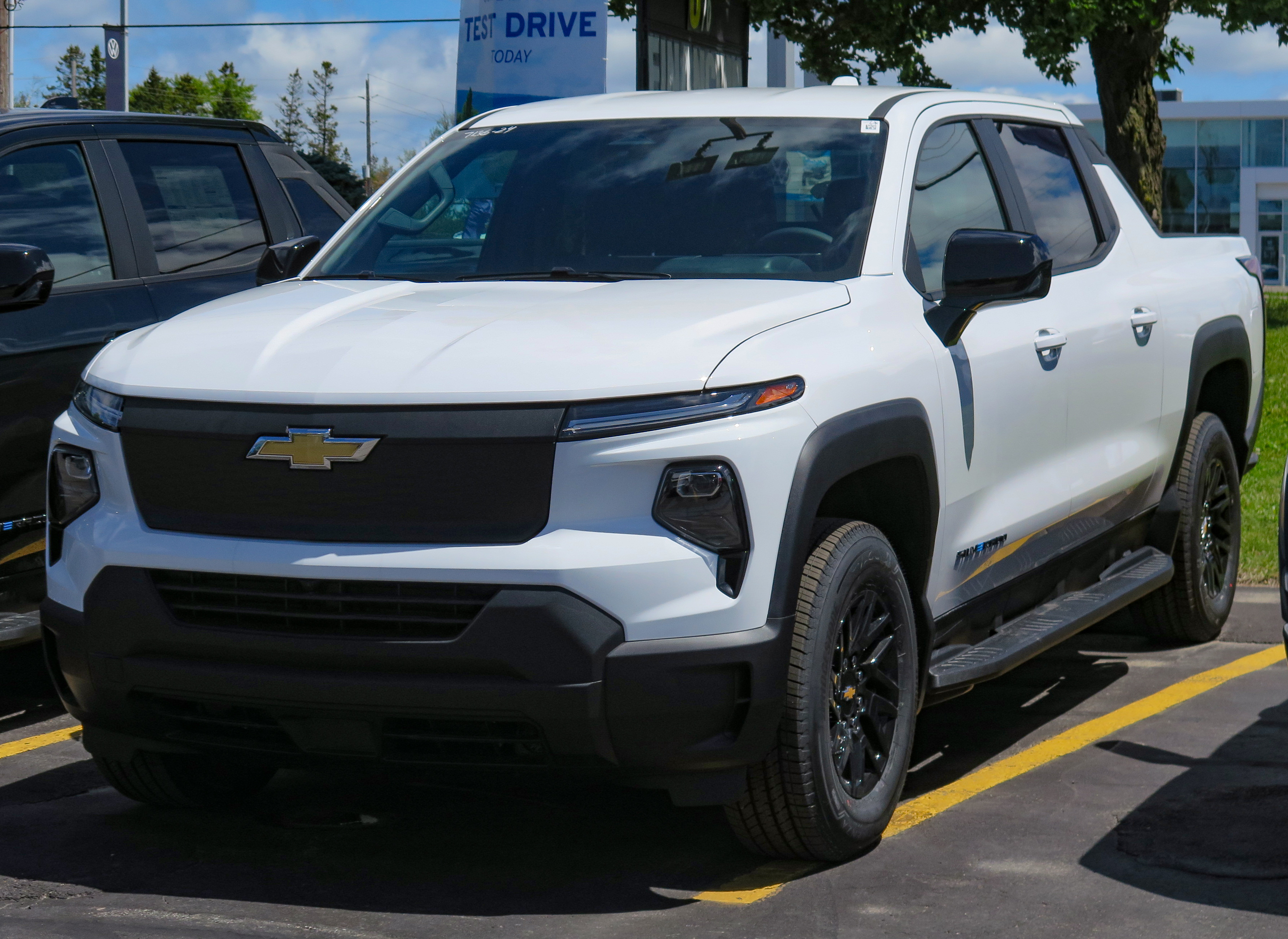

Overview
- Manufacturer: General Motors
- Also called: GMC Sierra EV
- Production: May 2023–present
- Model years: 2024–present
- Assembly: United States: Detroit, Michigan (Detroit/Hamtramck Assembly)
- Designer: Raphael Molina, Jacky Zhan, Nichole Krantz

Body and chassis
- Class: Full-size pickup truck
- Body style: 4-door pickup truck
- Layout: Dual-motor, rear-wheel-drive; Dual-motor, four-wheel-drive
- Platform: GM BT1
- Chassis: Unibody
- Related: GMC Hummer EV; Cadillac Escalade IQ

Powertrain
- Electric motor: Dual permanent magnet motors E-4WD
- Hybrid drivetrain: 400 V (switches to series 800 V when charging)
- Battery: 119 kWh (Standard Range) Ultium lithium-ion 170 kWh (Extended Range) Ultium lithium-ion 205 kWh (Max Range) Ultium lithium-ion
- Electric range: 493 mi (793 km) (WT Max); 283 mi (455 km) (LT Std.); 450 mi (720 km) (4WT); 393 mi (632 km) (3WT); 440 mi (710 km) (RST)
- Plug-in charging: 350 kW, 800 V DC; 19.2 kW AC; V2L: 7.2 kW (Standard model) or 10.2 kW (PowerBase with Ultium Power Bar)

Dimensions
- Wheelbase: 145.7 in (3,701 mm)
- Length: 233.1 in (5,921 mm)
- Width: 81.6–83.8 in (2,073–2,129 mm)
- Height: 78.0–78.7 in (1,981–1,999 mm)
- Curb weight: 8,532 lb (3,870 kg) (4WT)

The Chevrolet Silverado EV is a battery electric full-size pickup truck manufactured by General Motors under the Chevrolet brand. Introduced in January 2022, the Silverado EV went on sale in 2023 for the 2024 model year in the North American market.

Despite using the Silverado nameplate, the vehicle does not share its underpinnings with the ICE-powered Silverado, as it is built on a narrower version of the dedicated electric platform used by the GMC Hummer EV. The Silverado EV is the first Chevrolet-branded electric pickup truck since the experimental S-10 EV and VIA VTRUX.

The GMC counterpart, the GMC Sierra EV, was introduced in October 2022 with a restyled exterior and interior design.

== Overview ==
The Silverado EV was introduced at the 2022 Consumer Electronics Show (CES) on January 5, 2022. Instead of using the existing Silverado platform, it uses the electric-only BT1 platform with an Ultium battery. While the wheelbase and overall length are similar to the ICE-powered Silverado, the proportions are significantly altered which enables it to adopt a more aerodynamic exterior design and a forward-shifted cab to increase interior space. It is available in a four-door Crew Cab configuration.

All models are powered by front and rear electric motors with optional 200 kWh battery and uses independent front and rear suspension. The truck will initially have a towing capacity of 8,000 lb (3,629 kg), but Chevrolet will offer a max tow package that will increase the figure up to 20,000 lb (9,072 kg).

The truck features a midgate which is similar to the one in the Avalanche, which allows the wall separating the bed from the cab to be lowered in a 60:40 split to increase the effective bed length while leaving room for a rear passenger. The rear glass is removable and can be stored in the folding section, further enlarging the opening. Combined with the tailgate, the 5.9-foot (1.8 m) long bed is extendable to 10 feet 10 inches (3.3 meters). The front hood hosts a front trunk capable of handling three large suitcases.

Production started at the Factory Zero assembly plant (formerly Detroit/Hamtramck Assembly) in the second quarter of 2023, in limited numbers for fleet and commercial customers only. Both fleet and retail production are expected to ramp up in 2024. Additional production at the Orion Assembly plant in Michigan is expected to begin in late 2025.

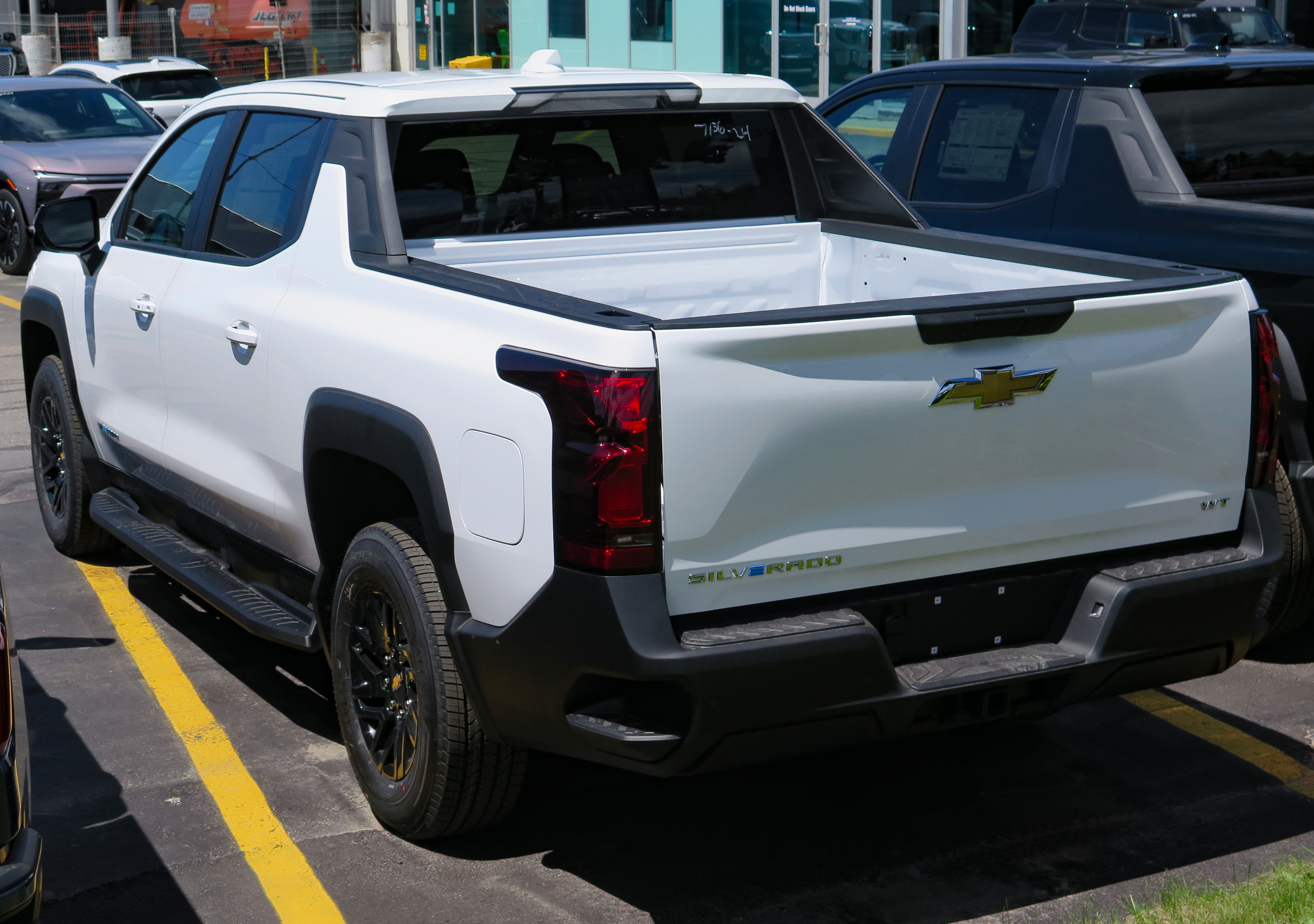
Rear view

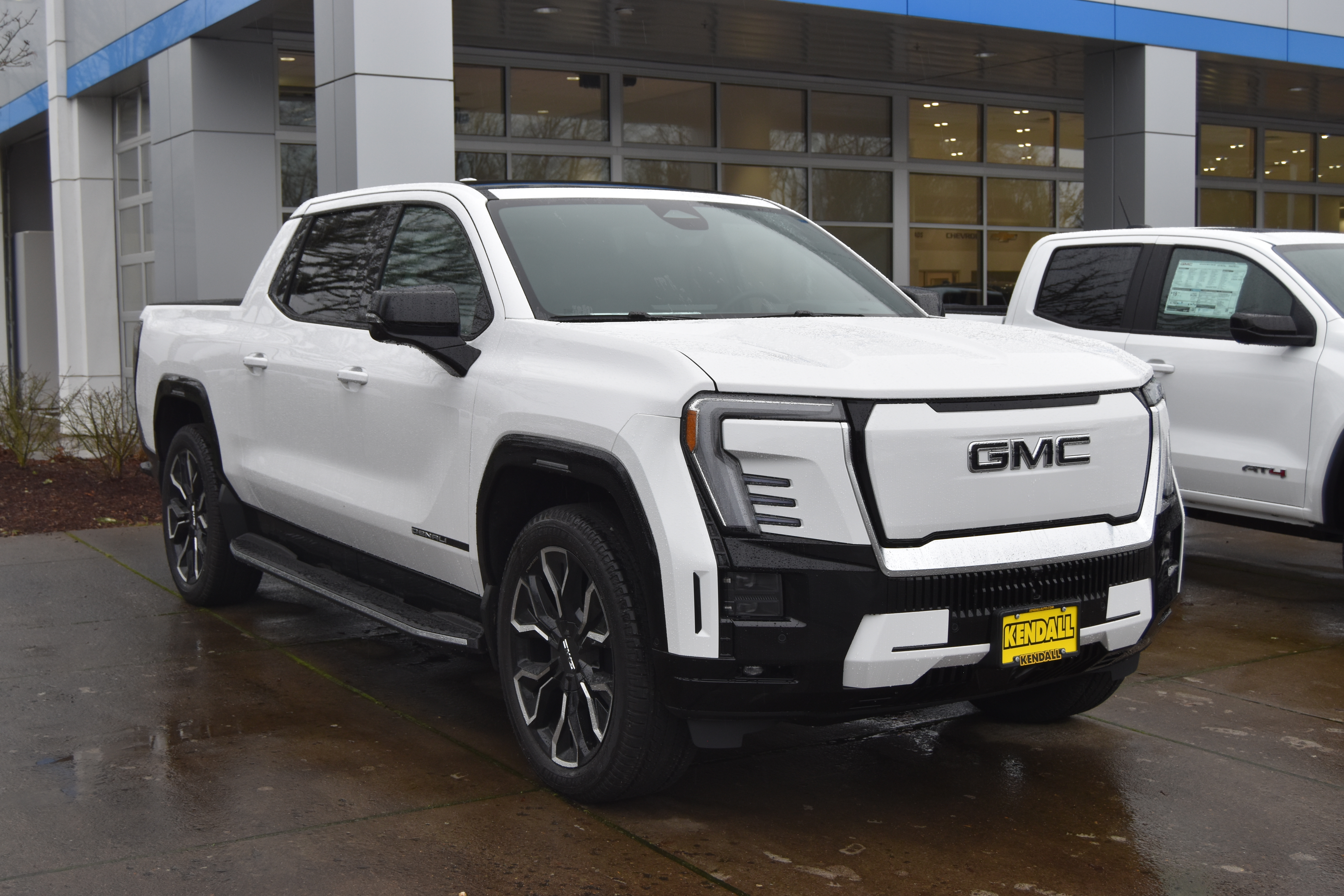
GMC Sierra EV Denali

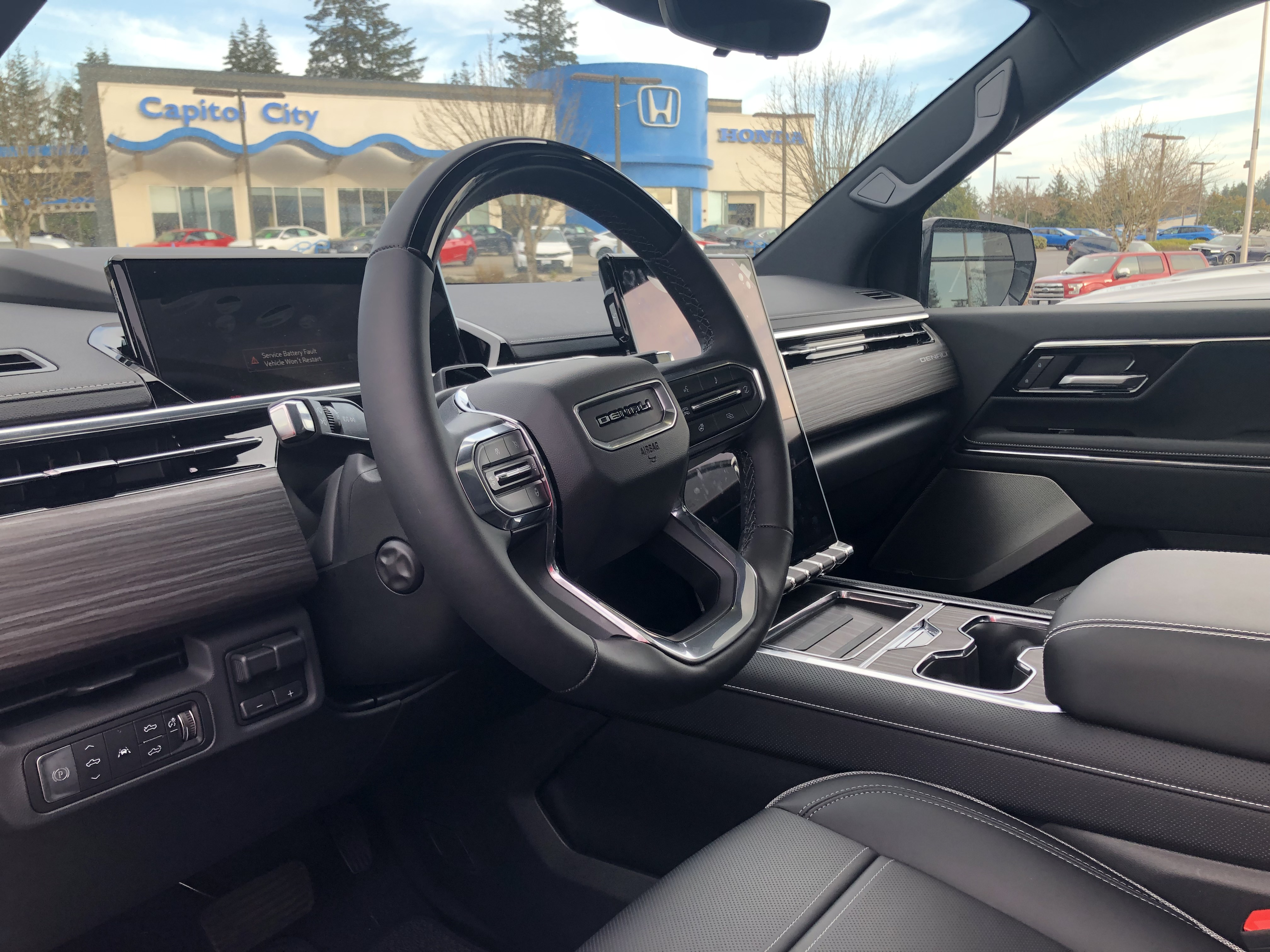
Interior (Sierra EV)

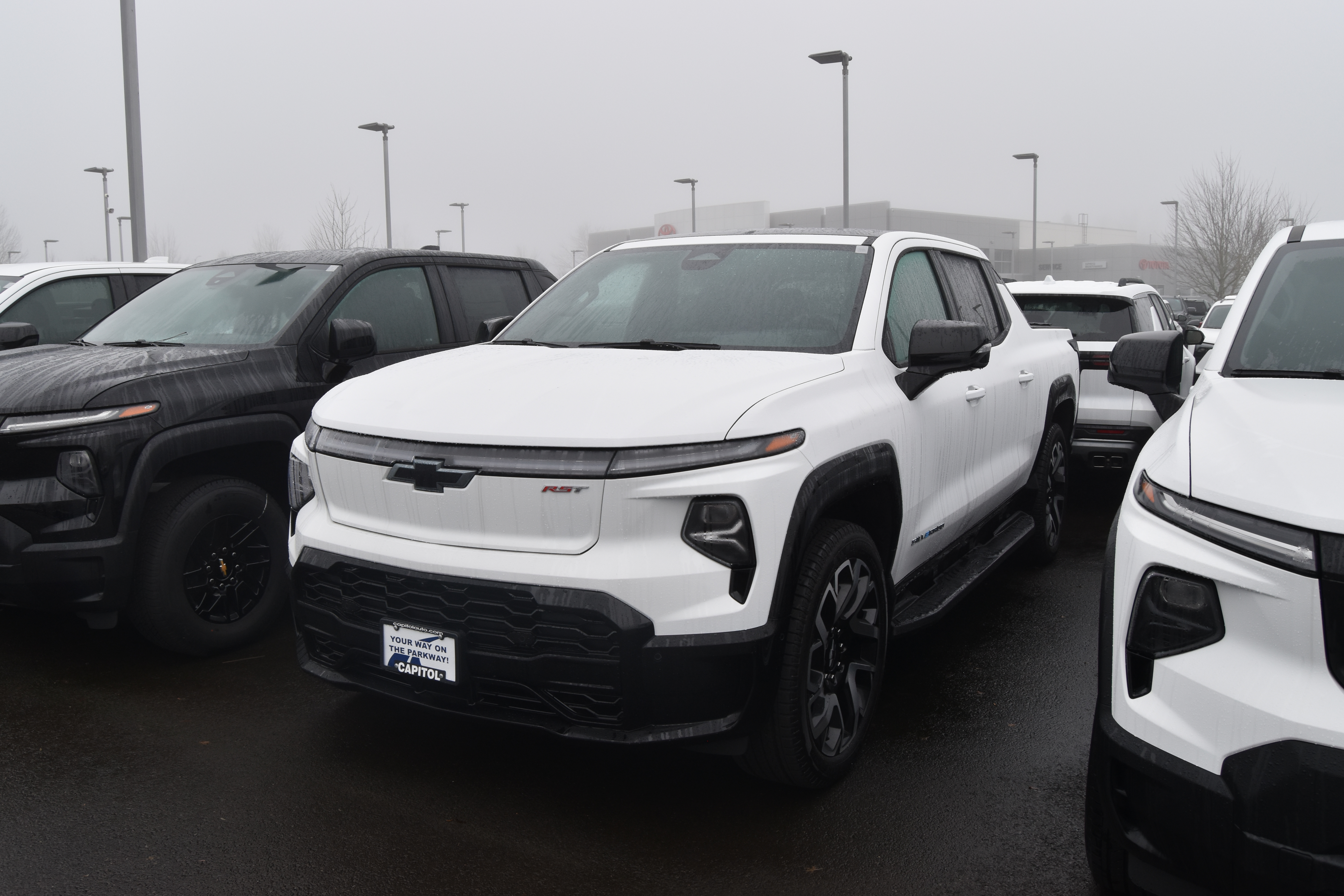
2024 Chevrolet Silverado EV RST Front View

== Trim levels ==
Two trim levels were available at its introduction, both for the fleet-oriented work truck: 3WT and 4WT. The flagship RST First Edition debut in mid-2024. Additional trim levels, such as the off-road oriented Trail Boss, were released later. The WT has a power output of 510 hp (517 PS; 380 kW) and 615 lb⋅ft (834 N⋅m; 85.0 kg⋅m) of torque, while the RST offers a power output of 664 hp (673 PS; 495 kW) and 780 lb⋅ft (1,060 N⋅m; 108 kg⋅m).

The WT trim features a more basic appearance, silver-painted steel wheels, black front and rear bumpers and exterior accents, and a vinyl interior with rubberized floors, while the RST features a sporty appearance with large aluminum-alloy wheels, color-keyed front and rear bumpers and exterior accents, a luxury leather-trimmed interior, and carpeted flooring with front and rear floor mats. Both models include a touchscreen infotainment system with Apple CarPlay and Android Auto smartphone integration, as well as a large Thin Film Transistor (TFT) reconfigurable LCD full-color instrument cluster display screen. Also standard on both models are LED front headlamps and a dual-zone automatic climate control system.

The RST First Edition trim features a drive mode called Wide Open Watts, that enables 0–100 km/h (0–62 mph) time in less than 4.5 seconds. It also will come equipped with 24-inch wheels, four-wheel steering, an adaptive air suspension that can raise or lower the model up to 2 in (51 mm), and a Super Cruise semi-autonomous driving system. GM expects about 440 miles of range on a full charge for the RST.

== Sales ==
Calendar year	Silverado EV		Sierra EV	
Calendar year	US	Canada	US	Canada
2023	461		—N/a	—N/a
2024	7,428	1,938	1,788	276
2025	11,275	2,756	7,996	1,438
