= GMC Hummer EV =

Battery electric pickup truck and SUV

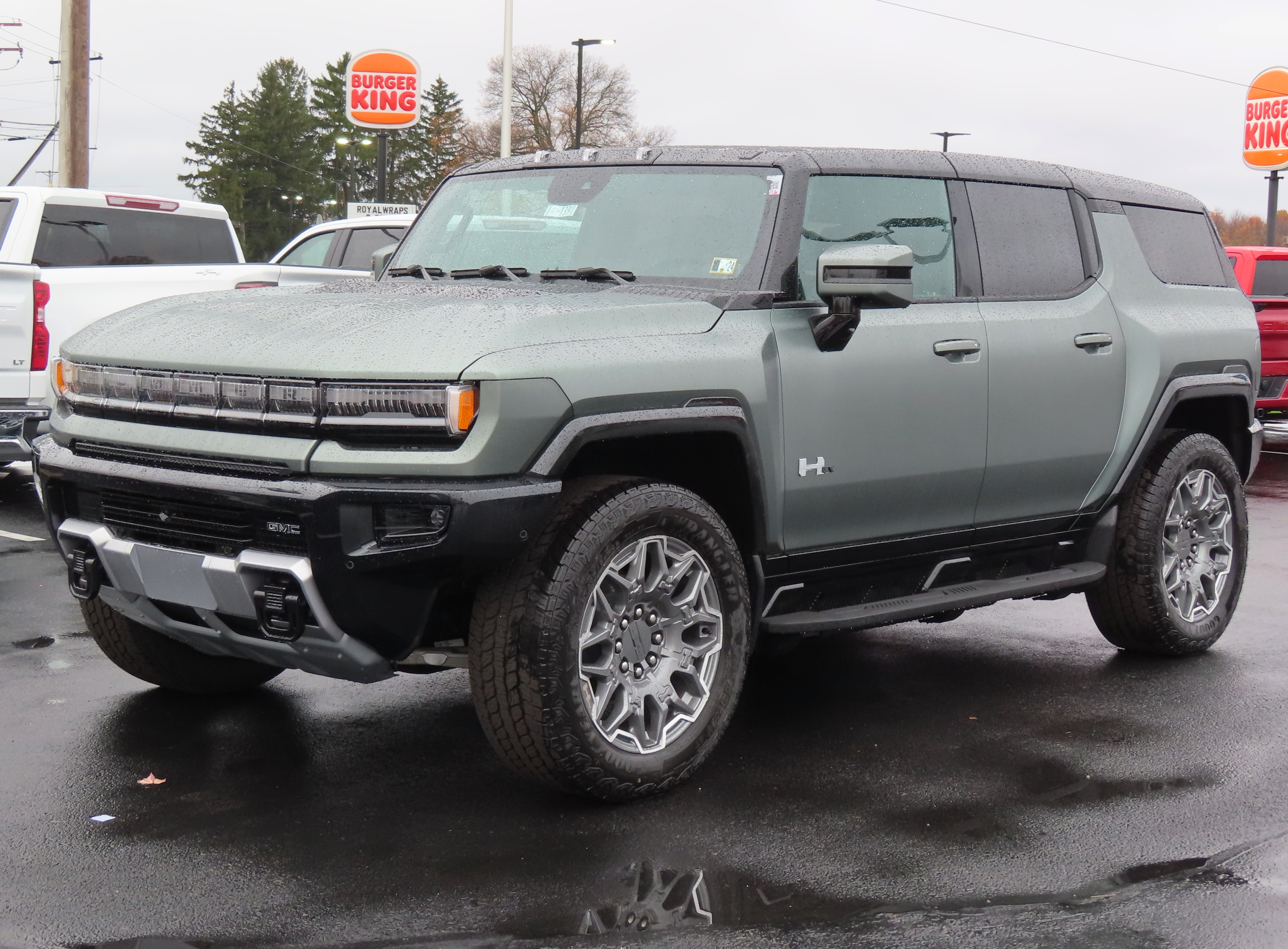
- 2024 GMC Hummer EV3X (SUV)

Overview
- Manufacturer: GMC (General Motors)
- Production: November 2021 – present
- Model years: 2022–present
- Assembly: United States: Detroit, Michigan (Detroit/Hamtramck Assembly)
- Designer: Rick Scheer (director of design); Brett Goliff (interior); Scott Martin (UX); Samir Datta (lighting)

Body and chassis
- Class: Full-size SUV; Full-size pickup truck
- Body style: 4-door pickup truck 5-door SUV
- Layout: Dual-motors, rear-wheel drive (Hummer EV2); Dual- or tri-motors, all-wheel drive (Hummer EV2X and EV3X)
- Platform: GM BT1
- Chassis: Unibody
- Related: Chevrolet Silverado EV; Cadillac Escalade IQ

Powertrain
- Electric motor: Dual or triple "Ultium Drive" permanent magnet motors
- Power output: EV3X: 830 or 1,000 hp EV2 and EV2X: 625 hp Edition 1: 1,000 hp (746 kW; 1,014 PS) (some figures are pre-production manufacturer estimates)
- Transmission: Single-speed
- Battery: 24 module: 246.8/212.7 kWh (total/usable) "Ultium" lithium-ion, typically 400 V with ability to switch to 800 V when charging 20 module: c. 170 kWh Li-ion
- Electric range: 298–381 mi (480–613 km)
- Plug-in charging: 19.2 kW (AC); 350 kW (DC)

Dimensions
- Wheelbase: 135.6 in (3,444 mm) (Truck); 126.7 in (3,218 mm) (SUV)
- Length: 216.8 in (5,507 mm) (Truck); 196.8 in (4,999 mm) (SUV)
- Width: 86.7 in (2,202 mm) (Truck); 86.46 in (2,196 mm) (SUV)
- Height: 79.1 in (2,009 mm) (Truck); 77.8 in (1,976 mm) (SUV)
- Curb weight: Edition 1: 9,640 lb (4,373 kg)

Chronology
- Predecessor: Hummer H2 & Hummer H2 SUT

The GMC Hummer EV (badged as H_{EV}) is a line of battery electric heavy-duty vehicles produced by General Motors since 2021, and sold under the GMC marque. The Hummer EV is offered in two variants: a pickup truck and a sport utility vehicle (SUV), unveiled in October 2020 and April 2021 respectively.

Weighing roughly 10,000 pounds (4,500 kg), the Hummer EV is among the heaviest consumer automobiles currently sold in the United States. Its size, mass, and acceleration have led to concerns regarding the danger it poses to other users on the road in the event of a collision, as well as its efficiency and environmental effects.

== Overview ==
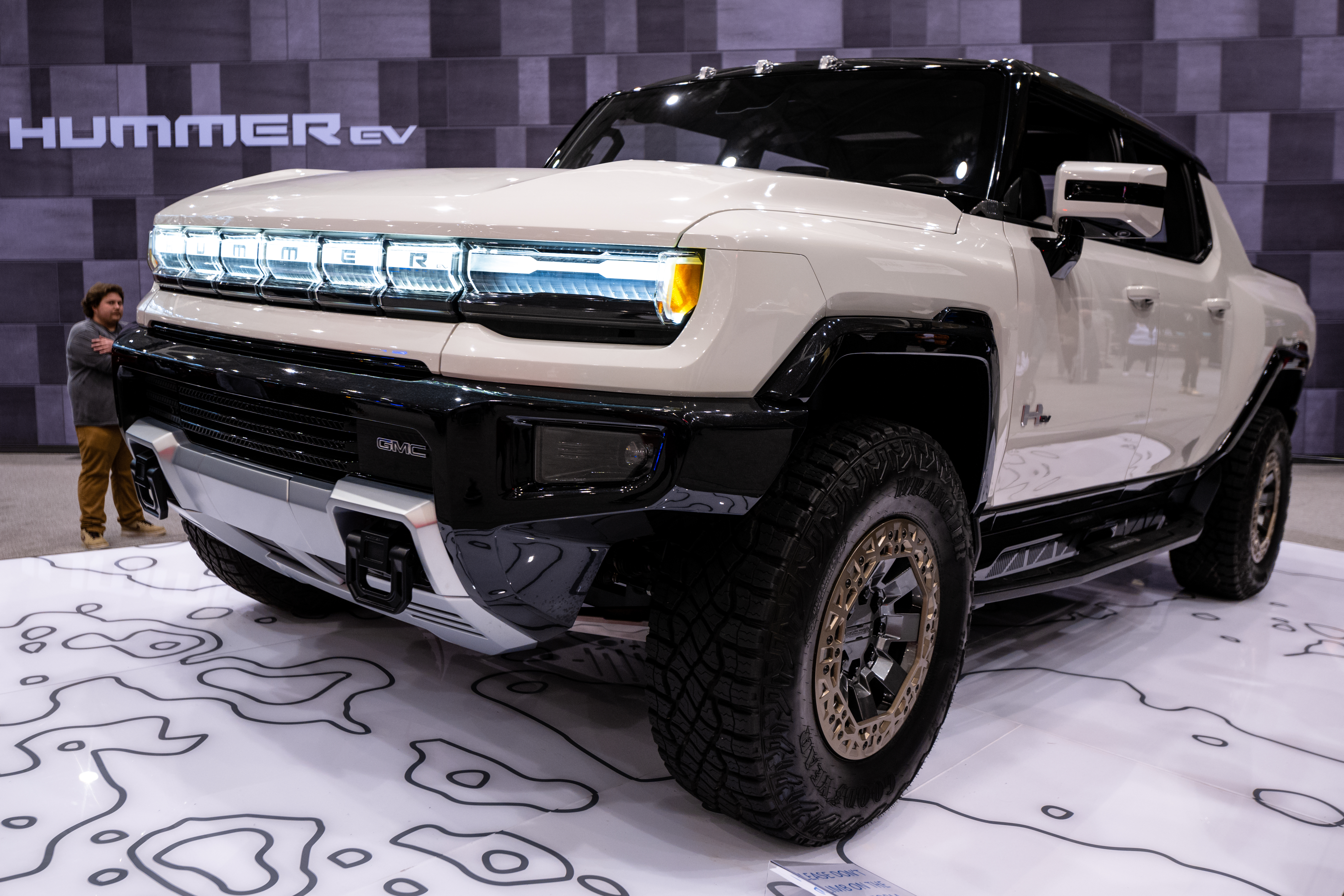
Hummer EV Truck in Arctic White

The Hummer EV is assembled in Detroit and uses batteries produced by LG Chem in South Korea, with plans later to start producing batteries in the U.S. It is planned for SUV models produced from 2024 onward to be equipped to charge other electric vehicles using an onboard 19.2 kW charger.

The electric motors' torque profile make it suitable for towing trailers. It includes various options, such as cameras that allow the driver to see underneath it and four-wheel steering. The SUV variant is rated to tow up to 7,500 pounds (3,400 kg) and seats five passengers with 35.9 cubic feet (1,020 L) of cargo space behind the rear seats and 81.8 cubic feet (2,320 L) with the back seats folded down.

The pickup truck variant has a longer wheelbase than the SUV. The pickup variant has a 5-foot (1.5 m) high bed with a payload capacity of 1,300 pounds (590 kg) as well as a 11.3-cubic-foot (320 L) front trunk. The front trunk on both models is also intended to store the four removable roof panels when needed. It has eighteen cameras installed, as well as front-and-rear pedestrian alerts designed to aid drivers' situational awareness. These accompany numerous other driver-assistance features such as automatic braking and blind-spot warnings.

It weighs 4.5 short tons (4.1 t), with the battery weighing almost 3,000 pounds (1,400 kg). With a gross vehicle weight rating of 10,400 pounds (4,700 kg), it is classified as a class 3 medium-duty truck in the United States.

=== Origins ===
The GMC Hummer EV originated from the discontinued Hummer brand that was founded by AM General, the manufacturer of the original HMMWV (colloquial: Humvee) light military vehicle that was later adapted to civilian spec and sold to the public as the Hummer H1. In 1999, General Motors purchased the rights to the Hummer name and began marketing it as a full-fledged brand with a lineup that eventually included the Hummer H2 and Hummer H3. The Hummer brand was discontinued in 2010 following the General Motors bankruptcy.

== Trims ==
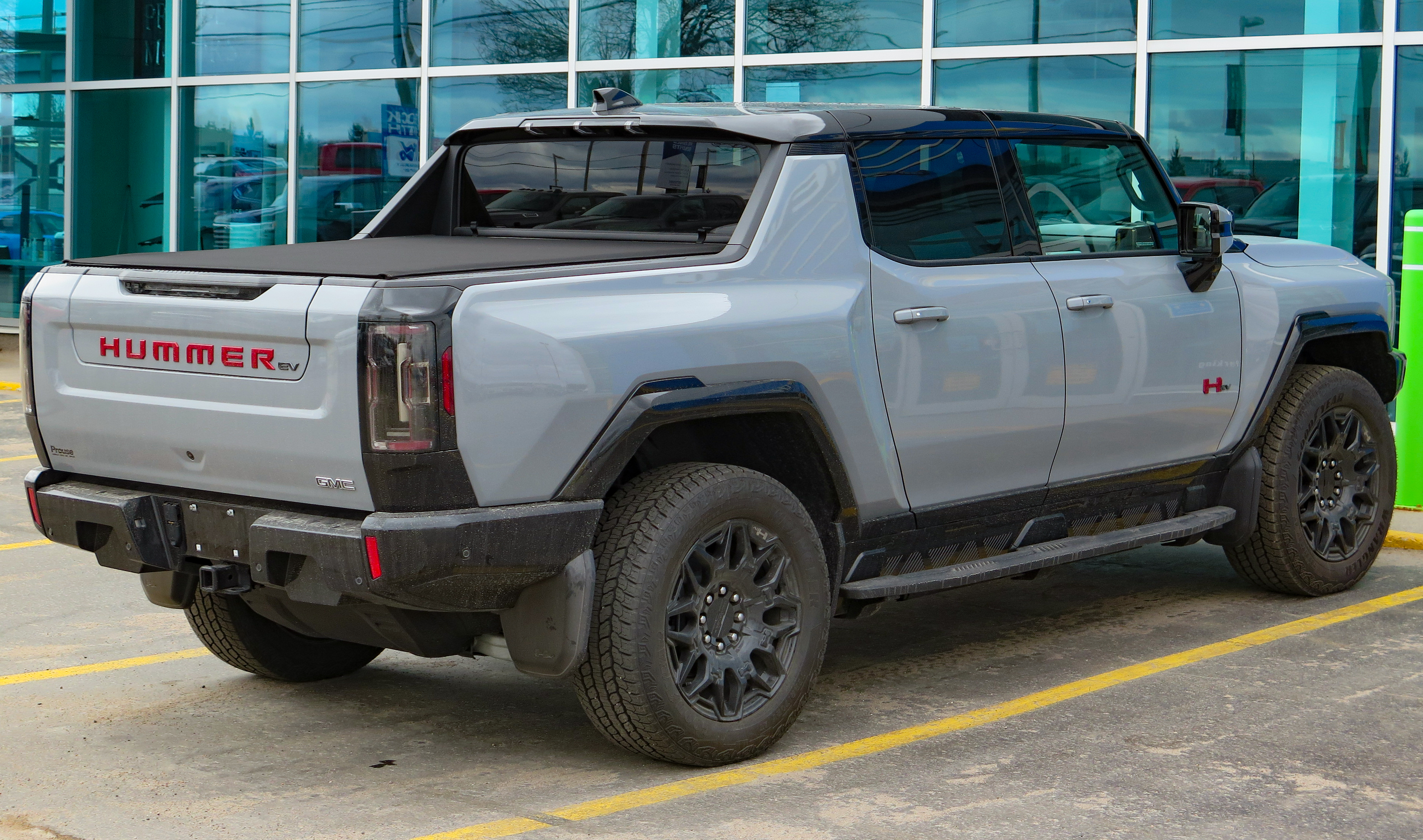
Rear view (Pickup truck)

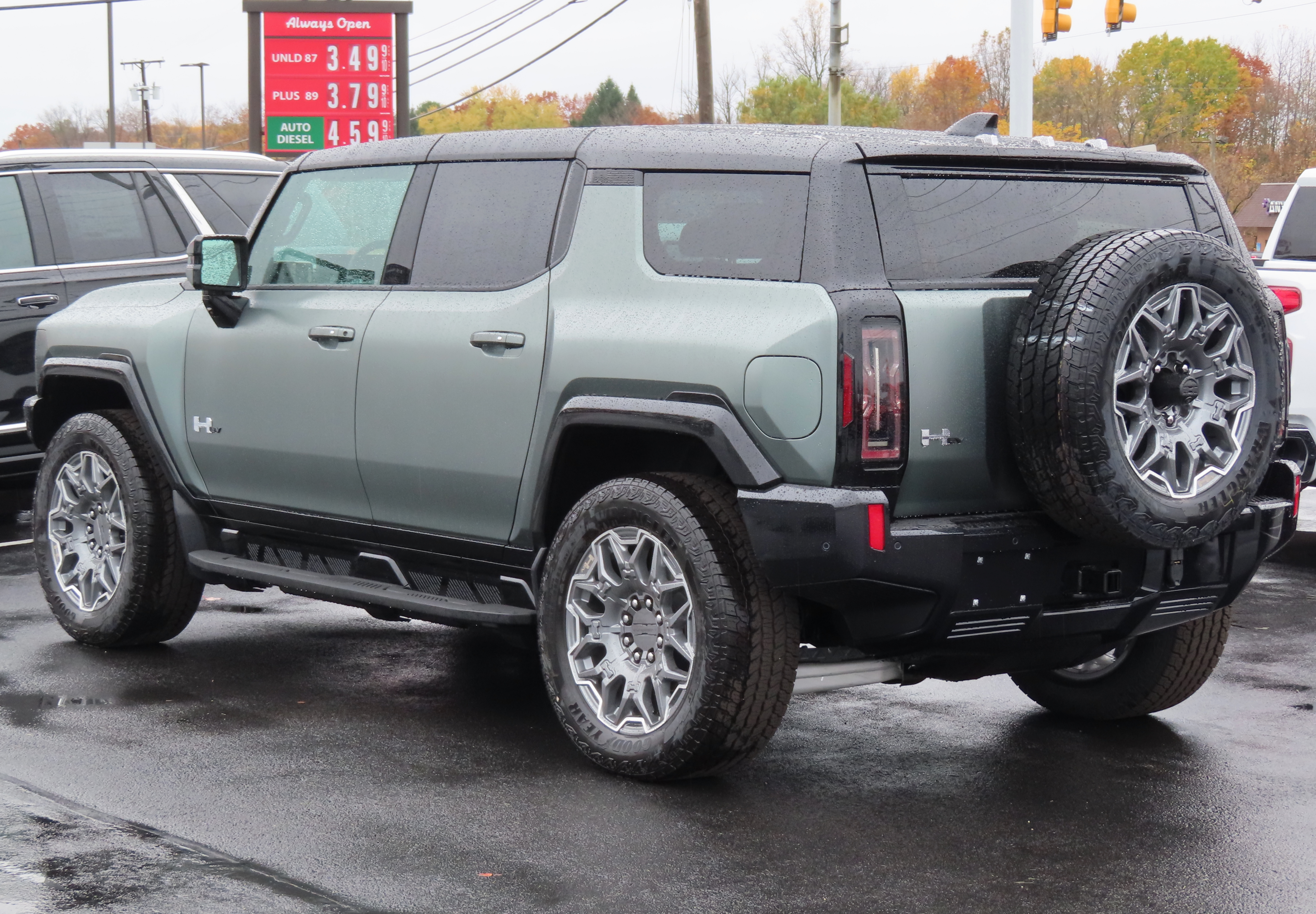
Rear view (SUV)

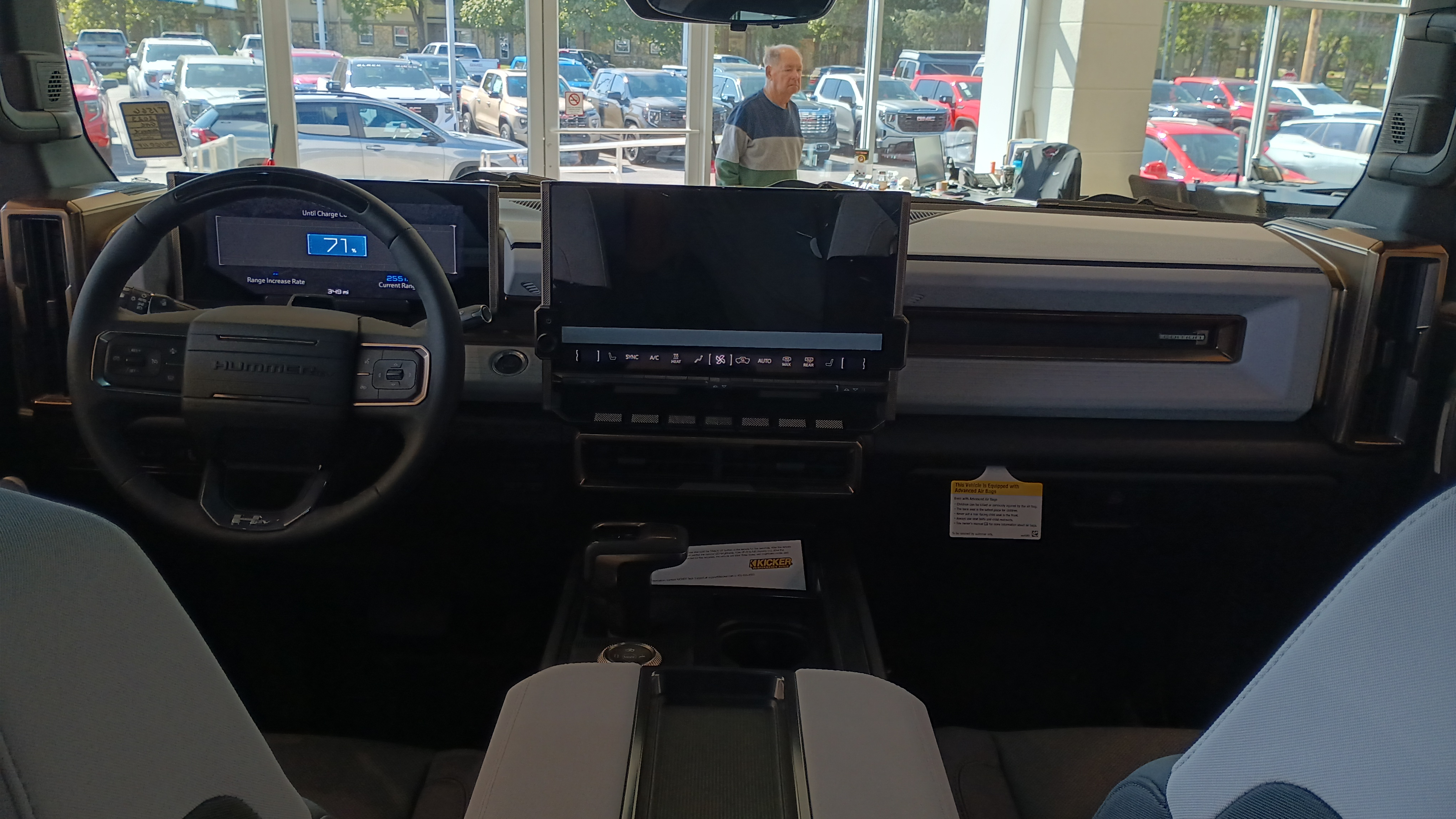
Interior (Pickup truck)

=== Edition 1 ===
Edition 1 started production in 2022 as a limited edition and the sole model available for the first year. It was available for pre-order by the end of the launch event on October 20, 2020. All Edition 1 units are white with a black roof and feature bronze-colored wheels. The interior is a two-tone black-and-gray with bronze accents and Edition 1 badges. The Edition 1 also features Easter eggs themed after the Apollo 11 moon landing. Edition 1 has three electric motors with 1,000 hp (750 kW; 1,000 PS), 329 miles (529 km) of range, and is fitted with the Extreme Off-Road package, which includes 35-inch (890 mm) mud-terrain tires, skid plates, and rock sliders. The Hummer EV Edition 1 sold out in the first 10 minutes of opening the pre-orders. Initial sales of the Edition 1 were delayed, but were later available in 2022.

The "Crab Walk" feature, which allows the Hummer EV to travel diagonally by using four-wheel steering, comes standard with Edition 1. Edition 1 also includes UltraVision underbody cameras for easier off-road maneuverability and visibility, adaptive air suspension, steel underbody armor, a system called "Extract Mode" which lifts the suspension six inches (150 mm) for more clearance, a driver assistance system that allows for automatic lane change and hands-free driving on compatible highways that have been mapped by GM, a digital key, removable roof panels, and GMC's MultiPro Tailgate. In Extract Mode, approach, departure, and breakover angles are 49.7, 38.4, and 32.2 degrees respectively. Ground clearance is 15.9 in (400 mm) and maximum water fording depth is 32 in (810 mm). GMC estimates wall-climbing ability at 18 in (460 mm) and suspension travel at 13 in (330 mm).

=== EV^{3X} ===
Following the end of production for the Edition 1, GMC introduced the EV3X trim in 2023 as model year 2023 for the Pickup body style, and model year 2024 for the SUV body style. The Pickup version has near identical specifications as the Edition 1 and features three electric motors with an output of 1,000 horsepower, along with an EPA estimated range of 329 miles with the off-road package and 355 miles with the standard 22-inch wheels. The SUV version of the EV3X trim also features three electric motors, outputting 830 horsepower in the SUV configuration, along with EPA estimated range of 298 miles with the off-road package and 314 miles with the standard 22-inch wheels.

=== EV^{2x} ===
Includes all the features of EV^{2}; however, it will also come standard with four-wheel steering, Crab Walk, adaptive air suspension with adaptive ride control, and optional Extract mode. This trim will output an estimated 625 hp (466 kW; 634 PS) using a dual motor system, will have an estimated range of at least 300 miles (480 km), and is expected to be available in Spring of 2023.

=== EV^{2} ===
This was set to be the base Hummer EV trim which was to include Super Cruise, HD surround view, digital key, infinity roof, a multi pro tailgate, and rear drop glass among other standard features. The EV^{2} was expected to output an estimated 625 hp (466 kW; 634 PS) using a dual motor system, with an estimated range of at least 250 miles (400 km). It was expected to be available by Spring 2024.

== Production ==
The Hummer EV is produced at GM's Detroit/Hamtramck Assembly (also referred to as Factory Zero) plant in Michigan. Production of the Hummer EV Truck commenced on November 17, 2021, while the Hummer EV SUV started production on January 30, 2023. In October 2020, GM invested $2.2 billion in the plant for the production of these electric vehicles. As of Q3 2022, 783 units had been delivered to customers. For the 2024 model year, GMC introduced a limited "Omega Edition" trim with production of this trim limited to 550 examples for the Pickup body style and 1,108 for the SUV body style. As of October 2024, 14,039 units have been produced. The Hummer EV is manufactured by General Motors exclusively in left-hand drive (LHD) configuration. For right-hand drive (RHD) markets, conversions are carried out by Autogroup International, a specialist vehicle engineering company. These conversions are performed to original equipment manufacturer (OEM) standards, enabling the Hummer EV to be compliant and operable in countries where RHD vehicles are required.

== Marketing ==
On January 30, 2020, GM released three advertisements for the Hummer EV, followed by Super Bowl LIV commercials on February 2, 2020, with LeBron James as the spokesperson. In January 2021, GMC announced a multiyear sponsorship deal with Chip Ganassi Racing (CGR) which sees CGR rebranded as GMC Hummer EV Chip Ganassi Racing in the FIA-sanctioned international electric off-road racing series Extreme E. As part of the sponsorship deal, the team's Spark Odyssey 21 body will be styled as the Hummer EV.

== Sales ==
Calendar year	US (pickup and SUV)
2022	854
2023	3,244
2024	13,993
2025	15,788

== Criticism and safety concerns ==
The GMC Hummer EV is over twice the weight of an average American car. The Insurance Institute for Highway Safety performed checks to ensure their equipment could handle its mass before crash testing it, since it weighs around 3,500 pounds (1,600 kg) more than any vehicle previously tested. As an SUV, it is far more likely to kill pedestrians in accidents than a conventional car. It has been noted by critics concerned about the safety of the vehicle. Jennifer Homendy, the head of the United States' National Transportation Safety Board, said that the Hummer EV is an example of a heavy electric vehicle, which is more likely to kill or seriously injure other road users in the event of a collision, alongside products from.

It can accelerate from a standstill to 60 miles per hour (97 km/h) in around three seconds. The vehicle's ability to gain speed so quickly has furthered concerns about the danger it may pose to other road users. In the United States it can be driven by anyone with a normal drivers' license, while in Europe a heavy goods vehicle license may be required to drive it as weighs 1,300 pounds (590 kg) more than the 7,700-pound (3,500 kg) maximum allowed for a regular European driving license obtained after January 1997. These factors have contributed to concerns that some owners may not be sufficiently skilled to drive it safely. General Motors responded to concerns by saying that their "customer's safety is a top priority regardless of the type of propulsion or mass of the vehicle".

It is intended to appeal to customers who otherwise would not have considered buying an electric vehicle, with the expectation that most owners will purchase it as a second or third car, likely negating the environmental benefits of its electric drivetrain. However, some believe the Hummer EV may encourage increased uptake of other, smaller electric vehicles. The "Edition 1" variant has a United States Environmental Protection Agency (EPA) energy-consumption rating of 43 mpg‑e (49 kWh/100 km) on highways, 51 mpg‑e (41 kWh/100 km) in cities, and 47 mpg‑e (45 kWh/100 km) combined and an EPA combined range of 329 miles (529 km). Its high mass leads to high levels of particulate emissions from tire and road wear compared with lighter vehicles, which can cause various negative health effects. Because of this, the Hummer EV has been described as an attempt at "greenwashing".

== See also ==
- Chevrolet Silverado EV
- Cadillac Escalade IQ
