= Detroit/Hamtramck Assembly =

Factory in the United States

Factory ZERO Detroit/Hamtramck Assembly
- Built: 1911
- Operated: 1911–1980, 1985–present
- Location: 2500 E Grand Blvd; Detroit, Michigan, United States
- Coordinates: 42.38111°N 83.04703°W
- Industry: Automotive
- Products: Electric pickup trucks
- Employees: 924 (2022)
- Buildings: 365 acres (1.48 km^{2})
- Area: 4,500,000 sq ft (420,000 m^{2})
- Owners: Dodge Brothers (1911–1928); Chrysler (1928–1980); General Motors (1985–present)
- Website: gm.com/factory-zero

Detroit/Hamtramck Assembly, also referred to as Factory Zero (and historically as GM Poletown), is an automotive assembly plant located on the border between Detroit and Hamtramck, Michigan, United States, owned and operated by General Motors. It currently assembles the GMC Hummer EV, Cadillac Escalade IQ, Chevrolet Silverado EV and GMC Sierra EV battery electric vehicles for the North American market.

The site was originally a factory for Dodge, known alternately as Dodge Main or simply the Dodge Factory. It opened in 1911 and operated continually until the 1970s when diminishing demand led to the site increasingly being used for secondary roles. In 1979 it was announced it would be closed, which occurred early in 1980. The site was dormant until 1981, when GM purchased it for $1 with plans for a large factory complex covering the original Dodge site and a number of surrounding parcels of land. These included Detroit's Poletown neighbourhood, which had been a location for immigration from Poland and other countries. Attempts to stop these neighbourhoods from being demolished led to several court cases, which GM won.

The new plant replaced GM's Detroit Assembly, which had been the primary facility for all Cadillacs starting in 1921. The new factory officially produced its first vehicle on 4 February 1985, a Cadillac Eldorado. Over the next 35 years it built vehicles for GM's Chevrolet, GMC and Cadillac divisions, originally known as "BOC" for Buick/Oldsmobile/Cadillac, but one of those nameplates have since been discontinued. In early 2017 it had approximately 1,800 hourly and salaried employees, and 924 in late 2022. Since opening in 1985, more than 4 million vehicles have been built at the plant.

As of May 2020, the plant is being retooled to produce electric vehicles, and took the name Factory Zero as part of this rebuilding. The first vehicle rolled off the new line on 17 December 2021, a GMC Hummer EV.

== History ==
=== Dodge (1911–1980) ===
The Dodge Factory, or "Dodge Main" as it became known, occupied 67 acres (0.27 km^{2}) on the edge of the village of Hamtramck, which is surrounded by the city of Detroit. Plant 4, on Conant Avenue, was separated only from the main plant structures by a railroad right-of-way, which was also the boundary line between the two cities. The plant started off as just a few buildings but it grew rapidly as needed, where it ended up as 35 separate buildings, to include a foundry, before it was demolished. The original plant was designed by noted industrial designer and architect Albert Kahn Associates but was replaced in 1912 by the architectural firm of Smith, Hinchman & Grylls, due to a disagreement with the Dodge brothers. Reflecting an engineering philosophy the brothers shared, the plant was vastly overbuilt.

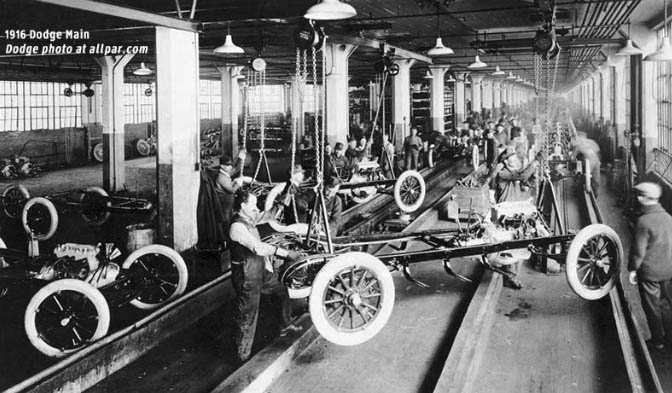
Factory assembly line in 1916

There were two railroads crossing the area, and plenty of open land at the time. One of the railroad lines went north to the nearby Highland Park Ford Plant which had just opened earlier. The original intent was to continue providing parts and subassemblies, and ship them to Ford. It also included the first time a car manufacturer used a vehicle test track, including a portion where newly manufactured cars would drive up a ramp, to test the powertrain durability and the brakes on the way down.

John and Horace had grown up on factory floors and machine shops, and they made sure their employees were taken care of. The Dodge facility had a complete medical facility, with doctors and nurses on duty at all times, a plant security department, and a firefighting department with direct contact with the local Hamtramck Fire Department.

The plant included a "welfare department" that looked after workers’ social needs and, reflecting the innovative nature of the Dodge brothers, a machine shop they called "the Playpen," where employees who wanted to fix or invent things could indulge in their ideas after hours. The facility had an executive dining room for senior plant and corporate officials and a cafeteria for office and plant employees, complete with a fully equipped kitchen; a smaller facility in Plant 4 prepared hot food for distribution directly to the factory areas via small trolleys. The factory was approximately two miles south of Lynch Road Assembly, which built Plymouth products exclusively until 1962. When the Chrysler C platform was introduced in 1965, the factory manufactured Dodge and Plymouth products that shared the platform.

By the 1970s, manufacturing and assembly needs began to diminish. A few small buildings around the facility were demolished, and others were repurposed to uses like research and record storage. By 1979, only 5,200 hourly employees remained at the plant, a sliver of the 36,000 employees that worked there during the peak in the 1940s. Dodge was struggling financially, and in an effort to cut costs it announced in spring 1979 that the plant would be closing. The plant subsequently closed on January 4, 1980.

=== General Motors (1981–present) ===
The facility remained dormant until 1981, when General Motors moved to purchase the plant for $1 to build a new factory. The 362 acres (1.46 km^{2}) acquired also was home to a large Polish community that was part of an area that is sometimes referred to as Poletown. The proposed GM facility included land that was home to 4,200 residents, 1,400 homes, several churches (including Immaculate Conception Church) and 140 businesses, plus the old Dodge factory. The residential area had been north of the Dodge facility. GM's acquisition of part of the property through eminent domain, and the subsequent clearing of this section of the neighborhood, was the subject of various protests and court battles. Eventually, the case went to the Michigan Supreme Court, which ruled in favor of General Motors, stating that economic development is a legitimate use of eminent domain. Detroit Mayor Coleman Young sided with GM, seeking new jobs and investments for the struggling area.

The site is near (south) of another GM facility at the time, called Chevrolet Gear & Axle Division, which itself was the combination of two former factories, called Detroit Gear and Axle and Detroit Forge, which had occupied the location at Holbrook Avenue to the south, Lumpkin Street to the east, Poland Avenue to the north and I-75 to the west. (That factory was demolished in 2014, having occupied its location since 1917.)

While some residents protested the GM's sweeping development plans, others supported the efforts to build the new plant. Gary Campbell, a Poletown resident and bar owner, accused those opposing the new plant of presenting the opinions of a small minority as if they represented the entire neighborhood. The controversy led to national news attention and the involvement of Ralph Nader and the Gray Panthers. Protests centered around the Immaculate Conception Roman Catholic Church. The Detroit Archdiocese supported the relocations and had already agreed to sell the two Catholic churches that were in the area. However, Joseph Karasiewicz, the priest at one of the parishes, defied his local Cardinal and fought to keep his building from being sold. The Archdiocese stood firm in its support of the sale. A 29-day sit-in at the Immaculate Conception Church came to an end on July 14, 1981, when police forcibly evicted 20 people from the church. Twelve people were arrested; only three of the twelve arrested were from Poletown. Shortly afterward, the site targeted for the plant was razed and construction began on the new $500 million auto assembly plant. The controversy inspired at least one short film: "Poletown Lives!"

A small Jewish cemetery, Beth Olem, occupies part of the grounds of the GM Assembly at the extreme northwest corner of the property, next to the water treatment facility. The older pre-existing auto plant parking lot engulfed the small cemetery long before General Motors built the new assembly plant. Visitation is currently limited to twice a year on the Sundays preceding Rosh Hashana and Passover.

The plans went forward and GM's Detroit-Hamtramck plant was opened in February 1985. Cadillac K-body production was consolidated there in the 1990s. The Detroit-Hamtramck Assembly later received the contract for the production of Chevrolet Volt, which uses the Delta II/Voltec body. On April 21, 2010, GM announced it would invest $121 million into the Detroit/Hamtramck factory to ensure GM could keep up with the demand for the next generation Chevrolet Malibu. In May 2011, GM announced it would invest $69 million in the plant for the Chevrolet Impala. In 2013, production of the Cadillac ELR (a Cadillac equivalent of the Chevrolet Volt) began, followed two years later by production of the Cadillac CT6 and then the third-generation Buick LaCrosse.

In December 2016, GM announced they would soon eliminate the second shift and 1,300 jobs at the plant, less than twelve months after the second shift was added. Then in October 2017, GM indicated there would be an additional reduction in production at the plant, citing falling sales and excess inventory of sedans (which were made there), resulting in about 200 additional jobs lost. In 2018 the utilization rate at the plant was only 28 percent of the 230,000 unit production capability. Subsequently, on November 26, 2018, GM announced that the plant would be "unallocated" in 2019.

In February, 2019, General Motors (GM) announced that production of the Chevrolet Impala and Cadillac CT6 would continue at Detroit/Hamtramck Assembly until early 2020. Coincident with the discontinuation of the CT6 and Impala in 2020, the factory began a retooling to build electric vehicles, starting with the GMC Hummer EV.

The first GMC Hummer EV Pickup rolled off the assembly line at the rebranded Factory Zero on December 17, 2021.

== Vehicles produced ==
=== Current ===
- Chevrolet Silverado EV (2023–present)
- GMC Hummer EV (2021–present)
- GMC Sierra EV (2024–present)
- Cadillac Escalade IQ (2024–present)

=== Previous ===
==== Chrysler Corp. ====
- Dodge 30-35 First Dodge engineered vehicle
- Dodge Series D5/Dodge Series D8 1937, 1938
- Dodge St. Regis 1978–1980
- Dodge Aspen / Plymouth Volare 1976–1979
- Dodge Demon 1971–1972
- Dodge Challenger / Plymouth Barracuda 1970–1974
- Dodge Charger 1966–1969
- Dodge Dart 1962–1976
- Dodge Lancer 1955–1962
- Dodge Royal 1954–1959
- Dodge Coronet 1949–1969
- Dodge Meadowbrook 1949–1954
- Dodge Wayfarer 1949–1952
- Dodge Custom 1946–1949
- Dodge Deluxe 1946–1949

==== General Motors ====
- Cadillac CT6 2016–2020
- Chevrolet Impala 2014–2020
- Buick LaCrosse 2017–2019
- Cadillac ELR 2014 and 2016
- Chevrolet Malibu 2013–2015
- Holden Volt 2013–2015
- Opel/Vauxhall Ampera 2012–2015
- Chevrolet Volt 2011–2019
- Buick Lucerne 2006–2011
- Cadillac DTS 2006–2011
- Pontiac Bonneville 2004–2005
- Buick LeSabre 2000–2005
- Buick Park Avenue 1997–2005
- Cadillac DeVille 1994–2005
- Buick Riviera 1986–1993
- Oldsmobile Toronado 1986–1992
- Cadillac Allanté 1987–1993
- Cadillac Seville 1986–2004
- Cadillac Eldorado 1986–2000
- Cruise Origin

== See also ==
- List of Chrysler factories
