= Stellantis Canada =

Wholly owned subsidiary of Stellantis

- Formerly: Chrysler of Canada (1952–1963); Chrysler Canada (1963–1998; 2007–2014); DaimlerChrysler Canada (1998–2007); FCA Canada, Inc. (2014–2021)
- Type: Subsidiary
- Industry: Automotive
- Founded: June 1925; 101 years ago
- Headquarters: 1 Riverside Drive West, Windsor, Ontario, Canada
- Key people: Trevor Longley (Chairman, President, CEO)
- Products: Automobiles; Light Trucks; Vans; Light Commercial Vehicles
- Owner: Stellantis
- Number of employees: 9,000
- Parent: Stellantis North America
- Website: www.stellantis.com/en

Stellantis Canada (formerly, FCA Canada, Inc. and Chrysler Canada) is the wholly owned subsidiary of Stellantis through its North American division operating in Canada. Incorporated in 1925, the Chrysler Corporation of Canada acquired a Maxwell-Chalmers plant in Windsor, Ontario that had been used to manufacture some Chrysler models in the previous year. Initially called Chrysler Canada, Ltd, the name of the company changed to DaimlerChrysler Canada Inc. following the merger of the two parent automotive conglomerates. In August 2007, the company was renamed Chrysler Canada Incorporated when Cerberus Capital Management purchased 80.1% of its parent company Chrysler.

FCA Canada has three manufacturing plants in operation in Canada, and built 535,878 cars and trucks in 2002. In 2007, the company sold 232,688 vehicles in the Canadian market. In 2012, Stellantis Canada sales were 243,845, a 6% increase over 2011; this put the company into the #2 sales slot for Canada.

== History ==
FCA Canada was established in mid-June 1925, with 181 employees. 7,857 vehicles were produced in the first year.

=== "Plodge" ===
Plodge, a portmanteau of the names Plymouth and Dodge, is a name informally used to refer to vehicles Chrysler Canada built with a mix of U.S. Plymouth and Dodge parts for the Canadian and export markets. This practice allowed dealers in Canada to offer a wider array of vehicles at lower development cost in the relatively small Canadian market. For example, a Plymouth with a Dodge grille and taillights became a Dodge without the expense of tooling a vehicle for the market. On the Dodge Dart introduced in 1960, only the interiors were shared; Canadian-market 1960-61 Darts had Plymouth dashboards. The 1965 to 1966 Dodge Monaco used a Dodge body, with a Plymouth Fury dashboard and interior trim. Not all Canadian-market Chrysler-built vehicles were badge engineered in this manner, however; the DeSoto Diplomat, for example—a rebadged Dodge Dart—was never sold in Canada, where DeSotos were similar to the US models. The Canadian 1960 DeSoto Adventurer looked like the American 1960 DeSoto but used the upholstery and door panels from the 1960 Chrysler Saratoga.

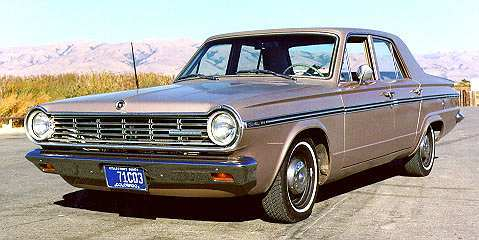
The 1965 Canadian-market Valiant Custom 200 was a rebadged U.S. Dodge Dart.

The Valiant was sold by both Dodge and Plymouth dealers as a separate make, as had been the original plan in the United States. 1960 to 1962 Canadian Valiants were substantially the same as American models, with minor trim and mechanical equipment differences. 1963-64 Canadian Valiants had U.S. Valiant front sheetmetal on the U.S. Dart body. 1965 Canadian Valiants were available in the full range of sizes and models offered across the American Valiant and Dart models, but all Canadian-market cars used Dart instrument clusters and were badged "Valiant". For 1966, the Valiant Barracuda was the only offering in Canada on the U.S. Valiant's 106 in (269.2 cm) wheelbase, with no Valiant station wagons in Canada for 1966.

"Plodge" vehicles include:

- DeSoto Diplomat: Dodge Dart body, DeSoto-like side trim
- Dodge Kingsway: Dodge body, Plymouth fenders and trim
- Dodge Mayfair: Dodge front clip, Plymouth body
- Dodge Regent: Dodge front clip, Plymouth body
- Dodge Crusader: Dodge Front Clip (grille minus six "teeth") Plymouth body
- Dodge Viscount: Dodge front clip, Plymouth body
- Dodge Monaco 1965-1966: Used 1965-1966 Plymouth Fury dashboard
- Valiant 1960-1966: parts mix varied by model year
- Dodge Dart 1960-1961: Plymouth instrument panel

Once the Canada–United States Automotive Products Agreement (the "Auto Pact") took practical effect in 1967, virtually all differences ceased to exist between U.S. and Canadian Chrysler products. However, until the early 2000s the model distribution within and among marques was sometimes different in Canada than in the U.S. The Dodge and Plymouth Neon was sold in Canada as the Chrysler Neon; the Dodge Dynasty and Intrepid were likewise both badged and sold as Chrysler models in Canada. In 2003 this practice was stopped and the U.S. and Canadian marque and model ranges are fully aligned.

Historically, Stellantis Canada sold vehicles under the Dodge, Plymouth, Chrysler, DeSoto, Valiant, and Imperial marques. Presently there are four marques: Dodge, Ram, Jeep, and Chrysler. Dodge is the mainstream car and van line, Jeep is the main SUV range, Chrysler is the premium line, and Ram is the range of trucks and truck-based SUVs.

== Operations ==
=== Manufacturing plants ===
Plant	Location	Year opened	Notes
Brampton Assembly	2000 Williams Parkway East, Brampton, Ontario	1986	It is being closed having had production of the Jeep Compass move to the US.
Windsor Assembly	2199 Chrysler Center, Windsor, Ontario	1928	Employs 4,671 on two shifts and produces the Chrysler Pacifica and Chrysler Voyager minivans as well as the Dodge Charger
Etobicoke Casting	15 Browns Line, Etobicoke, Ontario	1942	Acquired in 1964; employs 218 on three shifts and produces aluminum die castings for Chrysler, Dodge, Jeep and Ram vehicles

Stellantis Canada has other operations in Canada:

=== Offices ===
- One Riverside Drive headquarters - employs 345 in Windsor, Ontario
- Automotive Research and Development Centre - employs 200 in Windsor, Ontario
- DC Transport - employs 326 in Windsor, Ontario
- National Fleet Office - employs 16 in Mississauga, Ontario
- Eastern Business Centre - employs 37 in Mississauga, Ontario
- Quebec Business Centre - employs 24 in Montreal, Quebec
- Western Business Centre - employs 26 in Calgary, Alberta
- Atlantic Sales Branch - Moncton, New Brunswick

=== Parts and distribution centres ===
- employs 190 in Mississauga, Ontario (regional and national)
- employs 26 in Red Deer, Alberta
