= Dodge Mayfair =

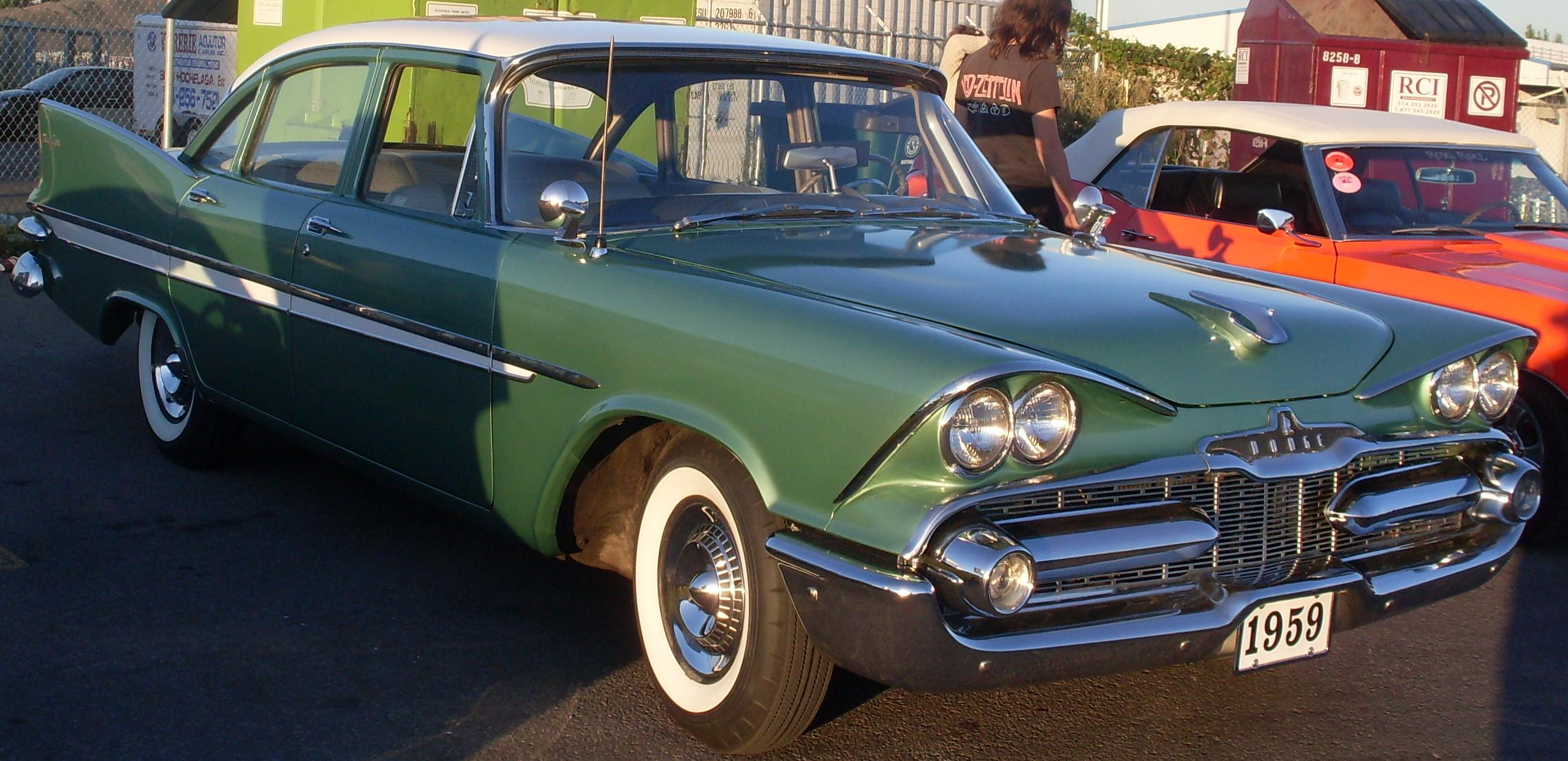
- 1959 Dodge Mayfair 4-Door Sedan

Overview
- Manufacturer: Dodge (Chrysler)
- Production: 1953 to 1959
- Assembly: Windsor, Ontario, Canada

Body and chassis
- Class: Full-size
- Body style: 2-door sedan 4-door sedan 2-door hardtop 2-door convertible
- Layout: FR layout

The Dodge Mayfair was an automobile built by Chrysler Corporation of Canada Ltd. This vehicle was produced solely for the Canadian market from 1953 to 1959. Its American equivalent was the Plymouth Belvedere. It was based on the Plymouth.

The Mayfair name first appeared as a 2-door hardtop in the 1951 Dodge Regent series, just as the Belvedere appeared in the Cranbrook series. The 1952 Mayfair adopted the same paint scheme as the 1952 Belvedere with the roof color sweeping down onto the rear trunk.

When the 1953 models were introduced, the Mayfair was again the hardtop in the Regent series. In April, 1953, though, Chrysler of Canada introduced a new, upscale series to do battle with the Chevrolet Bel Air and Pontiac Laurentian.

The D43-3 Mayfair was introduced in both hardtop and sedan models. The exterior had the front fender trim extend onto the front door and backup lamps were standard. Interiors were two-tone, in either blue or green, with a matching steering wheel. With the new D43-3, the Regent Mayfair hardtop was dropped.

Under the hood, the engine was increased from 218 cu in (3,570 cc) to 228 cu in (3,740 cc) and Chrysler of Canada introduced Hy-Drive on Plymouth and Dodge models.

For 1954, the Mayfair used the interiors of the new Plymouth Belvedere. The base engine and transmission were unchanged. For the first time since 1937, Chrysler of Canada offered a convertible in its Plymouth-based models, importing the Mayfair convertible from Detroit, a badge-engineered Kingsway Custom.

The V8 engine came to Chrysler of Canada's low-priced models in 1955. As before, the Mayfair was largely a Plymouth Belvedere, using that car's 115 in (2,900 mm) wheelbase and body with Dodge's front sheetmetal. The engines were imported from Detroit with various covers, manifolds, electrical pieces and rubber parts added in Windsor. Only the Mayfair offered a V8. And both Plymouth and Dodge offered PowerFlite 2-speed automatic with its new dash-mounted control lever. The Hy-Drive unit was eliminated.

Things changed in 1956 when Chrysler of Canada opened a new V8 engine plant. The Mayfair was now V8 only, while the lower-priced Dodge Crusader and Dodge Regent could be had with either the six or V8. Early in the model the 270 cu in (4,400 cc) V8 was installed while later the all new 277 cu in (4,540 cc)was introduced. A 4-door hardtop was added to the line and the Powerflite automatic was controlled by new dash-mounted pushbuttons.

Totally new bodies designed by Virgil Exner debuted for 1957. They were a styling sensation with their low lines, plenty of glass and thin roof designs. Body engineering and tooling errors, though, resulted in a car that quickly gained a reputation for poor quality and rust. Chrysler Corporation's new 3-speed Torqueflite automatic was now available on all Mayfair models, still only with the 303 cu in (4,970 cc) V8, and all Chrysler Corporation cars adopted Torsion-Aire torsion bar front suspension.

Sales for 1957 were down from 1956 for all Canadian-built Dodge models, but 1958 was a disaster with sales falling over 40%. Grilles, taillights and trim were all that were new for 1958. The Mayfair adopted the 313 cu in (5,130 cc) poly V8 engine.

The Mayfair's last year was 1959, when it was downgraded a notch to take the place of the Regent, while the Crusader was dropped. The 1959 Mayfair still came in two and four door sedan and hardtop, plus the imported 3-seat Custom Suburban station wagon and convertible. Although the wagon models were 318 CID V8 only, the other models were now available with either the 251 CID flathead six or the 313 CID V8.

For 1960 the Canadian Dodge based on the Plymouth would be replaced by another Plymouth-based car, the Dodge Dart. The Mayfair would become a sub-model of the Dart line for 1960, and renamed the Phoenix.

The vehicle has been commonly referred to as a Plodge because of the extensive use of Plymouth components with Dodge front grilles and sold at Dodge sales outlets.

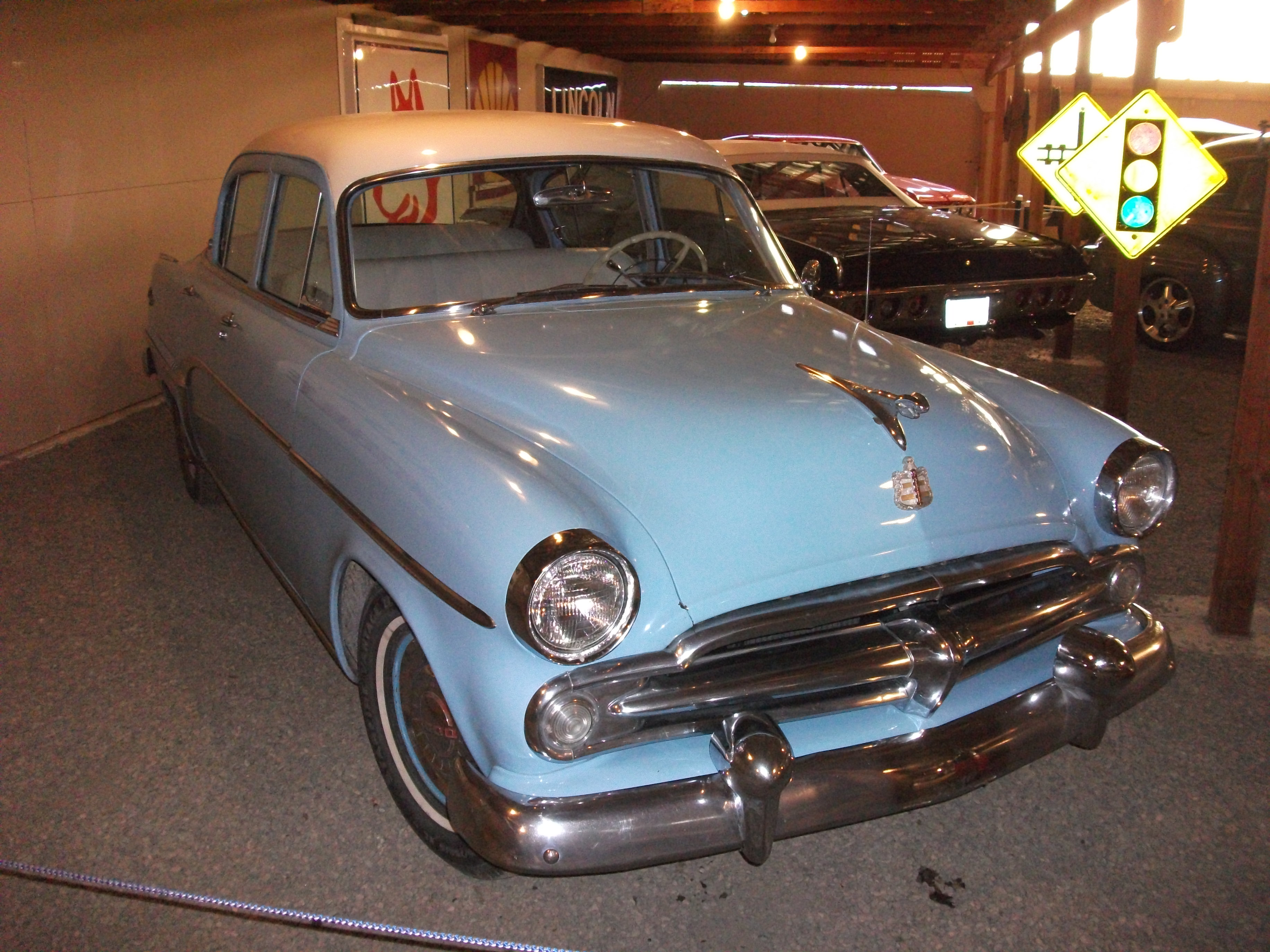
1954 Dodge Mayfair Four Door Sedan

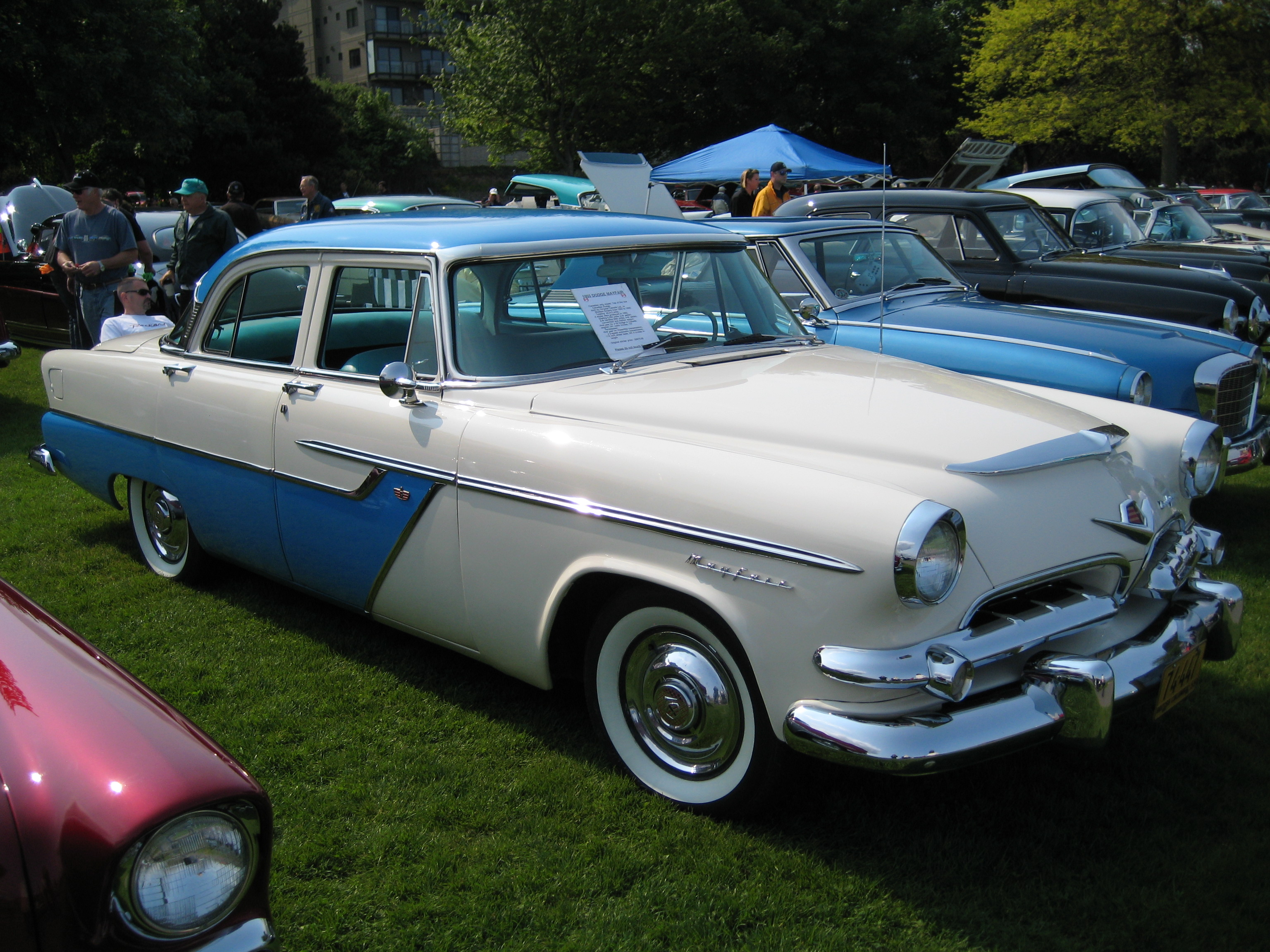
1955 Dodge Mayfair Four Door Sedan

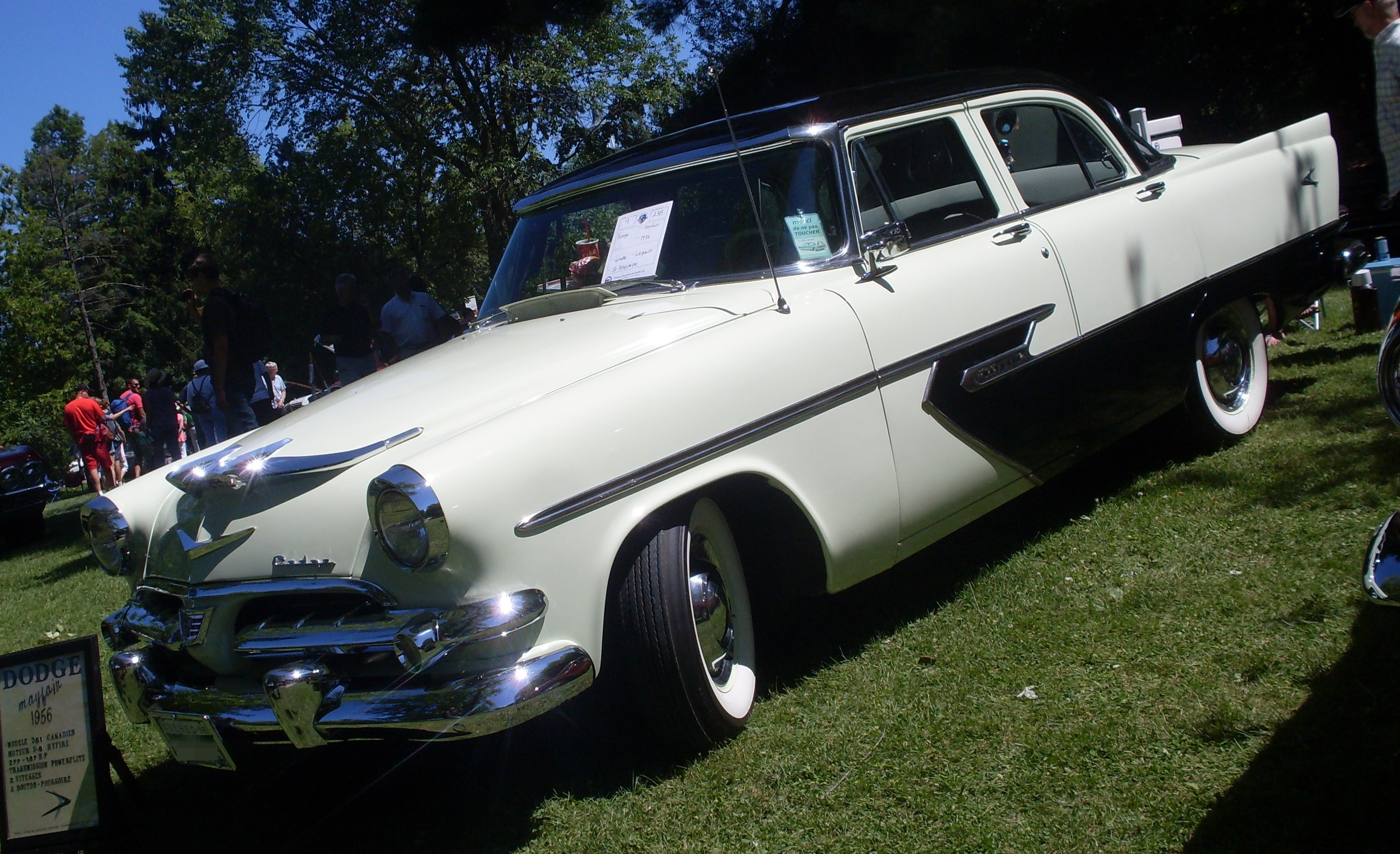
1956 Dodge Mayfair Four-Door Sedan
