= Dodge Wayfarer =

First Generation
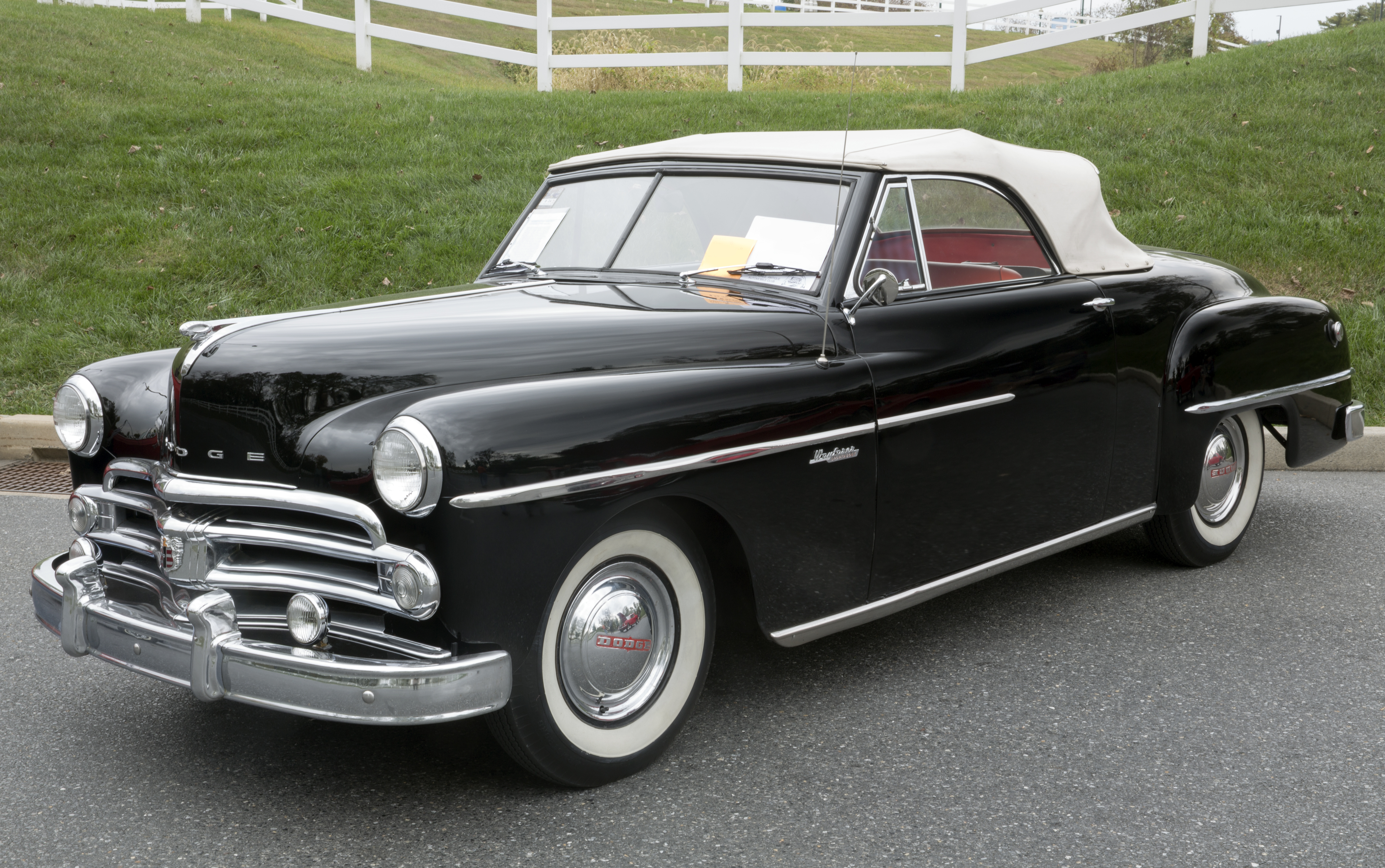
- 1950 Dodge Wayfarer Sportabout

Overview
- Manufacturer: Dodge (Chrysler)
- Production: 1949–1952
- Assembly: Dodge Main Factory, Hamtramck, MI

Body and chassis
- Body style: 2-door roadster/Sportabout; 2-door business coupe; 2-door sedan
- Related: Chrysler Windsor; DeSoto Deluxe

Powertrain
- Engine: 230 cu in (3,773 cc) Dodge Straight 6

Dimensions
- Wheelbase: 115 in (2,921 mm)
- Length: 195 in (4,953 mm) (1949-50); 199 7/8 in (5,077 mm) (1951-52)
- Width: 73 in (1,854 mm) (1949-52)
- Height: 63 1/2 in (1,613 mm)

Chronology
- Predecessor: Dodge Eight (1930)
- Successor: Dodge Meadowbrook Special

The Dodge Wayfarer is an automobile produced by Dodge from February 1949 until 1952. It was discontinued without a replacement in the United States, although the Kingsway series remained available in export markets. The Wayfarer was the first true roadster built by the Big Three since the 1930s. However, the roadster concept was soon altered to the plusher Sportabout as higher comfort levels were demanded by the post-war auto buyers. 9325 roadsters and Sportabouts were built, out of a total of 217,623 Wayfarers of all bodystyles.

== 1949 ==
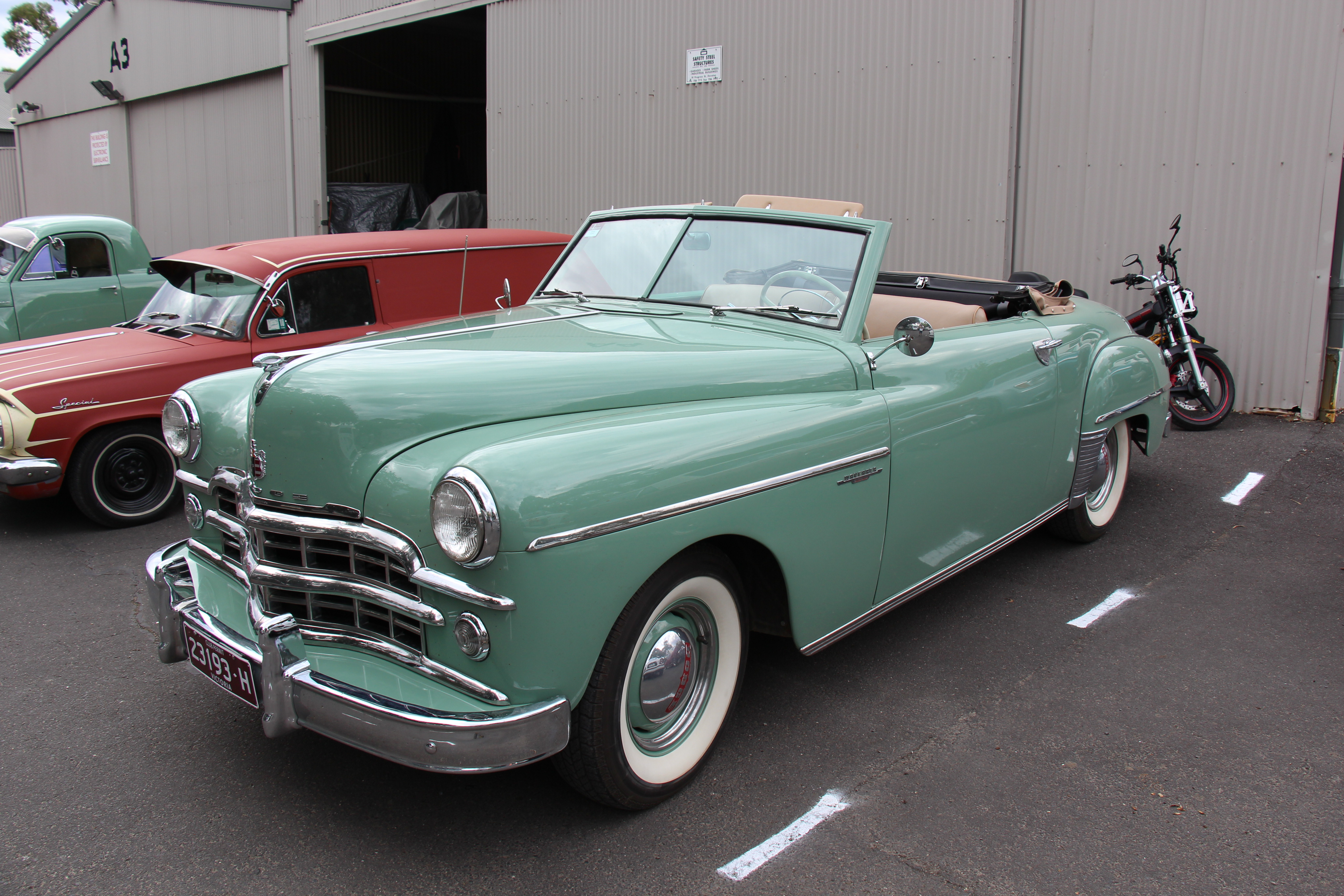
1949 Dodge Wayfarer roadster

The "true" 1949 Dodges were introduced in February 1949, after a long production run of the 1948s. The Wayfarer (known as the D-29 series), aside from its shorter wheelbase, shared the boxy corporate design of the new 1949 Chrysler products. While much improved over the earlier Dodges, the Wayfarer still had to do without features such as a crankshaft dampener, the new Micronic oil filter, a splash-proof distributor, and rivetless brake linings. The windshield wipers were vacuum-powered rather than electric, and only the right-hand door received an exterior lock - the roadster receiving none. The Wayfarer arrived with three different bodystyles: a two-door sedan, a two-door business coupe, and the two-door roadster (only entering production in May). The business coupe shared some bodywork with Plymouth's business coupe version, but the other Wayfarers had unique pressings. A one-barrel, L-head inline-six of 230 cu in (3.8 L) was installed, with 103 hp (77 kW). This was to be the only engine option for the Wayfarer's entire production run.

The roadster had removable plastic side windows instead of wind-down units, and a short top which eliminated the need for rear quarter windows. More permanent swing-out vent windows were available as an option. However, Californian regulations on hand signalling meant that roll-down windows had to be added quick and retro-fitted to Californian market vehicles. This happened in September, after which the roll-down windows became a rarely selected delete-option. A roadster with a rumble seat was even tested (with a bottom-hinged trunk lid), but the opening would have had to be moved and the cost of tooling up for such an option meant that it was soon dropped.

1949 production totalled 63,816, equalling 25 percent of Dodge's total number. Of these, 49,054 were sedans, 9342 were coupes, and 5420 were roadsters.

== 1950 ==
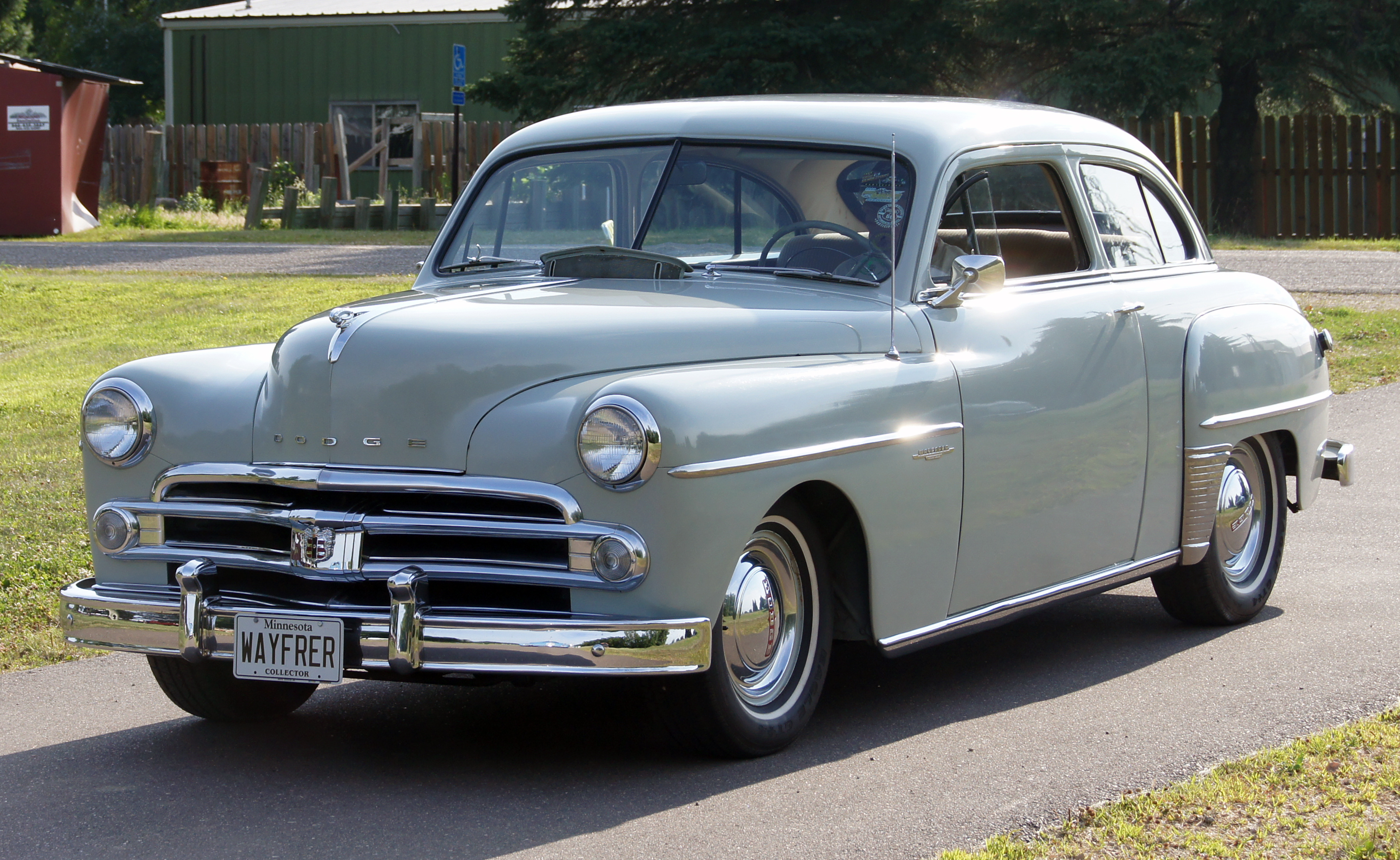
A 1950 Dodge Wayfarer two-door sedan

For 1950, the D-33 Wayfarers (as for the entire Dodge lineup) received a facelift with a sleeker grille, new bumpers, and new rear fenders with the taillights mounted directly on them. Mid-year, the roadster was renamed Sportabout as Chrysler realized that very few "true" roadsters were sold. The Sportabout, unlike the rest of the Wayfarer line, also received a body moulding which extended onto the front doors.

A disastrous 104-day strike, lasting from 25 January until 8 May, hamstrung all of Chrysler's production this year. Meanwhile, the arrival of the Rambler Landau convertible meant serious competition for the roadster. While a little more expensive, the new Rambler was much more comprehensively equipped and could seat five rather than two people. Business coupe production also dropped, although the sedan increased for a better overall than in 1949. 75,403 were built, made up of 65,000 sedans, 7500 coupes, and 2903 roadsters/Sportabouts.

== 1951-1952 ==
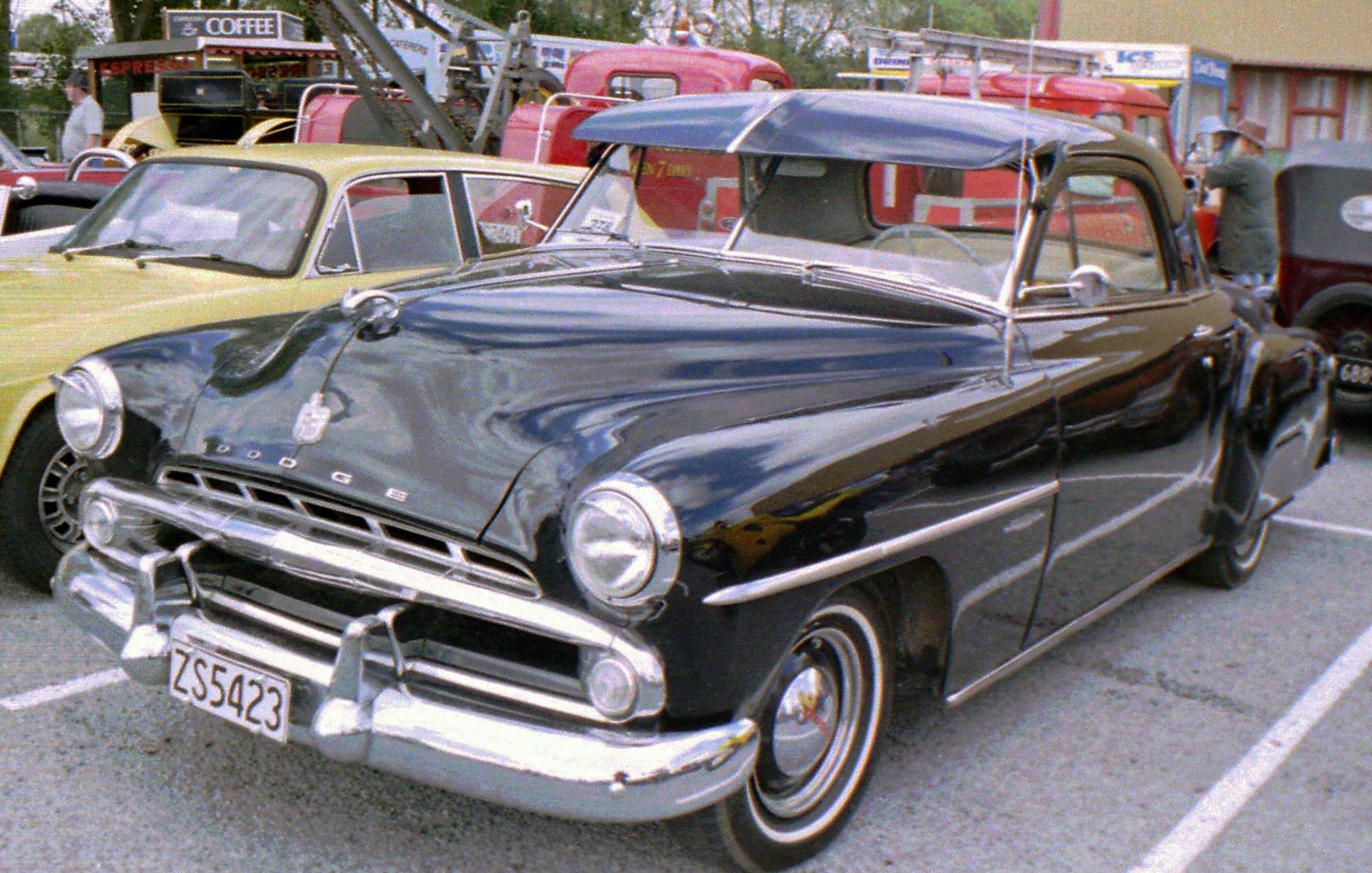
1952 Dodge Wayfarer business coupe

1951's D-41 Wayfarers received a thorough upgrade, with a new hood, front fenders, and new slotted grille in two sections. The windshield was bigger and the dashboard new, and underneath there were new "Oriflow" shock absorbers. 1951 was the last year that the Sportabout was available with the removable side windows. A period road tester (Tom McCahill, for Mechanix Illustrated) reached a 87 mph (140 km/h) top speed, and sixty mph from standing was reached in 17.4 seconds.

The 1952s were nearly identical to the 1951s, with Dodge not even bothering to separate the yearly sales numbers. When the 1952s were introduced, the Sportabout was listed with an asterisk regarding availability but was not produced. The business coupe was discontinued in February 1952, with material shortages due to the Korean War forcing automobile manufacturers to focus on their more popular models. Thus, only the two-door sedan was available for most of the Wayfarer's last model year. Production for 1951 and 1952 totalled 78,404, of which 70,700 were sedans, 6702 business coupes, and a mere 1002 of the 1951 Sportabouts. For 1953, the "Meadowbrook Special" series was added to replace the Wayfarer at the lower end of Dodge's lineup.

== Chrysler Wayfarer ==
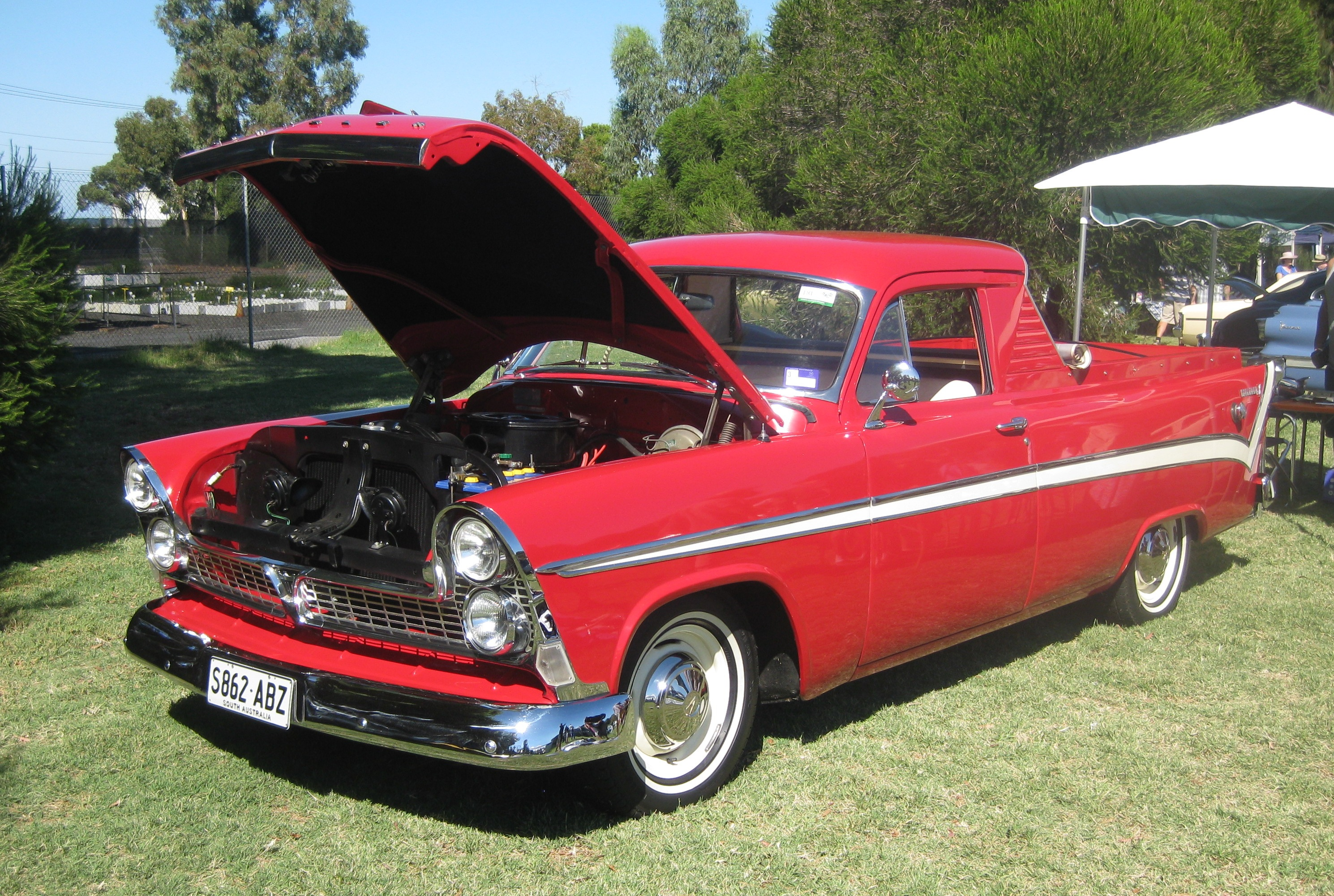
Chrysler AP3 Wayfarer

The Wayfarer model name was also used by Chrysler Australia for the Chrysler Wayfarer, a series of coupé utility models built between late 1958 and 1960 (AP2 and AP3 models, some perhaps built as late as 1961) in 1205 examples. Later, there was a coupé utility called the "Chrysler Valiant Wayfarer". This model was built from April 1965 until August 1971.

== See also ==
- Dodge Meadowbrook
- Dodge Coronet

== Works cited ==
- Godshall, Jeffrey I. (1980). "Wayward Wayfarer: The story of a Dodge". Automobile Quarterly. XVIII (1, first quarter 1980). Princeton, NJ: 72–81. ISSN 0005-1438.
