= Dodge Meadowbrook =

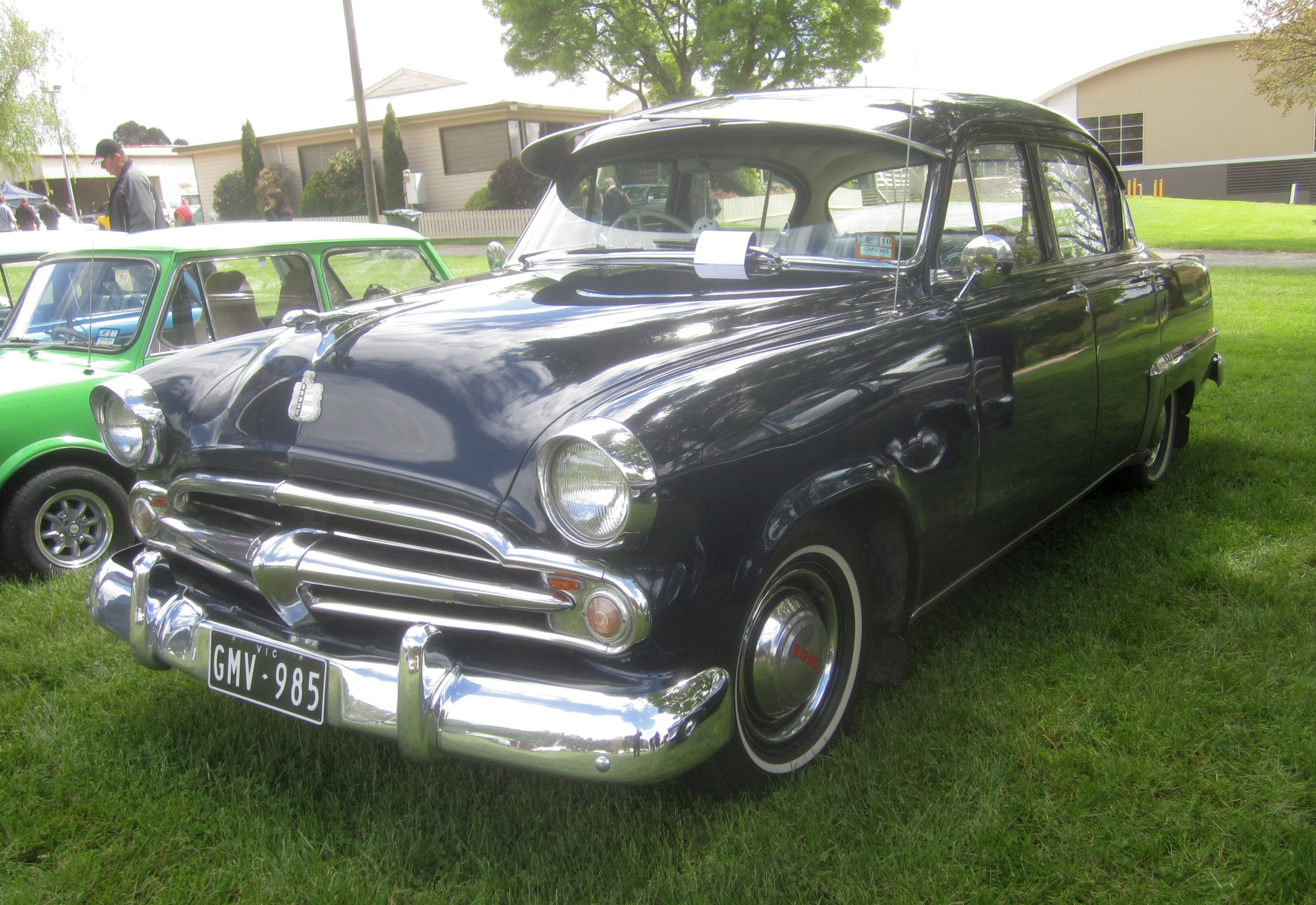
- 1954 Dodge Meadowbrook

Overview
- Manufacturer: Dodge (Chrysler)
- Production: 1949–1954
- Assembly: United States: Hamtramck, Michigan (Dodge Main Factory)

Body and chassis
- Class: Full-size
- Body style: 2-door sedan (1953–1954); 4-door sedan 2-door station wagon (1953)
- Layout: FR layout
- Related: DeSoto Deluxe; DeSoto Powermaster; DeSoto Firedome; Plymouth Cranbrook

Powertrain
- Engine: 3.8 L (3773 cc; 230.2 cu in) L-head I6; 4.0 L (3955 cc; 241.3 cu in) Red Ram hemi V8

Dimensions
- Wheelbase: 123.5 in (3,137 mm) (1949–1952); 114 in (2,896 mm) (1953 Suburban); 119 in (3,023 mm) (1953–1954)
- Length: 203.6 in (5,171 mm) (1949); 205.5 in (5,220 mm) (1954)
- Width: 74 in (1,880 mm) (1949), 73.5 in (1,867 mm) (1954)

The Dodge Meadowbrook is a full-size car that was produced by Dodge in the United States from 1949 to 1954.

== History ==
The Dodge Meadowbrook was produced by Dodge and offered as the midline trim level from February 1949 until 1954, above the Wayfarer and beneath the Coronet. The Meadowbrook was largely identical to the Coronet, excepting trim and equipment differences. In 1952 the Wayfarer was cancelled and the Meadowbrook became the lowest-priced Dodge in the United States; export markets (including Canada) continued to receive the Plymouth-based Dodge Kingsway.

=== 1949 ===
In its first year the four-door only Meadowbrook made up 30% of Dodge's sales (about 90,000 units), and came with "Safe-Guard Hydraulic Brakes" which included two cylinders per front brake. Dodge also advertised a new "cradled" ride, which was supposedly softer than all the others makers cars. The single-barrel inline-six produced 103 hp (77 kW).

=== 1950 ===
For 1950, the six-cylinder was baptized the "Get-Away" engine. After the late introduction of the 1949s, the 1950 Dodges appeared a little earlier, on 4 January 1950. The 1950 Meadowbrook has a wide, 42.7 ft (13.0 m) turning circle. Four-door sedan bodywork remained the only option. The main transmission option available was different than that of the same model year Coronet, being a 3-speed Chrysler Fluid Drive transmission as compared to the gyromatic from the 1950 Coronet.

=== 1951 ===
The 1951 Meadowbrook received a thorough change, with all-new front skin. Bumpers were also new, as was the dashboard, and the windshield was enlarged. The engine remained unchanged, as it would until 1954. The 1951 maintained the 3-speed fluid drive transmission, which remained unchanged until 1954.

=== 1952 ===
In 1952, the Meadowbrook made up 32.50% of Dodge's sales (circa 84,000). With Chrysler being entirely focussed on the Korean War effort, the 1952s received almost no changes - modifications being limited to details such as a red reflector dot beneath the taillights and lightly redesigned hubcaps. The 1952s were introduced on 10 November 1951.

=== 1953 ===
The 1953 Dodges arrived on 23 October 1952, and featured a revised bodywork based on the 1952s. The doors (now with pull-handles) opened wider, the rear window was a one-piece, and the taillights were oval units. Naturally the grille and chrome applications were altered. The "Meadowbrook Special" series was added to replace the Wayfarer at the lower end of Dodge's lineup. A two-door model and a station wagon were also added. The two- and four-door sedans were both offered in both Meadowbrook and Special trim levels, but the Special did not suit the buoyant US car market and by April 1953 it had already been discontinued. Instead, sales of the new V8-engined Coronet were very strong. The austere Special, intended for travelling salesmen and the like, received no chrome side trim and plain rubber trim around the windows. The interior was equally bare.

The two-door Suburban wagon, offered for 1953 only, sat on a shorter 114 in (2,900 mm) wheelbase than the sedans.

=== 1954 ===
1954 was the last year of the Meadowbrook, and it had a new Powerflite automatic. Offered as a four-door or two-door sedan (called Club Coupé), it was now also available with the optional new "Red Ram" Hemi V8 engine. Of 241.3 cu in (4.0 L), it produces 140 hp (104 kW) for the Meadowbrook, ten horsepower less than in the more senior Dodges due to a lower compression ratio. Thanks to a modest compression increase, the "230" six increased its power output to 110 hp (82 kW). Buyers still flocked to the more prestigious Coronet and Royal lines, and only 15,444 were built.

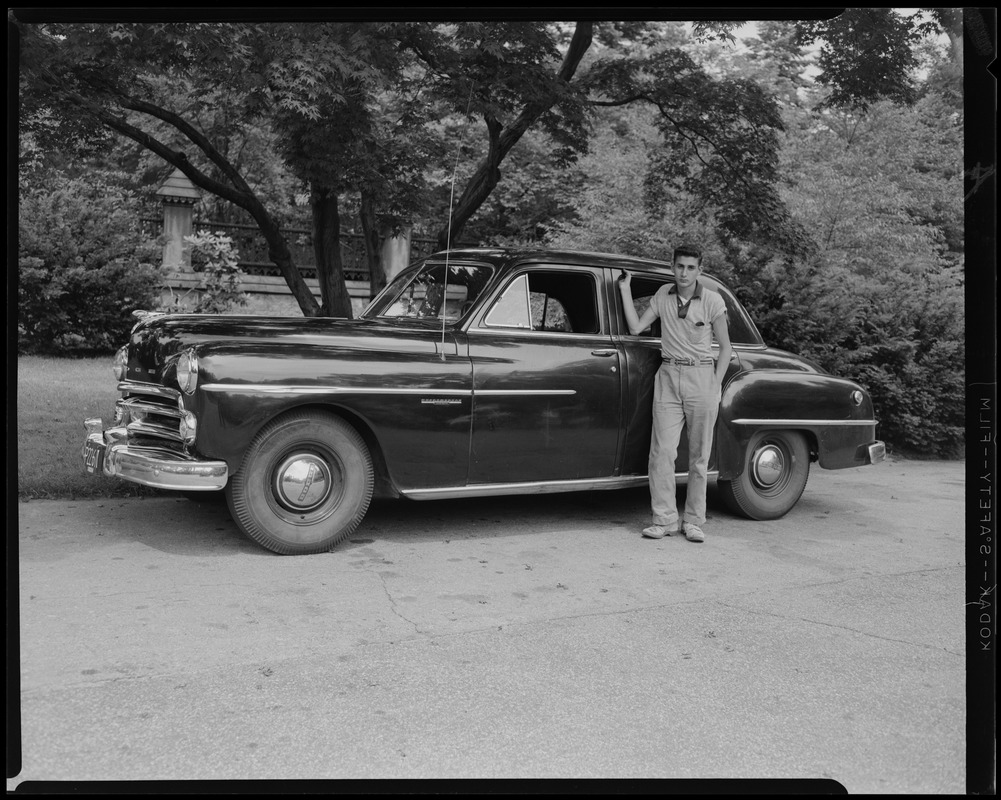
1950 Dodge Meadowbrook

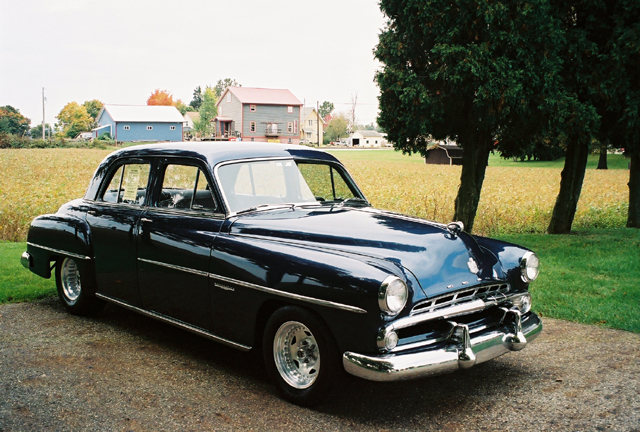
1952 Dodge Meadowbrook (with non-standard wheels)

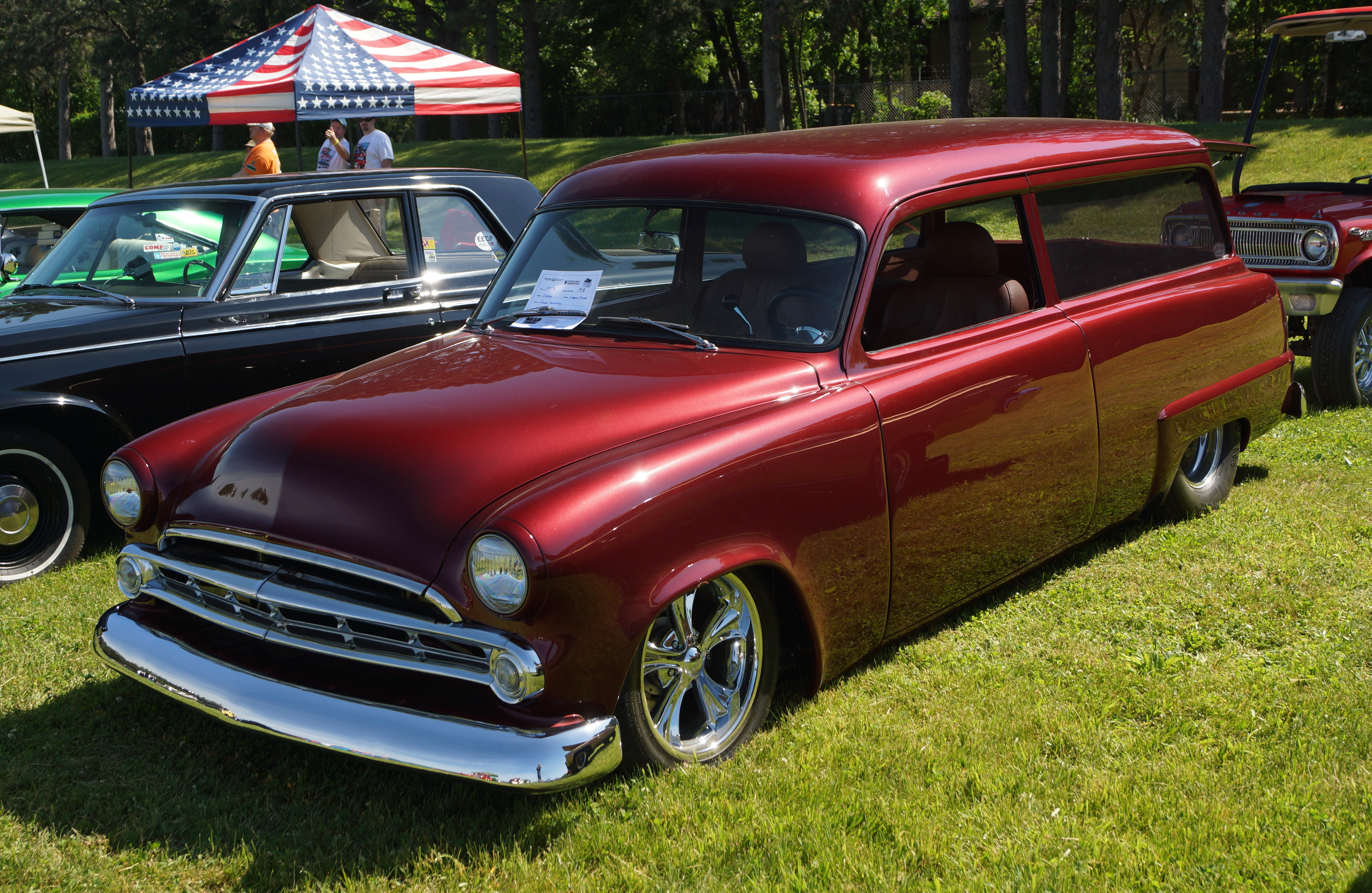
Modified 1953 Dodge Meadowbrook Suburban

== See also ==
- Dodge Coronet
