= Dodge Regent =

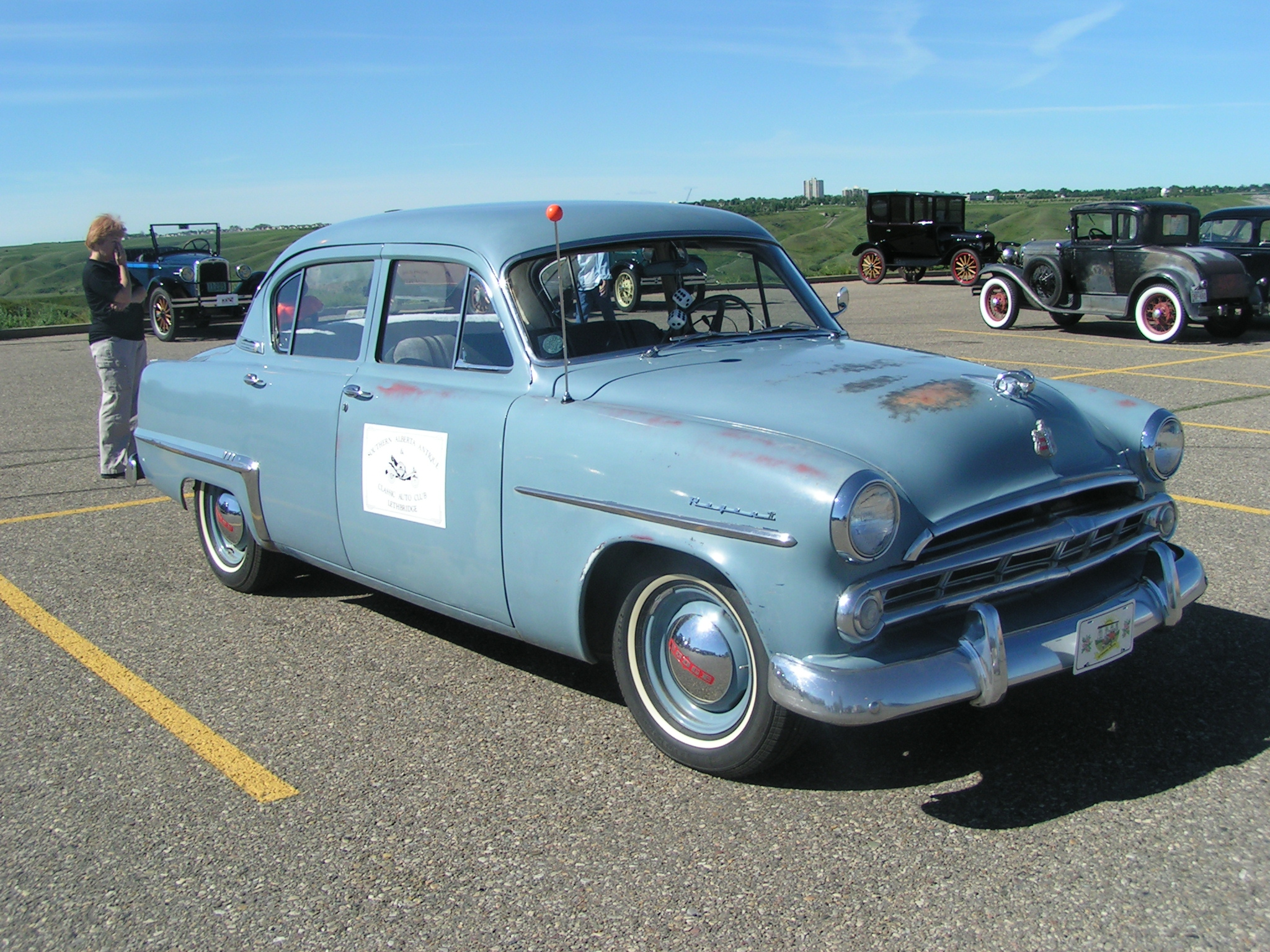
- 1953 Dodge Regent 4-Door Sedan

Overview
- Manufacturer: Dodge (Chrysler)
- Production: 1951–1959
- Assembly: Windsor, Ontario, Canada

Body and chassis
- Class: Full-size
- Body style: 2-door coupe 4-door sedan
- Layout: FR layout

Powertrain
- Engine: 218 cu in (3.6 L) I6 (1951); 228 cu in (3.7 L) I6 (1952-54); 250.6 cu in (4.1 L) I6 (1955-58); 277 cu in (4.5 L) V8 (1956-58); 251 cu in (4.1 L) I6 (1959); 313 cu in (5.1 L) V8 (1959)
- Transmission: 2-speed automatic 3-speed manual

The Dodge Regent is an automobile that was built by Dodge Canada. The low-priced line built with a front end similar to the U.S. market Dodge attached to a Plymouth body.

== History ==
The first Dodge Regent appeared for 1951, basically a Plymouth Cranbrook, and replaced the Special DeLuxe name used from 1942 through 1950. As with all Canadian Plymouths and Dodges from 1938 to 1959, the Dodge Regent used Chrysler big block (25") flathead inline-six engine. While the American Plymouth used the 23" block 217.6-cid engine, the Canadian Plymouth and Dodge used the 25" 218.1-cid engine. Body styles were club coupe, 4-door sedan and a new for 1951 model, the Mayfair hardtop.

The Regent continued for 1952 with minor trim changes while the 1953 models received new bodies. As the U.S. Dodge now shared bodies with Plymouth, the Canadian Dodge Regent and Crusader, as well as the export Kingsway, used the Plymouth body with a Dodge front clip. In April, 1953, Chrysler of Canada introduced Hy-Drive mated to a larger, 228.1-cid engine. As well, the Mayfair hardtop was spun off into its own series along with a 4-door sedan. 1954 models received grille, trim, taillamp and interior changes and very late in the model year Powerflite automatic transmission became an option. 1954 options include those with two-doors.

New styling for 1955 appeared across the Chrysler Corporation makes, and Dodge Regent continued to be a Plymouth Savoy with a Dodge front clip. Chrysler of Canada imported polyhead V8 short blocks for use in Canadian Plymouth Belvedere and Dodge Mayfair models. The lower-priced series, Crusader and Regent, came only with the flathead six, either 228.1-cid if mated to the 3-speed manual or 250.6-cid with the Powerflite automatic.

For 1956 new fins graced the rear fenders and Chrysler Canada opened a new engine plant for V8 production. The plant produced 277-cid engines for Plymouth and Dodge and 303-cid engines for Canadian Dodge Custom Royal and Chrysler Windsor models. The Regent was available with either the flathead six, now 250.6-cid, or the V8, except for the new 2-door hardtop which came only with the six. 1956 would prove to be a high-water mark for Canadian Dodge production, breaking the 50,000 mark for the first time.

Completely new Forward Look bodies appeared for 1957 - lower, wider, longer. But due to the rush to get it into production, the bodies were plagued with tooling errors, parts mismatch, and poor body engineering. For 1958 the Regent continued on as in 1957, adding a 4-door hardtop.

1959 was the final year for the Dodge Regent, and as Plymouth placed the Fury on top and bumped the other series down a rung, so did Dodge in Canada. The new top series was now Viscount, while Mayfair moved down to the middle series and Regent to the bottom. The Crusader name was dropped. Body styles available were 2-door and 4-door sedans and Suburban wagons. Engines were the 251 flathead six and 313 poly V8. For the third year in row, Canadian Dodge production was down although the Regent remained the most popular Dodge series in Canada.

Dodge introduced the Dart for 1960, and the new Dodge Dart Seneca replaced the Dodge Regent in Canadian Dodge-DeSoto dealer showrooms.

== Collections ==
There is a 1957 Dodge Regent in the Canadian Automotive Museum.

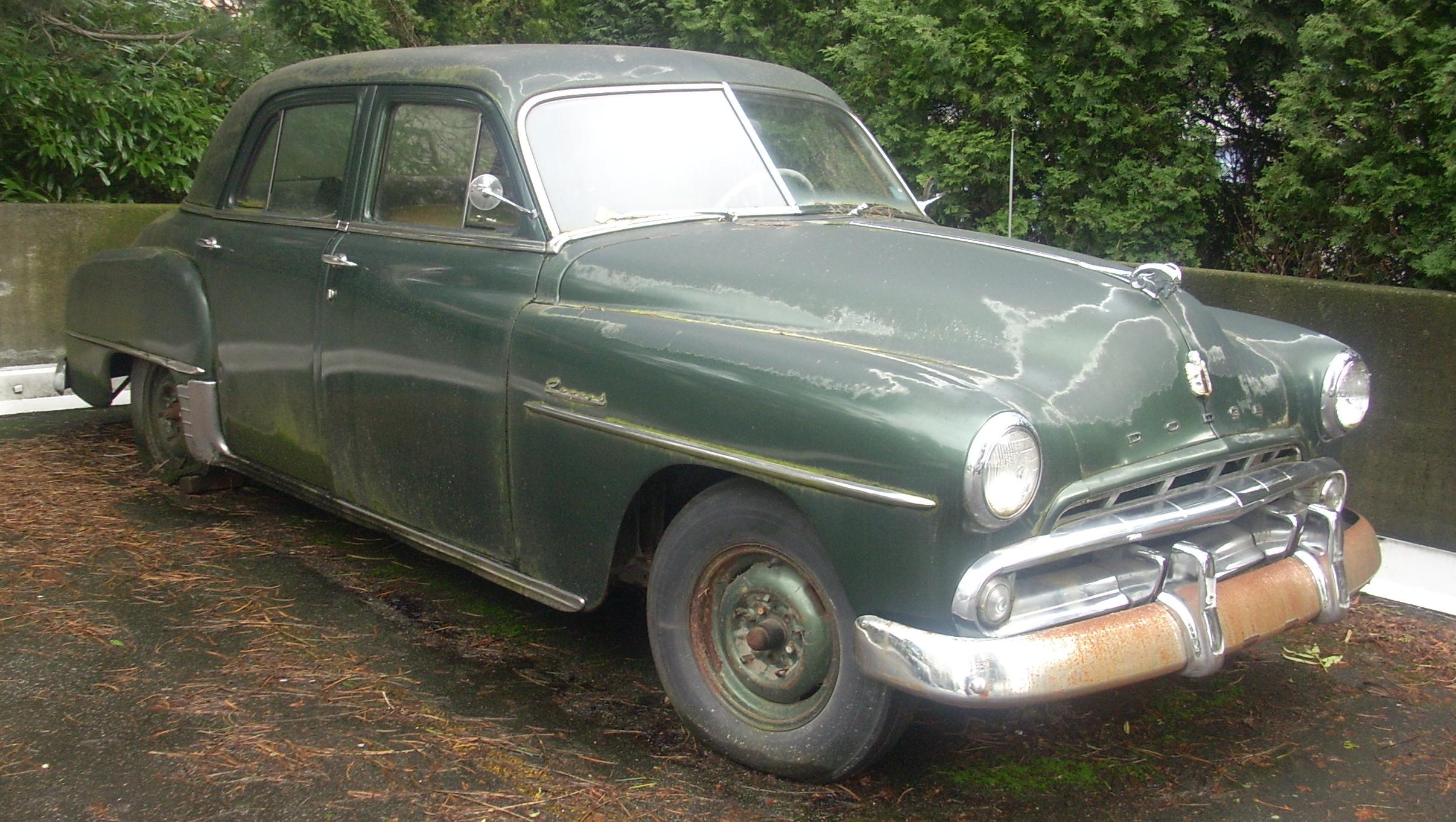
1951 Dodge Regent 4-Door Sedan

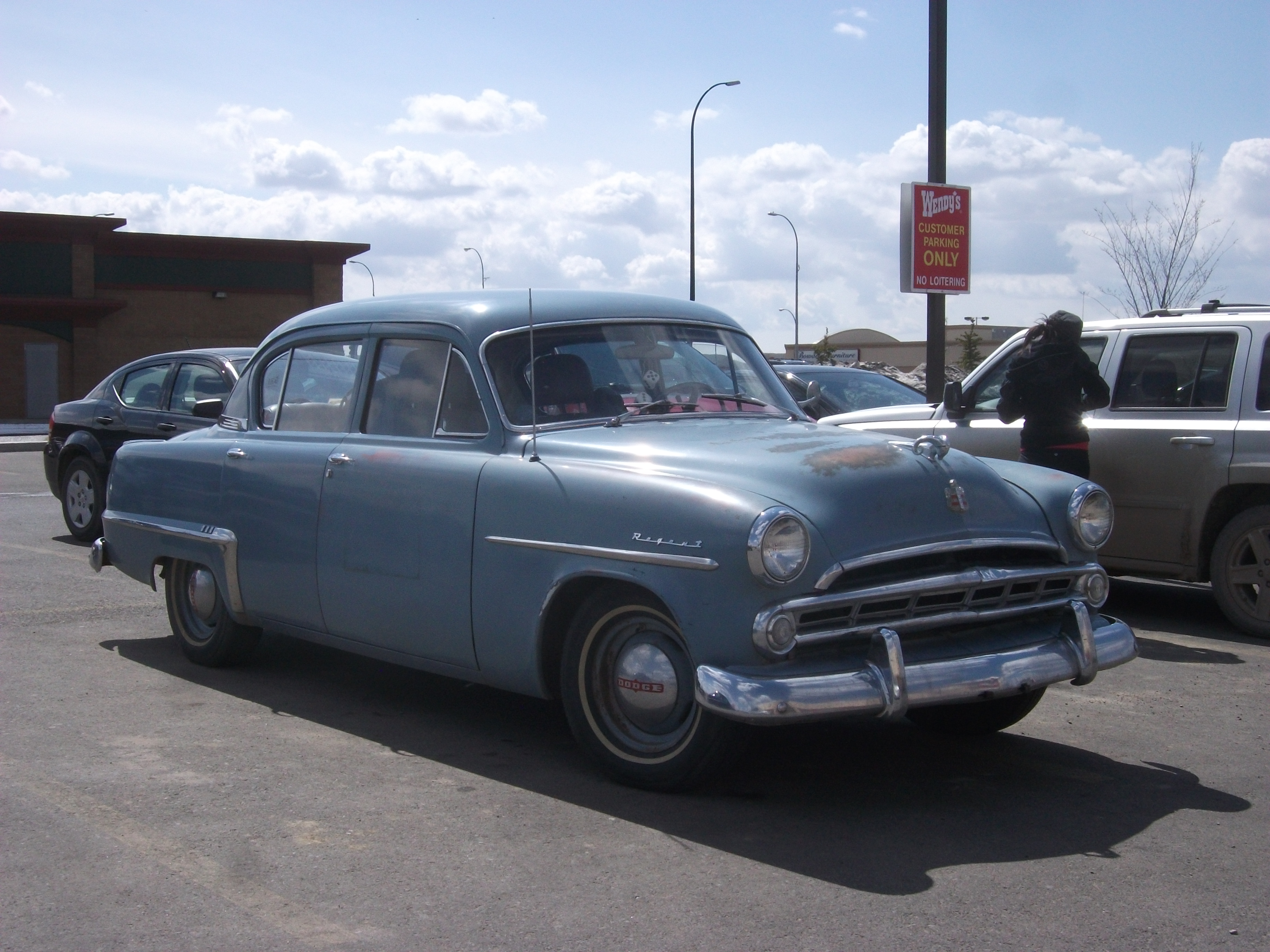
1953 Dodge Regent 4-Door Sedan

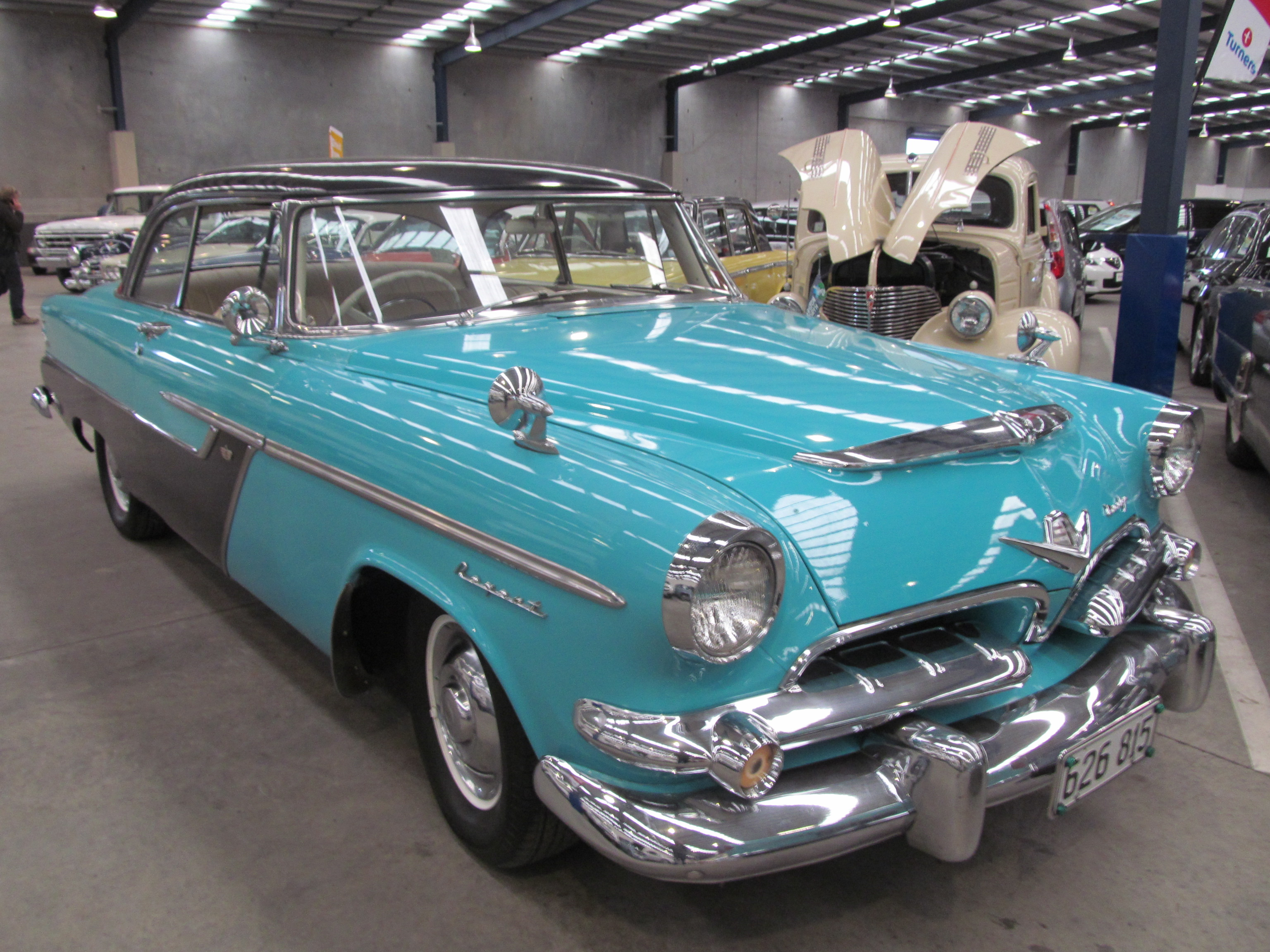
1955 Dodge Regent Hardtop

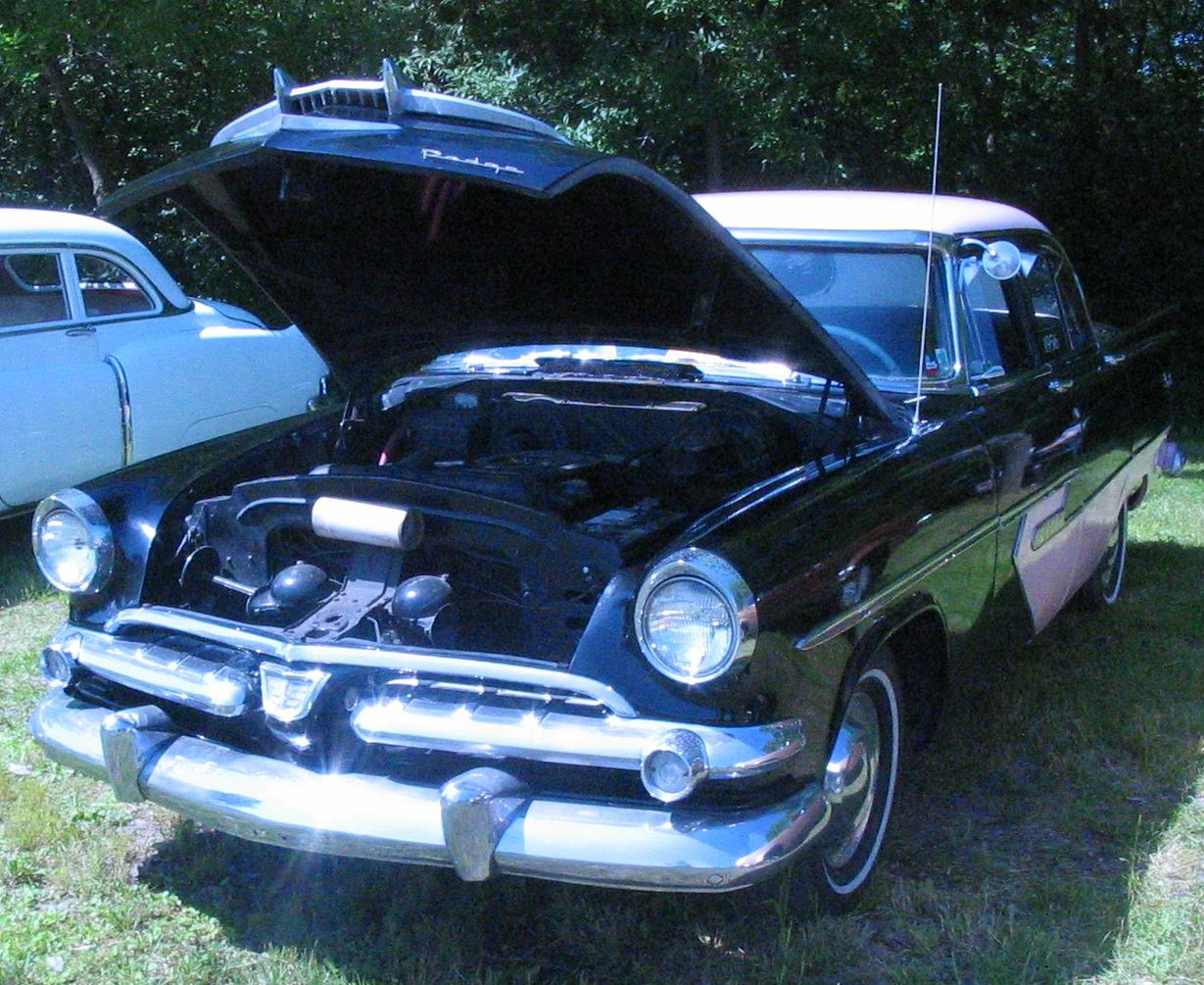
1956 Dodge Regent Four-door Sedan

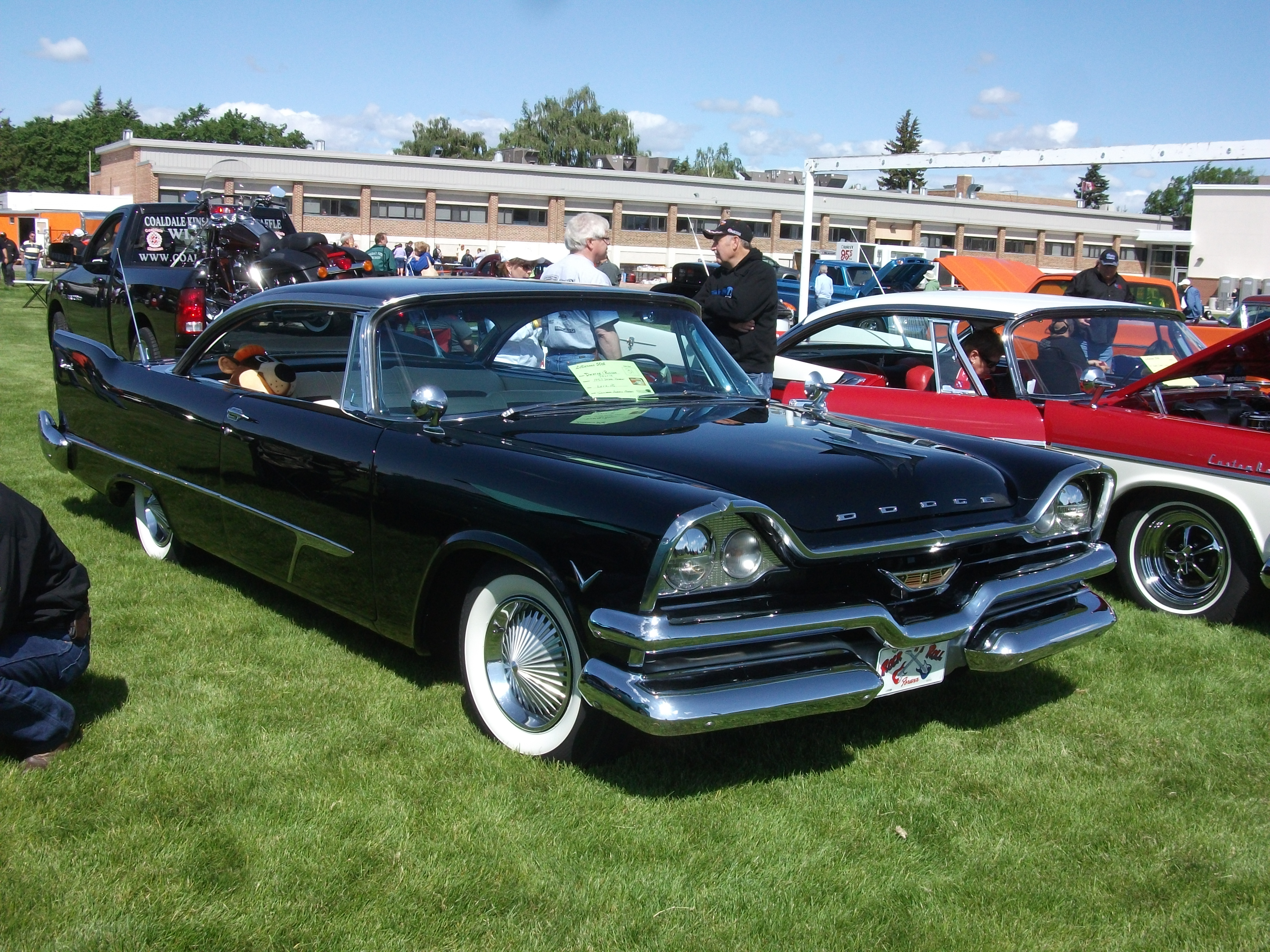
1957 Dodge Regent 2-Door Matador

1959 Dodge Regent 4-Door Sedan
