= Dodge Crusader =

Automobile built by Dodge Canada

The Dodge Crusader is an automobile built by Dodge Canada. Initially introduced in 1951, the original Crusader was a rebadged Plymouth Cambridge fitted with a long-block 218 cu in (3,572 cc) flathead-six engine. For 1954, the Crusader nameplate was switched to a rebadged version of the Plymouth Plaza, and it remained in production until 1958.
