= Dodge Kingsway =

Car manufactured by Dodge for export markets

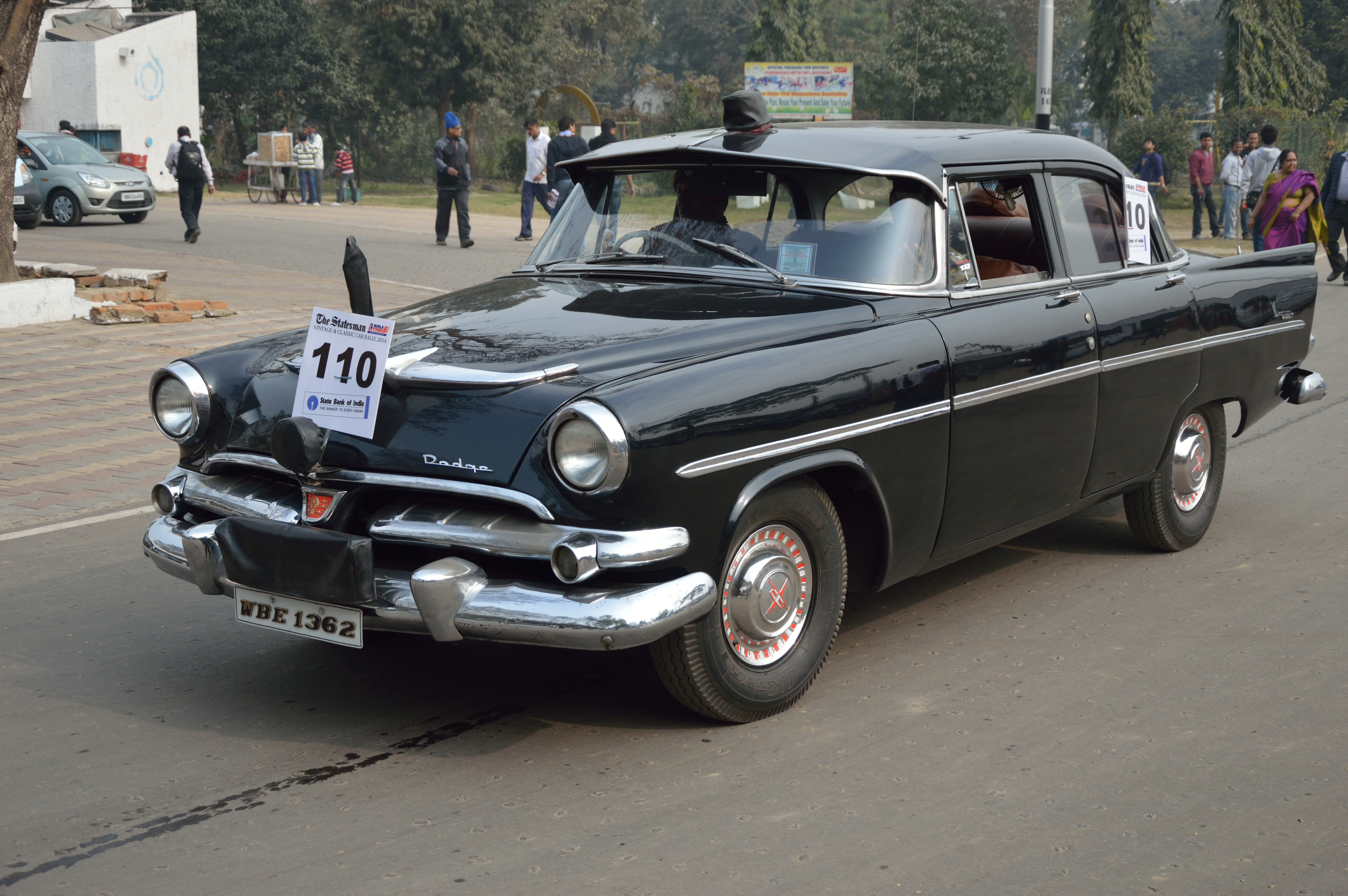
- 1956 Dodge Kingsway 4-door sedan (India)

Overview
- Manufacturer: Dodge (Chrysler)
- Production: 1940–1959
- Assembly: Canada: Windsor, Ontario (Windsor Assembly); Australia: Mile End (Chrysler Australia); Belgium: Antwerp; India: Mumbai (Premier Automobiles); New Zealand: Petone (Todd Motors); Sweden: Norrköping (ANA)

Body and chassis
- Class: Full-size
- Body style: 2-door hardtop 2-door convertible 4-door hardtop 4-door sedan
- Layout: FR layout
- Related: Plymouth Deluxe; Plymouth Plaza; Plymouth Savoy; Plymouth Fury; Plymouth Belvedere

Powertrain
- Transmission: 3-speed manual 3-speed Torqueflite automatic

Dimensions
- Wheelbase: 111 in (2,819 mm) (1949–1952)

Chronology
- Successor: Dodge Dart (some markets)

The Dodge Kingsway is an automobile built by Dodge for export markets. The Kingsway name was adopted for the 1940 models. Before that, the export models based on Plymouths had no unique model names.

Kingsways were rebadged Plymouth vehicles, although they were often equipped with Dodge bumpers and trim. They were supposed to help overseas Dodge dealers to sell cars in a lower price class. The first export models were made in 1935, and they continued through the 1959 model year, with many different body styles and variations depending on the market they were intended for and which Plymouth models were available at the time.

== Versions ==
The Kingsway was the lowest-priced Plymouth Deluxe model in 1949–1952 (111 in or 2,820 mm wheelbase), 1954–1958 (based on Plymouth Plaza series) and 1959 (Plymouth Savoy). The Kingsway DeLuxe was based on the Plymouth DeLuxe (1946–50, 118 1/2 in, 3,010 mm wheelbase), Cambridge (1951–53), Savoy (1954–58) and Belvedere (1959). The top line Kingsway Custom was Dodge's version of the Plymouth Special DeLuxe (1946–50), Cranbrook (1951–53), Belvedere (1954–58) and Fury (1959). For 1959 only, the Kingsway offered a model based on the Sport Fury, the Kingsway Lancer.

With the introduction of the Dodge Dart for 1960, the Kingsway line was dropped.

== Introduction ==
The first use of the Kingsway name was in Canada for the 1940 model year (model D14), basically Dodge's rebadged version of the Plymouth. The base model came with one taillamp, one sunvisor and one windshield wiper - all on the driver's side. The body was Plymouth with Dodge nameplates, hood ornament and a grille that fit the Plymouth front end. Body styles were business coupe, 2-door and 4-door sedans.

The Kingsway name continued for the 1941 model year, on model D20. It was now available in two versions, base and Special. The Special was about $25 more than the base model. Body styles offered were the same as in 1940 with the addition of a 5-passenger coupe with fold-up (auxiliary) seats in the rear compartment.

For the 1942 model year, the Kingsway name was replaced by the DeLuxe, the same name as used on the base model Plymouth series. The DeLuxe was also the lowest priced Dodge for Canada from 1946 to 1950, although other export markets continued to use the Kingsway moniker.

Chrysler of Canada reintroduced the Kingsway name to the Canadian market for the 1951 model year, as the Canadian Dodge rebadged version of the Plymouth Concord, and replaced the DeLuxe name used on 111" wheelbase models in 1949-50.

The 1951 Kingsway offered a 2-door business coupe, 2-door fastback sedan, 2-door Suburban wagon and a 2-door Savoy wagon. The Savoy used interior and exterior trim similar to that used on higher priced models. The business coupe was dropped for the 1952 model year. As with the Plymouth Concord, the Canadian Dodge Kingsway was dropped for 1953.

The Kingsway, along with the Plymouth Savoy, were also assembled in Bombay, India by Premier Automobiles Limited until the late 1950s.

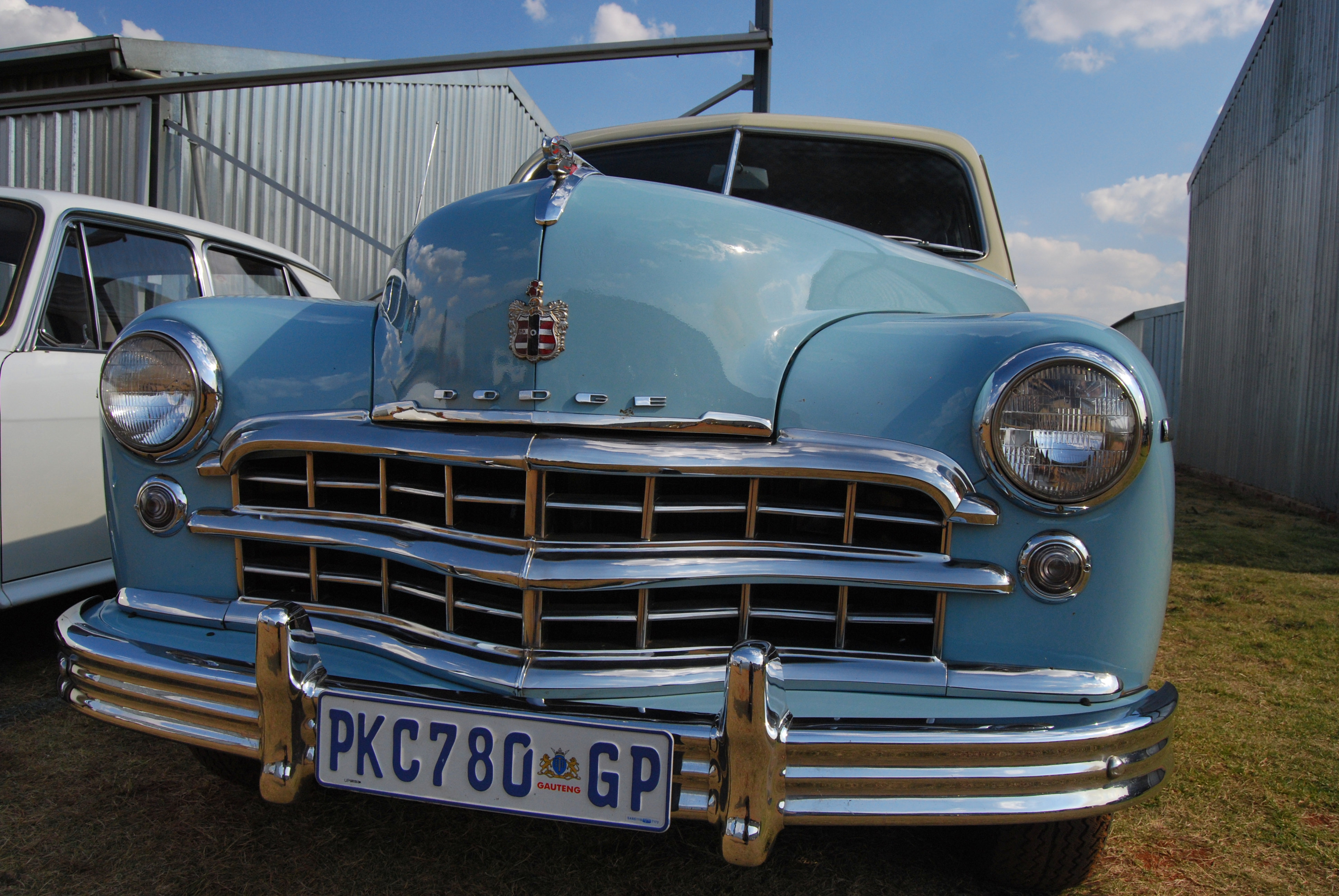
1949 Dodge Kingsway (South Africa)

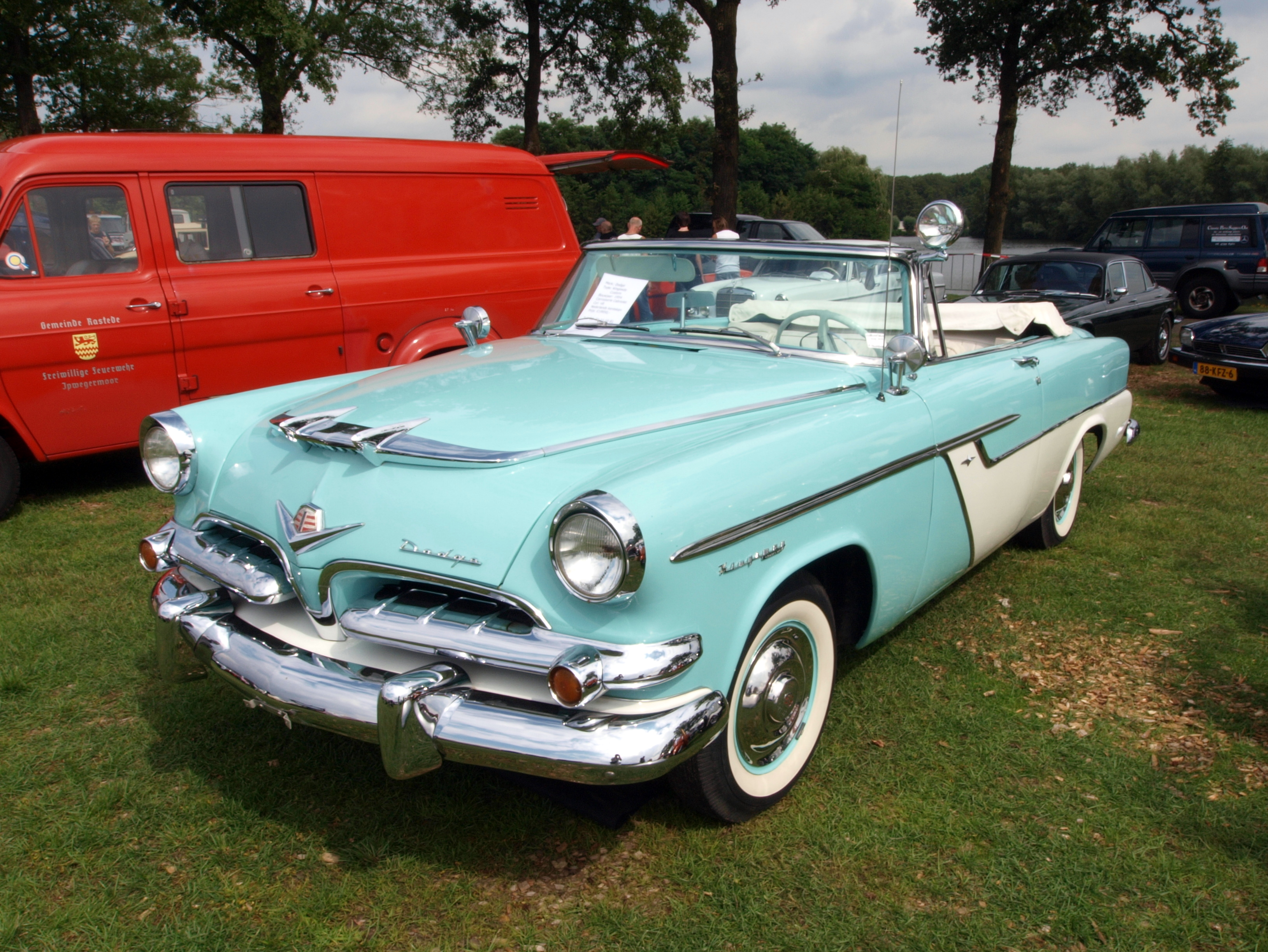
1955 Dodge Kingsway Custom Convertible (Canada)

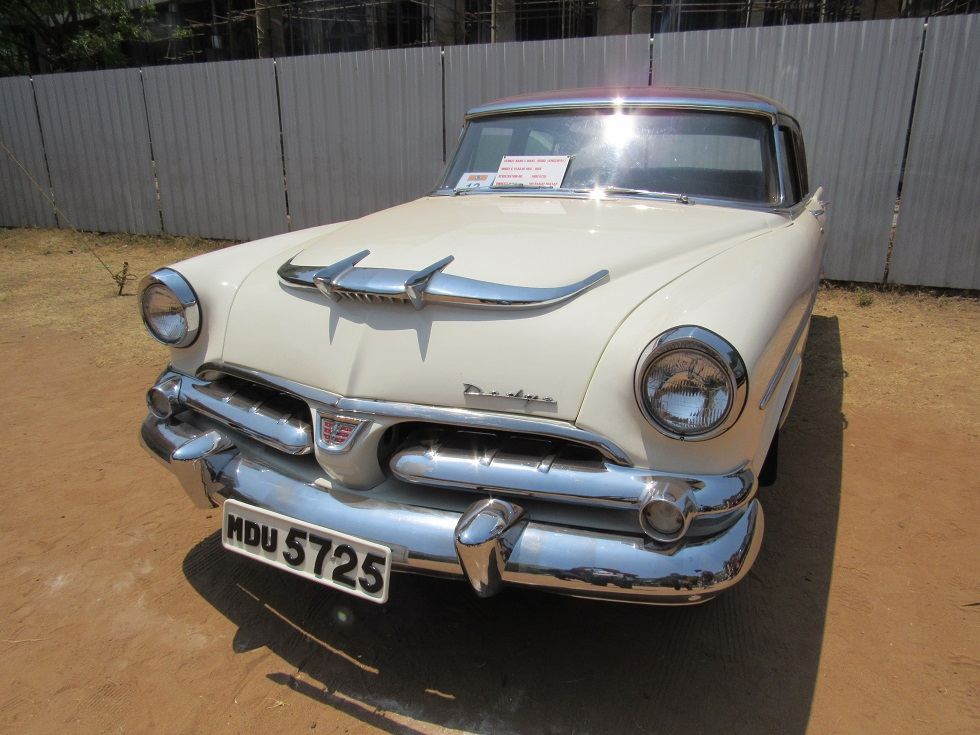
1956 Dodge Kingsway 4-door sedan (India)

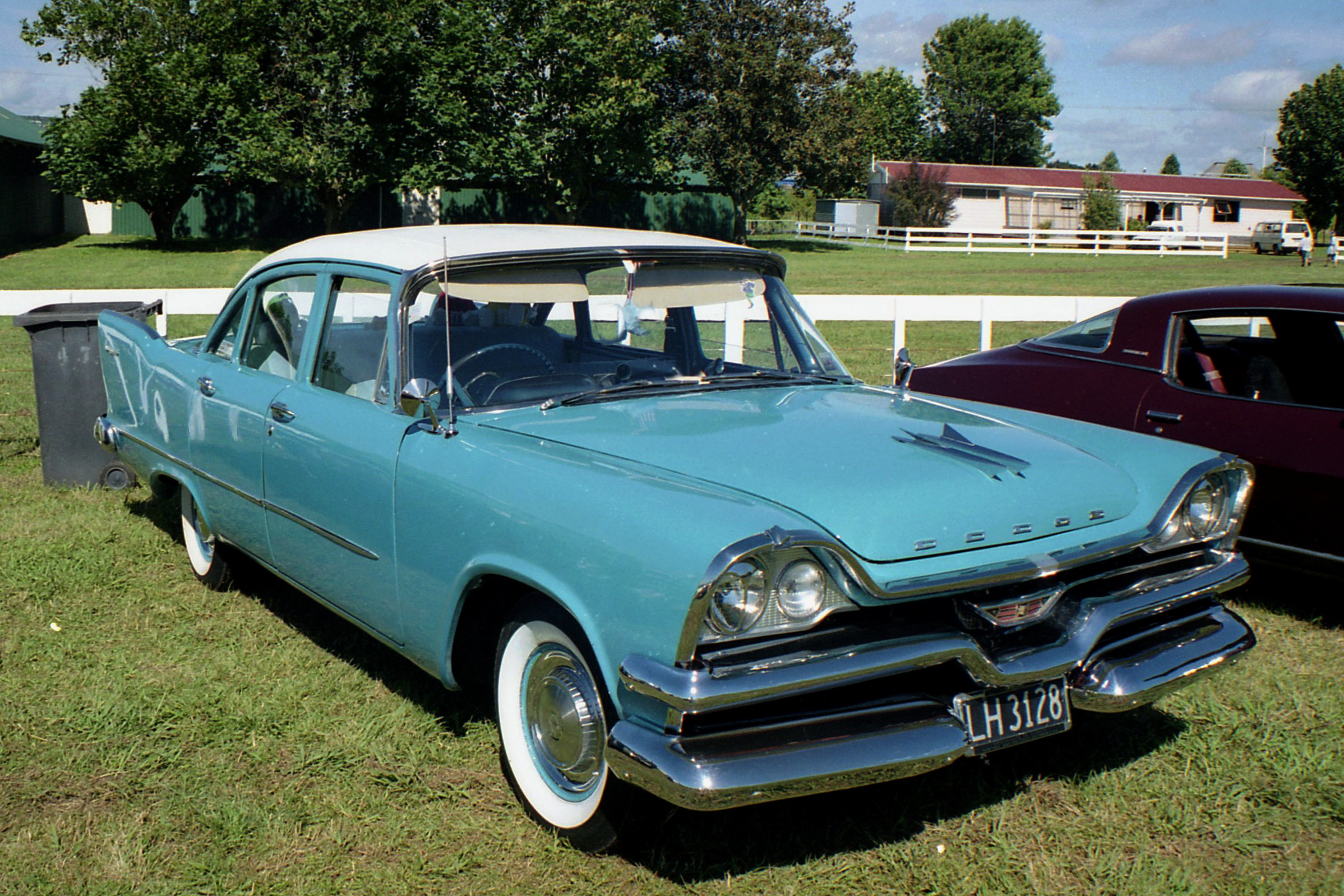
1957 Dodge Kingsway 4-door sedan (New Zealand)

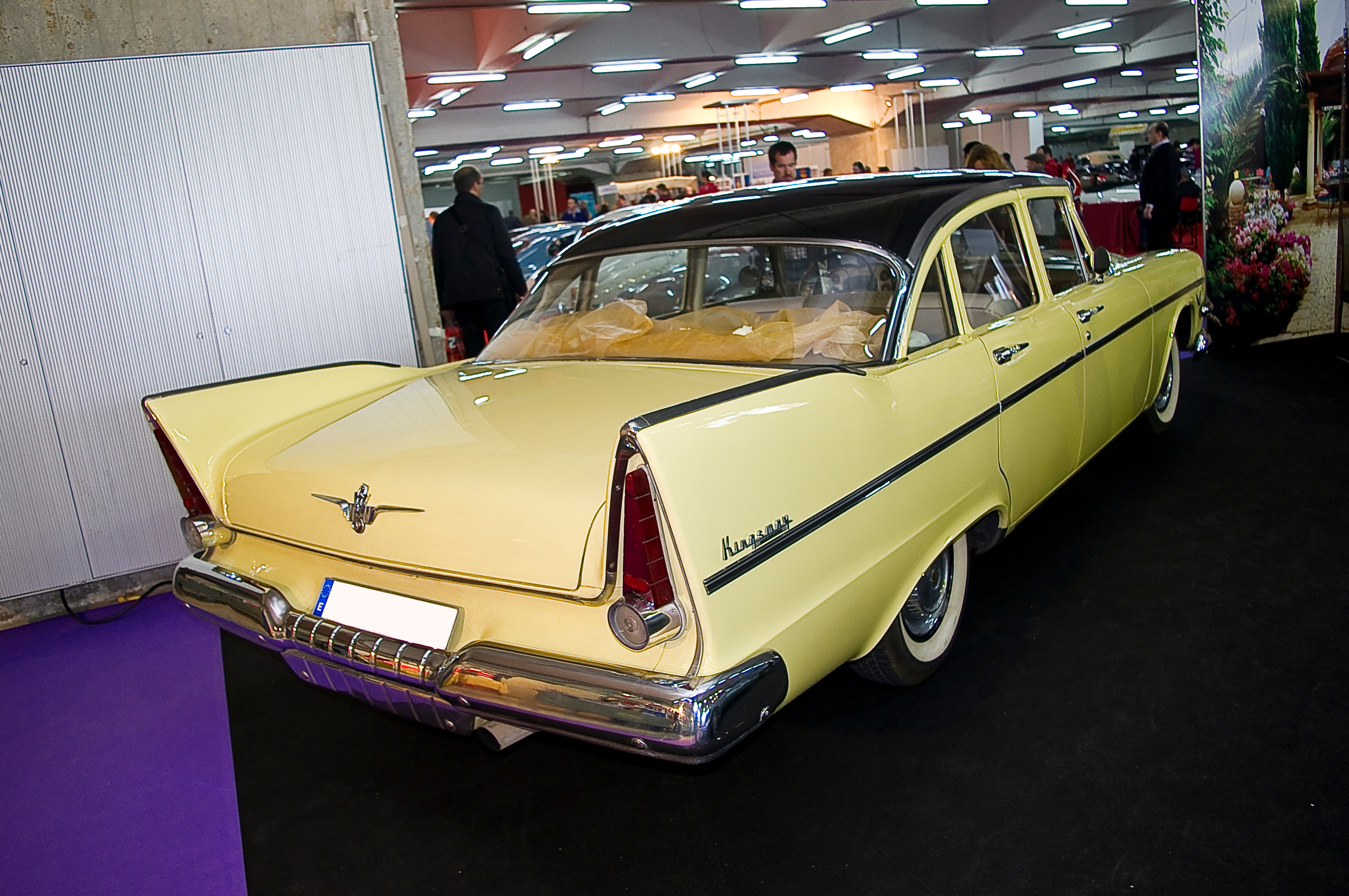
1957 Dodge Kingsway 4-door sedan (Spain)

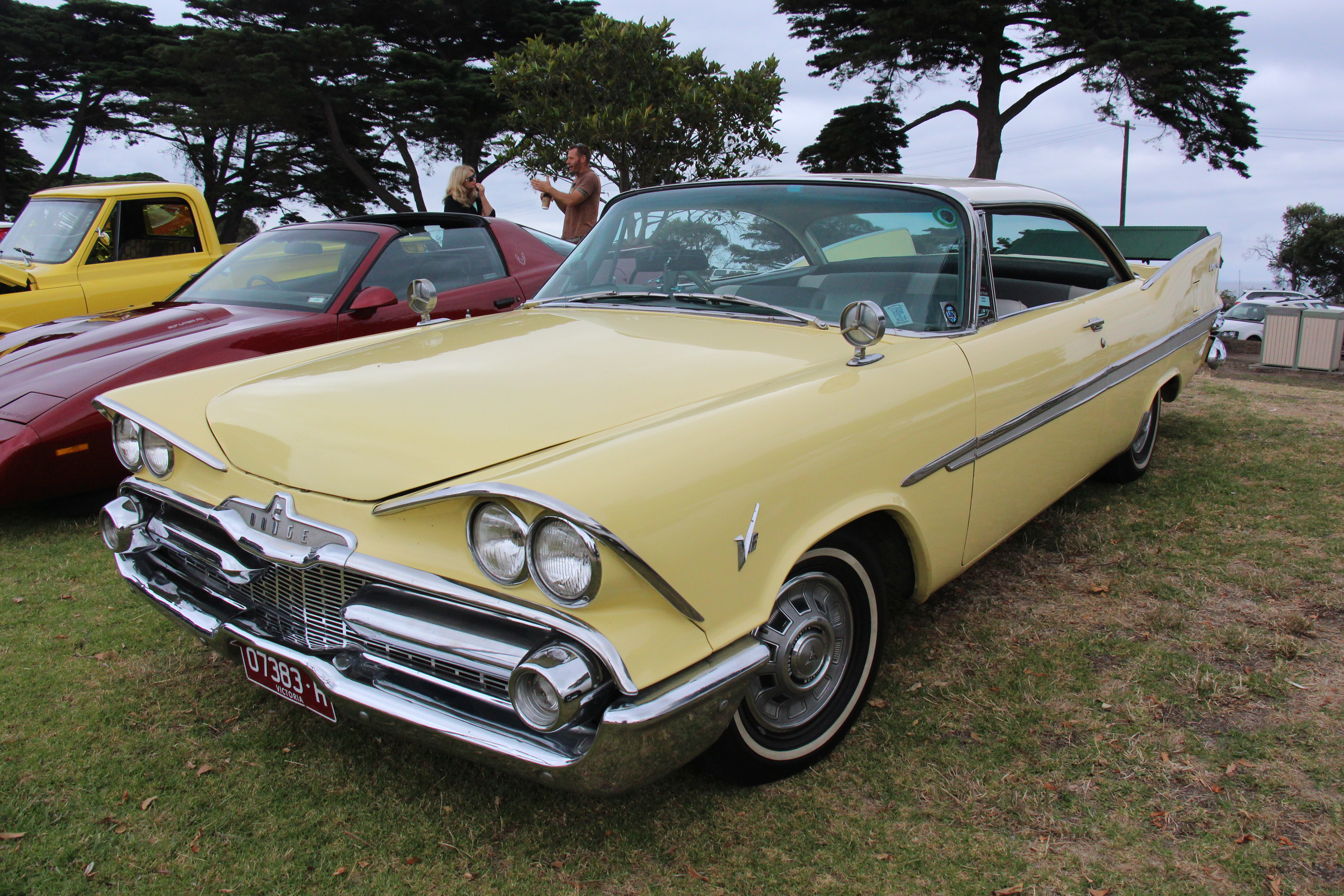
1959 Dodge Kingsway Custom Hardtop (Australia)

== Australian production ==
Chrysler Australia released the D43 series Kingsway in 1953 with all major panels pressed in Australia on Australian-made tooling. D49 series Kingsways were assembled from 1954 to 1957. The D49 Kingsway differed only in terms of grilles and badgework from the Plymouth P25 and DeSoto SP25 Diplomat models which were also assembled by Chrysler Australia. An Australian developed coupe utility variant of the Kingsway was introduced in 1956.

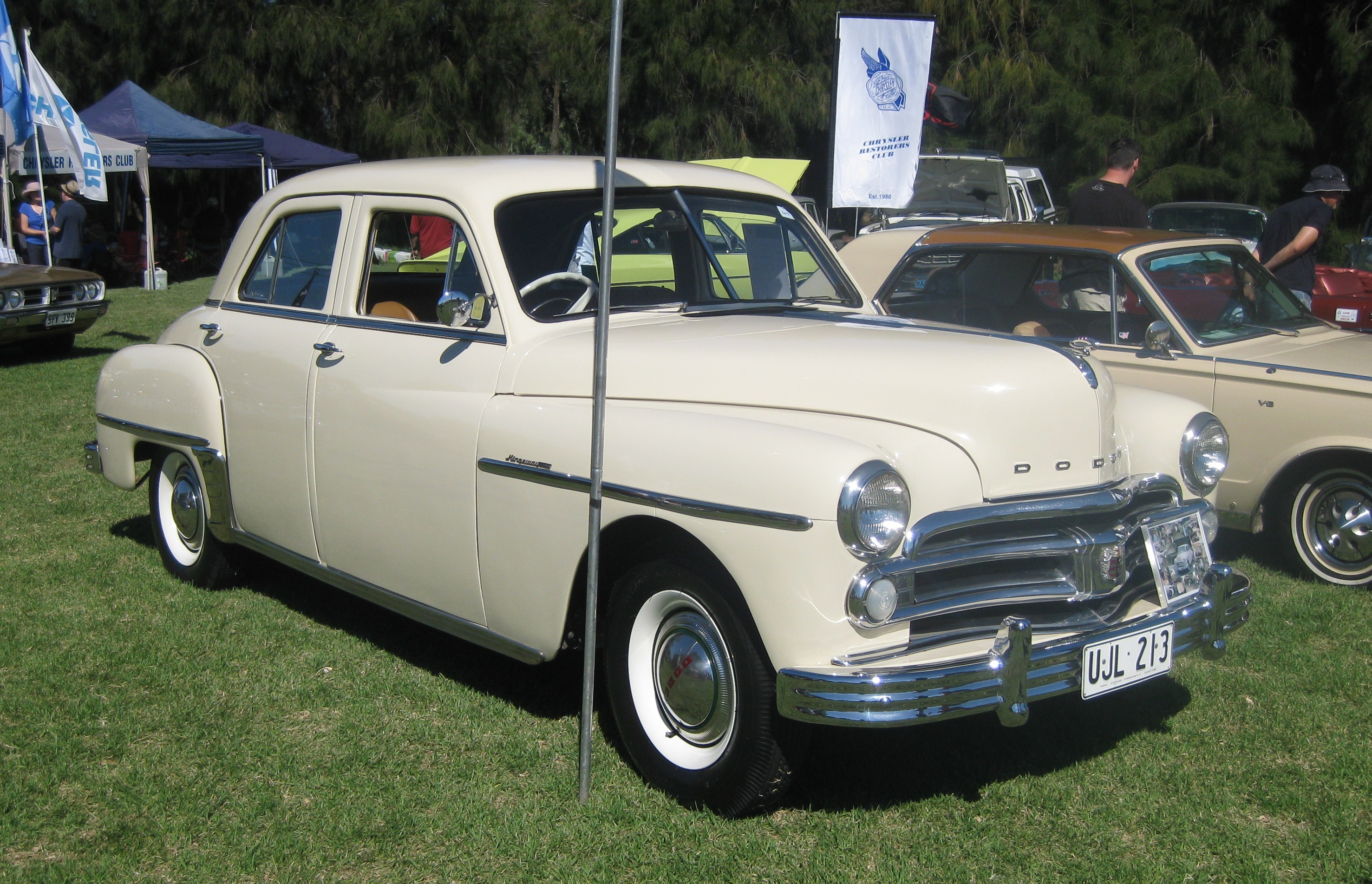
1950 Dodge Kingsway Custom (D36). Dodge D36 models were assembled in Australia by Chrysler Dodge Distributors Ltd, the predecessor of Chrysler Australia

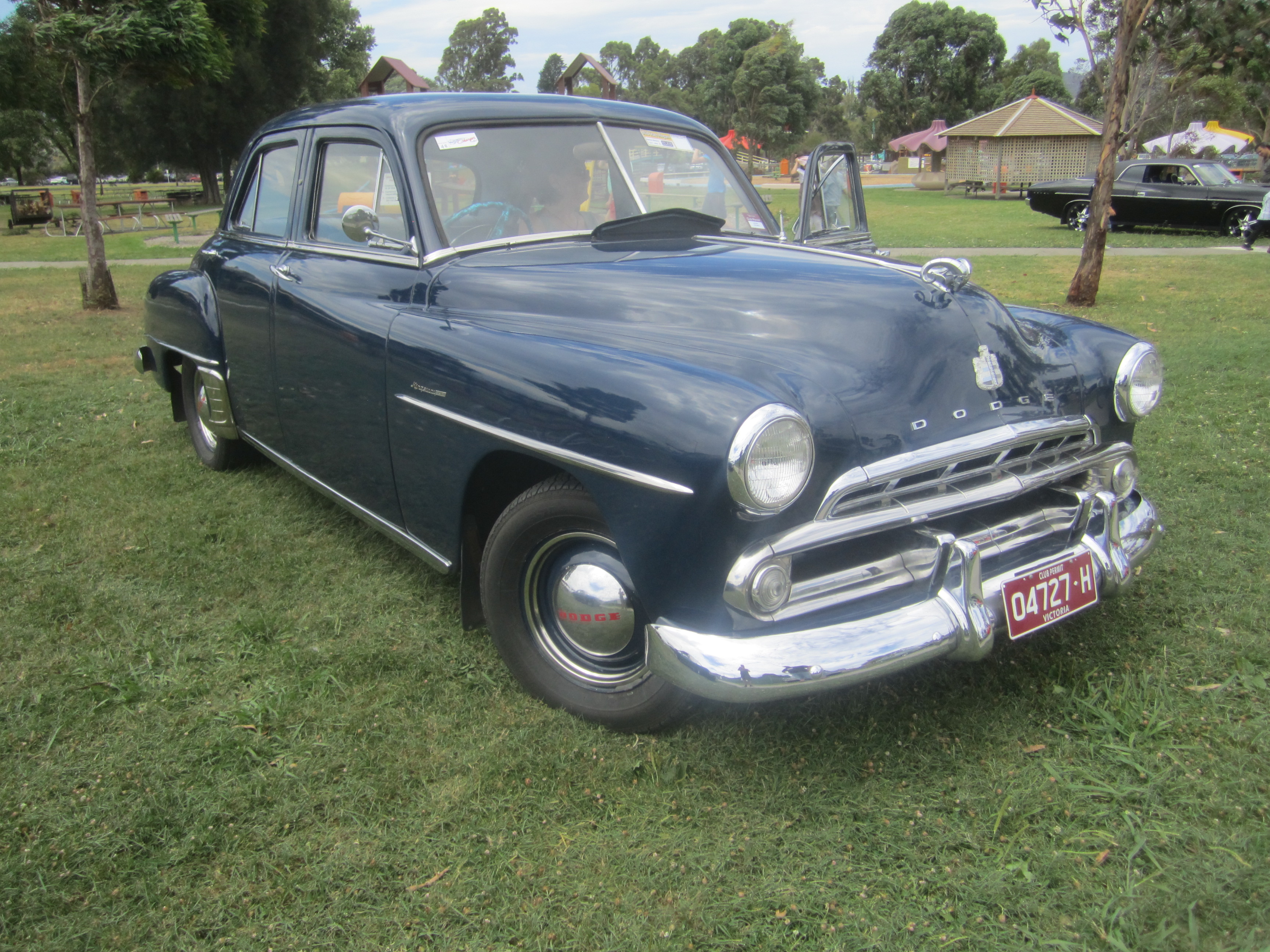
1952 Dodge Kingsway Sedan (D40)

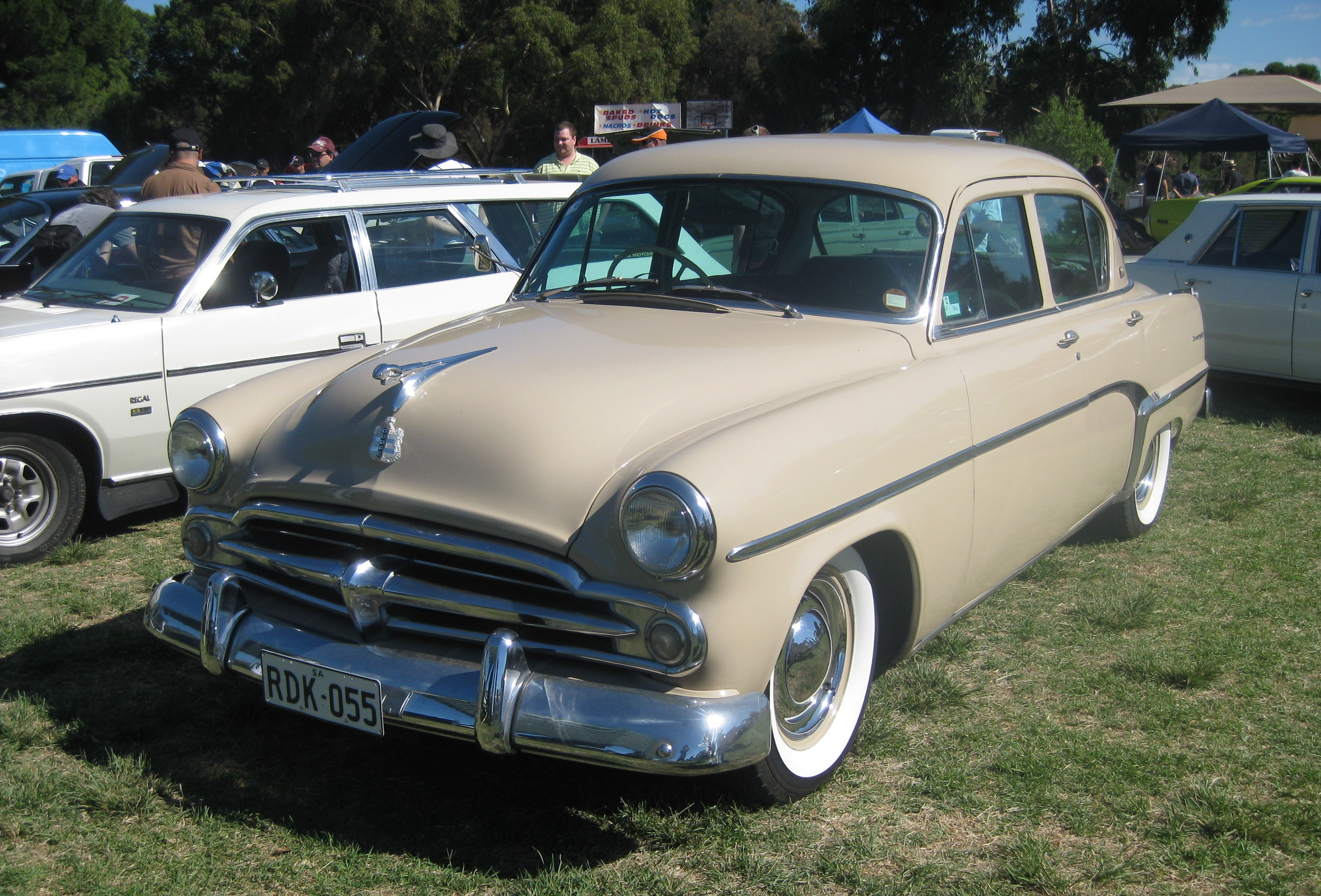
1955 Dodge Kingsway Coronet (D49)

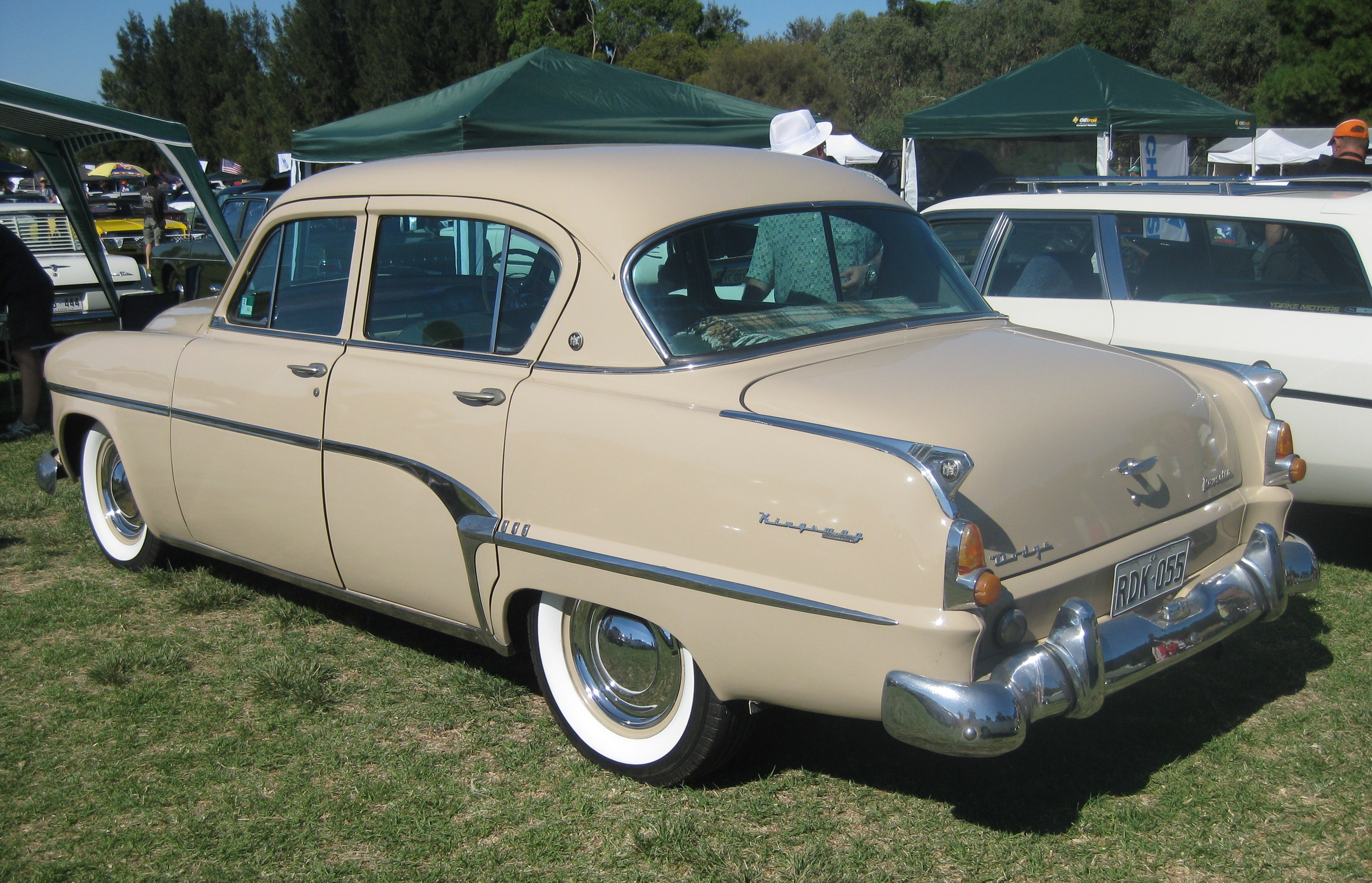
1955 Dodge Kingsway Coronet (D49)

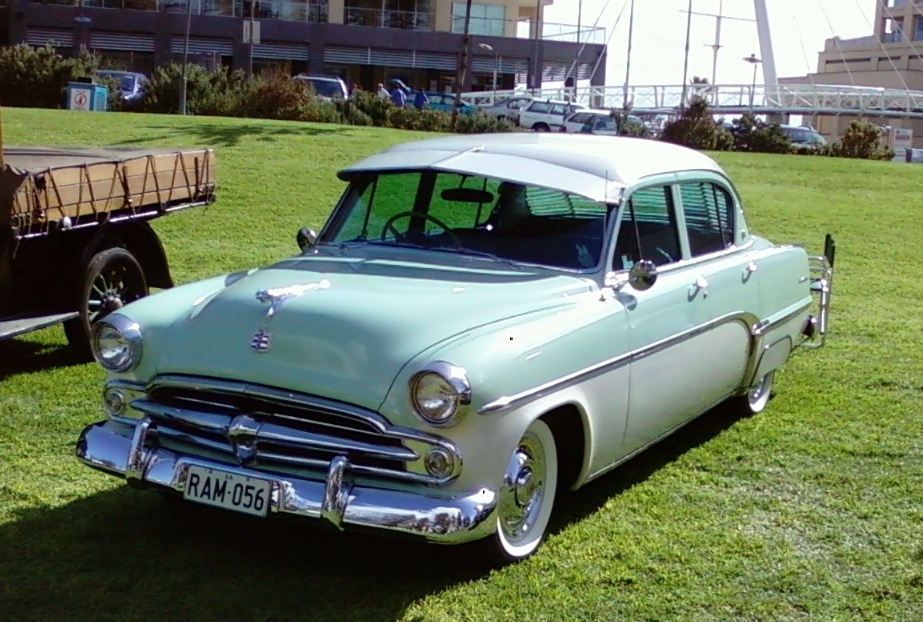
1956 Dodge Kingsway Coronet (D49)

== Swedish production ==
In Sweden, Dodge Kingsways were assembled between 1955 and 1957 at the Aktiebolaget Nyköpings Automobilfabriks (ANA) factory in Norrköping.
