= Plymouth De Luxe =

Plymouth De Luxe / Special De Luxe
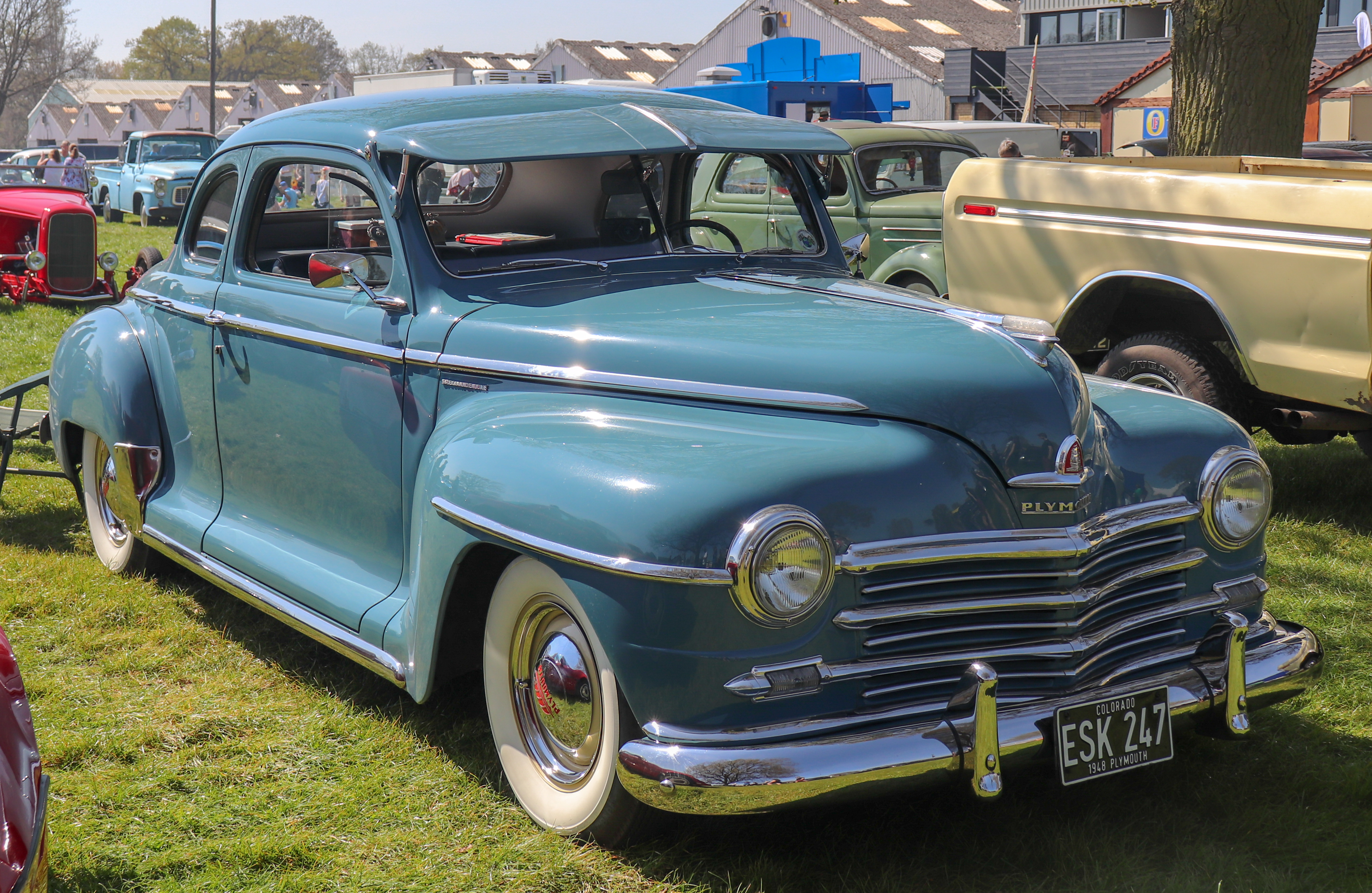
- 1948 Plymouth Special De Luxe Club Coupe

Overview
- Manufacturer: Plymouth (Chrysler)
- Also called: Dodge Kingsway (Canada)
- Production: 1933–1942; 1946–1950
- Assembly: Lynch Road Assembly, Highland Park, MI; San Leandro Assembly, San Leandro, California

Body and chassis
- Class: Full-size
- Body style: 2-door sedan 4-door sedan 2-door coupe 2-door convertible 4-door station wagon
- Layout: FR layout
- Related: DeSoto Deluxe; Dodge Deluxe

Powertrain
- Engine: Post War: 217.8 cu in (3.6 L) Plymouth I6

Dimensions
- Wheelbase: 1937-39 114 in (2,896 mm); 1940-48: 117 in (2,972 mm); 1949-50 SWB: 111 in (2,819 mm); 1949-50 LWB: 118.5 in (3,010 mm)
- Length: 1946-48 station wagon: 195.625 in (4,969 mm); 1946-48 other styles: 196.75 in (4,997 mm); 1949 SWB: 185.5 in (4,712 mm); 1949 LWB: 191.5 in (4,864 mm); 1950 SWB: 186.5 in (4,737 mm); 1950 LWB: 192.5 in (4,890 mm)
- Width: 72.71 in (1,847 mm)

Chronology
- Predecessor: Plymouth Model PJ
- Successor: Plymouth Concord (Deluxe SWB); Plymouth Cambridge (Deluxe LWB); Plymouth Cranbrook (Special Deluxe)

The Plymouth De Luxe and Special De Luxe are full-sized automobiles which were produced by American manufacturer Plymouth during the 1933–1942 and 1946–1950 model years.

The Plymouth Deluxe Model PD appeared in 1933, shortly after the Plymouth Six Model PC which was the company's first six-cylinder automobile but offered a 107 in (2,718 mm) wheelbase versus 112 for the De Luxe.

It was an upscale alternative to the Plymouth Six (1933-1934), Business Six (1935-1938) and Roadking (1938-1940). In 1941, the Roadking name was dropped for the low trim Plymouths, which were referred as P11 and not renewed in 1942, making the De Luxe, the entry level.

Between 1941 and 1950, the De Luxe was offered in two trim levels, the De Luxe and the top-of-the-line Special De Luxe. The engine in 1946 was a 95 bhp (71 kW) 217.8 cu in (3.6 L) Plymouth Straight Six. In 1949 this engine was upgraded to produce 97 bhp (72 kW).

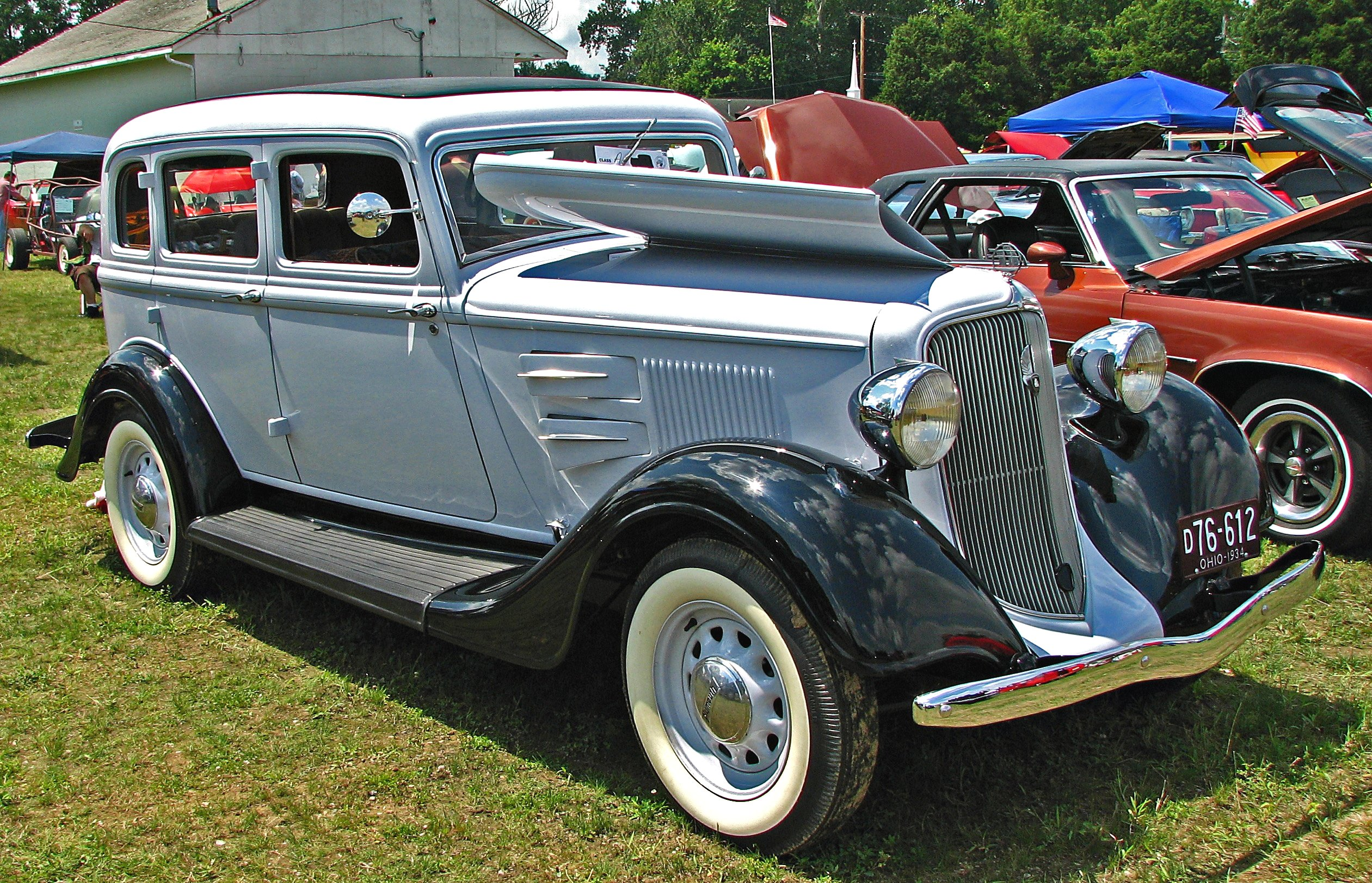
1934 Plymouth Deluxe

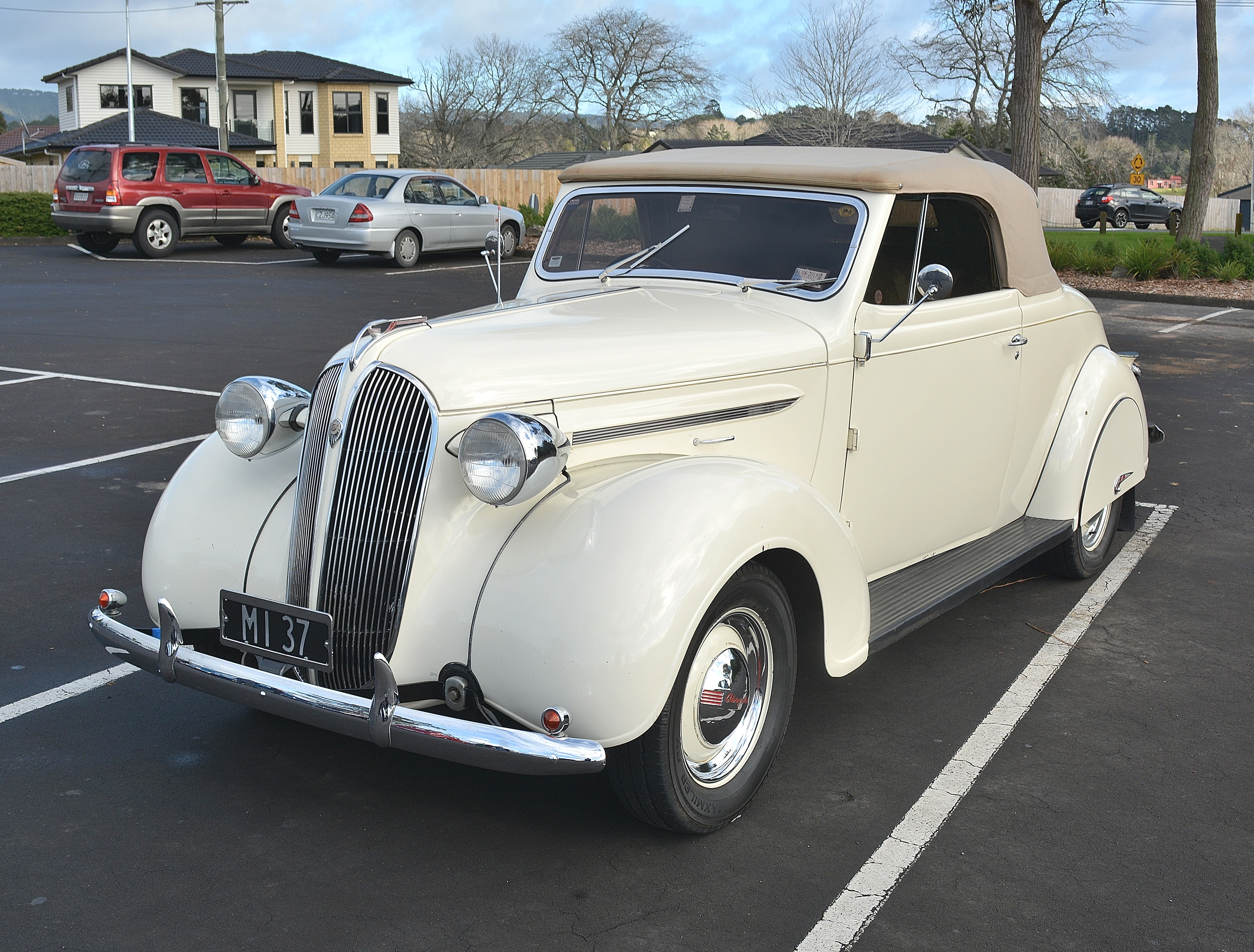
1937 P4 Deluxe

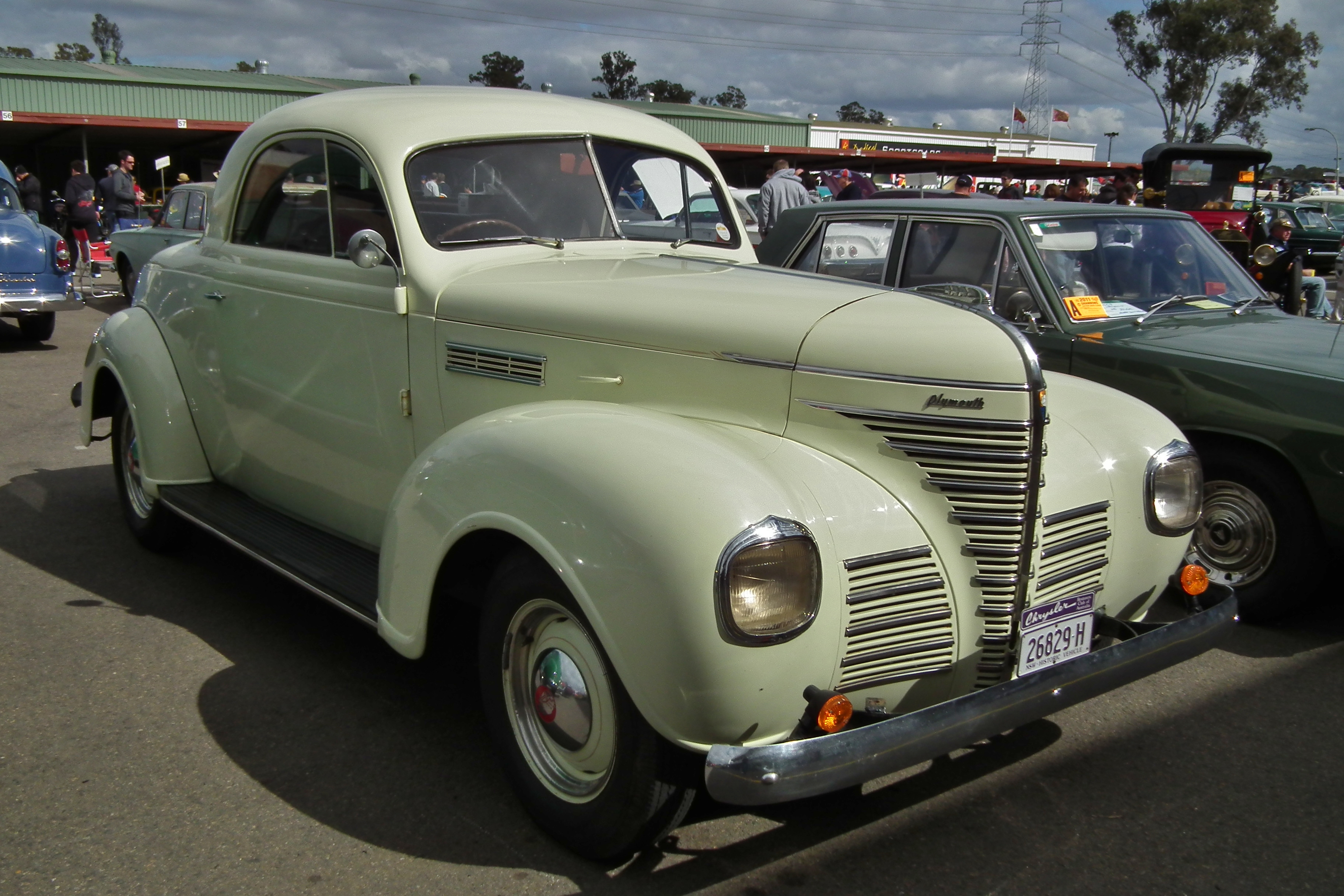
1939 3-window coupe assembled in Australia

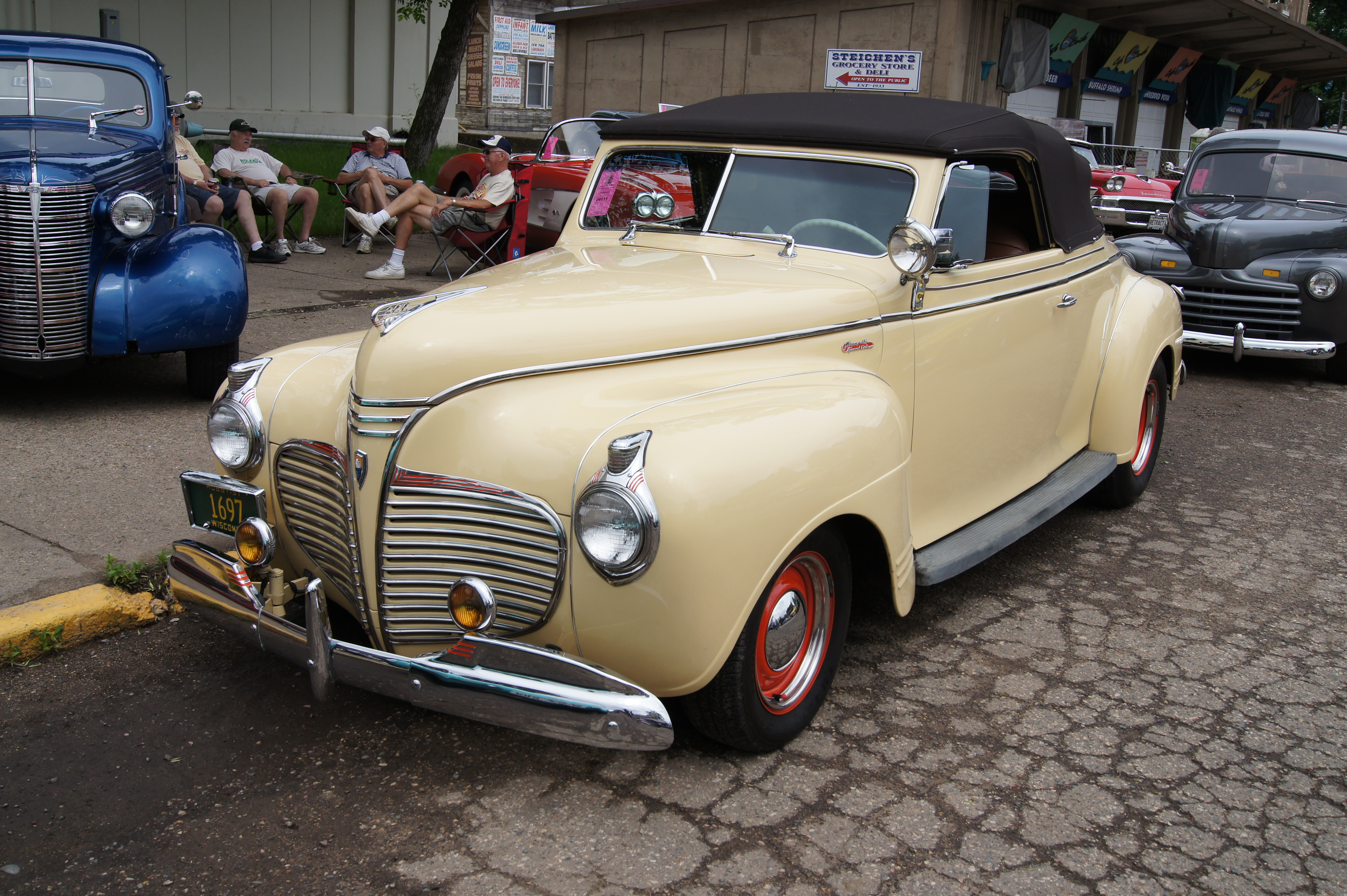
1941 Plymouth Special De Luxe Convertible

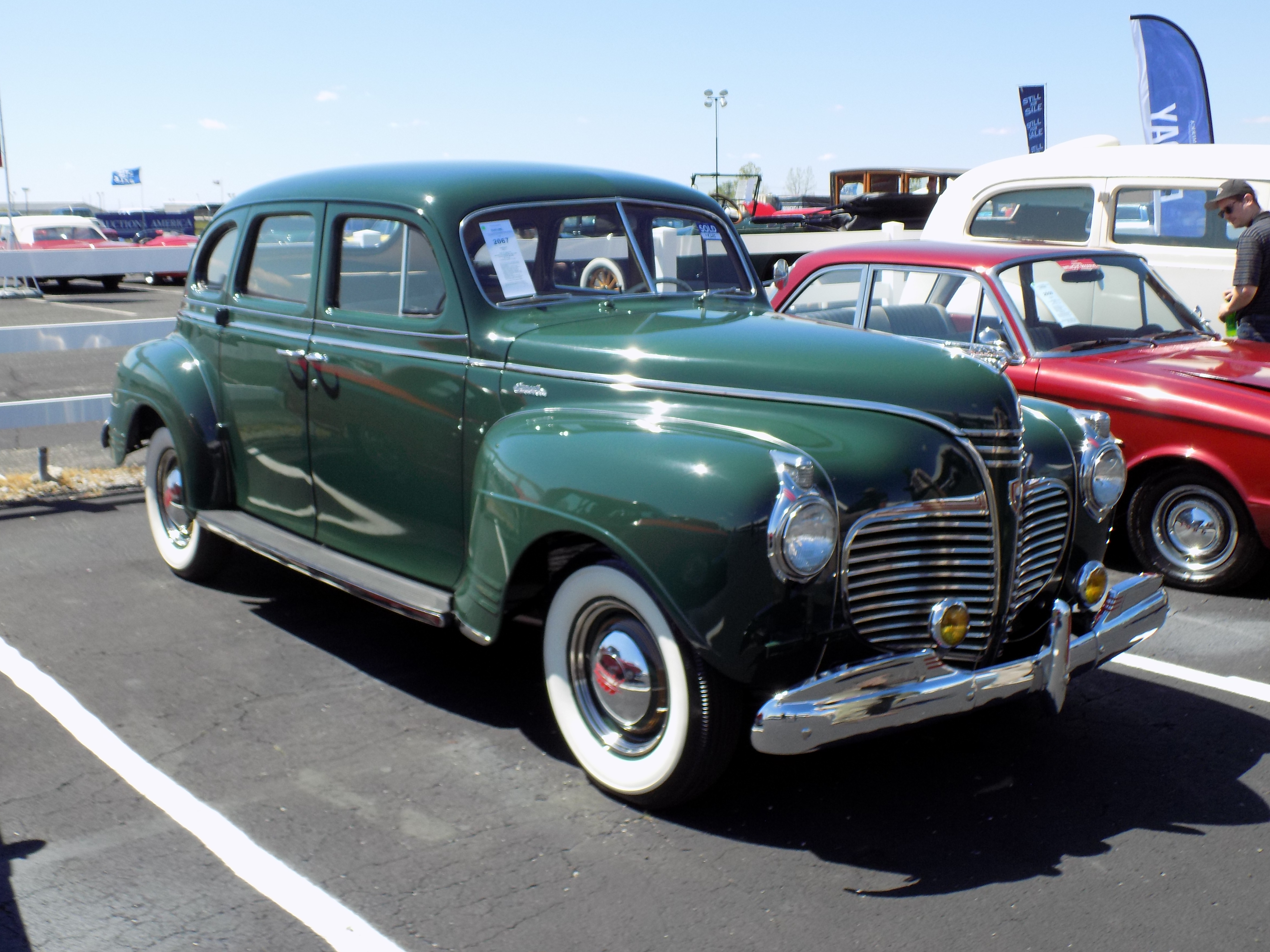
1941 Plymouth Special De Luxe 4-Door Sedan

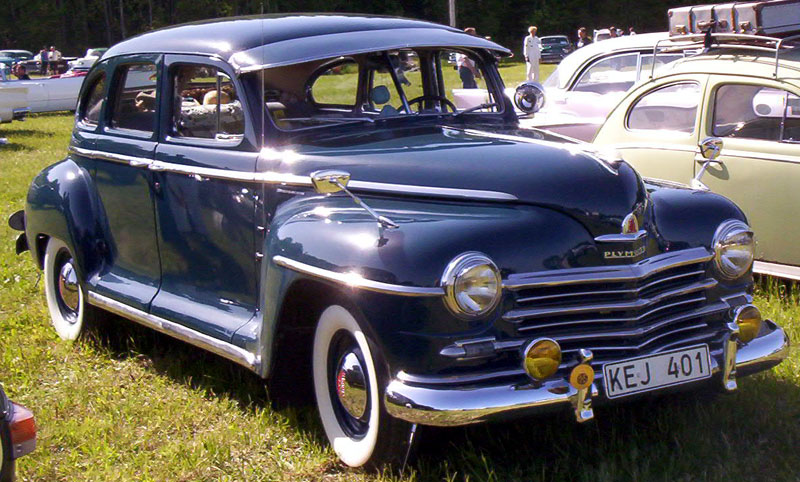
1946 Plymouth Special De Luxe 4 Door Sedan

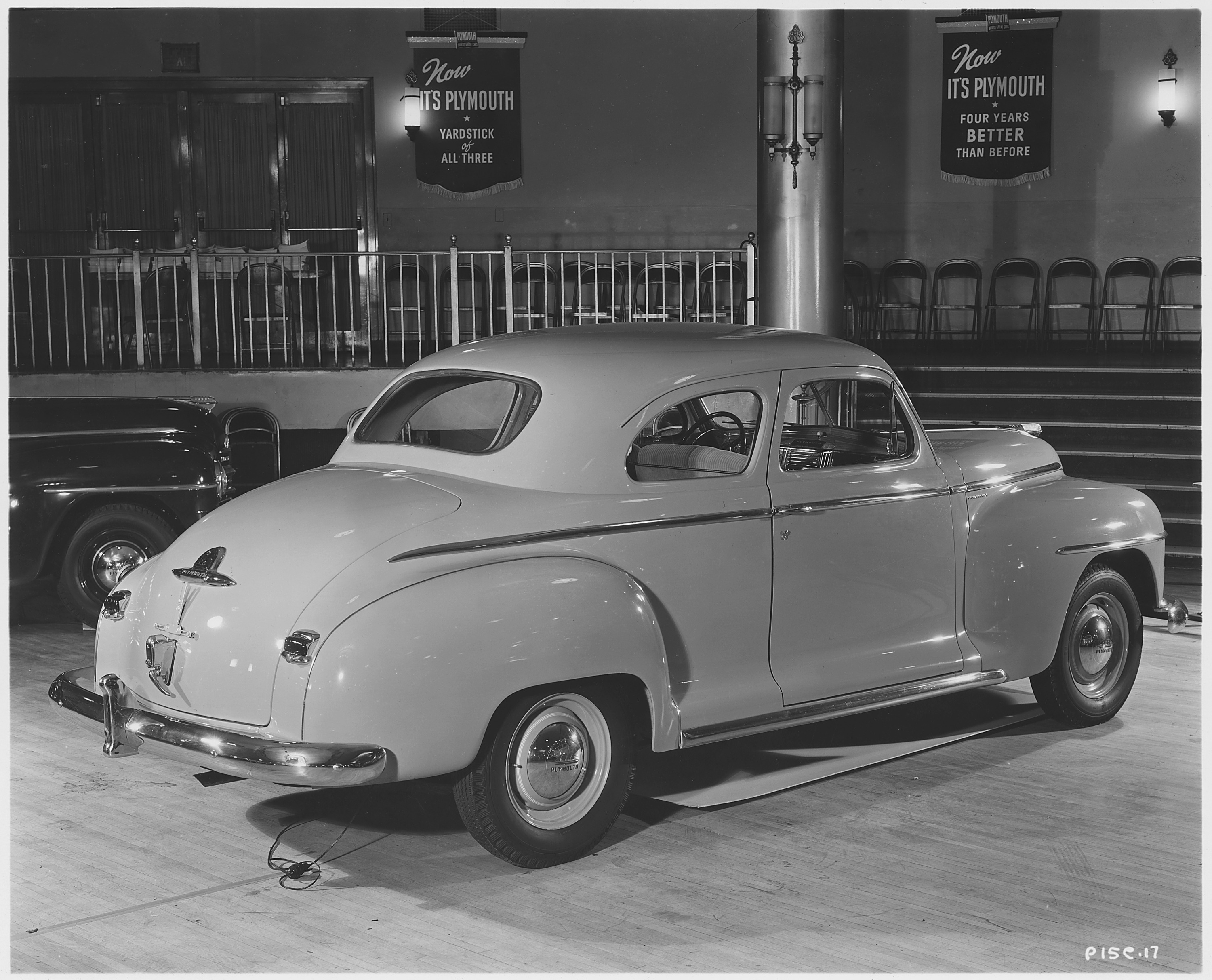
1946 Plymouth Special De Luxe Club Coupe

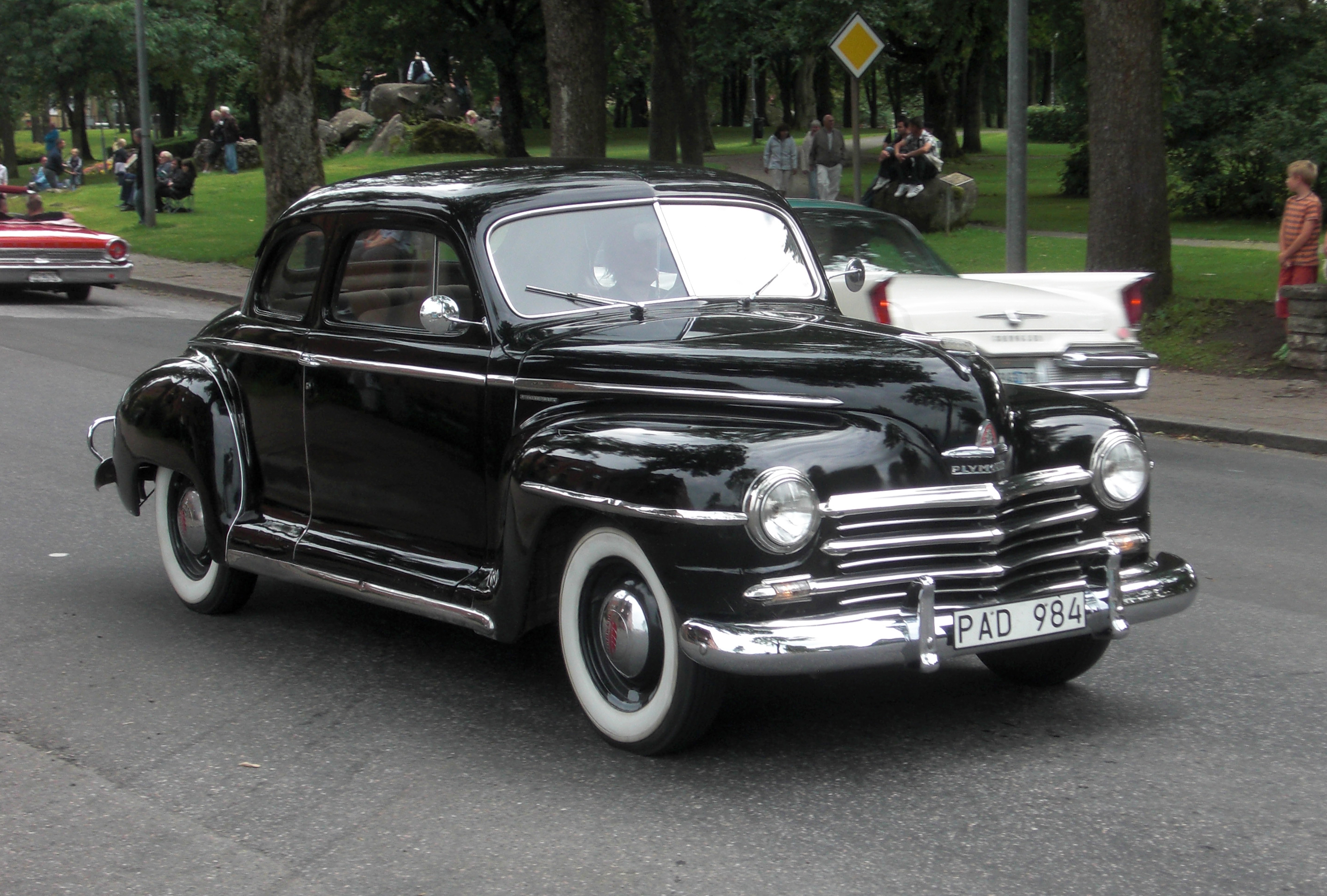
1947 Plymouth Special De Luxe Club Coupe

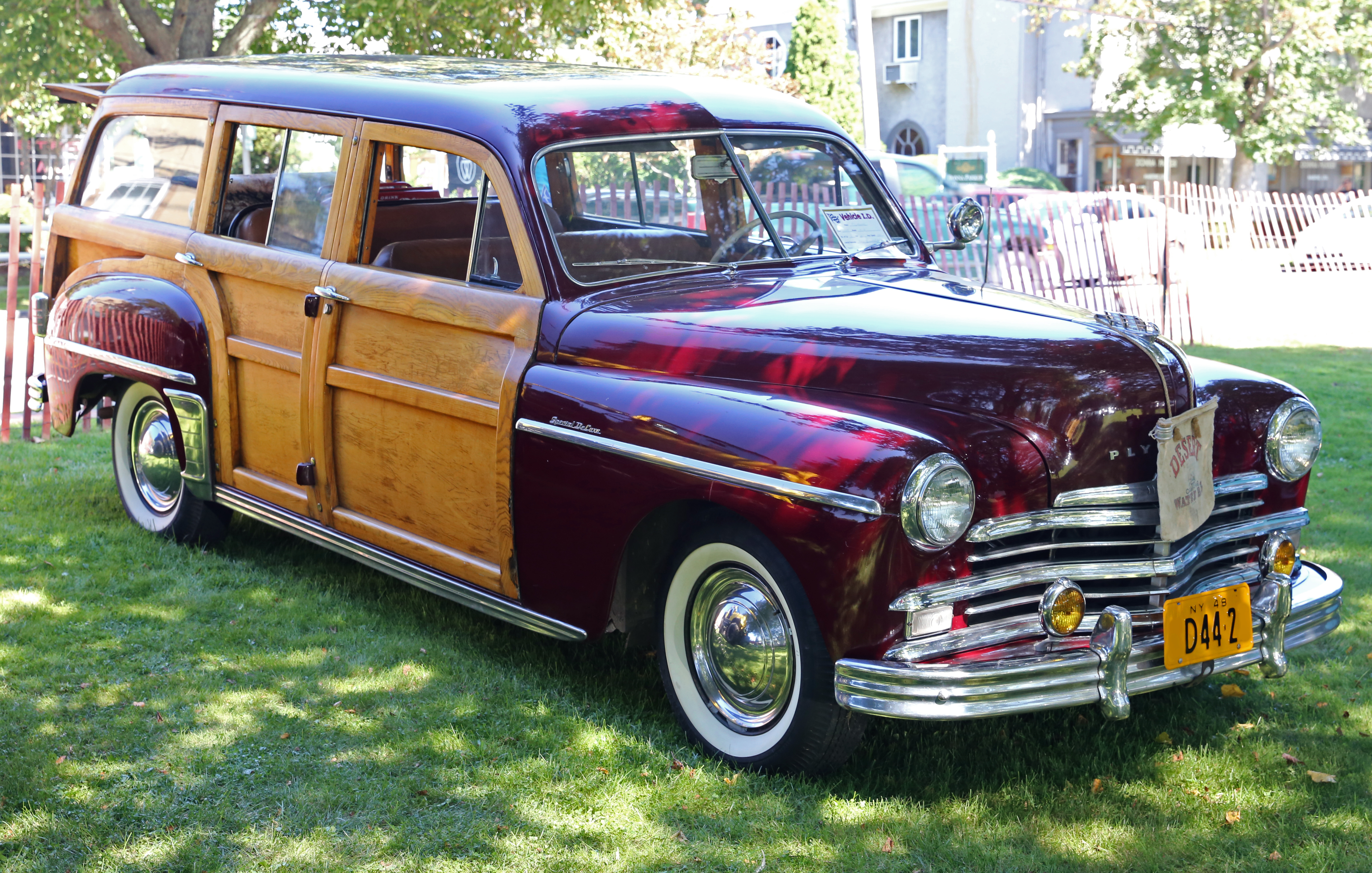
1949 Plymouth Special De Luxe Station Wagon

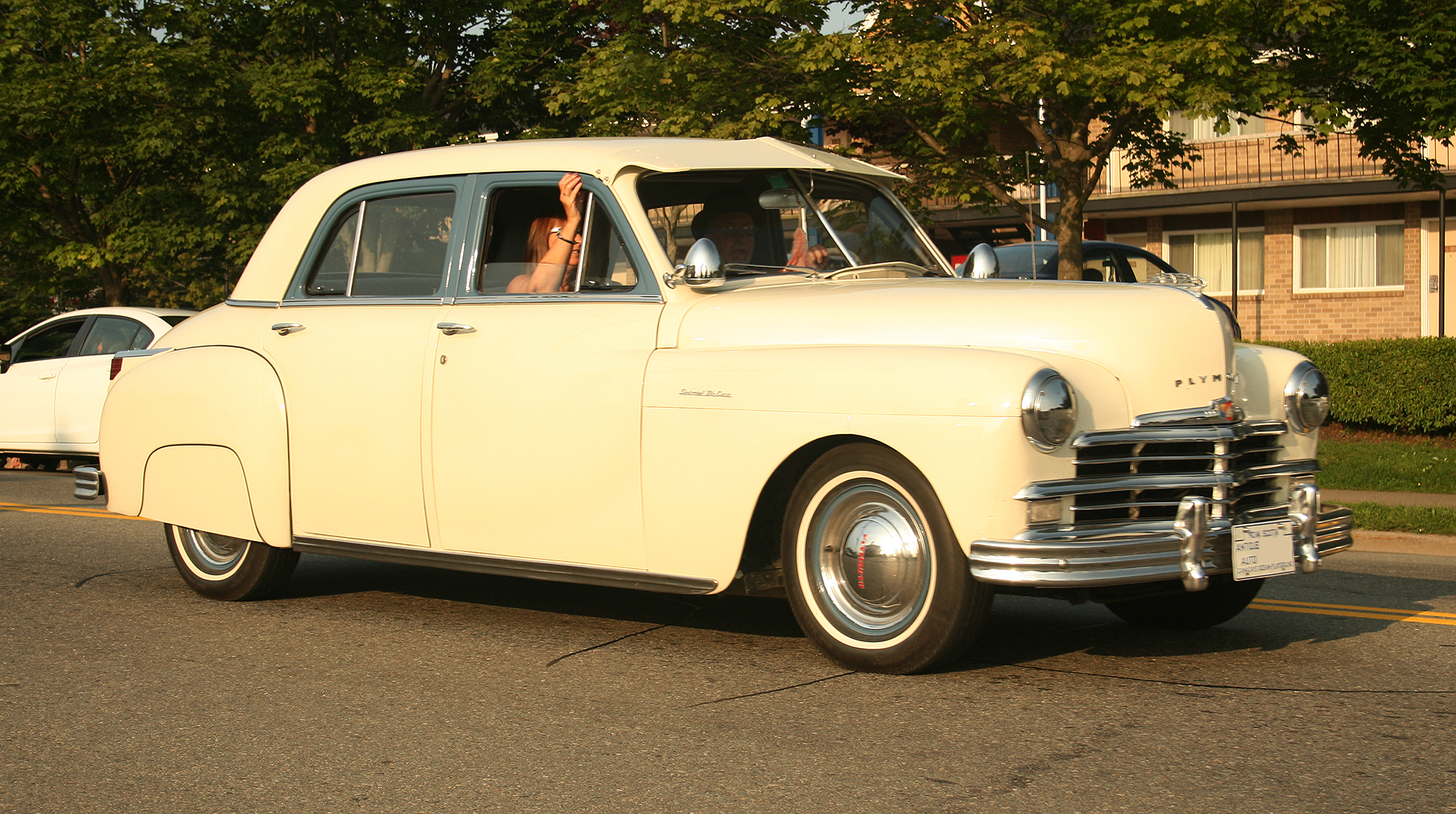
1949 Plymouth Special De Luxe Four Door Sedan

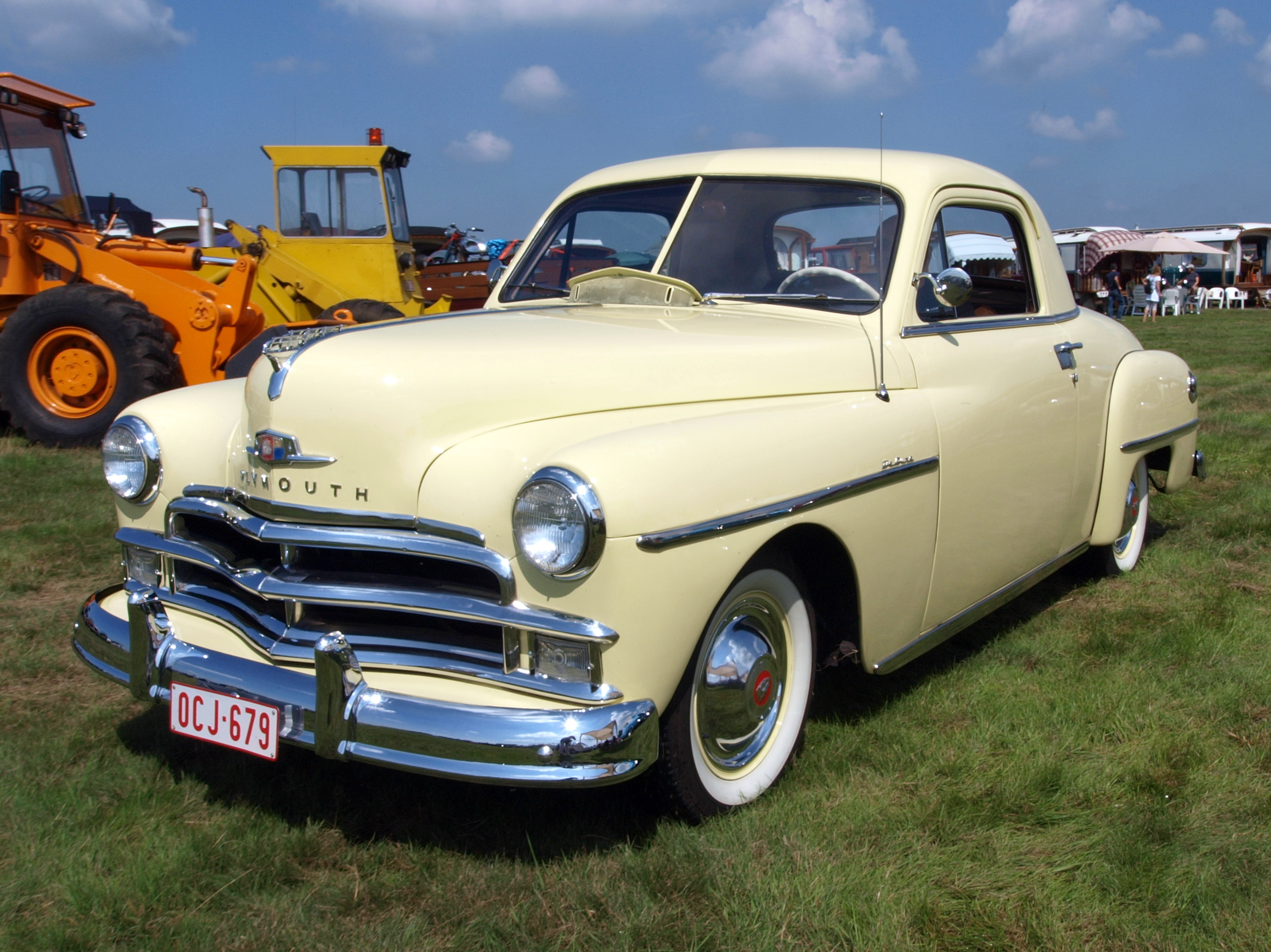
1950 Plymouth De Luxe Three Passenger Coupe

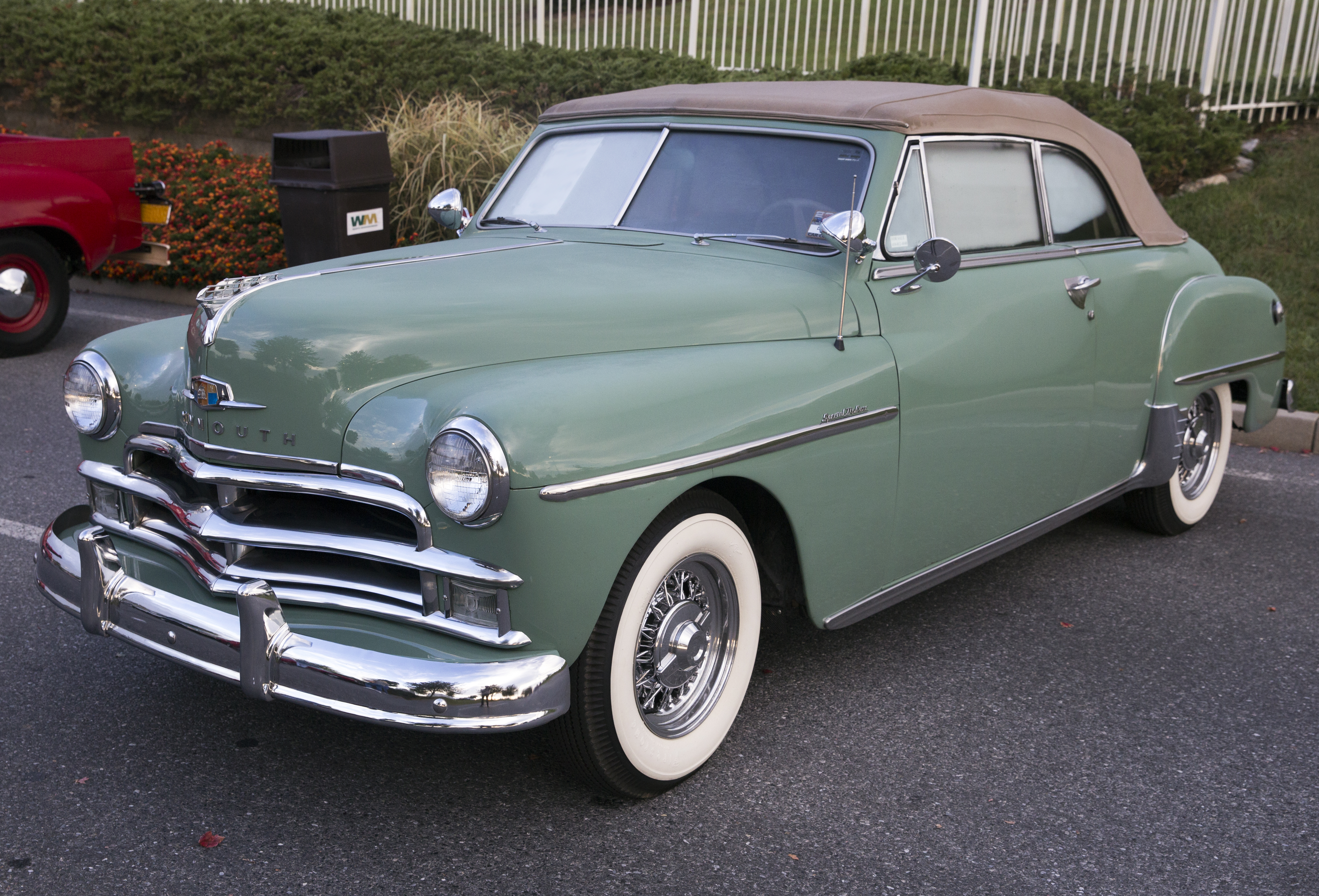
1950 Plymouth Special De Luxe Convertible
