= Dodge Series D5 =

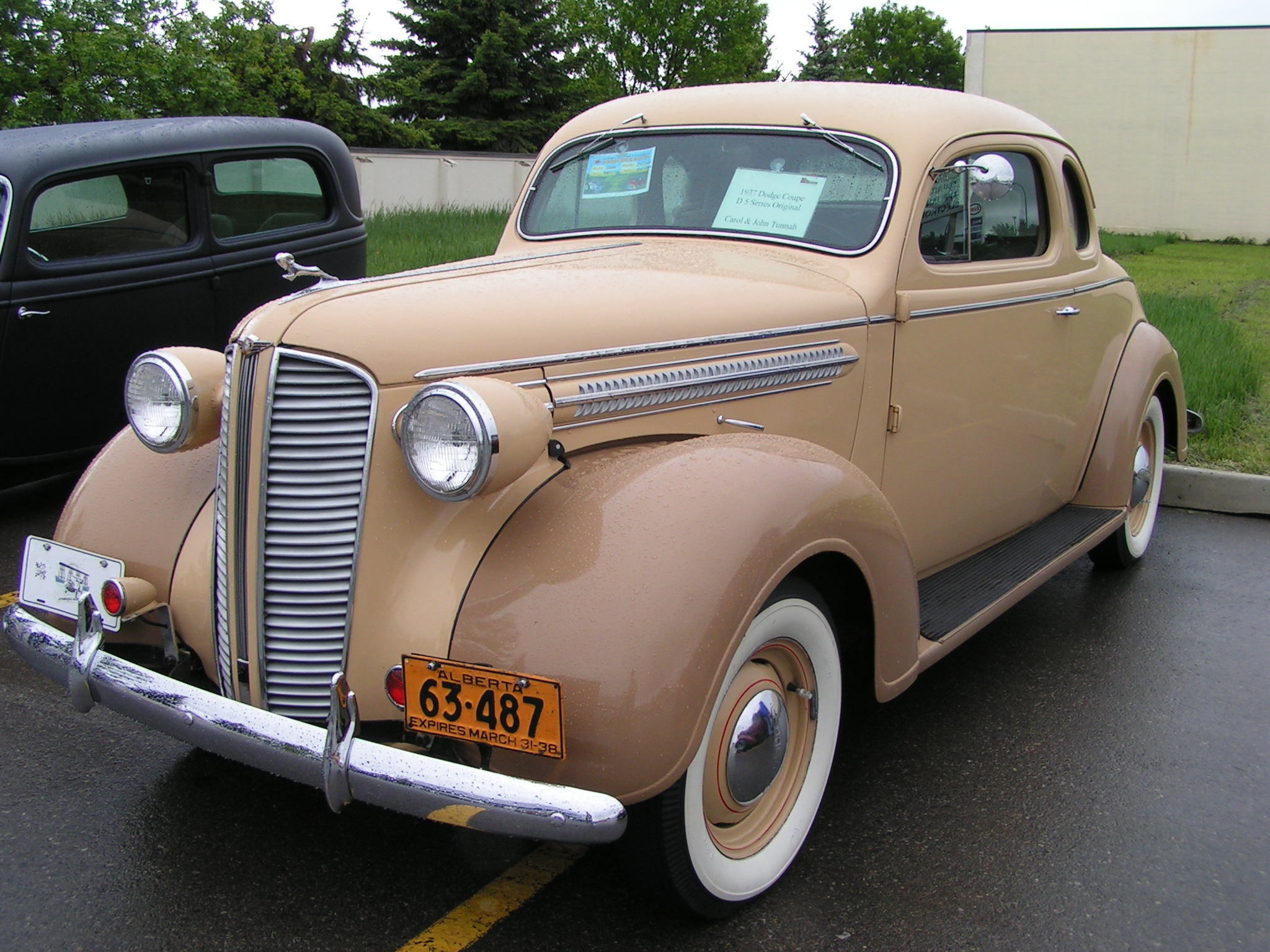
- Dodge D5 Business Coupe

Overview
- Manufacturer: Dodge (Chrysler)
- Also called: Dodge Series D6/D7 (export models)
- Model years: 1937
- Assembly: Hamtramck Assembly, Hamtramck, Michigan; Evansville Assembly, Evansville, Indiana; Canada: Windsor Assembly, Windsor, Ontario

Body and chassis
- Class: Full-size
- Body style: 2-door coupe; 2/4-door sedan; 2/4-door convertible; 4-door limousine
- Layout: FR layout

Powertrain
- Engine: 170 cu in (2,793 cc) D6 sv I6; 201 cu in (3,299 cc) D6/D7 sv I6; 218 cu in (3,568 cc) D5 sv I6

Dimensions
- Wheelbase: D6/D7: 113 in (2,870 mm); D5: 115 in (2,921 mm); D5 LWB: 132 in (3,353 mm)
- Curb weight: 1,315–1,526 kg (2,899–3,364 lb)

Chronology
- Predecessor: Dodge Series D2
- Successor: Dodge Series D8

The Dodge Series D5 appeared in October 1936 for the 1937 model year, replacing the previous year's Series D2 (also known as the "Dodge Beauty Winner").

== Series D5 ==
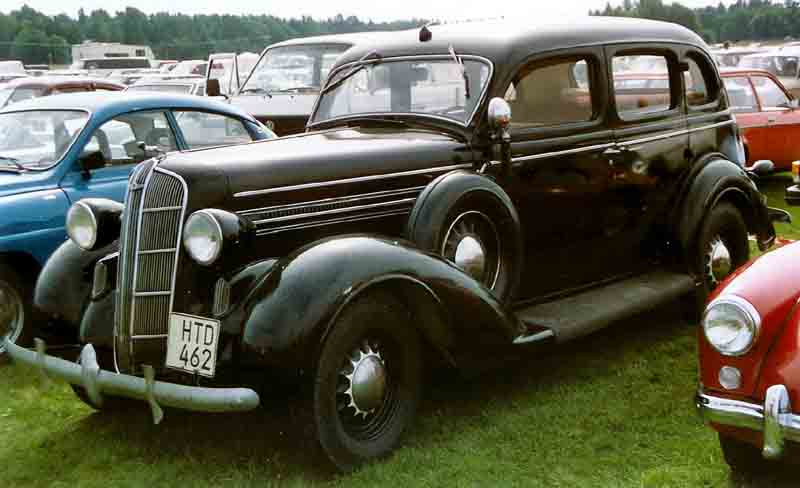
The Dodge D5 series' predecessor, the D2 series; also called the "Beauty Winner".

The D5 did not differ particularly from its predecessor, continuing to use the same 218 cu in (3.6 L) 87 hp (65 kW) flathead straight-six engine, single-disc dry-plate clutch, and three-speed manual transmission. A vacuum-operated semi-automatic system was an available option. The body was lightly facelifted, with a modified split grille, larger headlamps, and with the horns moved behind the grille rather than being mounted conspicuously on the fender aprons. A chrome strip continued the length of the car. On the inside, the dashboard had recessed knobs and flush-fitting gauges, as well as safety padding on the front seatbacks and "no-snag" interior door handles. The hypoid rear axle was also new and meant a lower transmission tunnel as well as a flat floor at the rear of the car.

Most D5's sat on the shorter 115-inch (2,921 mm) wheelbase (one inch shorter than in 1936); only the seven-seater Limousine, five-seater Pullman-Limousine, the five-seater Victoria-Convertible models, and the naked chassis used the longer 132-inch (3,353 mm) version. The standard bodyworks were two- and four-door sedans, available as "Fastbacks" or "Touring" sedans, with Touring versions receiving an enclosed luggage compartment. There were two 2-door coupes, the two-seater "Business Coupe" and the "Rumble-Seat Coupe," which had two inside seats and two more in the rumble seat. Convertible versions included the 2-door "Convertible Coupe" and the 4-door "Convertible Sedan."

In October 1937, the D5 was replaced by the Series D8, while the Junior line models (for export and the Canadian market) were badged D9 and D10 for 1938. 295,047 Dodge D5s were built in the calendar year.

A modified copy of the D5's engine was produced under license in the Soviet Union by GAZ during the 1940s-1950s and was fitted in the manufacturer's GAZ-M20 Pobeda alongside the GAZ-51 truck.

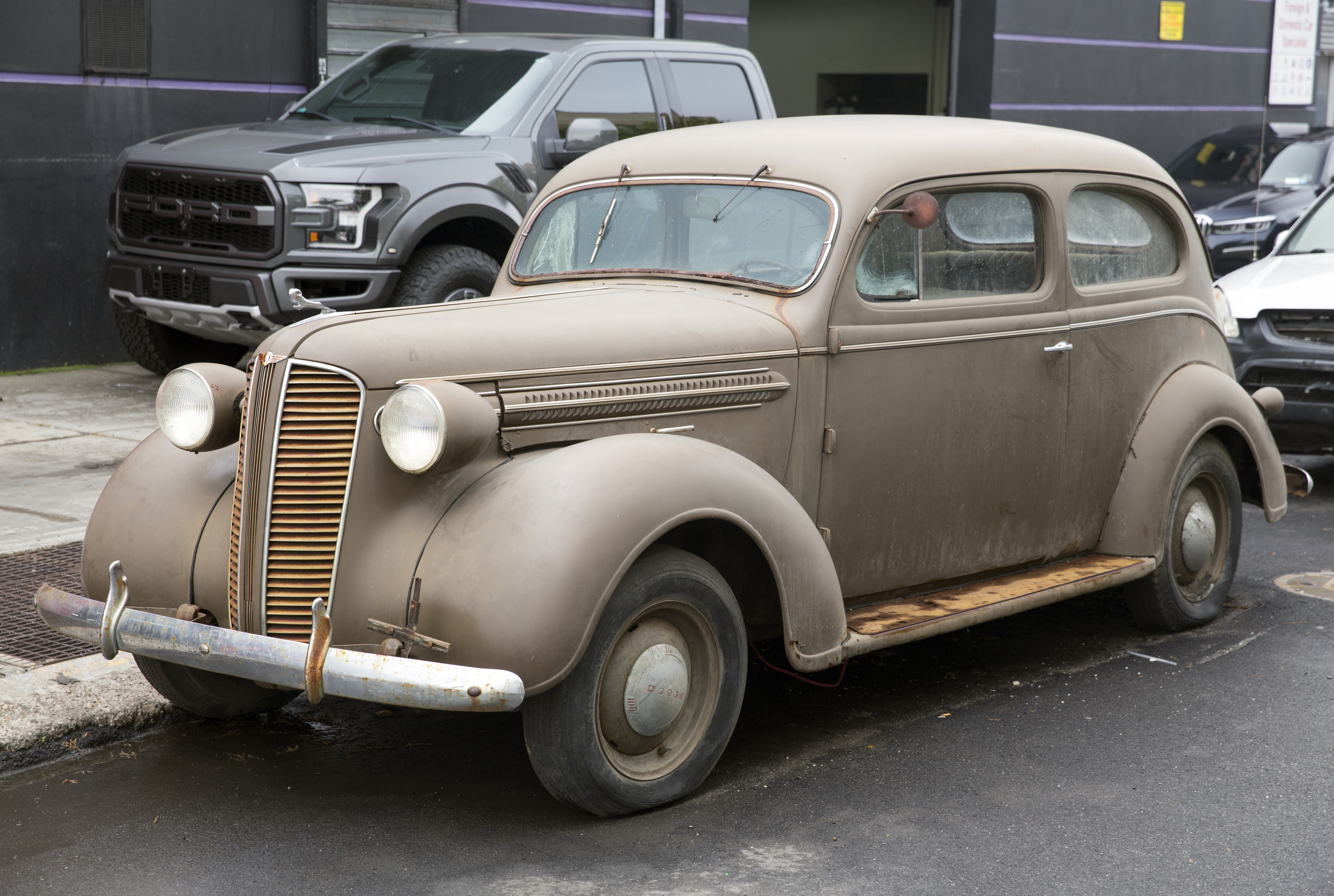
Dodge D5 2-door Touring Sedan

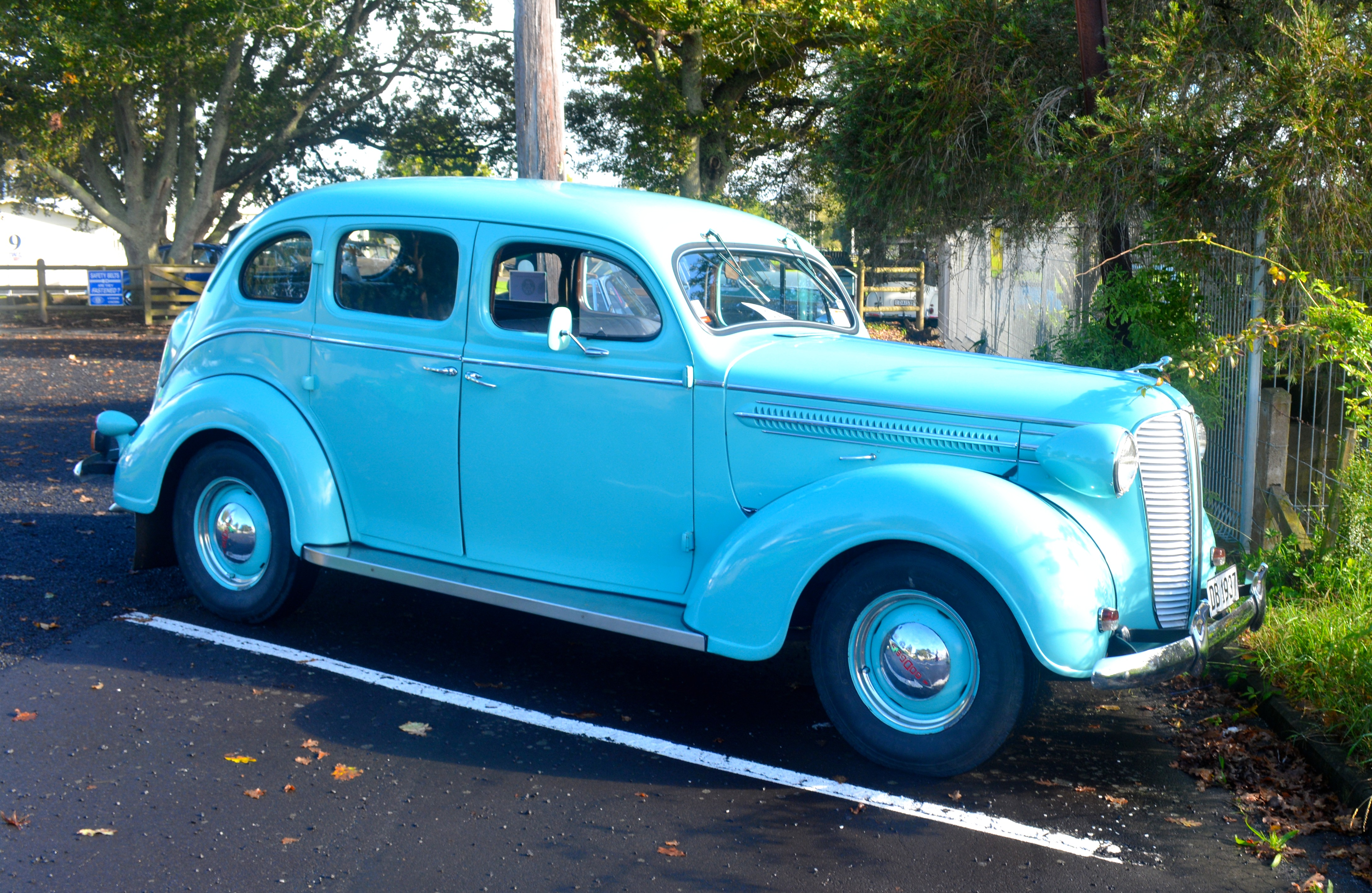
1937 Dodge D6 four-door sedan (export model)

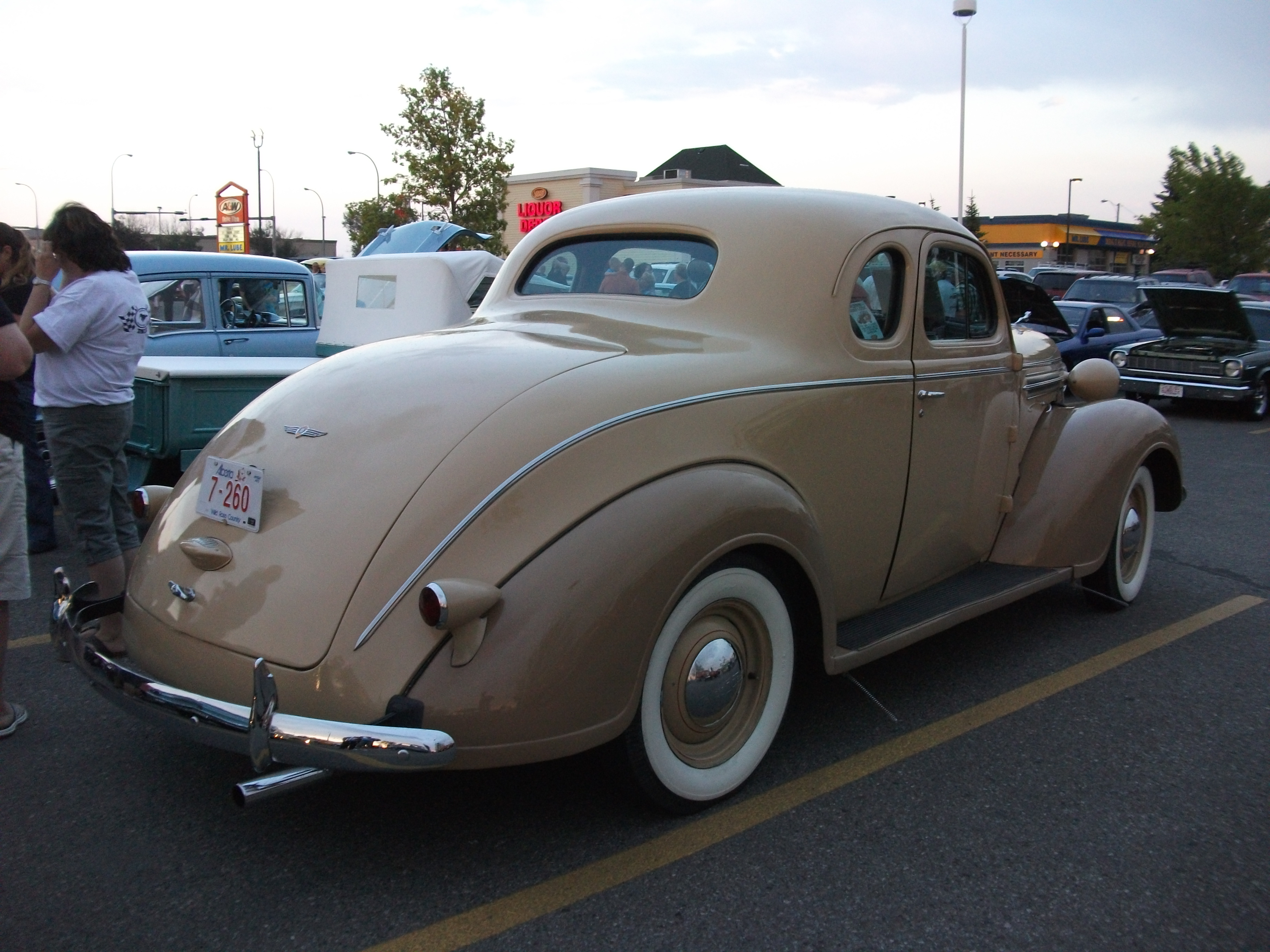
Rear view of the D5 Business Coupe

== Dodge Juniors ==
The so-called Junior line used the Plymouth's chassis, body, and engine, with the grille and other trim parts from Dodge's Senior line. The basic business version (D6) was built in Canada as well as in Detroit, while the deluxe D7 was only built in Canada. The American-made D6s were made for overseas markets and were also available in right-hand drive. Their equipment and bodystyles correspond to Plymouths's P3 and P4 models from the same year, although the 113-inch (2,870 mm) wheelbase is somewhat longer than that of the Plymouth's. Both series were available as a two-door Business Coupe, and as two- or four-door Touring Sedans. The D6 also offered trunkless versions of the sedans while the D7 was available as a Rumble-Seat Coupe.

D6s as well as the D7s received Plymouth's smaller 201 cu in (3.3 L) version of Chrysler's flathead engine, producing 82 hp (61 kW) at 3600 rpm. 39 of the D6s built in Detroit received a narrow-bore export engine displacing 170 cu in (2.8 L) to suit local tax designations, developing 19.8 RAC horsepower rather than the larger engine's 23.4 RAC hp. Just over 7,000 D6s were built in Detroit, while 10,888 D6 and D7 were built in Canada, of which over 8,000 were D7s.
