= Dodge Series D8 =

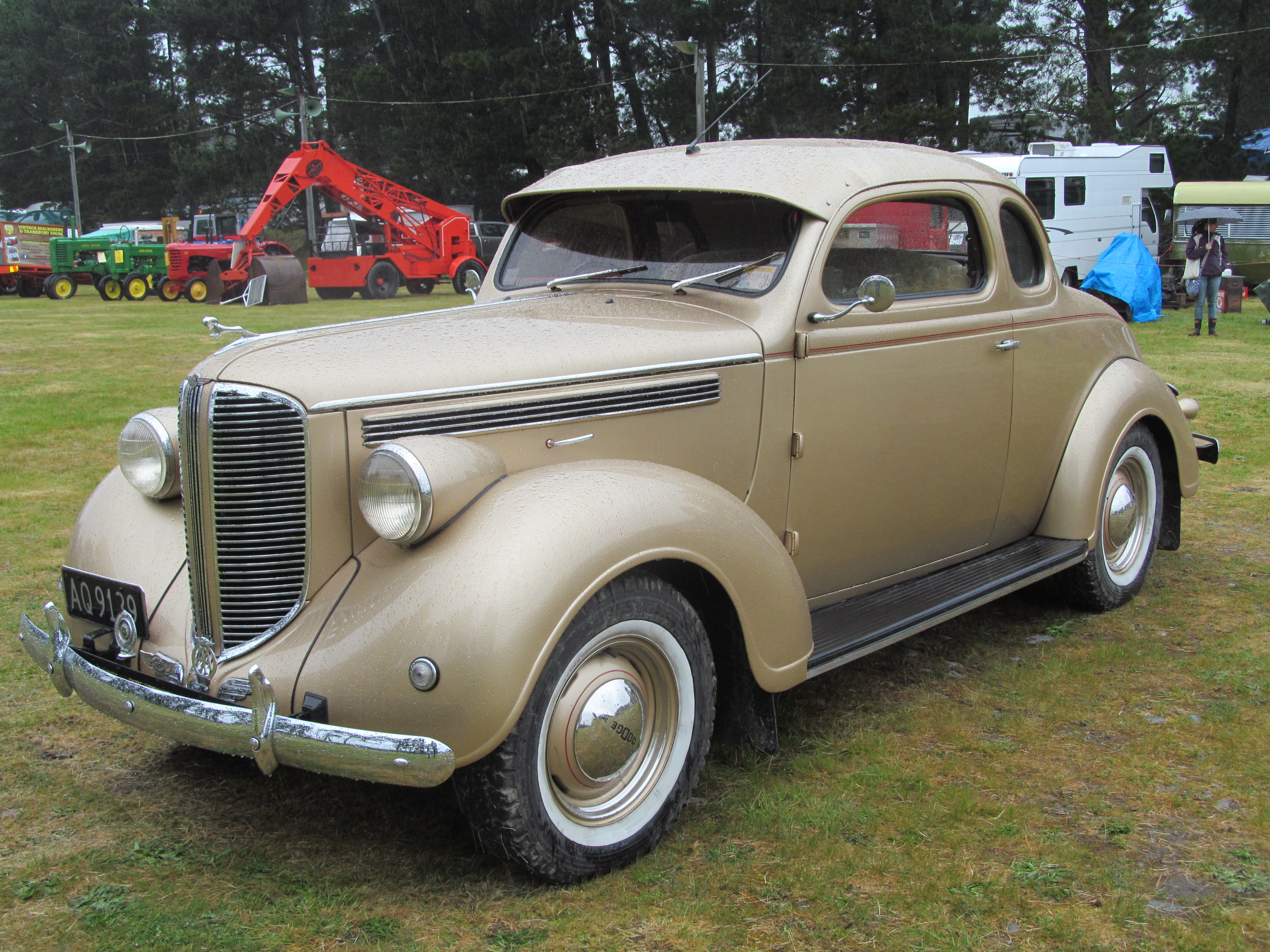
- 1938 Dodge D8 Business Coupe

Overview
- Manufacturer: Dodge (Chrysler)
- Also called: Dodge Series D9/D10 (CDN/export)
- Model years: 1938
- Assembly: Hamtramck Assembly, Hamtramck, Michigan; Evansville Assembly, Evansville, Indiana; Canada: Windsor Assembly, Windsor, Ontario

Body and chassis
- Class: Full-size
- Body style: 2-door coupe; 2/4-door sedan; 2/4-door convertible; 4-door limousine; 4-door Suburban
- Layout: FR layout
- Related: DeSoto Six

Powertrain
- Engine: 170 cu in (2,793 cc) D9 sv I6; 201 cu in (3,299 cc) D9/D10 sv I6; 218 cu in (3,568 cc) D8 sv I6

Dimensions
- Wheelbase: D9/D10: 112 in (2,845 mm); D8: 115 in (2,921 mm); D8 LWB: 132 in (3,353 mm)
- Curb weight: 1,315–1,526 kg (2,899–3,364 lb)

Chronology
- Predecessor: Dodge Series D5
- Successor: Dodge Series D11

The Dodge Series D8 appeared in October 1937 for the 1938 model year, replacing the previous year's Series D5. Production of the 1938 Dodges ran from September 1937 until July 1938, which was the typical pattern for Dodge in this period. As before, there was also a "Junior" line of Plymouths using Dodge badges and trim for the Canadian and global export markets. The main version is sometimes referred to as the "Senior" Dodge to distinguish the two.

== Series D8 ==
The D8 was largely a facelifted D5 and continued to use the same 218 cu in (3.6 L) flathead straight-six engine developing 87 hp (65 kW) at 3600 rpm, single-disc dry-plate clutch, and three-speed manual transmission. A vacuum-operated semi-automatic system was an available option. The grille was shaped more like a shield and had slimmer chrome strips down the center, the headlamps were moved from being mounted on the sides of the grille onto the fender aprons, while the hood louvers were of a new, less busy design. The Dodge Bros. emblem with its six-sided star made its last appearance on a Dodge car, along with a leaping ram hood ornament. While it was not immediately clear from the outside, the body was now all-steel with much better insulation than before. The front seatbacks were adjustable.

Most D8's sat on the shorter 115-inch (2,921 mm) wheelbase; only the seven-seater Touring Sedan, the five-seater Limousine with a division window, and the naked chassis used the longer 132-inch (3,353 mm) version. The Limousine with a division window received leather upholstery in the front compartment, velvet mohair in the rear. The standard bodyworks were two- and four-door sedans, available as "Fastbacks" or "Touring" designs, with the Touring versions receiving an enclosed luggage compartment. There were two 2-door coupes, the two-seater "Business Coupe" and the "Rumble-Seat Coupe," which had two inside seats and two more in the rumble seat. Convertible versions included the 2-door "Convertible Coupe" and the 4-door "Convertible Sedan." New for 1938 was the semi-custom "Westchester Suburban" four-door woodie station wagon, of which 375 were built. Dodge woodies had been made before, but only by outside coachbuilders.

To meet Australian import restrictions, Chrysler shipped bare chassis with a cowl which were then fitted with locally made bodies. T.J. Richards & Sons Ltd. of Adelaide built all-steel bodies in a select few bodystyles, including a GM-inspired two-door, five-seater Coupe with a rakish rear called a "Sloper."

In October 1938, the D8 was replaced by the Series D11, while the Junior line models (for export and the Canadian market) were badged D12 and D13 for 1939. 114,529 Dodge D8s were built in the calendar year. 1938 was a recession year; Dodge sales dropped 59 percent for the calendar year which dropped them to fifth in sales, down from fourth the year before.

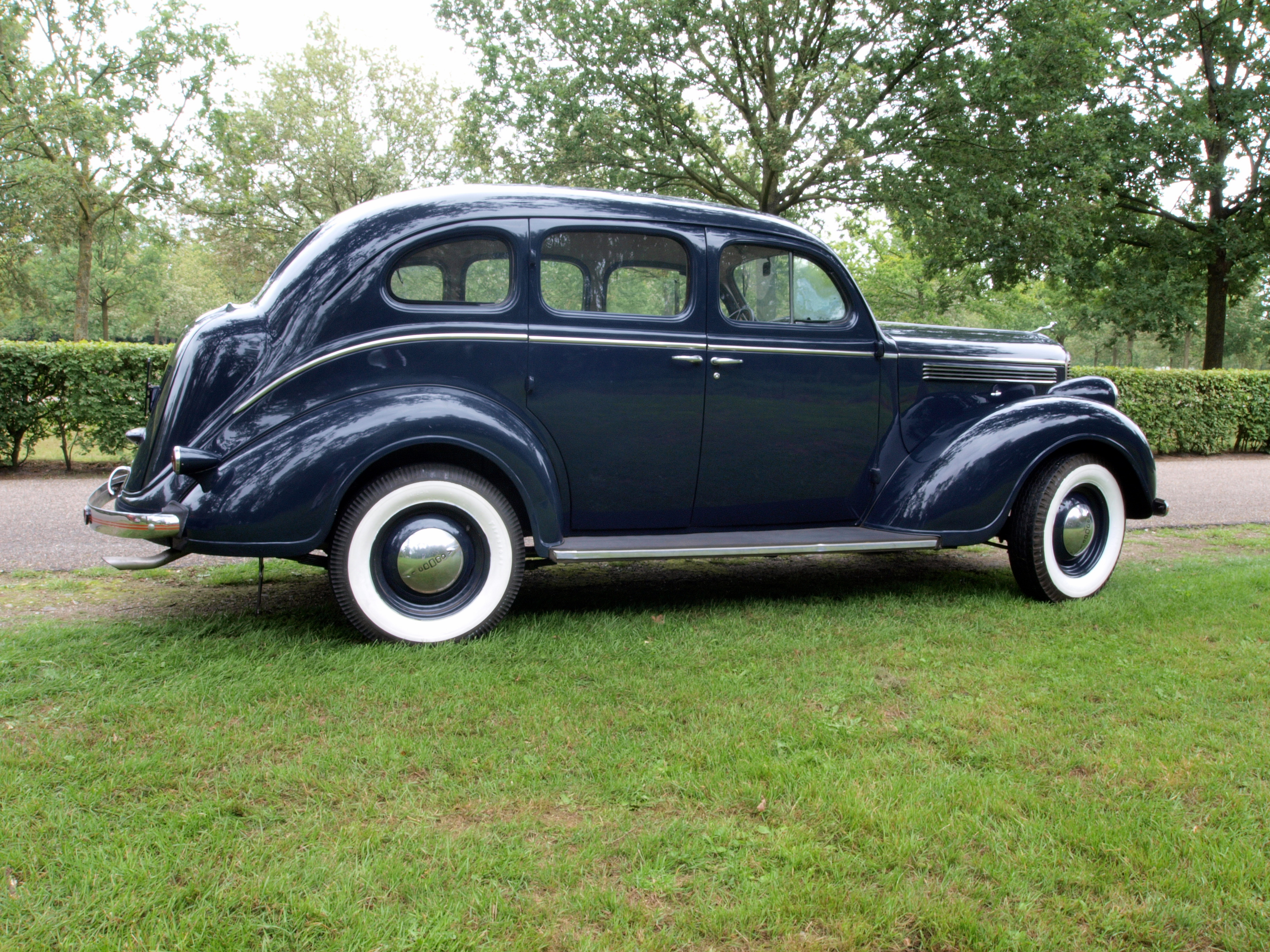
Dodge D8 4-door Touring Sedan

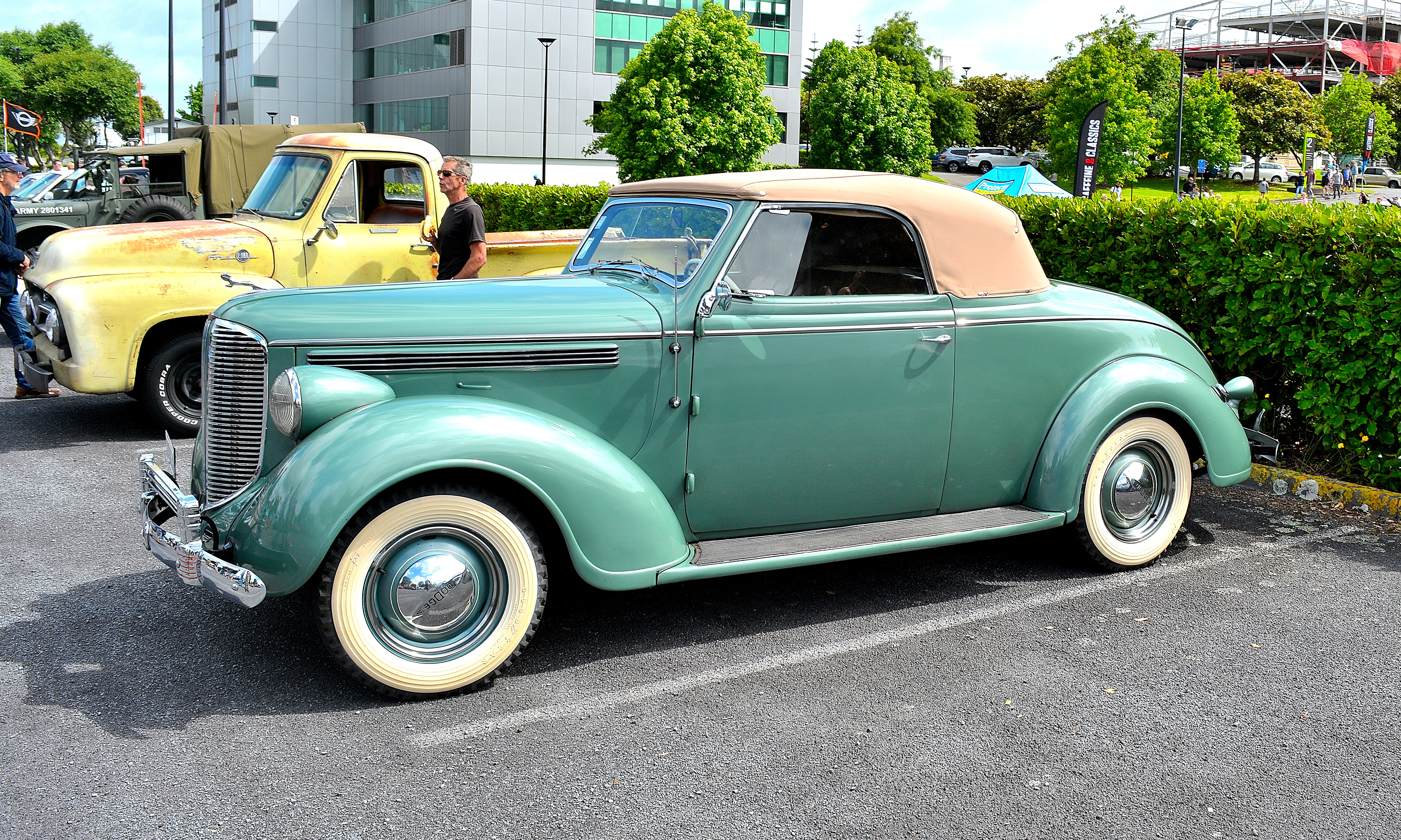
1938 Dodge Convertible Coupe

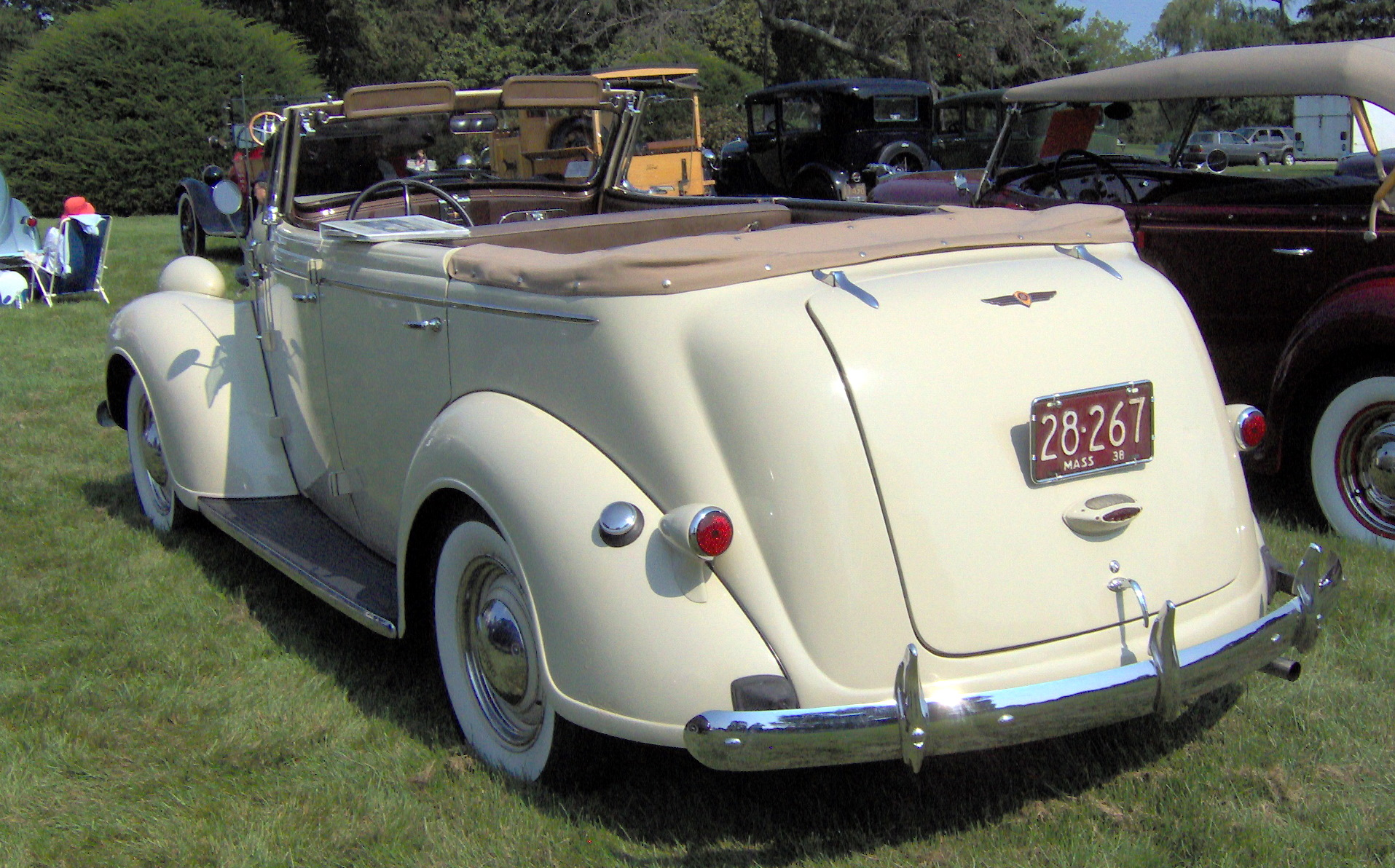
Rear view of the D8 Convertible Sedan

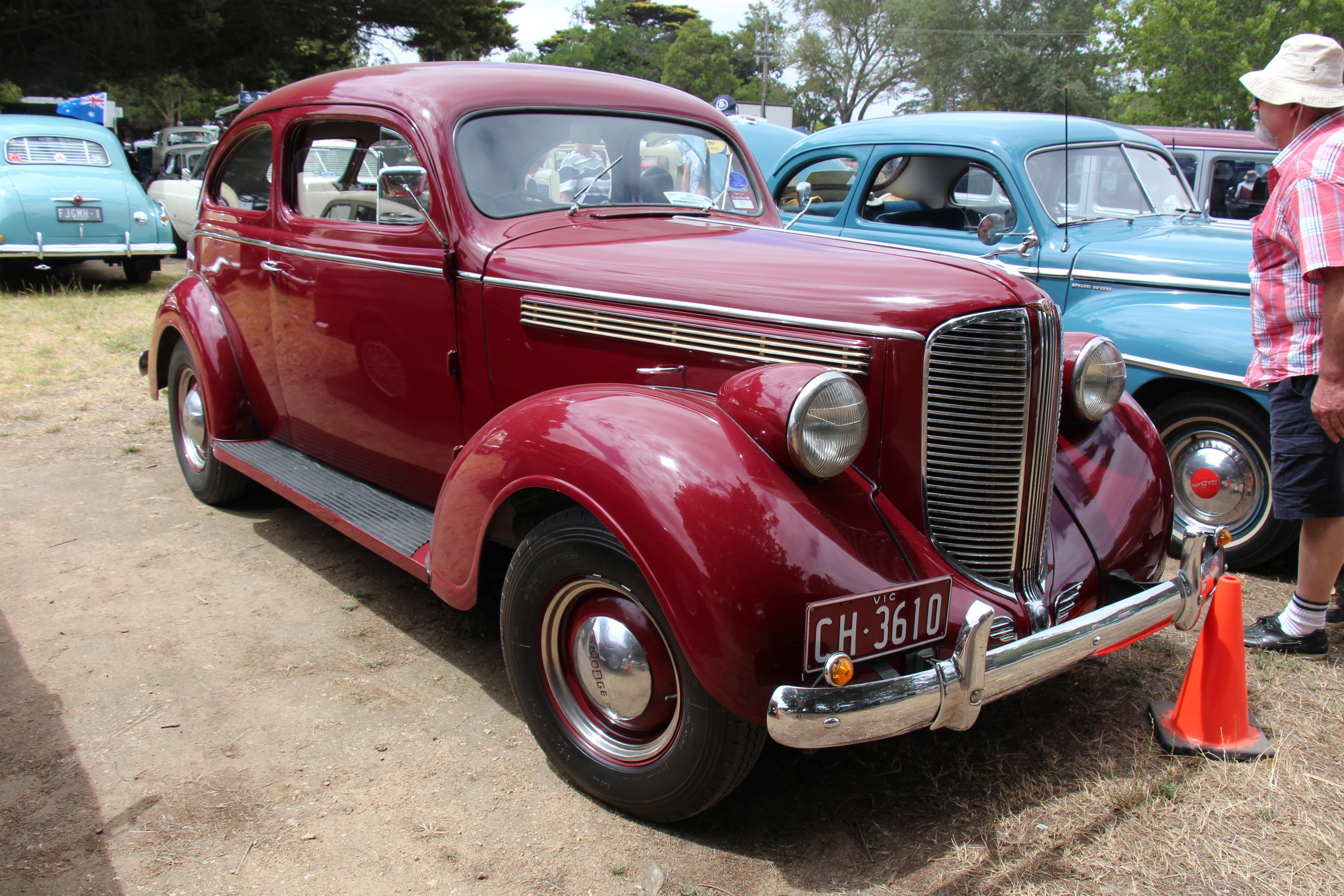
Dodge D8 "Sloper" Coupe (Australia)

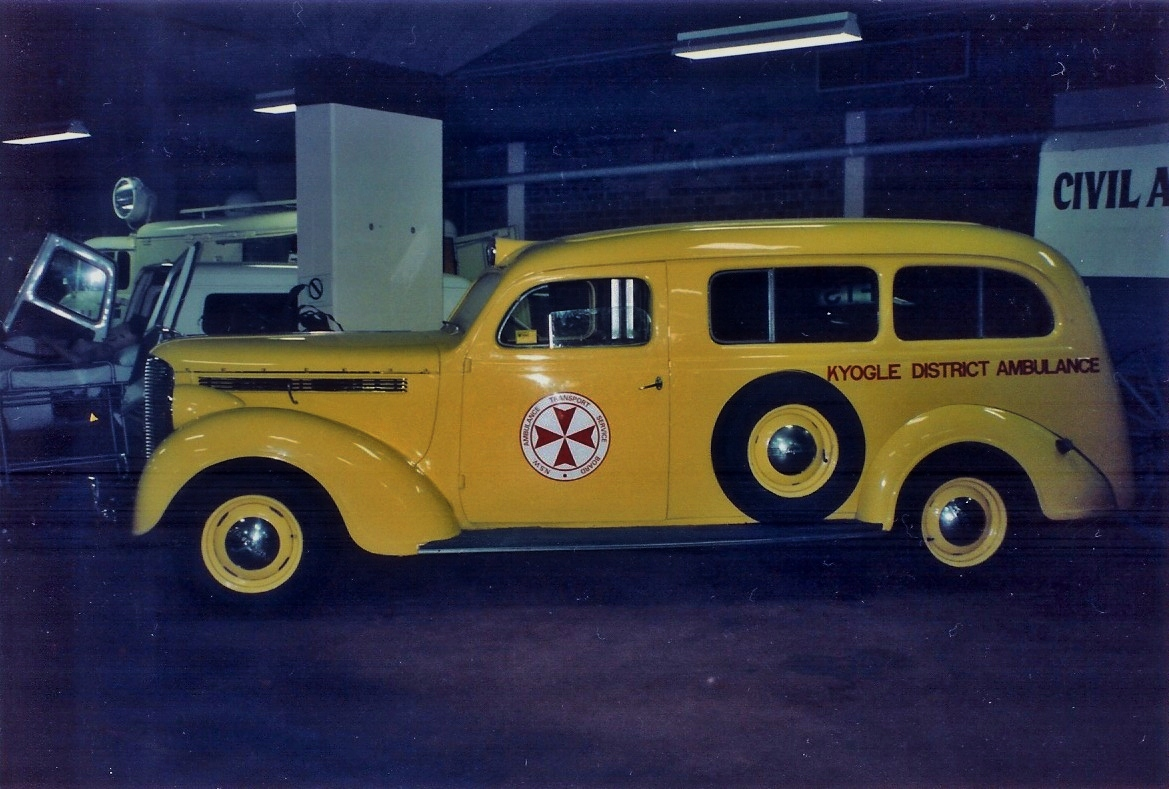
The long wheelbase chassis was used by coachbuilders for a variety of purposes, such as this ambulance

== Dodge Juniors ==
The so-called Junior line used the Plymouth's chassis, body, and engine, with the grille and other trim parts from Dodge's Senior line. The basic business version (D9) was built in Canada as well as in Detroit, while the deluxe D10 was only built in Canada. The American-made D9s were made for overseas markets only and were also available in right-hand drive. Their equipment and bodystyles correspond to Plymouths's P5 and P6 models from the same year, sitting on the same 112-inch (2,845 mm) wheelbase. Both series were available as a two-door Business Coupe, and as two- or four-door standard or Touring Sedans. The D10 was also available as a Rumble-Seat Coupe.

D9s as well as D10s received Plymouth's smaller 201 cu in (3.3 L) version of Chrysler's flathead engine, producing 82 hp (61 kW) at 3600 rpm. 81 of the Detroit-built D9s received a narrow-bore export engine displacing 170 cu in (2.8 L) to suit local tax designations, developing 19.8 RAC horsepower rather than the larger engine's 23.4 hp. During 1938, Chrysler Canada opened an engine casting plant at Windsor, just south of the main plant. To avoid having to manufacture two different kinds of engines, Canadian-made cars received a wider-bore, shorter-stroke engine (based on the larger Chrysler/De Soto unit) albeit with nearly identical displacement - 201.29 cu in (3,298.6 cc) rather than the 201.33 cu in (3,299.2 cc) of the American Plymouth/Dodge engine.

Just over 7,500 D9s were built in Detroit (with 4,285 being right-hand drive), while 10,695 D9 and D10 were built in Canada. Of the Canadian-built cars, over three quarters were of the Deluxe model.

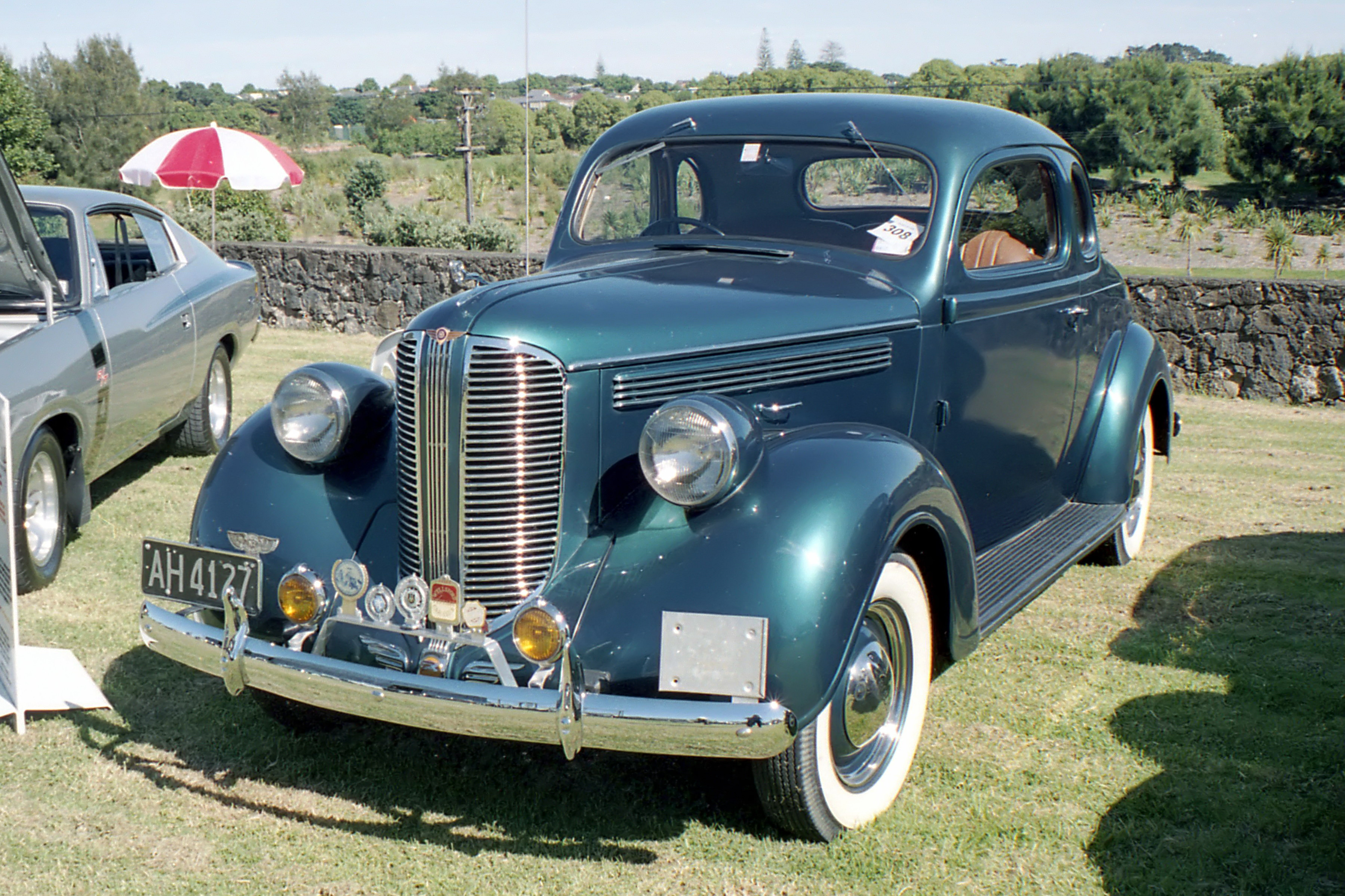
Dodge D9 Business Coupe (US-built for New Zealand)

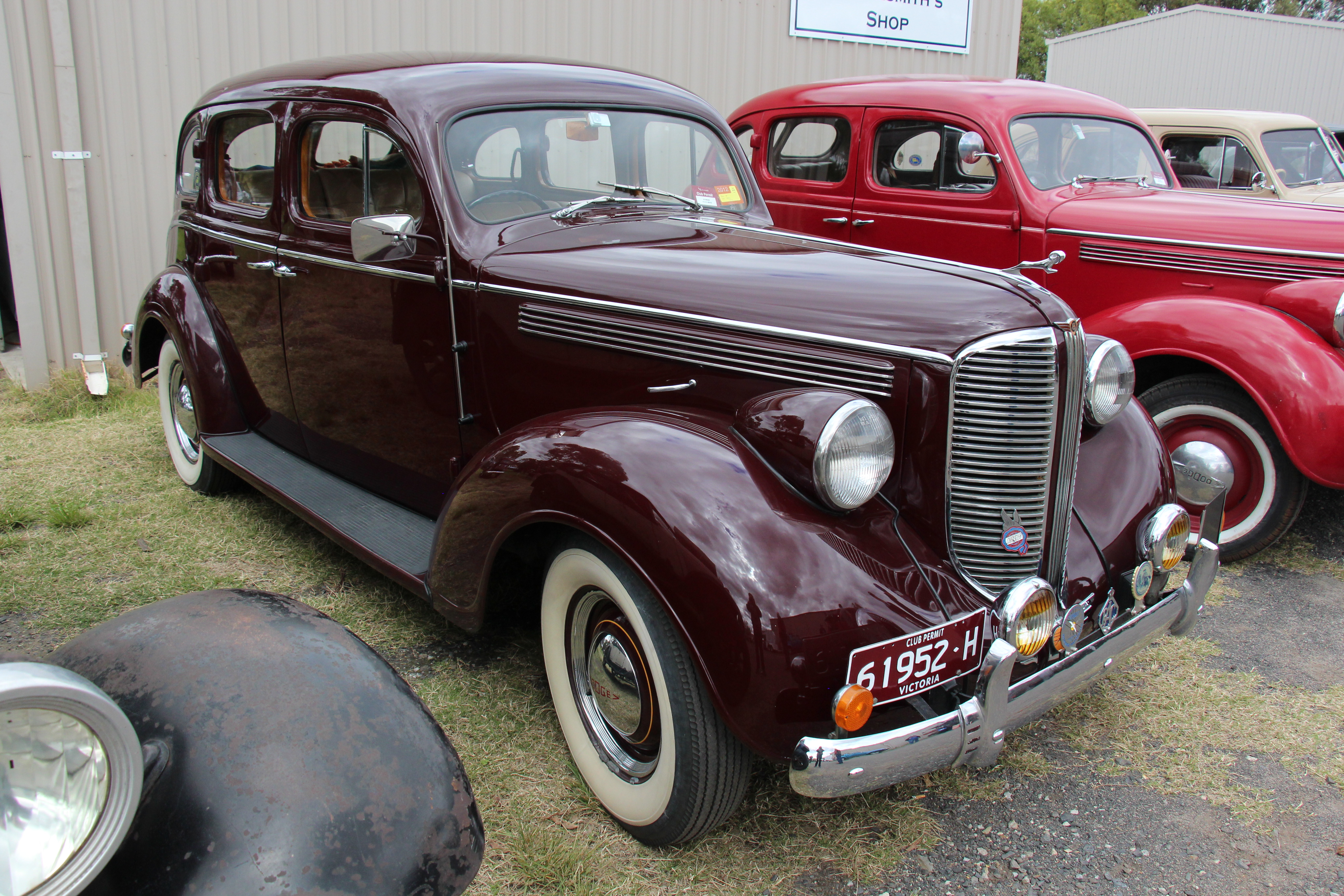
Dodge D9 four-door Sedan
