= Dodge Custom =

Dodge D24 (Deluxe and Custom)
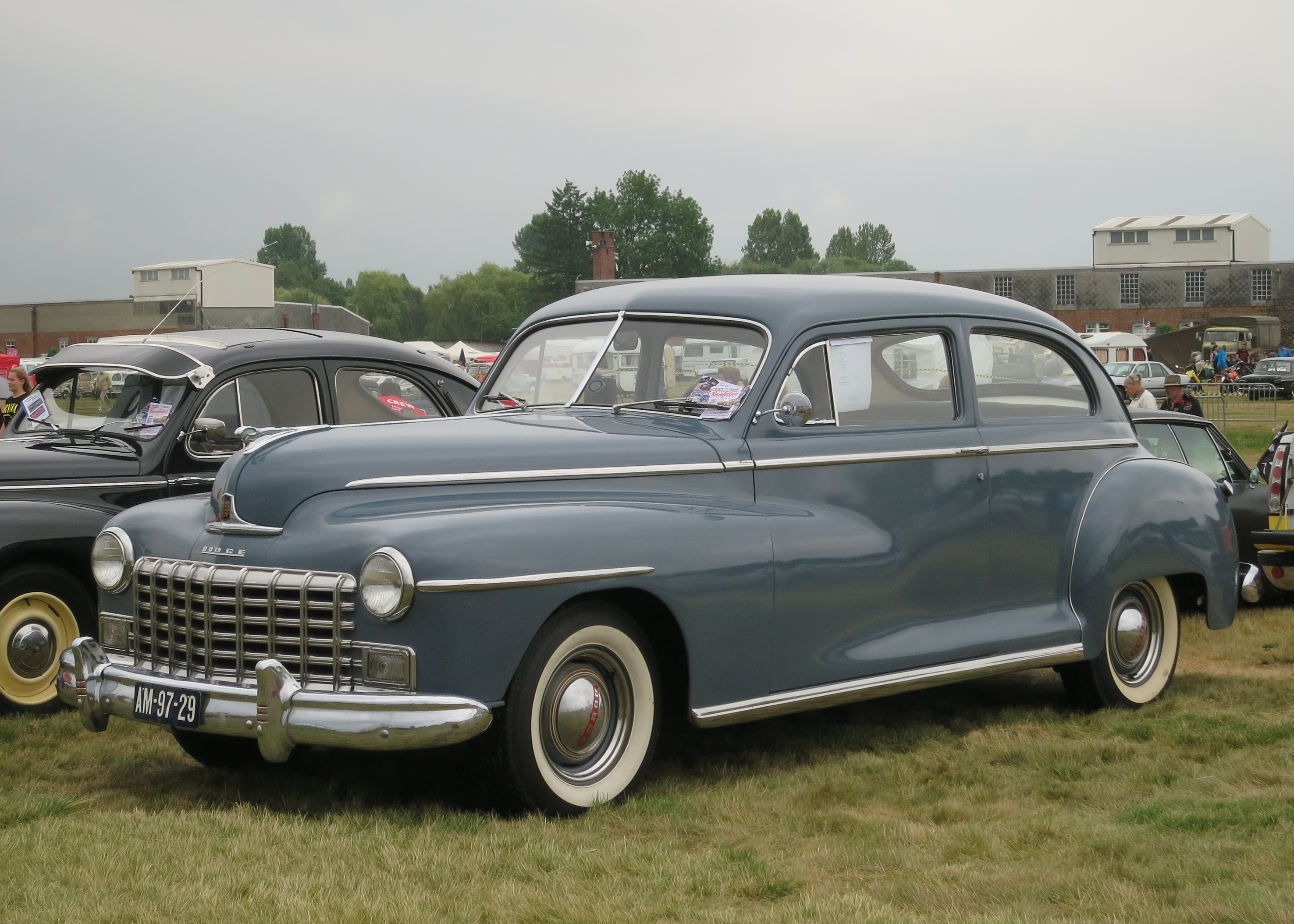
- 1949 Dodge Deluxe 2-door sedan

Overview
- Manufacturer: Dodge (Chrysler)
- Production: 1946–1949
- Assembly: United States: Hamtramck, Michigan (Dodge Main Plant); United States: Evansville, Indiana (Evansville Assembly); United States: San Leandro, California (San Leandro Assembly: 1948–1949); Canada: Windsor, Ontario (Windsor Assembly)

Body and chassis
- Class: Full-size
- Body style: 2-door coupe 4-door sedan 2-door convertible
- Layout: FR layout
- Related: Chrysler Windsor; DeSoto Custom; Plymouth De Luxe

Powertrain
- Engine: 217.8 cu in (3.569 L) Dodge I6; 230 cu in (3.8 L) Dodge I6

Chronology
- Predecessor: Dodge Series D8
- Successor: Dodge Coronet

The Dodge Custom is a full-size car which was produced by Dodge in the United States from 1946 to early 1949, and was also called the DeLuxe in a more basic trim package. Dodge was very fluid with model nameplates and during the 1930s updated them yearly based on marketing objectives, while the actual vehicle was largely unchanged for what became known as the "Senior Dodges" that were available with shorter "Junior Dodges" that were essentially badge engineered Plymouth models during this time period.

== Series D11/D14/D17/D19/D22 ==
The Dodge Luxury Liner Series D11 was introduced in October 1938, during Dodge's 25 anniversary celebrations, for the 1939 model year. The bodywork was shared with DeSoto and Chrysler branded vehicles. The Series D11 was further defined as the Special and the DeLuxe, offering a total of ten body style choices of coupes, sedans and extended wheelbase, seven passenger sedans. For 1940 the Luxury Liner was split into the Series D14 Luxury Liner Deluxe and the Series D17 Luxury Liner Special. For 1941, the Custom and Deluxe nameplates were introduced for the Series D19, a tradition that lasted for the next 10 years.

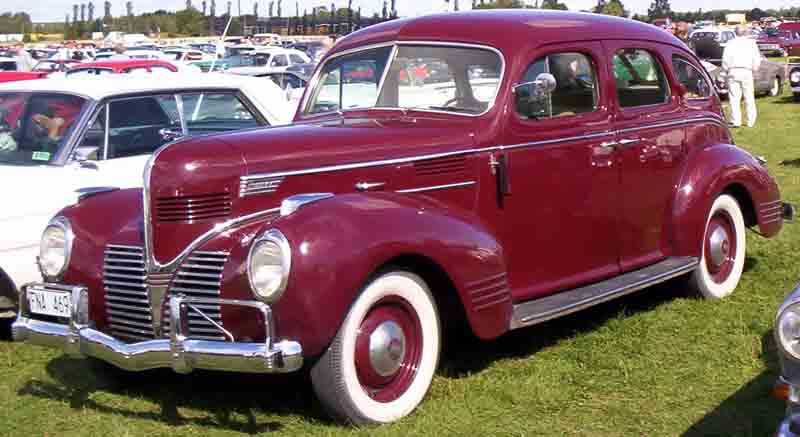
1939 Dodge Series D11 Luxury Liner Deluxe sedan

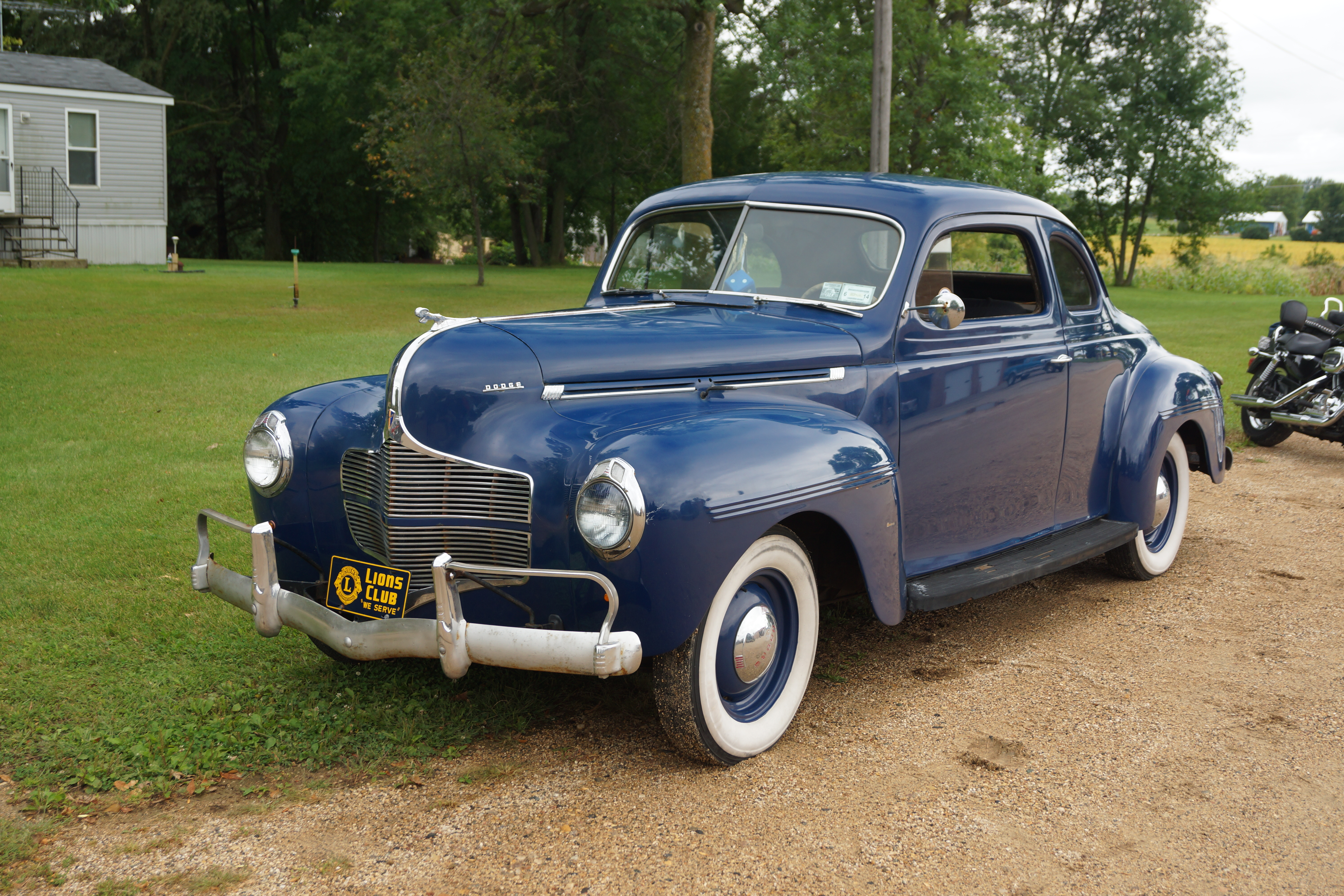
1940 Dodge Series D14 Luxury Liner Deluxe coupe

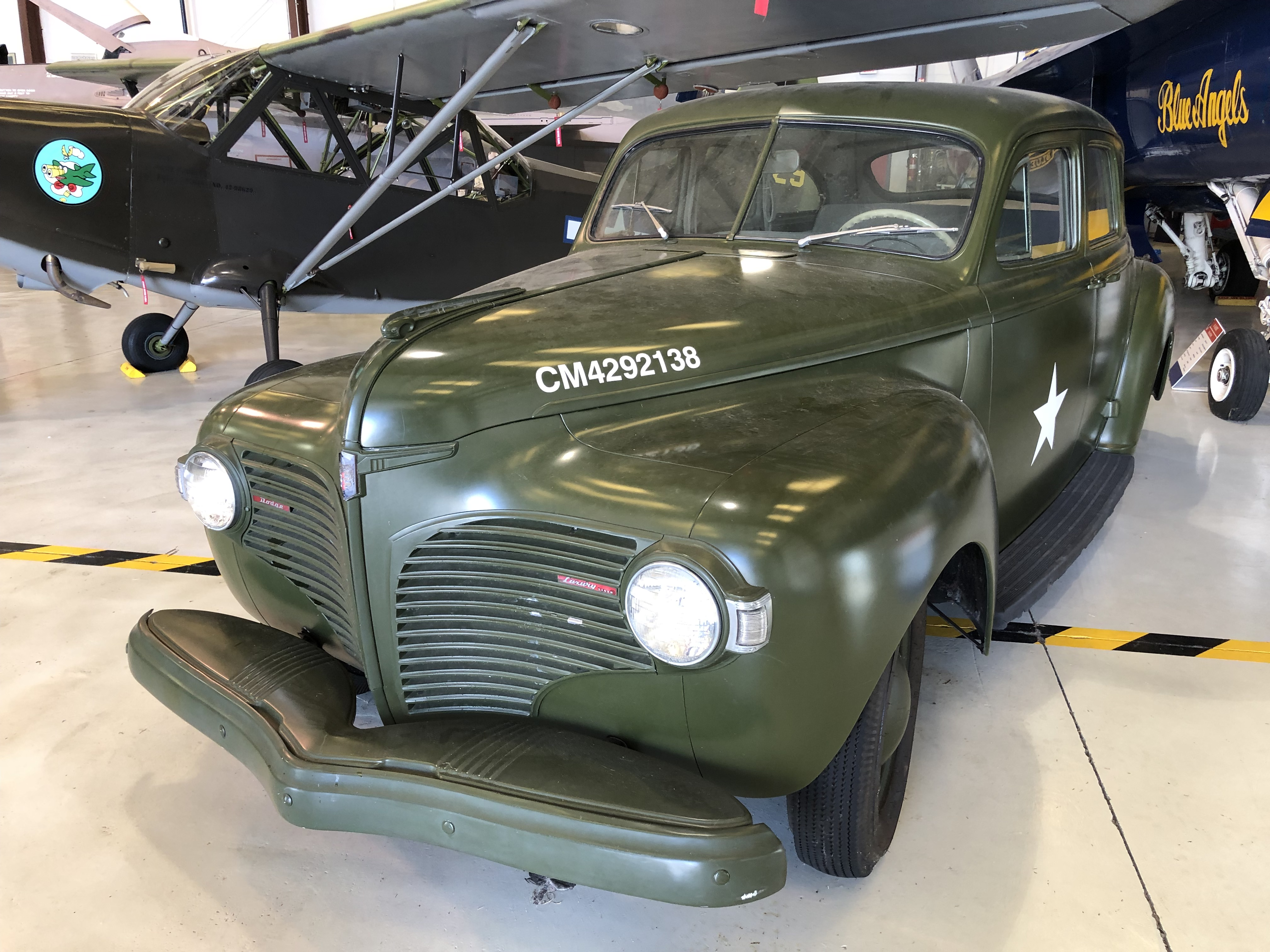
1941 Dodge Series D19 Deluxe sedan

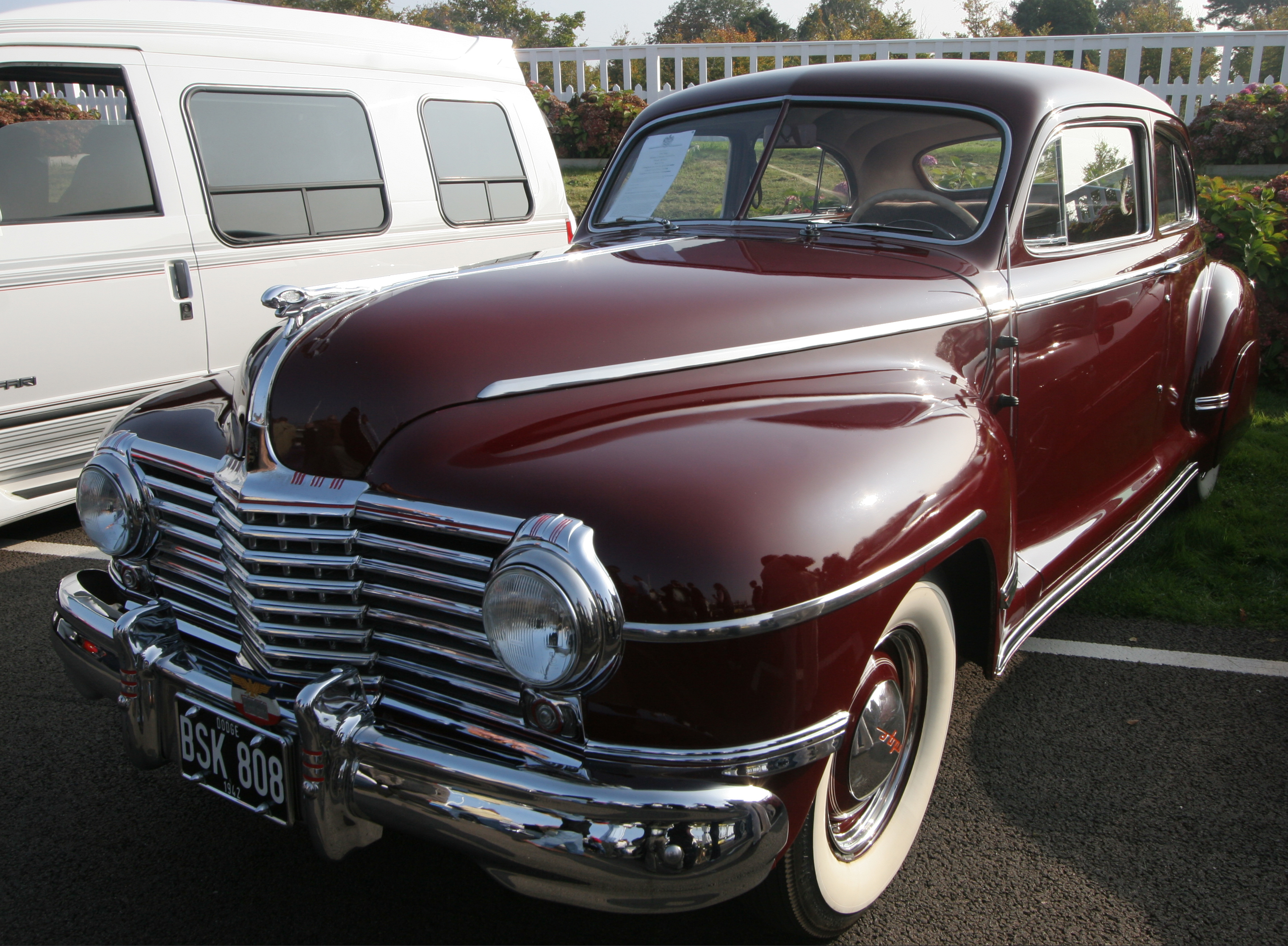
1942 Dodge Series D22 Custom Club Coupe

== Custom ==
The D24 was introduced in 1946, as the top trim level in the Dodge range (bigger than Plymouth's counterparts Dodge D25). It differed from the basic Deluxe model only in terms of interior trim, seats, dual electric windshield wipers and chrome exterior beading around the windows. The Custom was offered in 4-door 6 passenger Sedan, 4-door 6 passenger Town Sedan, 4-door 7 passenger Sedan, 2-door Club Coupe and 2-door Convertible models. The 7 Passenger model rode on a 137.5 inch (3492.5 mm) wheelbase and all other models on 119.5 inches (3035.3 mm). All models were powered by a 230 cid inline six cylinder engine. A three-speed manual transmission was standard whilst a "Fluid Drive" option provided "no metal-to-metal contact between the power source and drive".

Changes for the 1947 and 1948 model years were minimal. From 1 December 1948 all units were considered 1949 models for registration purposes. The actual 1949 Dodge range was introduced in April 1949, with the Coronet name now used for the top trim level. Dodge D24 shared consumers with Pontiac Streamliner, Oldsmobile Series 66, Studebaker Champion, Hudson Commodore and Nash Ambassador.

== DeLuxe ==
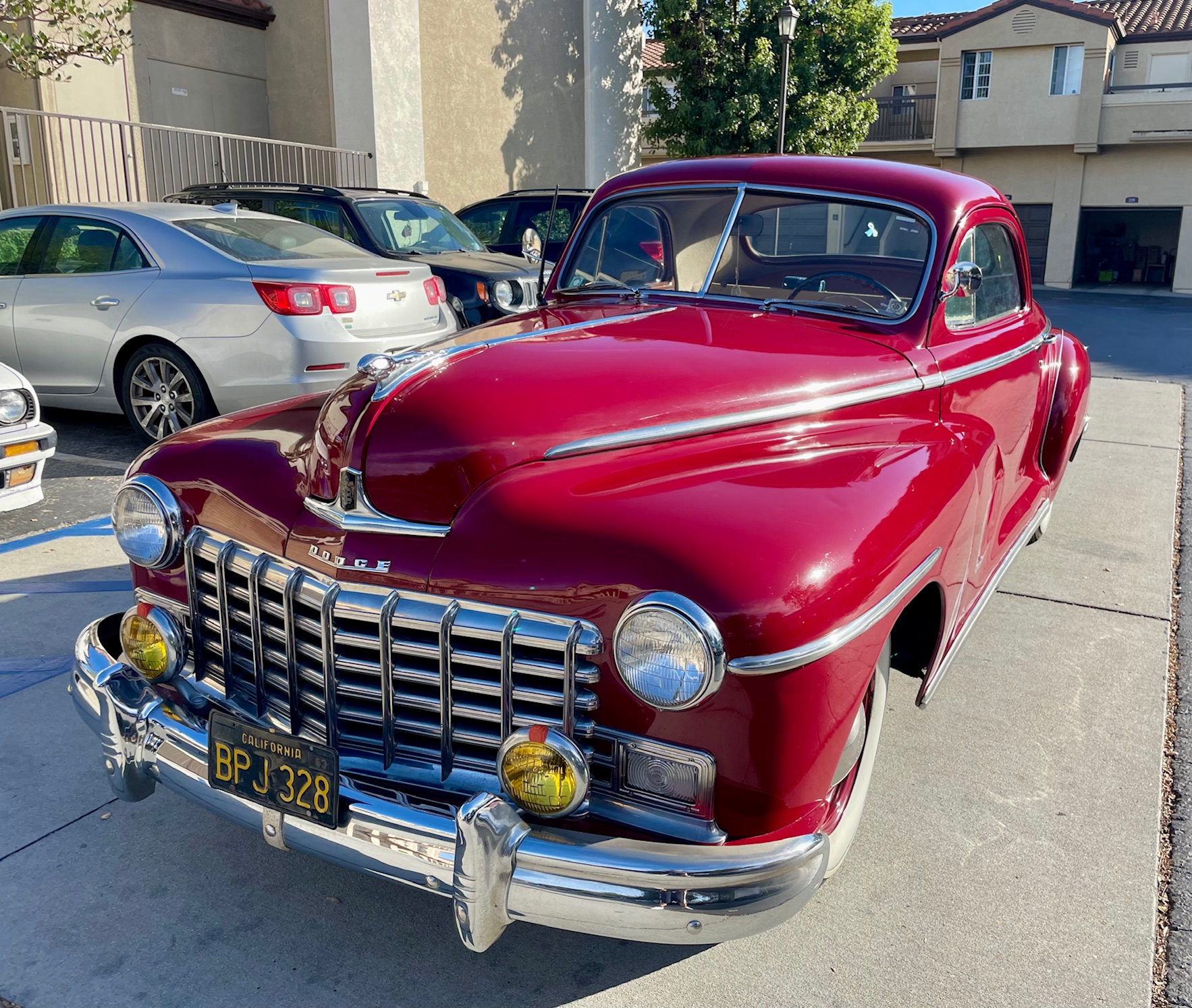
1946 Dodge Deluxe 2-door Business Coupe

The DeLuxe was introduced in 1946 as the lowest trim level in the Dodge D-24 range. It differed from the top trim level Custom in terms of interior trim and seats and it lacked the dual electric windshield wipers and chrome exterior beading around the windows fitted to the Custom. The Deluxe was offered in 2-door Sedan, 4-door Sedan and 2-door Coupe models. It rode on a 119.5 inch wheelbase and was powered by a 230 cid inline six cylinder engine. A three-speed manual transmission was standard whilst a "Fluid Drive" option provided "no metal-to-metal contact between the power source and drive". It used Petrol Gasoline as standard fueling. Changes for the 1947 and 1948 model years were minimal and from 1 December 1949 all units were considered 1949 models for registration purposes. The actual 1949 Dodge range was introduced in April 1949, with the Meadowbrook name now used for the lowest trim level full size model.

== Canada ==
In Canada, the Dodge Deluxe (and Special Deluxe) were used for 1942 and then from 1946 until 1950 for the lowest-priced, Plymouth-based models. They corresponded largely to the Plymouth Deluxe, with some Dodge trim pieces.

== Gallery ==
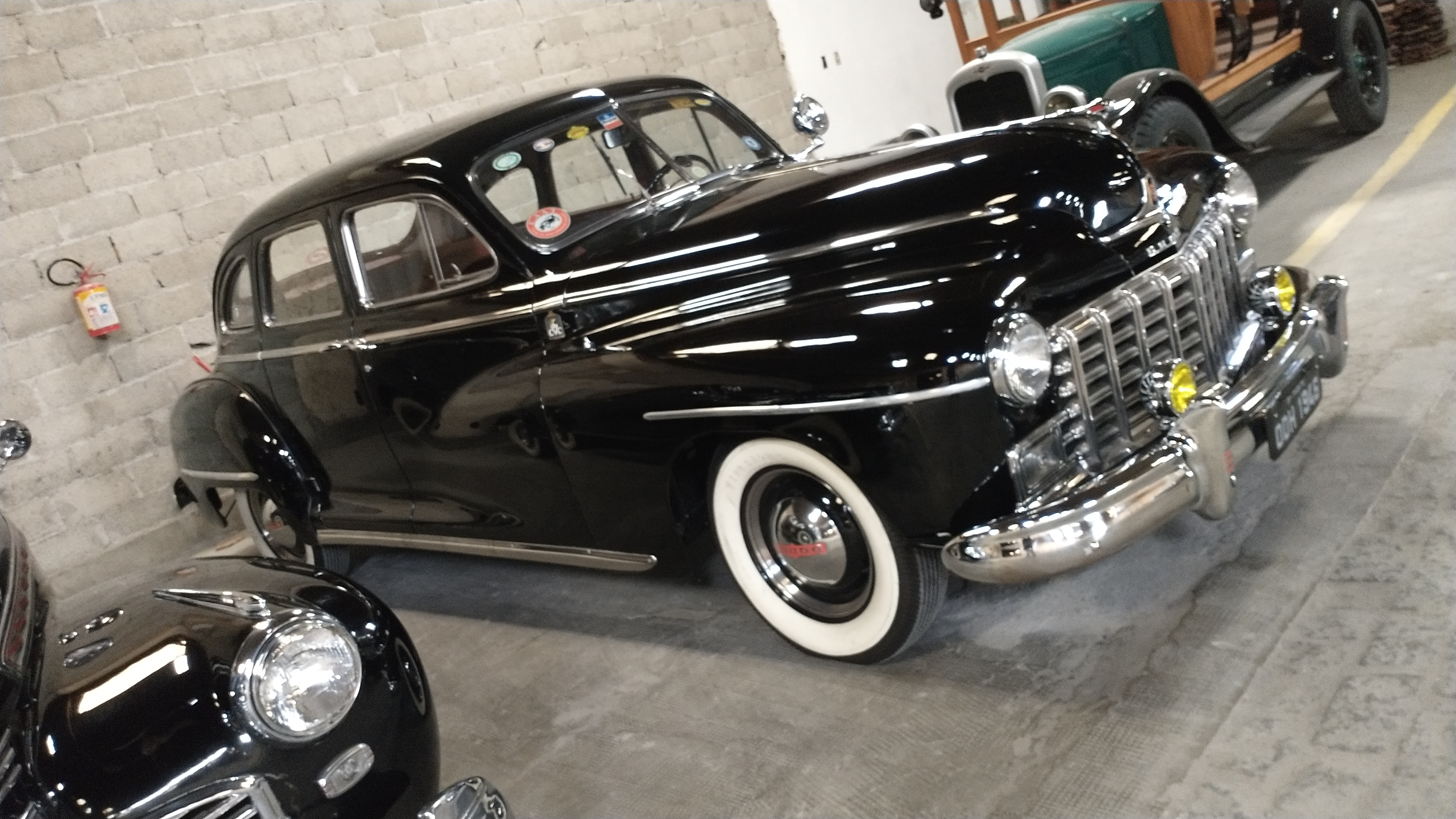
1946 Dodge D24 Custom six passenger sedan

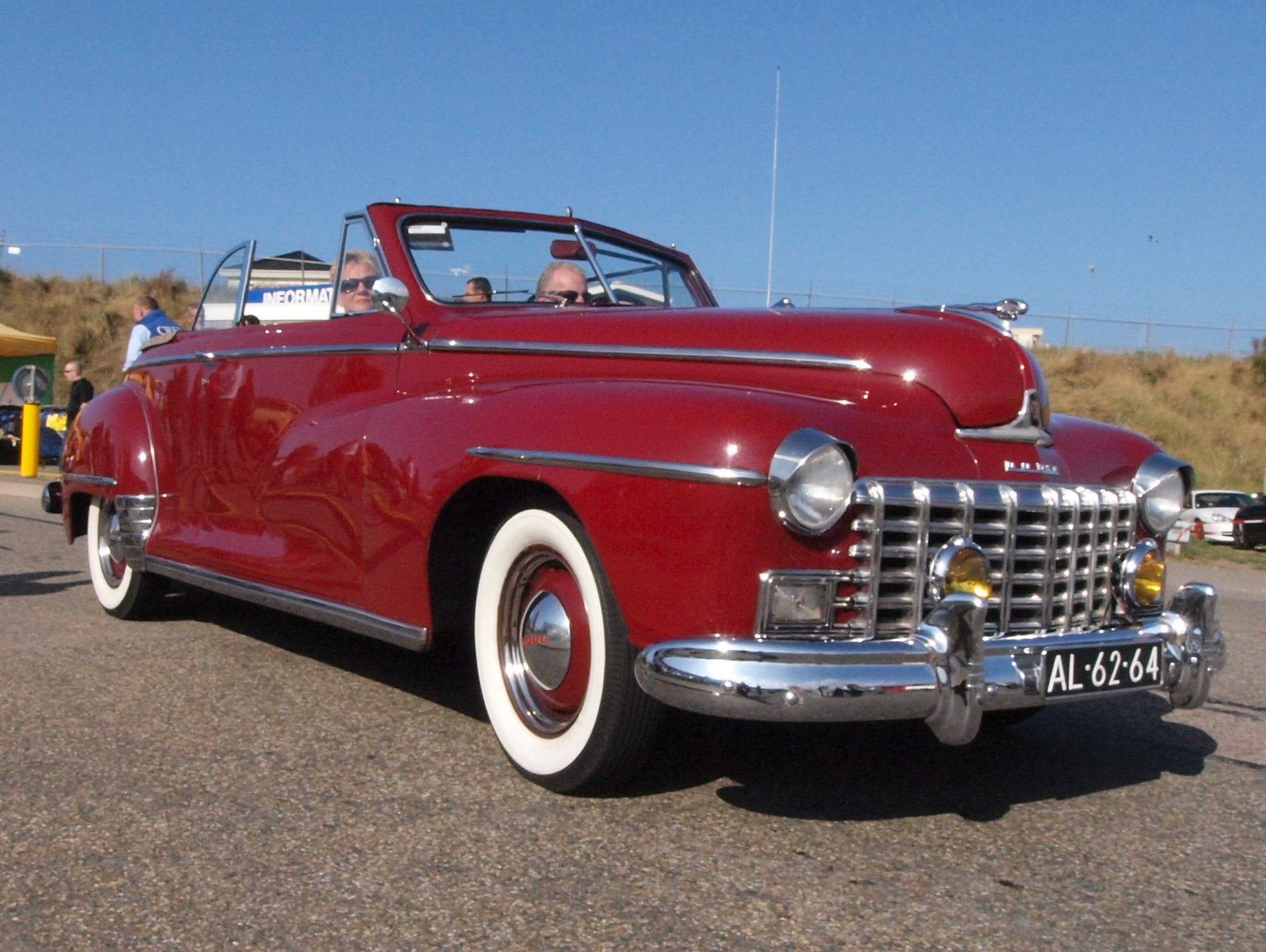
1947 Dodge Custom 2-door Convertible

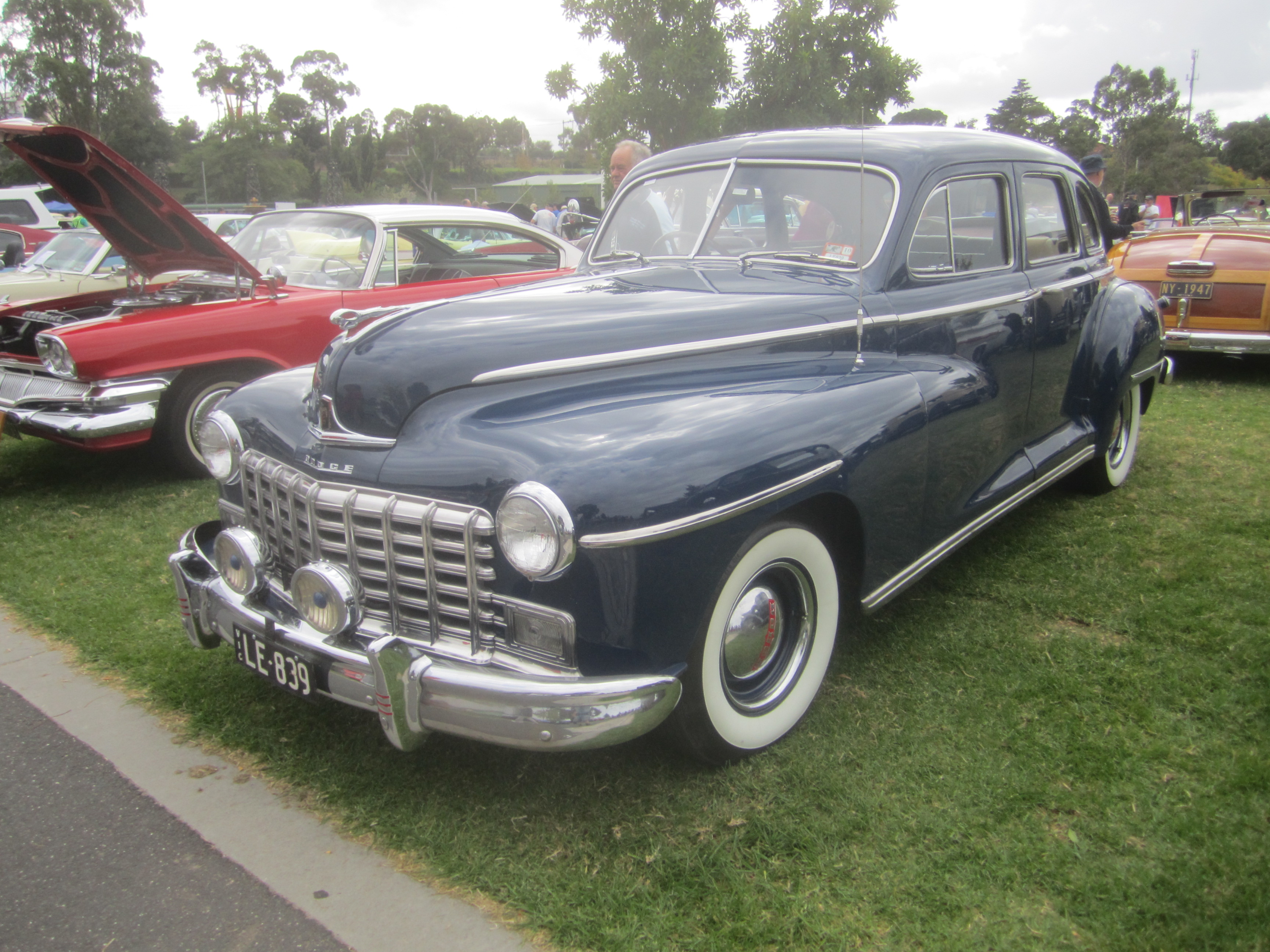
1948 Dodge Custom 4-door Sedan

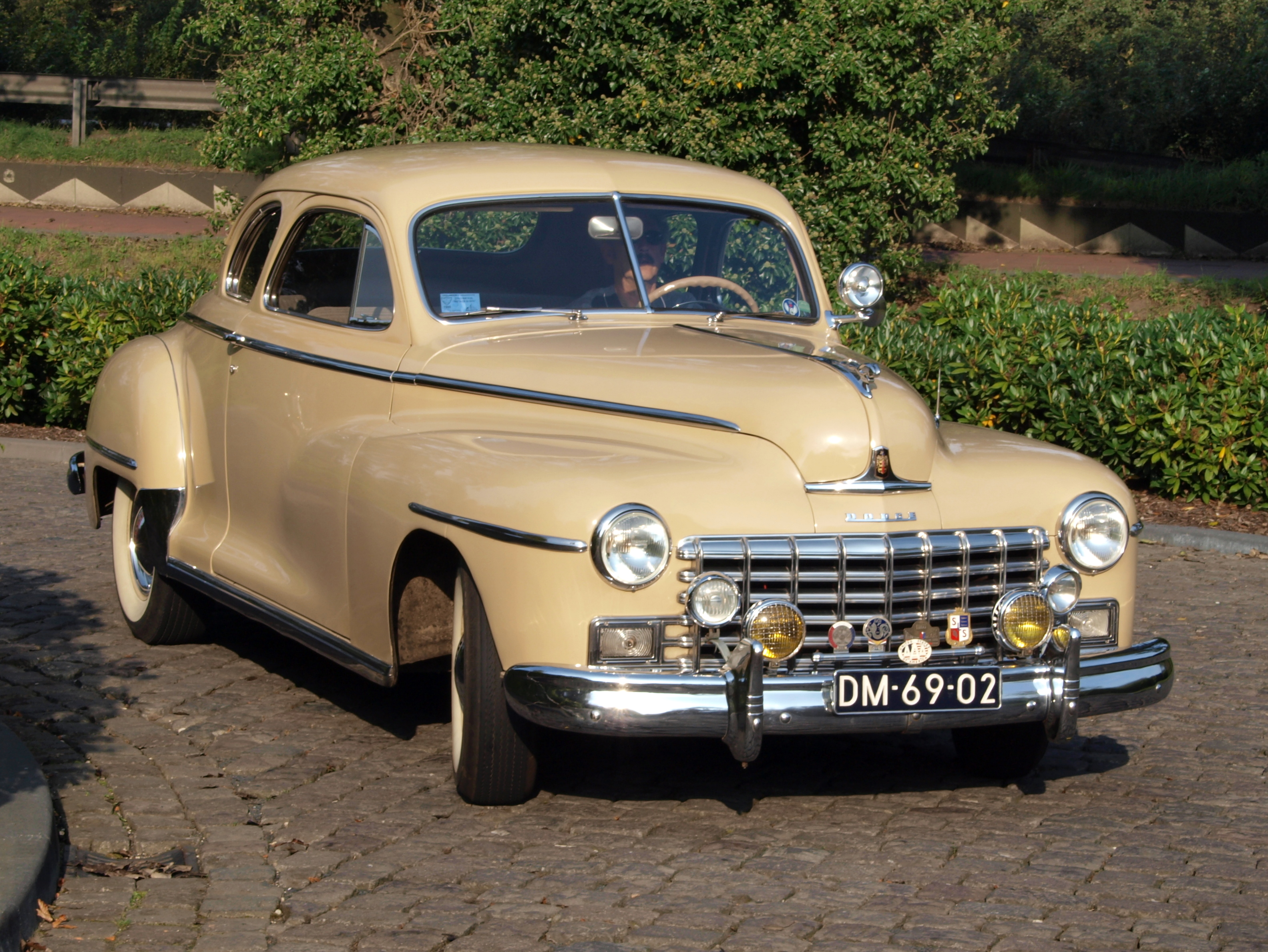
1948 Dodge Custom 2-door Club Coupe

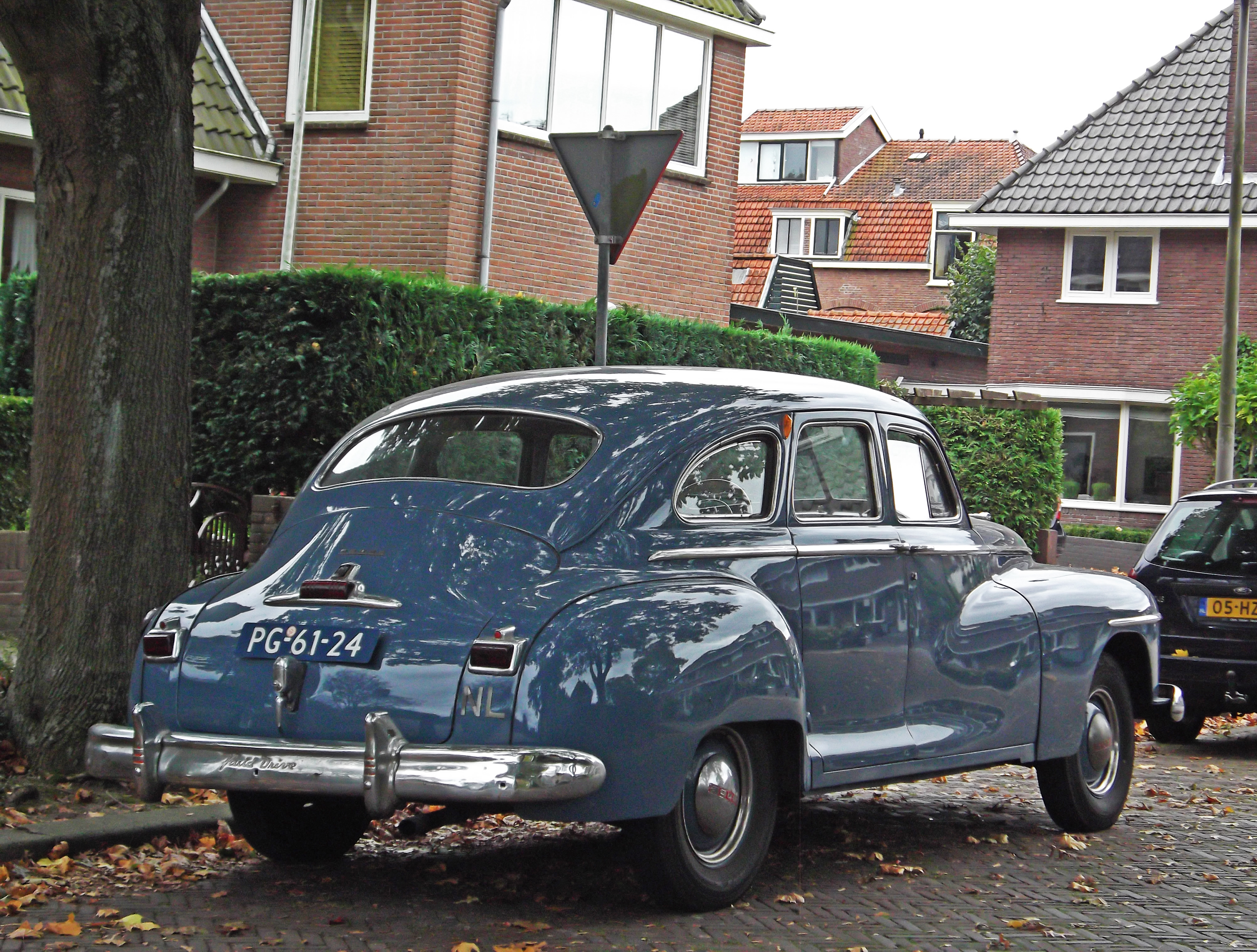
1948 Dodge Custom 4-door Sedan, rear

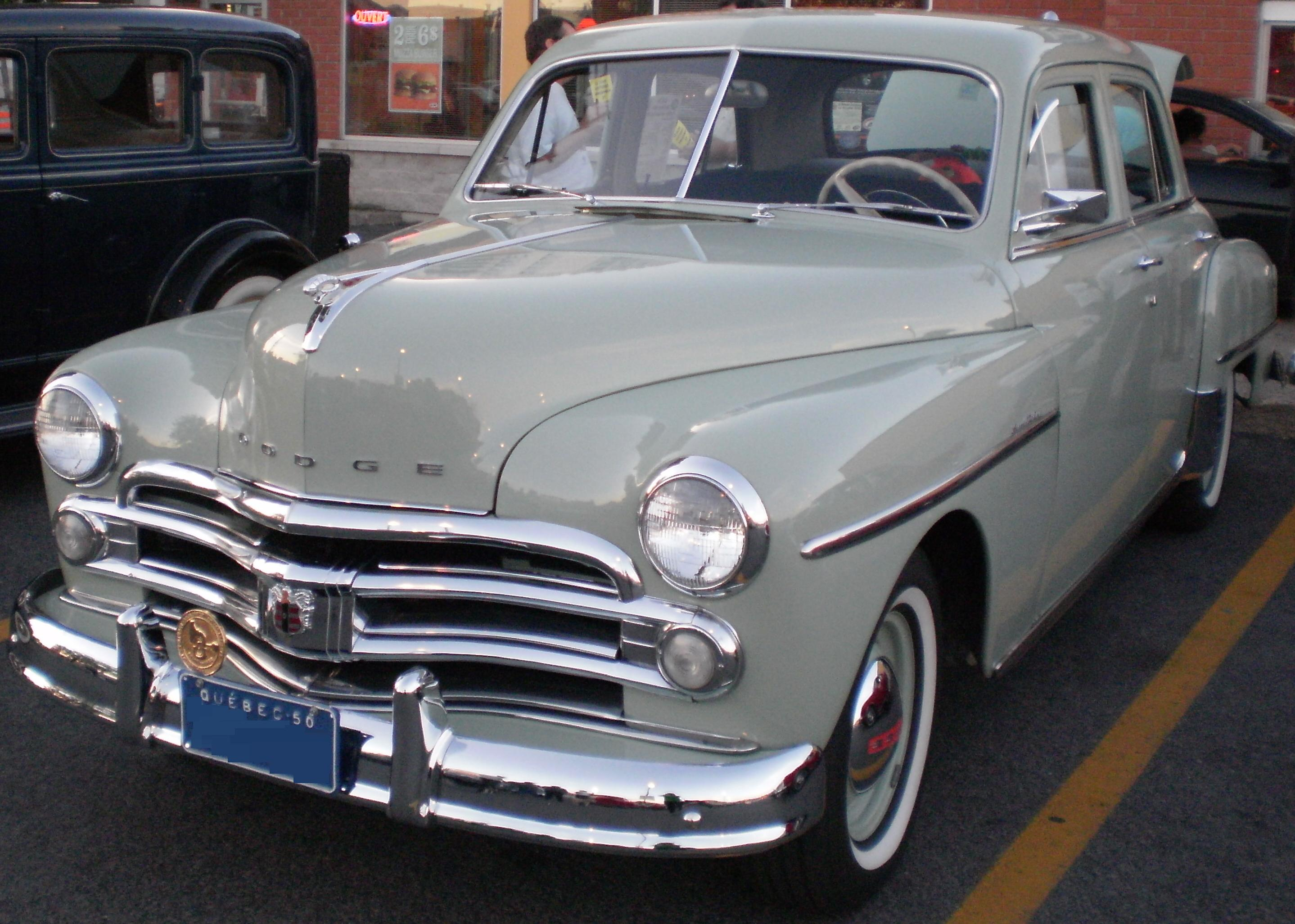
1950 Dodge Special Deluxe, the last year for the nameplate (Canada)
