= Chrysler Windsor =

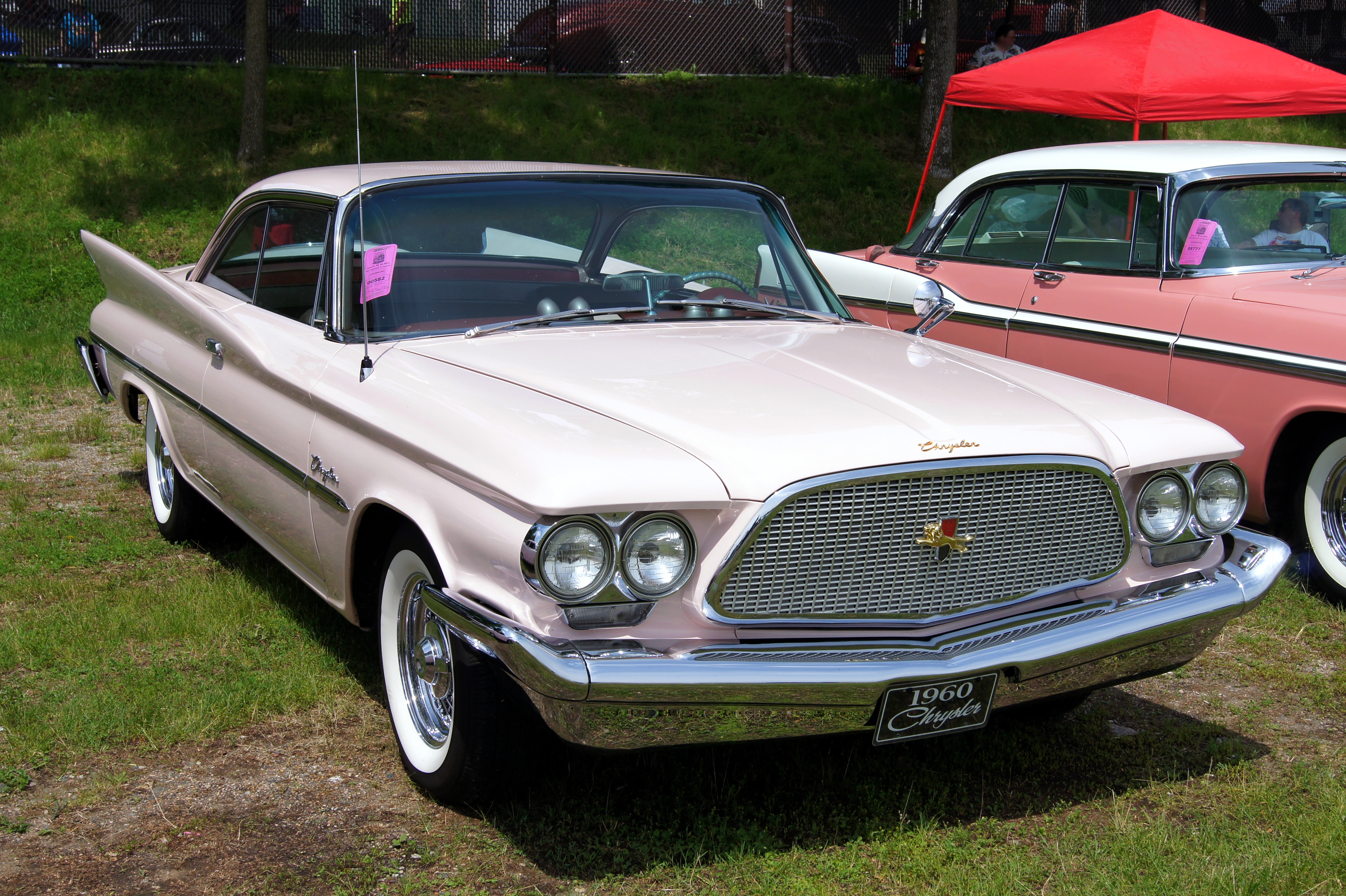
- 1960 Chrysler Windsor hardtop coupe

Overview
- Manufacturer: Chrysler
- Production: 1939–1942; 1946–1961; 1961–1966 (Canada only)
- Assembly: Jefferson Avenue Assembly; Detroit, Michigan, United States; Los Angeles (Maywood) Assembly (starting 1948); Windsor Assembly, Windsor, Ontario, Canada (1961–1966)

Body and chassis
- Class: Full-size car
- Layout: FR layout

Chronology
- Predecessor: Chrysler Royal
- Successor: Chrysler Newport

The Chrysler Windsor is a full-size car which was built by Chrysler from 1939 through to the 1960s. The final Chrysler Windsor sold in the United States was produced in 1961, but production in Canada continued until 1966. The Canadian 1961 to 1966 Windsor model was for all intents and purposes the equivalent of the Chrysler Newport in the United States.

The Windsor was almost identical to the more luxurious Chrysler New Yorker in terms of size, interior and standard features except that it was only available with the Chrysler Straight Six that originally started the company in 1925, which offered customers a luxurious car with a more modest and economic engine. As the years progressed and technology and manufacturing costs improved, the Windsor offered items that were initially optional as standard equipment while maintaining a market position lower in the Chrysler product hierarchy.

The Windsor was mechanically similar to the Royal from 1939 to 1950 and offered more standard equipment and an upscale interior to the well equipped Royal while both vehicles came with the Chrysler Straight Six. As the Royal nameplate was discontinued for the 1951 model year the Windsor became Chrysler's six cylinder coupe until 1955 when the Poly V8 was introduced. For the 1961 model year the Chrysler Newport assumed the market position originally held by the Royal, keeping the Windsor positioned one level above the Newport. Chrysler replaced the Windsor name in 1962 with the introduction of the non-lettered series Chrysler 300.

== 1939–1942 ==
Chrysler Windsor (C-22/C-25)
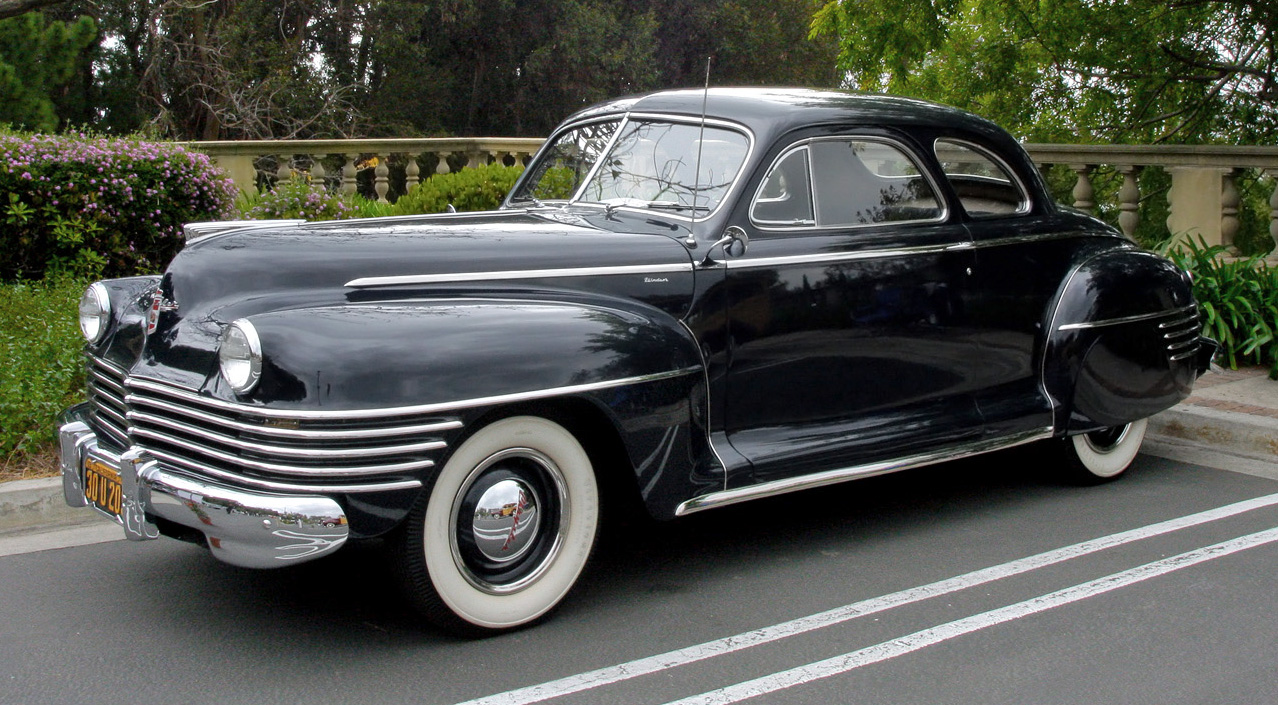
- 1942 Windsor Club Coupé

Overview
- Manufacturer: Chrysler
- Production: 1939–1942

Body and chassis
- Class: Full-size car
- Body style: 2-door sedan 4-door sedan 2-door coupe 2-door convertible
- Layout: Front-engine, rear-wheel-drive
- Related: Chrysler Royal; DeSoto Series S-10

Powertrain
- Engine: 241.5 cu in (4.0 L) Chrysler I6
- Transmission: 3-speed manual

Dimensions
- Wheelbase: 119 in (3,023 mm) (1939); 122.5 in (3,112 mm)(1940-42); 139.5 in (3,543 mm) (1940-42)
- Length: 202.5 in (5,144 mm)

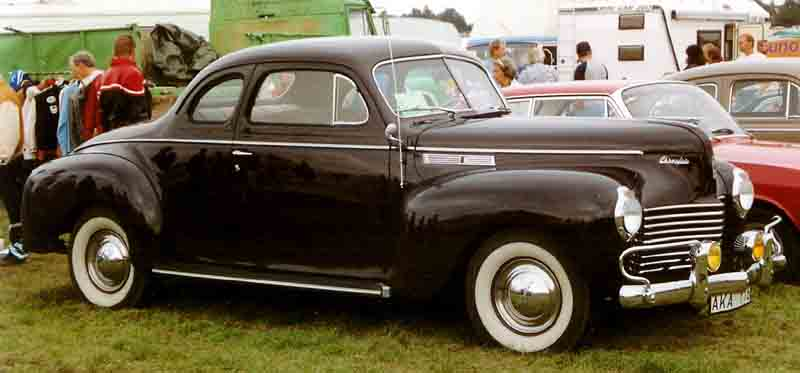
1940 Chrysler Windsor Coupe

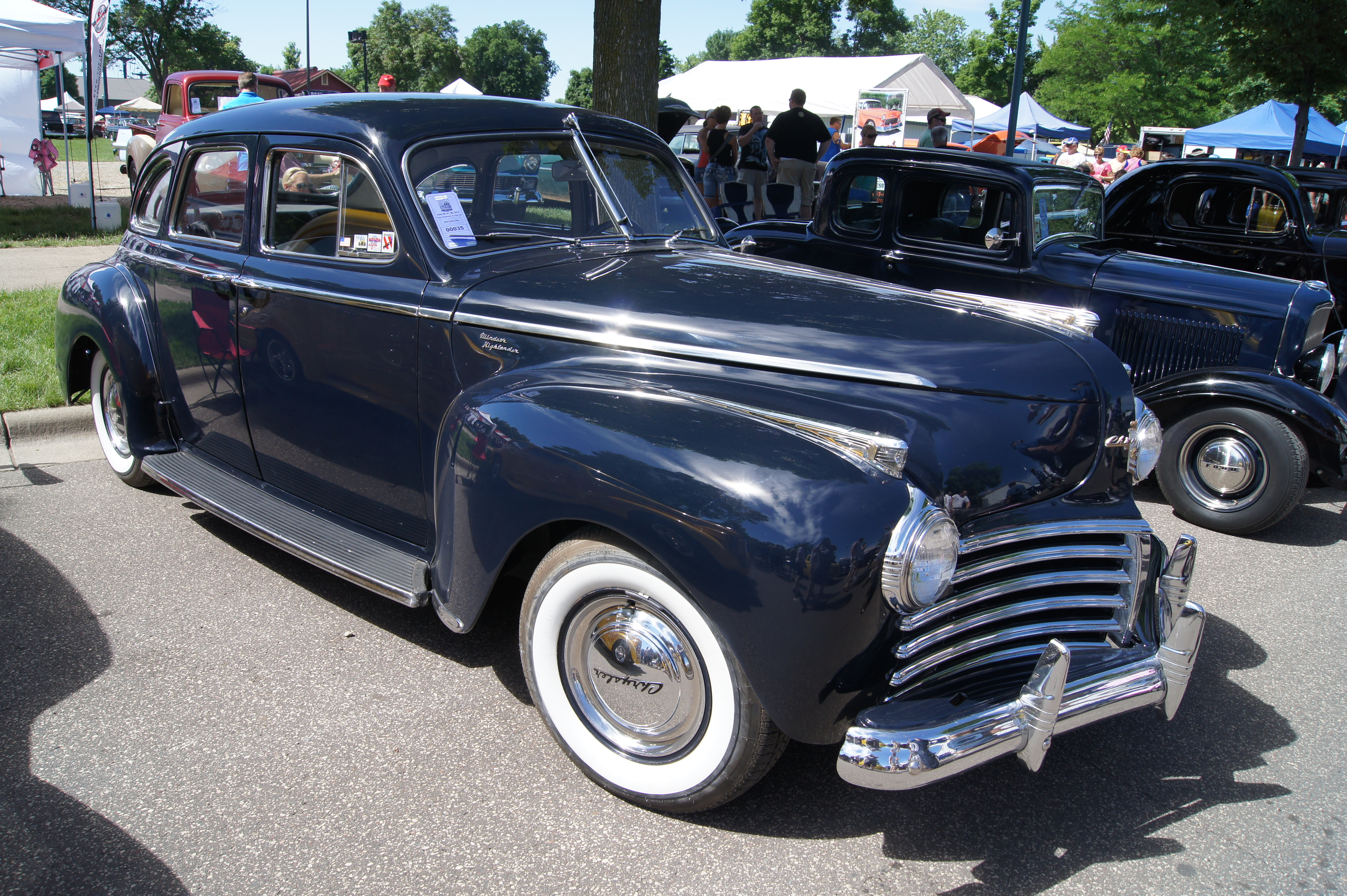
1941 Chrysler Windsor Highlander 4-door sedan

The Series C-22 Windsor first came out in 1939 as the senior model to the Series C-22 Chrysler Royal, and was called the Royal Windsor while only having the Chrysler Straight Six available. It shared the available wheelbase and extended wheelbase with the Royal and offered more standard equipment than the Royal, while the Series C-23 New Yorker, C-23 Saratoga and C-23 Imperial came with the Chrysler Straight Eight. The Royal Windsor was offered in three two-door, with either two passenger or four passenger coupe body styles called Business Coupe, Victoria Coupe and Club Coupe, while the four-door Sedan accommodated five passengers. On vehicles equipped with rear quarter windows they operated like vent windows for additional ventilation. Prices listed were US$1,185 ($27,232 in 2025 dollars) for the Club Coupe while the Sedan was listed at US$1,175 ($27,003 in 2025 dollars). The cowl and chassis was available for custom coachwork and shows 394 were produced.

In 1940, the Series C-25 model nameplates were updated to Royal, Royal Windsor and Windsor Highlander, which came with moleskine leather and Scottish tartan interior, while both the Royal and Royal Windsor continued to be offered in either long or short wheelbase versions as a 6-passenger sedan, a 6-passenger coupe, a convertible, a 2-door Victoria sedan, or an 8-passenger sedan and limousine. New this year were sealed beam head lights. The front grille introduced a wider, simplified grille shared with all Chrysler products and the Royal and Royal Windsor shared an independent front suspension, 11" brakes, and a "X girder" truss type chassis with the other Series C-25 products.

New for 1941 was the Chrysler Windsor Town and Country, a station wagon designed by David A. Wallace, who was the president of Chrysler at the time, and the Windsor name was now separate from the Royal. Fog lights and bumper crash bars were optional, while the grille appearance remained unchanged.

Production ended in January, 1942, as all automobile companies in the USA switched to war production. The 1942 heralded post-war design, with fenders being better integrated into the overall bodywork.

== 1946–1948 ==
Chrysler Windsor (Series C-38)
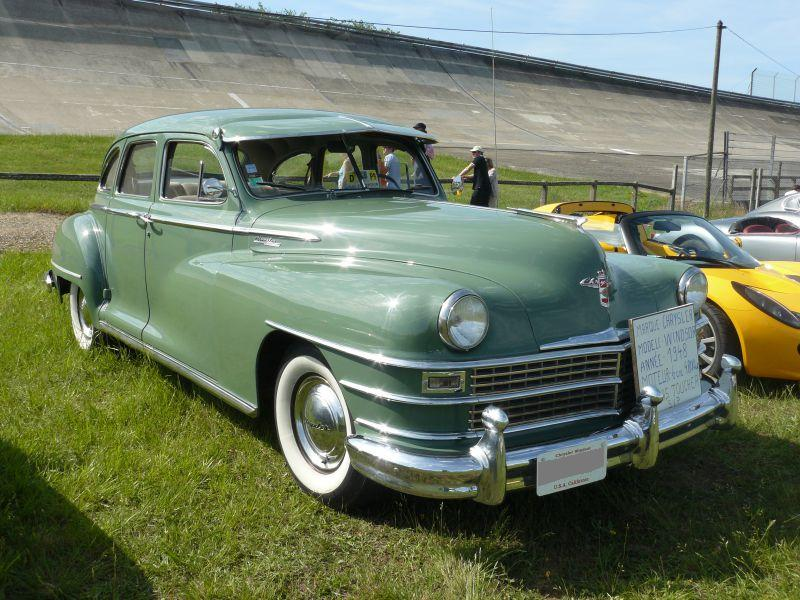
- 1948 Chrysler Windsor 4-door sedan

Overview
- Manufacturer: Chrysler
- Production: 1946–1948

Body and chassis
- Class: Full-size car
- Body style: 2-door sedan 4-door sedan 2-door coupe 2-door convertible
- Layout: Front-engine, rear-wheel-drive
- Related: Chrysler Imperial; Chrysler New Yorker; Chrysler Saratoga; Chrysler Royal; DeSoto Series S-10; Dodge Custom; Plymouth De Luxe

Powertrain
- Engine: 250.6 cu in (4.1 L) Chrysler I6
- Transmission: 3-speed manual w/optional Fluid Drive; Presto-Matic 4-speed semi-automatic

Dimensions
- Wheelbase: 121.5 in (3,086 mm) (6 passenger); 139.5 in (3,543 mm) (8 passenger)
- Length: 208.25 in (5,290 mm); 226.3 in (5,748 mm) (8 passenger)
- Width: 77.75 in (1,975 mm)

After the war, the Windsor was put back into production. While the underlying technology was based on the pre-WWII vehicles when production ended in 1942, the exterior styling for the front fenders and grille were all new. The Windsor offered the appearance and interior refinement of the more expensive New Yorker, sharing the wheelbase, but offered the six-cylinder engine for buyers who wanted better fuel economy and didn't need the more powerful eight- cylinder engine. As a result, the Windsor made up 62.9% of the company's sales, listing the six-passenger sedan at US$1,711 ($24,671 in 2025 dollars) before optional equipment.

For 1947 the Presto-Matic semi-automatic transmission was offered with the traditional three speed manual transmission. The Town & Country station wagon became its own model line but the six-cylinder engine used the Windsor wheelbase as before. New features included a handbrake warning signal that warned that the handbrake was not fully released, and a new die-cast grille. The Windsor Traveler nameplate returned and consisted of a full-length roof rack installed as standard equipment. Tank capacity was 17 US gallons (64 L; 14 imp gal). There was full instrumentation.

Retooling at Chrysler was delayed going into the 1949 model year. For this reason, the 1946-1948 C38 model was kept in production through to December 1948 as the 1949 First Series and production of the 1949 Second Series was started approximately January 1949.

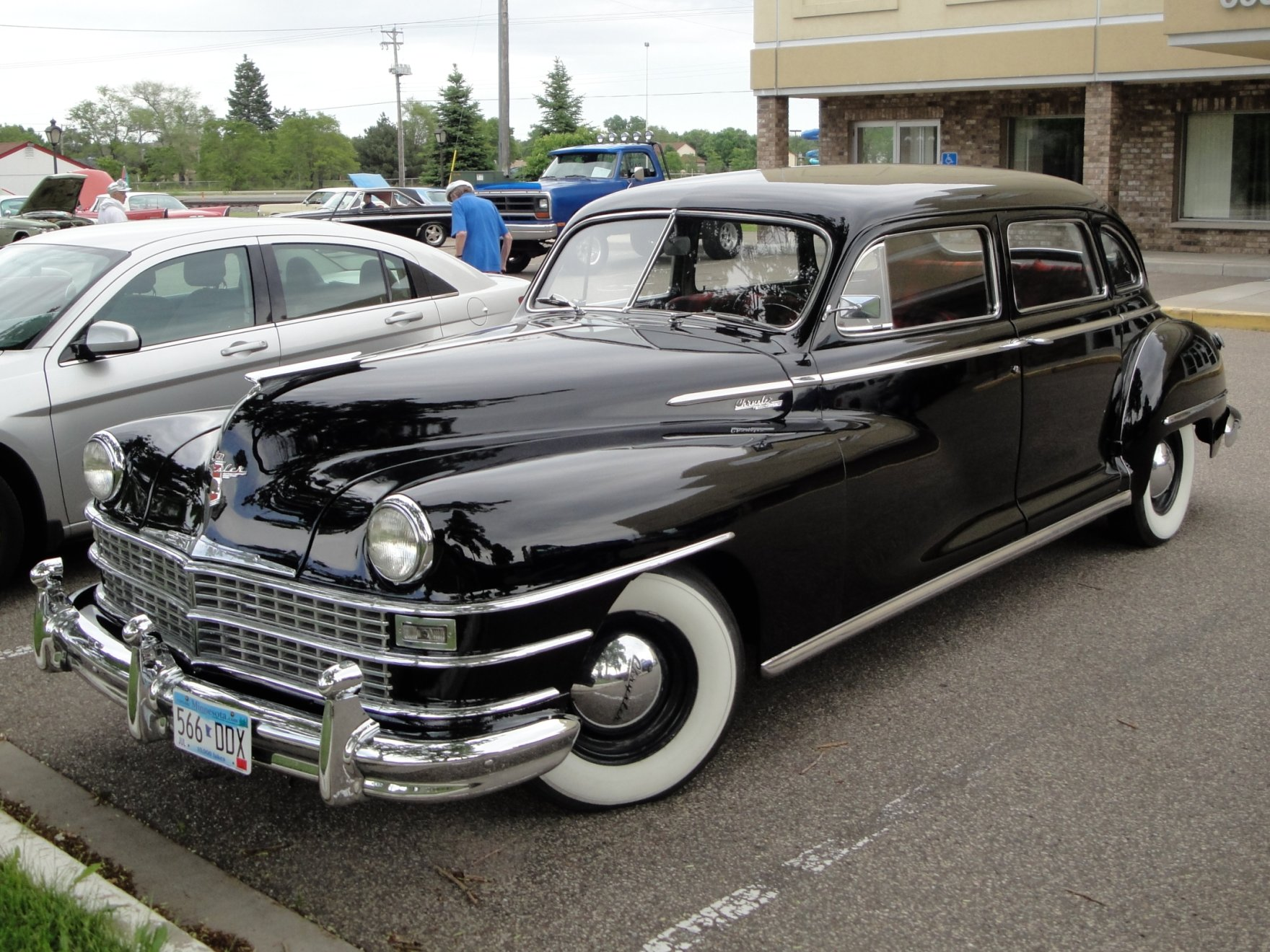
1946 Chrysler Windsor 4-Door Sedan

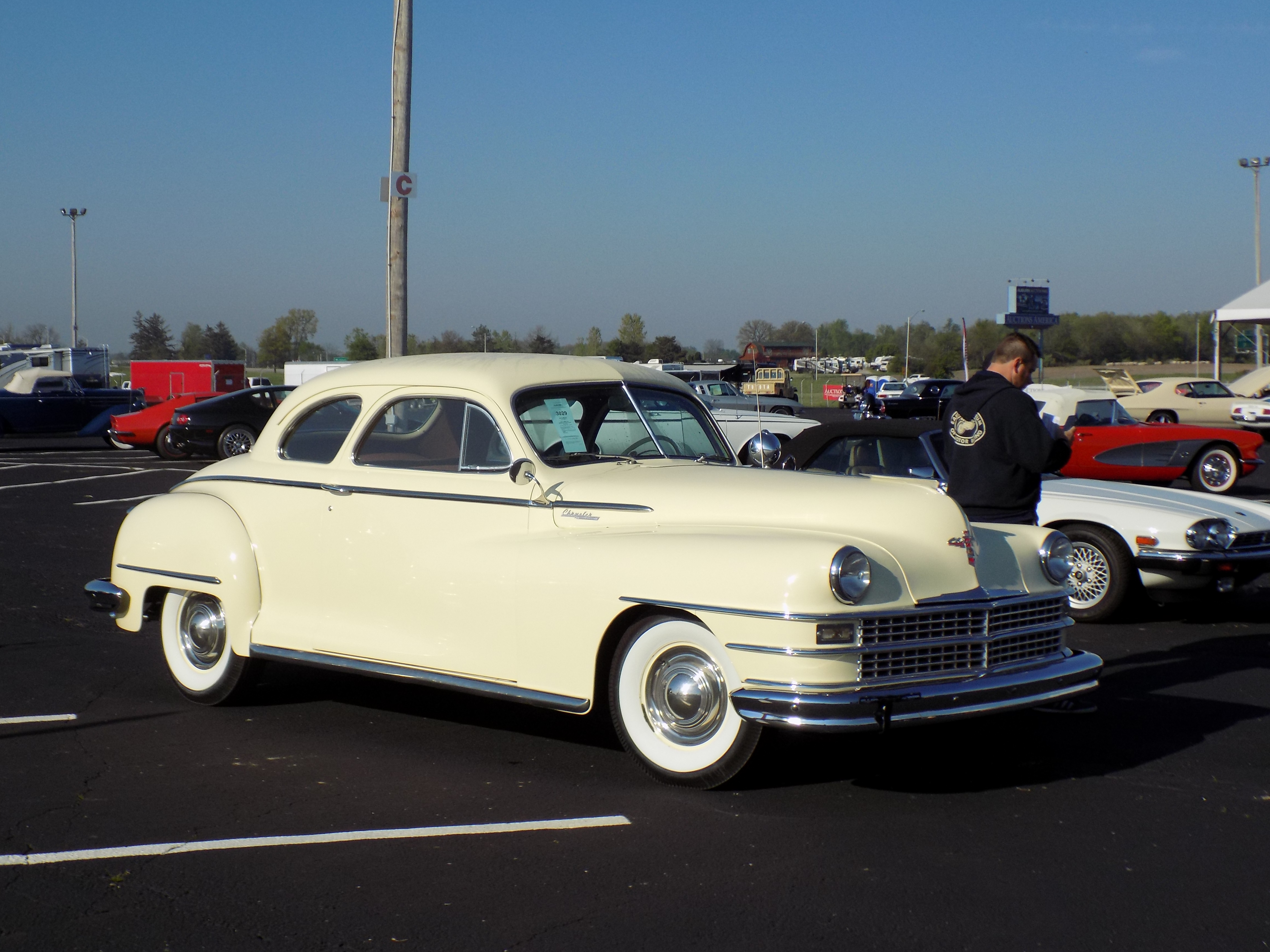
1947 Chrysler Windsor Club Coupe

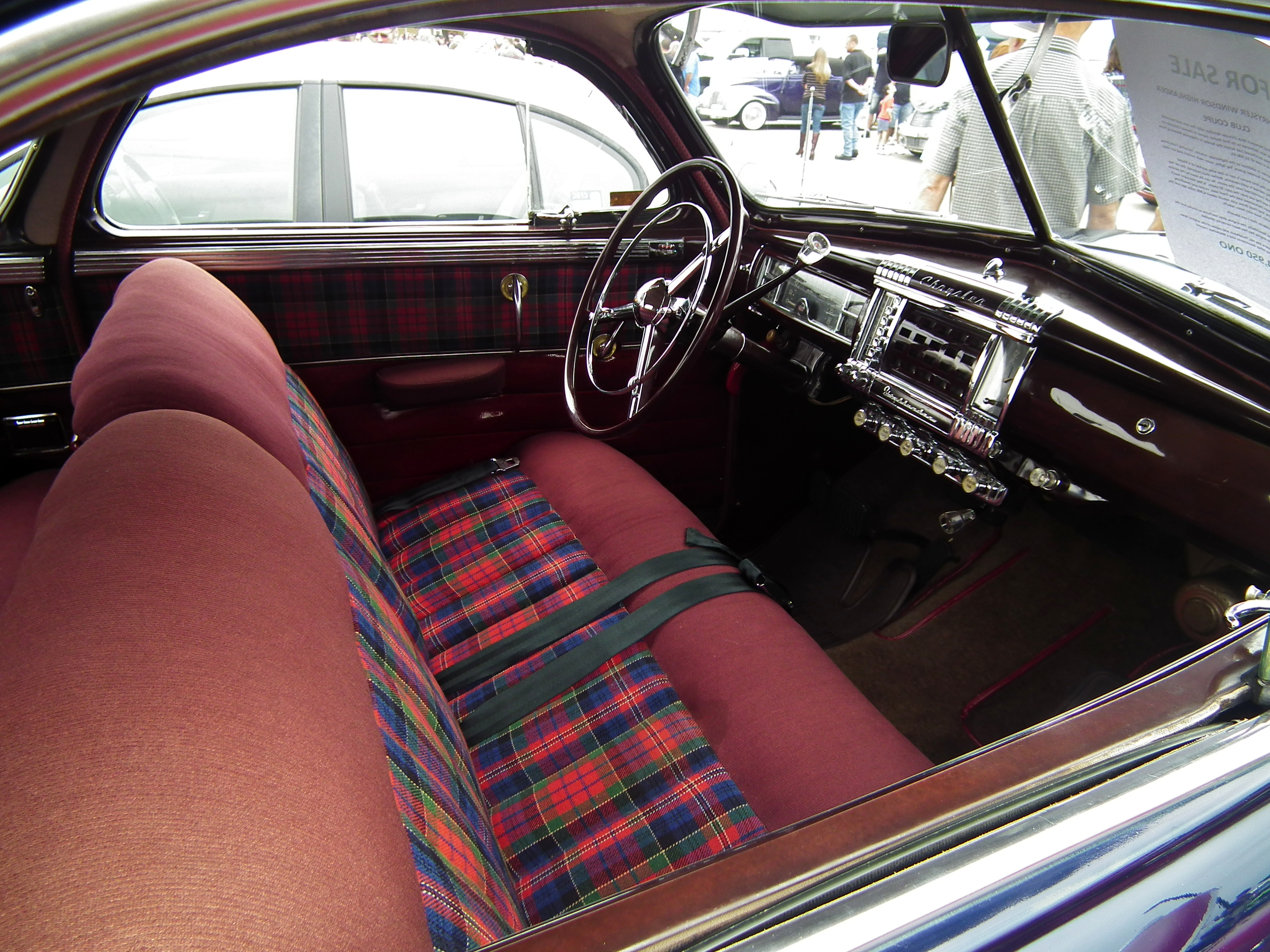
1947 Chrysler Windsor Highlander Club Coupe interior

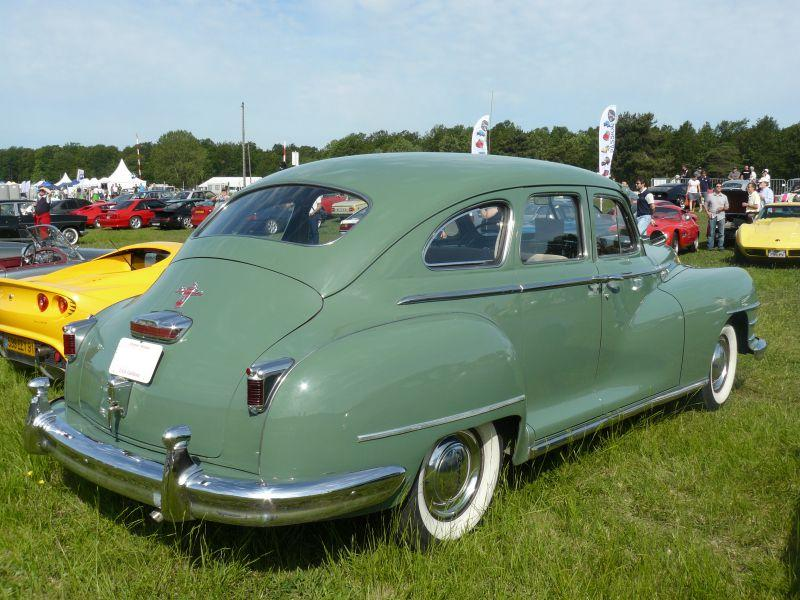
1948 Chrysler Windsor 4-door sedan

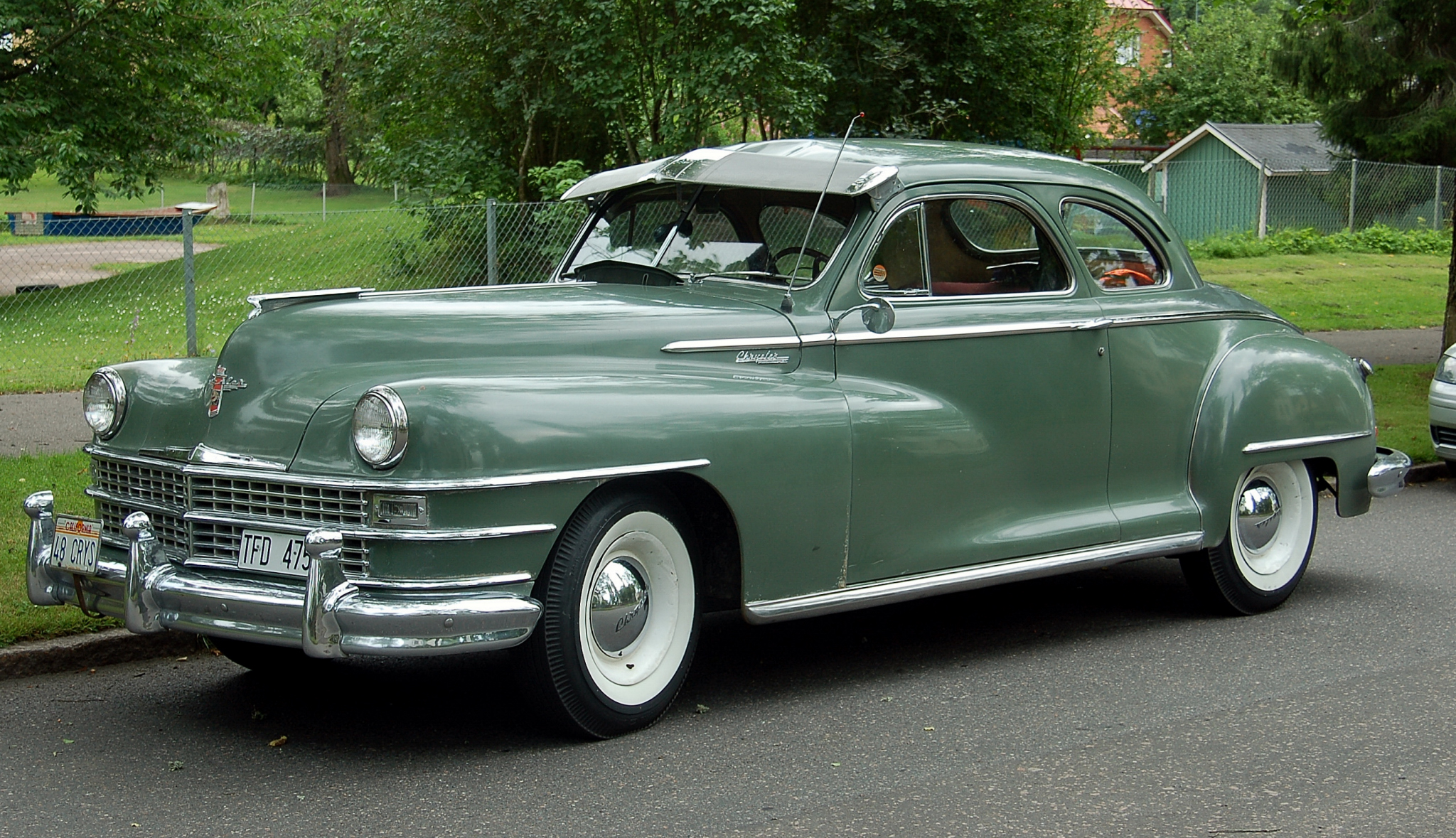
1948 Chrysler Windsor Club Coupe

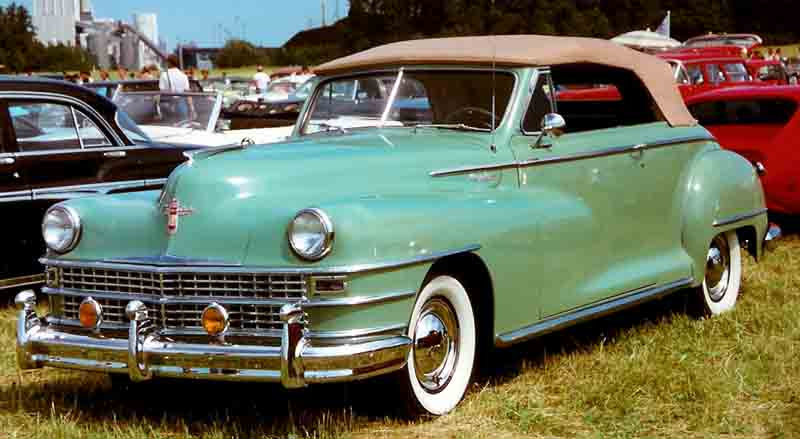
1948 Chrysler Windsor Convertible

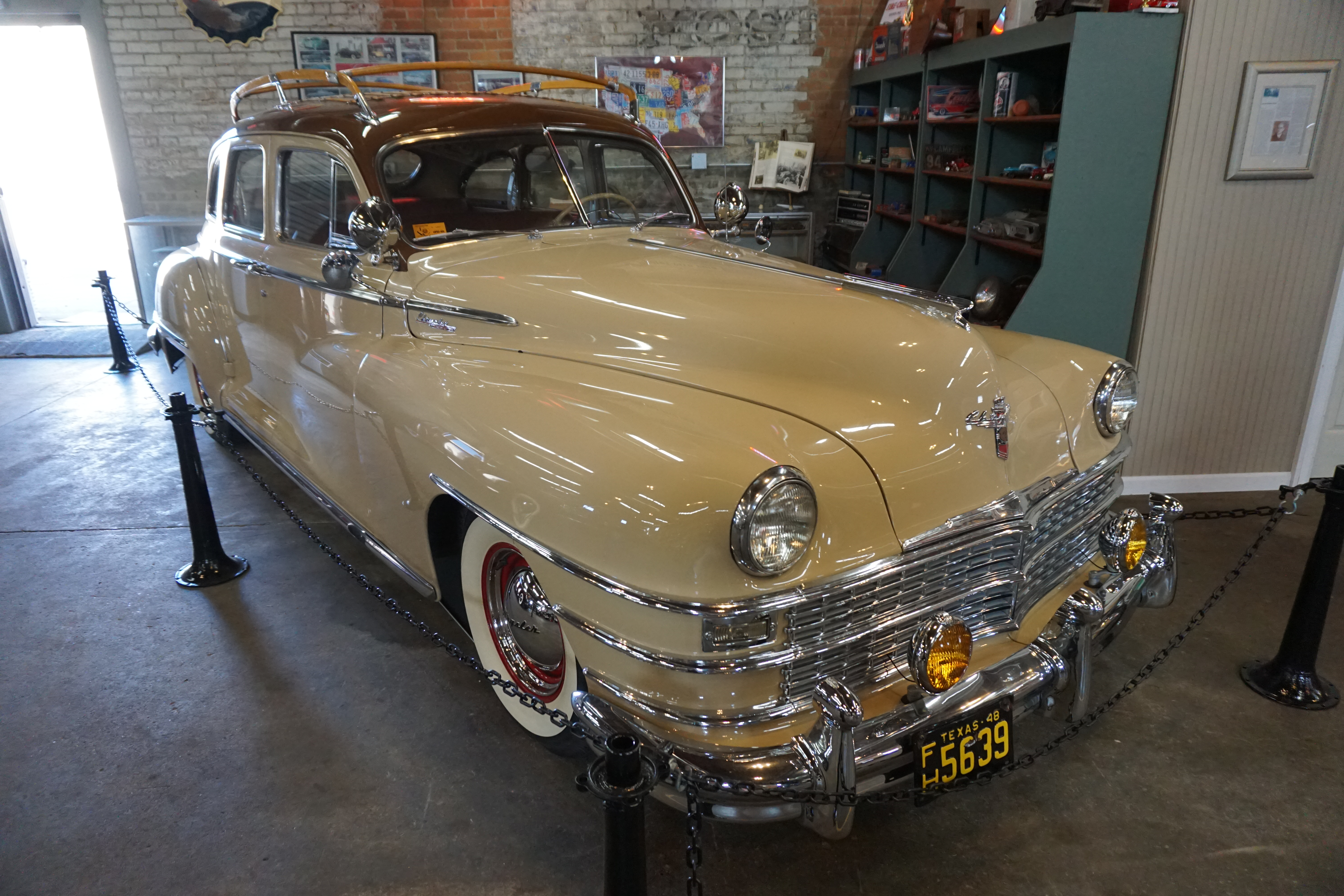
1948 Chrysler Windsor Traveler

== 1949–1952 ==
Chrysler Windsor
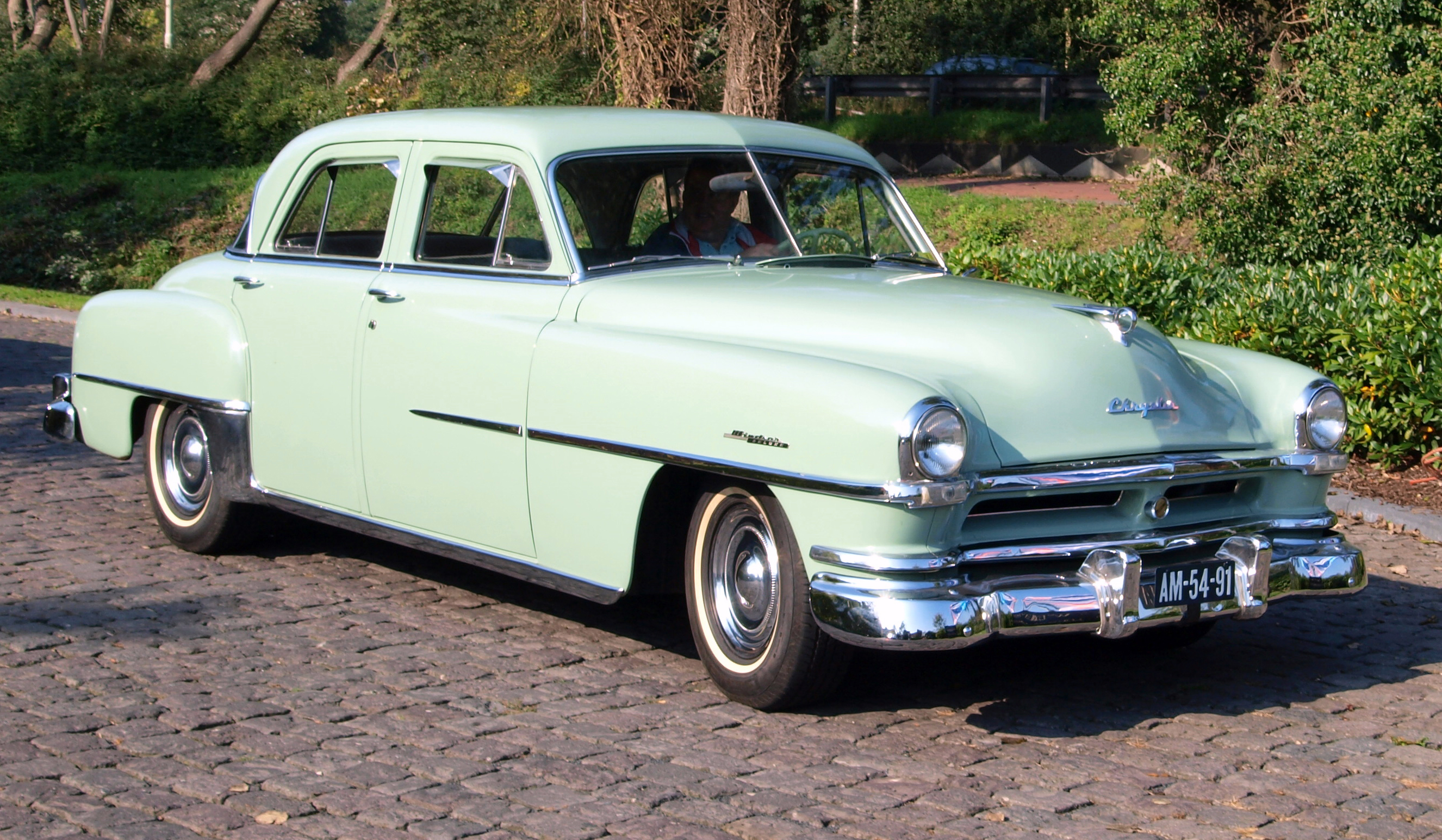
- 1951 Chrysler Windsor Deluxe sedan

Overview
- Manufacturer: Chrysler
- Production: 1949–1952

Body and chassis
- Body style: 4-door sedan 2-door coupe 2-door hardtop (Newport); 2-door convertible 4-door station wagon
- Layout: FR
- Related: Chrysler Imperial; Chrysler New Yorker; Chrysler Town & Country; Chrysler Saratoga; DeSoto Series S-10; Dodge Meadowbrook; Plymouth Cranbrook

Powertrain
- Engine: 250.6 cu in (4.1 L) Chrysler I6
- Transmission: Prestomatic 4-speed semi-automatic

Dimensions
- Wheelbase: 121.5 in (3,086 mm)
- Length: 208.25 in (5,290 mm); 207.3"(1951)
- Width: 77.75 in (1,975 mm)

In 1949, for Chrysler's 25th anniversary, Windsors were updated and shared a corporate appearance with the all-new Chrysler Imperial sedan along with the limousine as the top luxury car for Chrysler in 1950. New this year was a padded dashboard with sponge rubber for safety while the Windsor continued to offer only a six cylinder engine which was shared with DeSoto, Dodge and Plymouth products. The 1949 through 1952 Chryslers continued the Highlander trimmed cars which added an interior trimmed in a tartan fabric and leather, available on all bodies except the station wagon. The Highlanders came with most options standard, including full wheel covers and radio.

In 1950, the Windsor Traveler Sedan which had a standard equipment roof rack installed continued until the Town & Country was added to the Windsor product line. The Windsor still had full instrumentation. The "Windsor Newport" hardtop coupe bodystyle, seating six and with a three-piece wraparound rear window was new for the year and reserved for the Windsor and New Yorker.

1951, the Royal was dropped, and the Windsor became Chrysler's entry-level car, while still higher in standard equipment and interior treatment above DeSoto, Dodge and Plymouth. The costly egg crate-style grille was deleted in favor of painted metal and two broad chrome strips. The Windsor DeLuxe had an electric clock standard, while electric windows were optional. In the September 1951 issue of Popular Mechanics, readers reported getting an average of 14.1 mpg with the Windsor and 98 percent reported liking the padded dashboard.

Little changed in 1952. Power brakes were standard on the Windsor DeLuxe 6-passenger sedan.

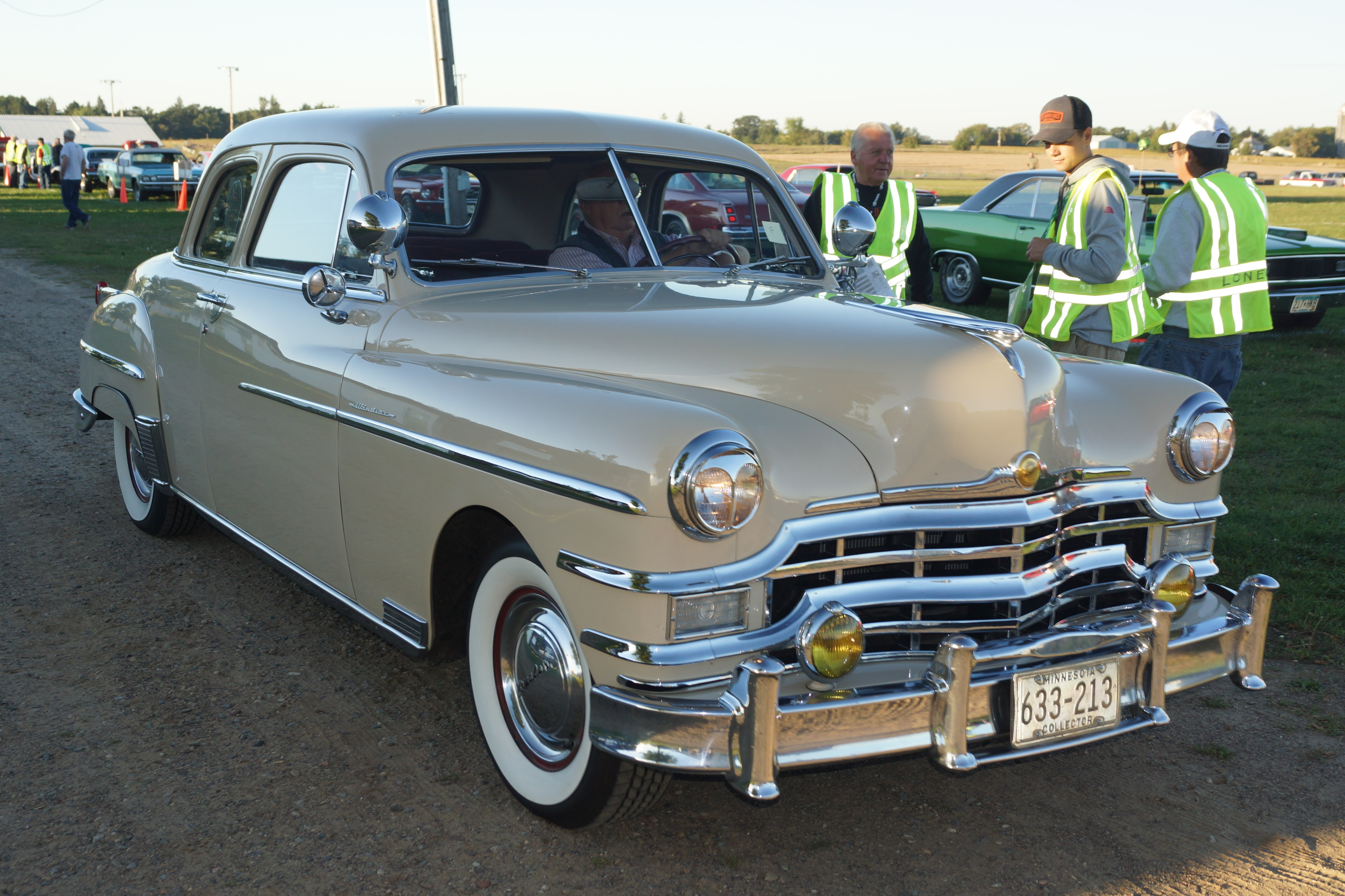
1949 Chrysler Windsor Club Coupe

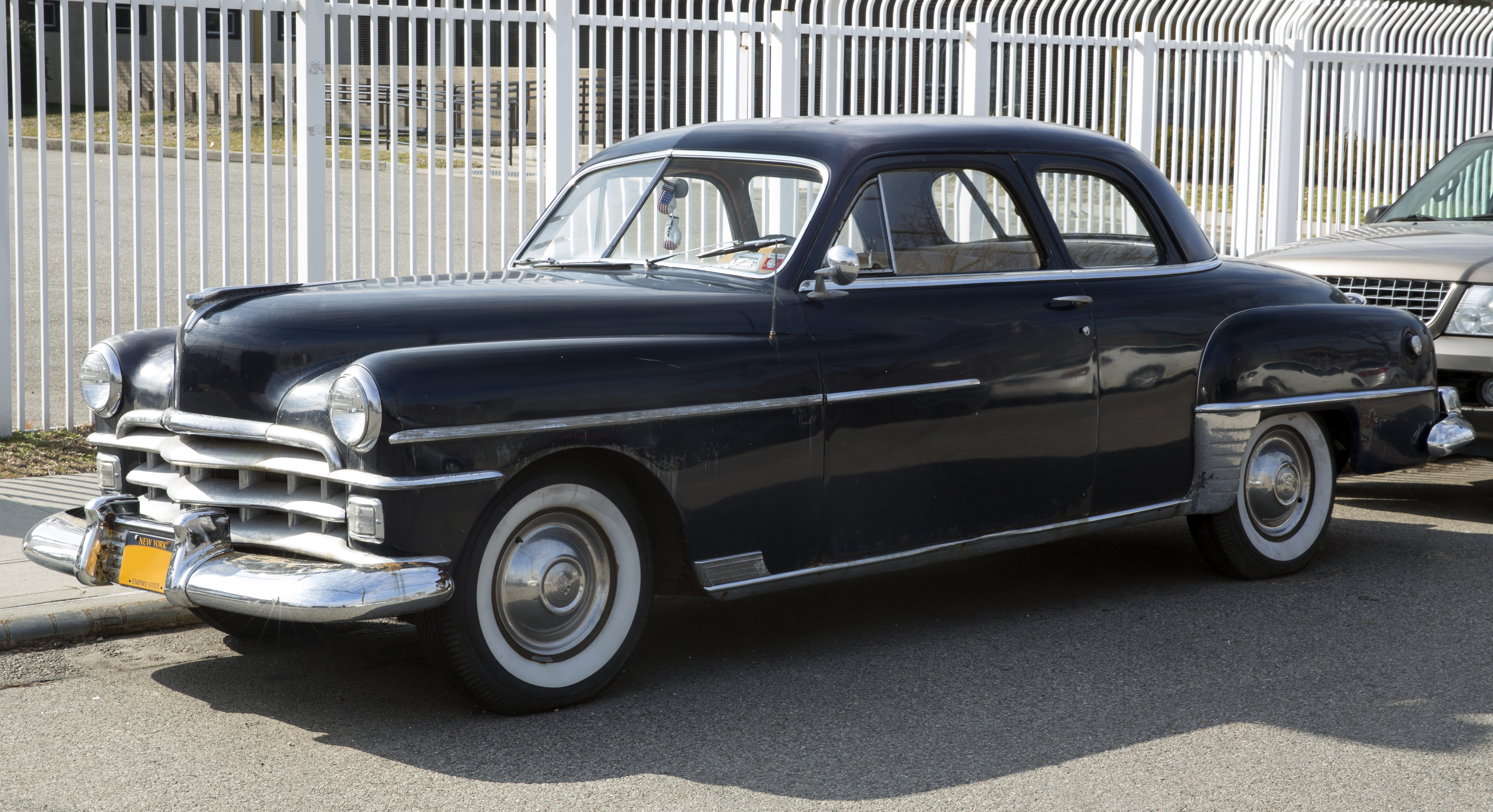
1950 Chrysler Windsor Six-Passenger Club Coupe

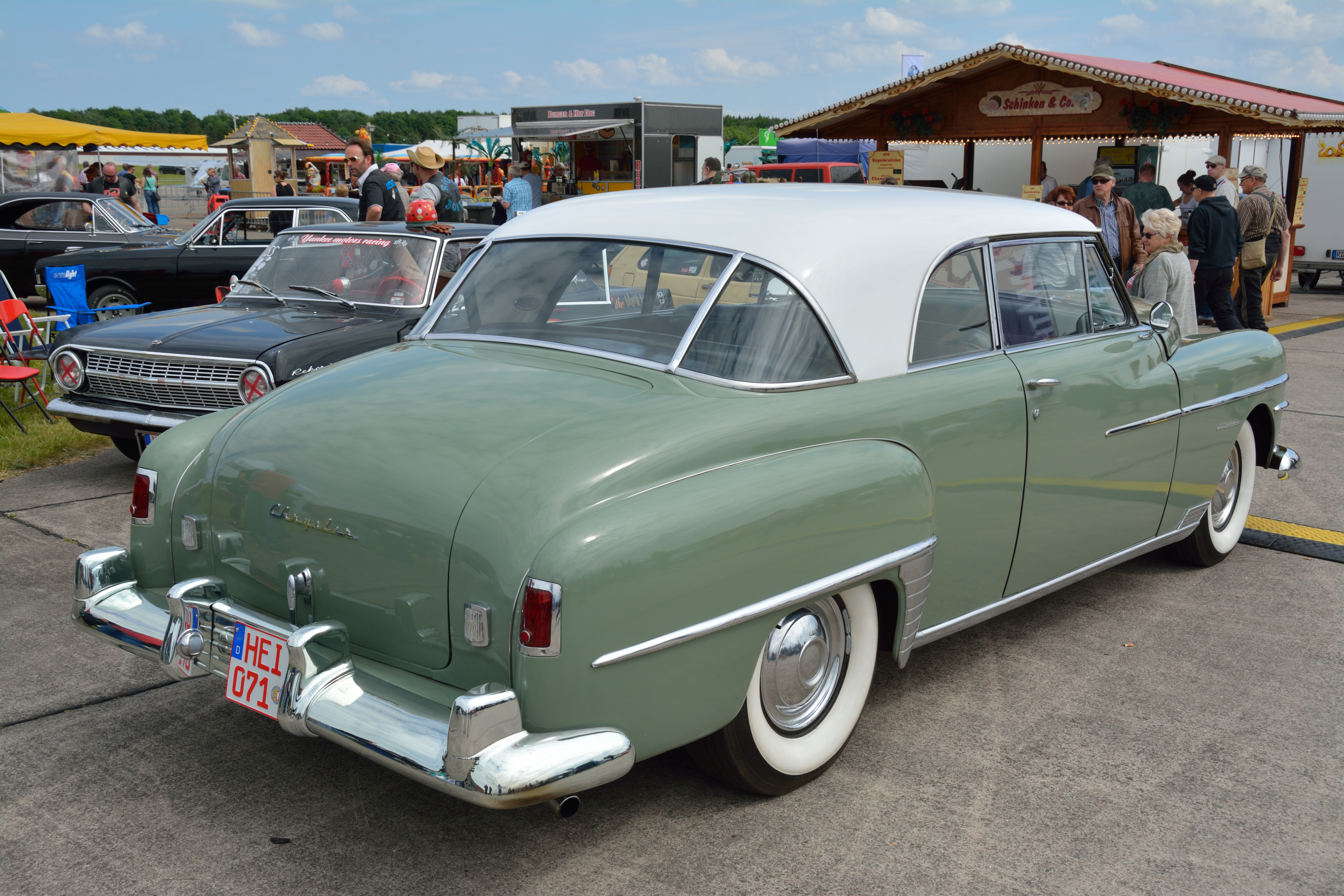
1950 Chrysler Windsor Newport (rear)

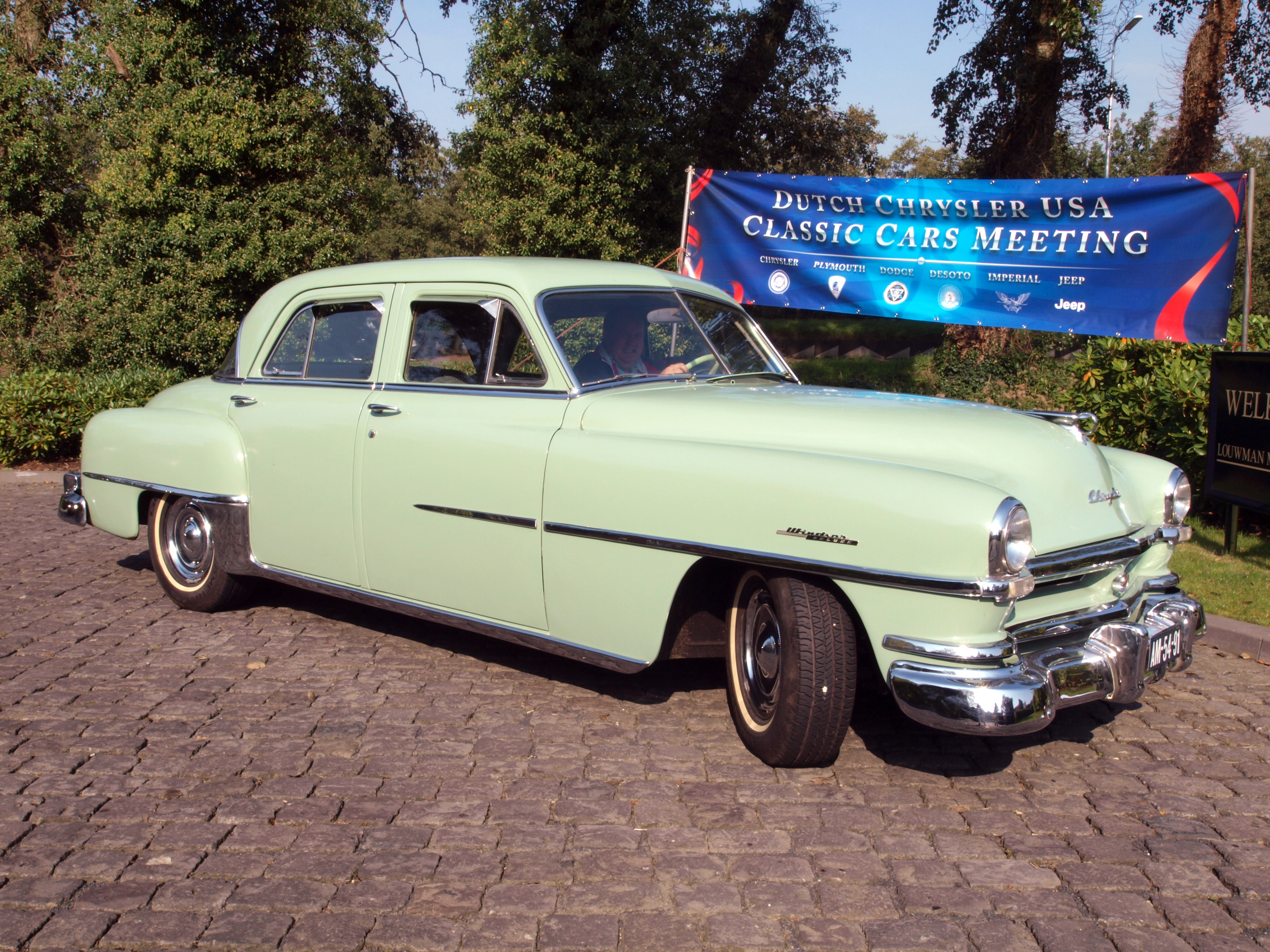
1951 Chrysler Windsor DeLuxe Six-Passenger Sedan

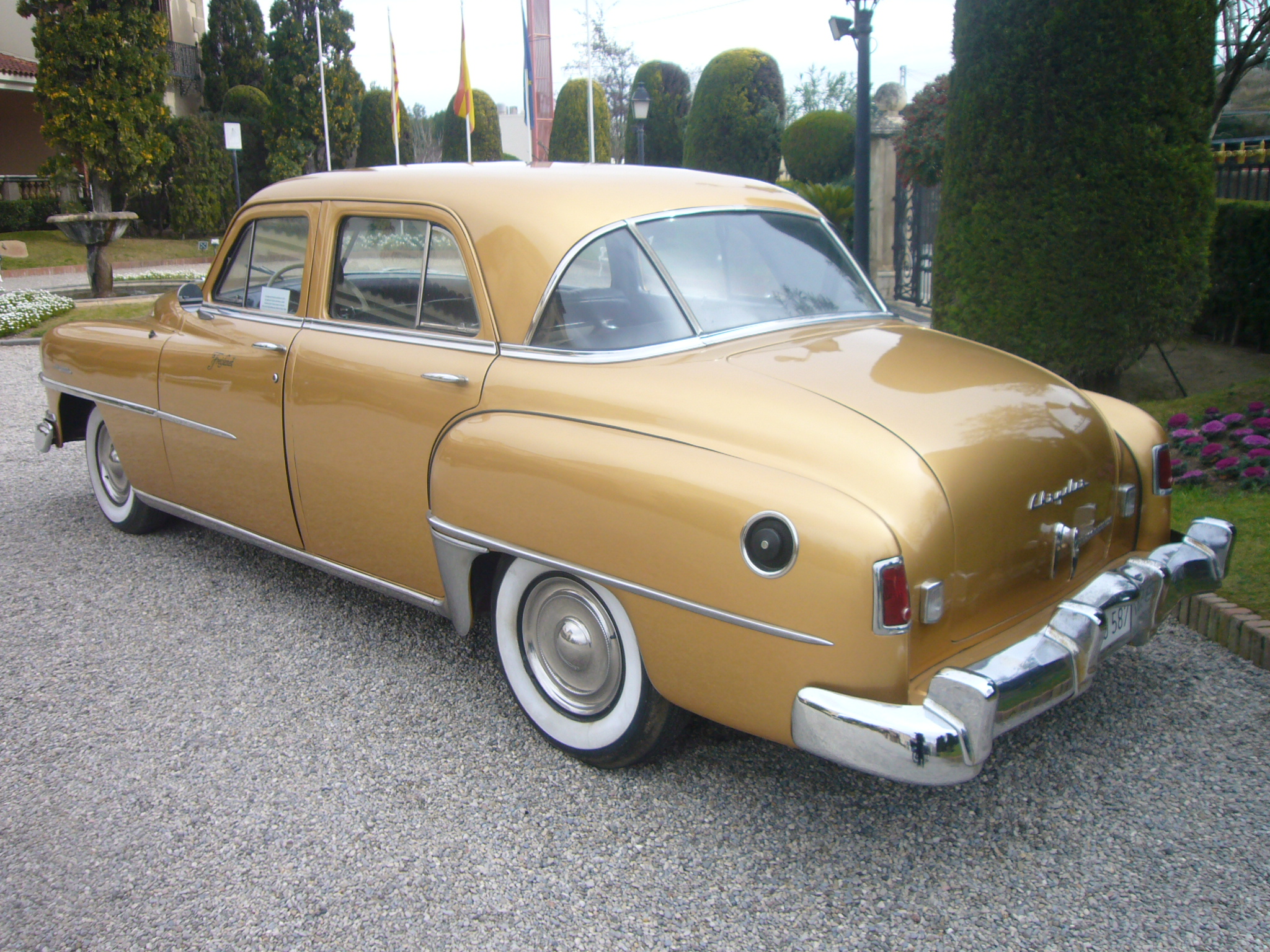
1951 Chrysler Windsor DeLuxe Six-Passenger Sedan (rear)

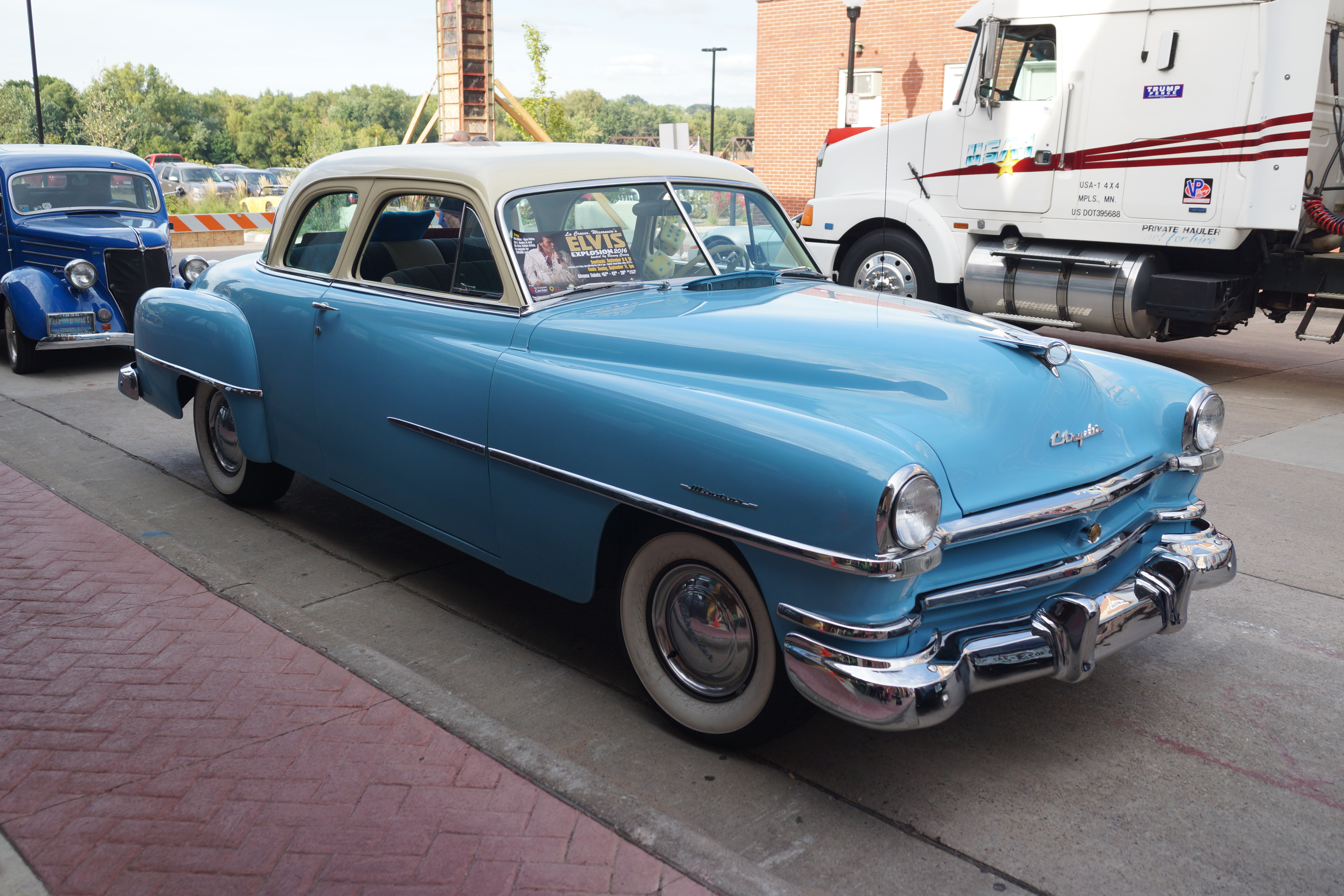
1952 Chrysler Windsor two-door Club Coupe

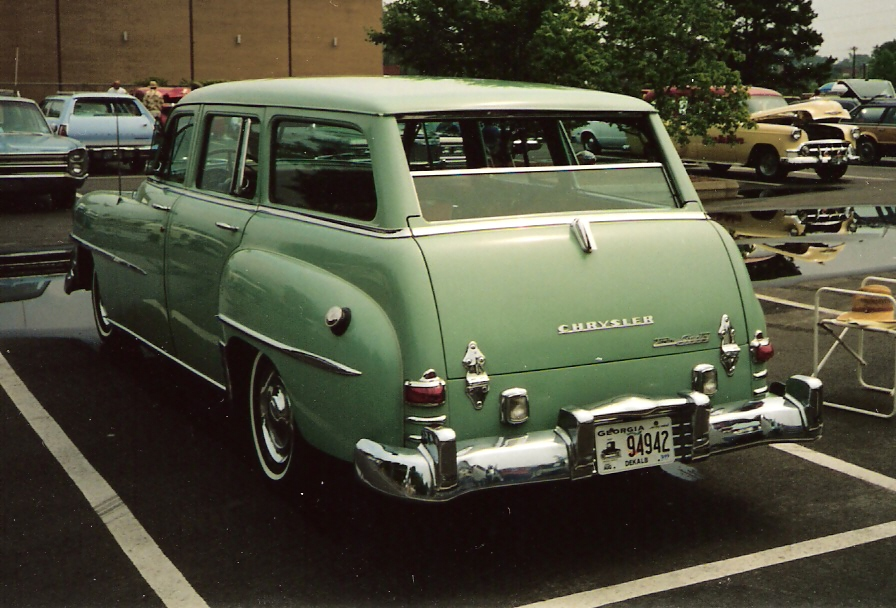
1952 Chrysler Windsor Town & Country Wagon

== 1953–1954 ==
Chrysler Windsor/Windsor DeLuxe
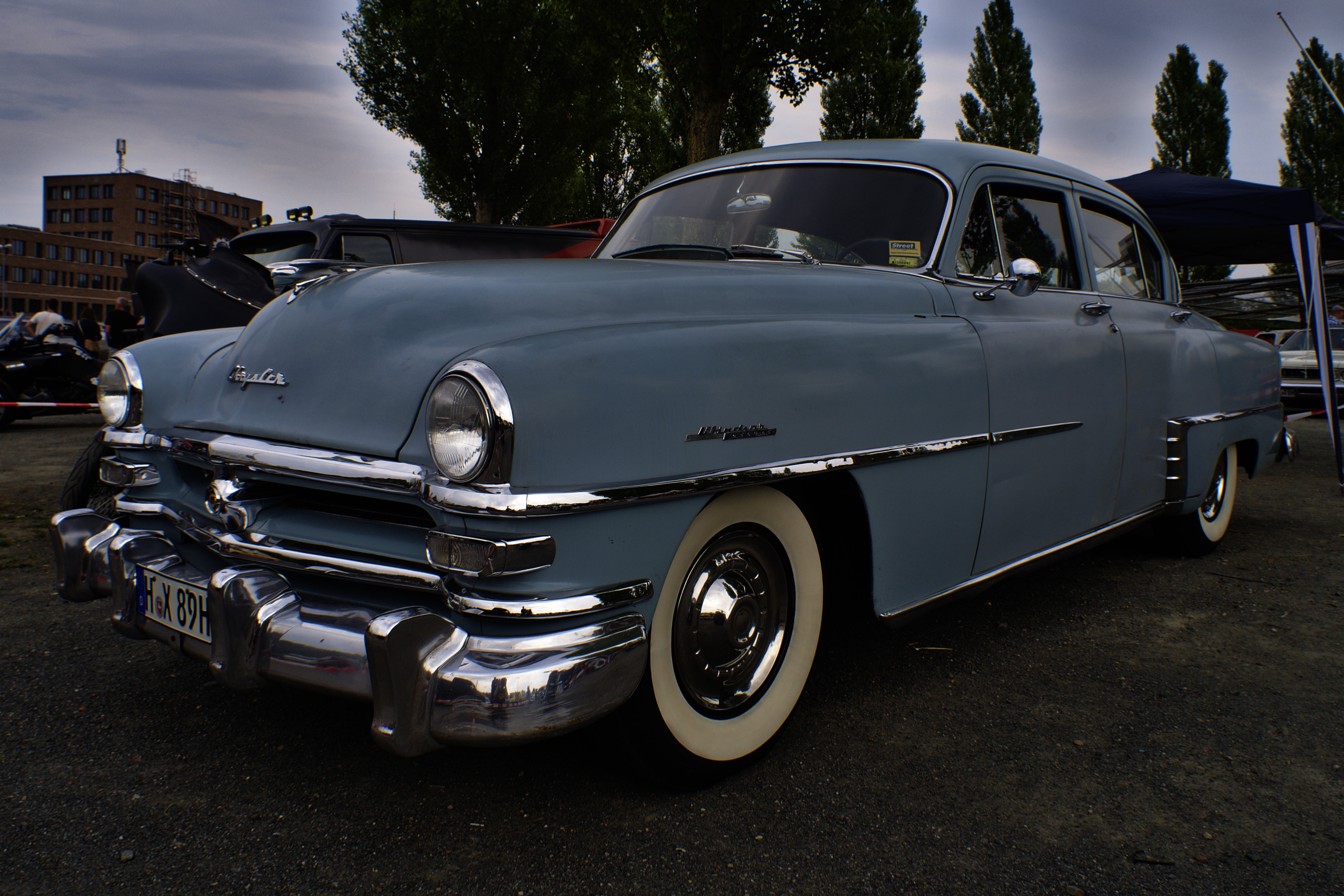
- 1953 Chrysler Windsor Deluxe 6 Passenger Sedan

Overview
- Manufacturer: Chrysler
- Production: 1953–1954

Body and chassis
- Body style: 2-door hardtop 2-door coupe 2-door convertible 4-door sedan 4-door station wagon (Town & Country)
- Layout: FR
- Related: Chrysler New Yorker; Chrysler Town & Country; DeSoto Powermaster

Powertrain
- Engine: 264.5 cu in (4.3 L) Chrysler I6
- Transmission: 3-speed manual PowerFlite automatic

Dimensions
- Wheelbase: 125.5 in (3,188 mm)
- Length: 211 in (5,359 mm) (1953) 215.6 in (5,476 mm) (1954); 222.3 in (5,646 mm) (8-passenger sedan 1953) 229.6 in (5,832 mm) (1954)
- Width: 76.8 in (1,951 mm)
- Height: 62.5 in (1,588 mm)

In 1953, the Chrysler Windsor (along with the rest of the Chrysler line) got new sheet metal and finally a one-piece curved windshield. Power steering was a $177 option.

For 1954, the base Windsor was dropped and all that was left was the Windsor DeLuxe. The grille and the instrument panel was new. A Popular Mechanics Survey of Chrysler owners reported that the best liked feature for Windsor owners was the comfortable ride (53%), followed by handling ease.

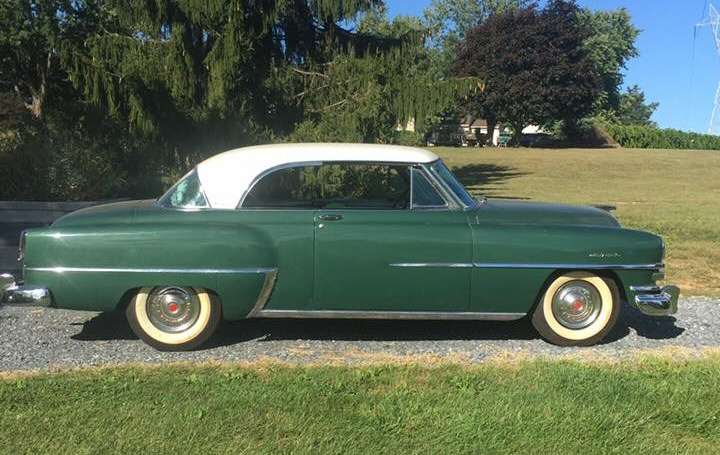
1953 Chrysler Windsor Deluxe Newport hardtop

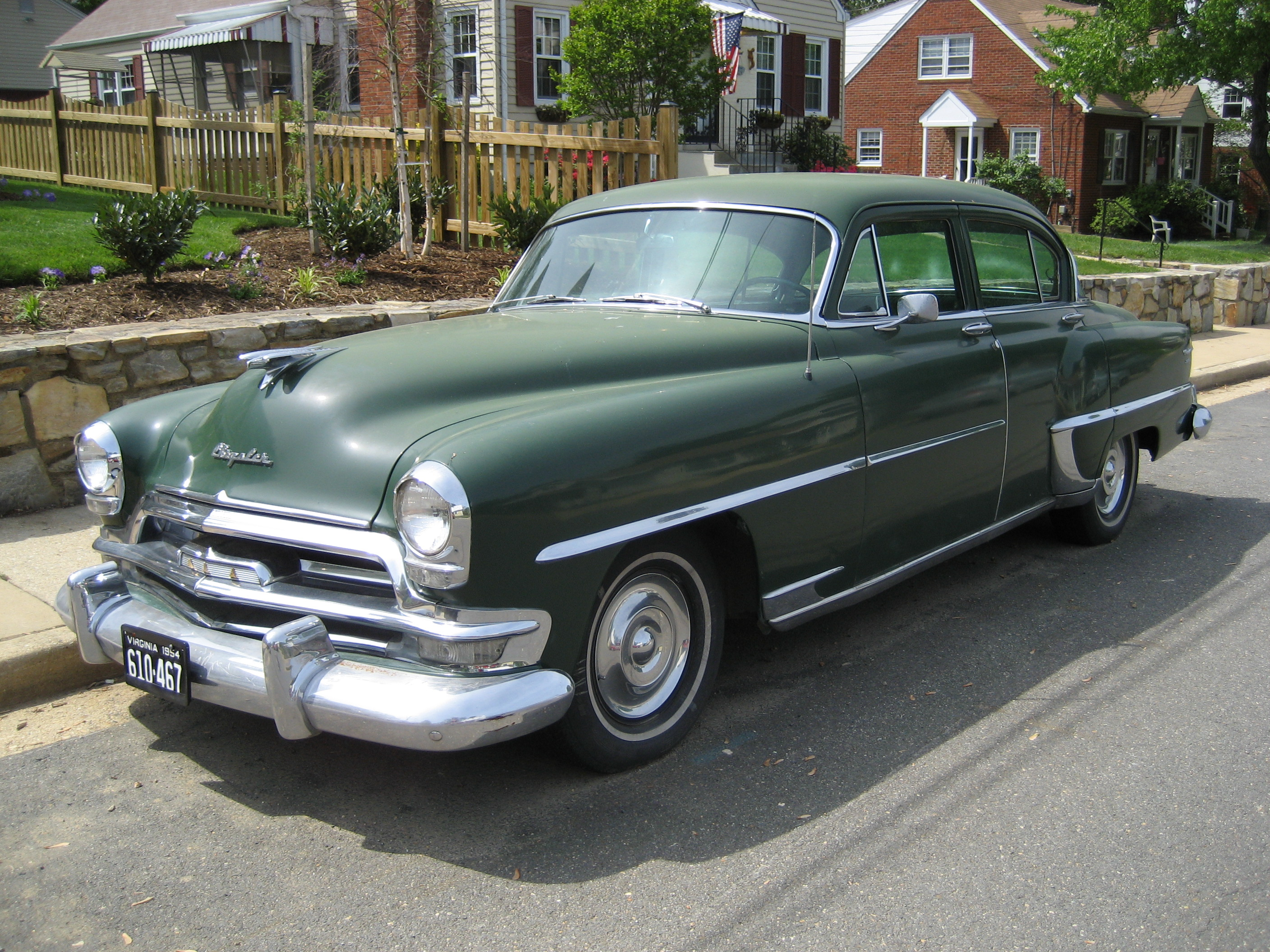
1954 Chrysler Windsor Deluxe 6 Passenger Sedan

== 1955–1956 ==
Chrysler Windsor
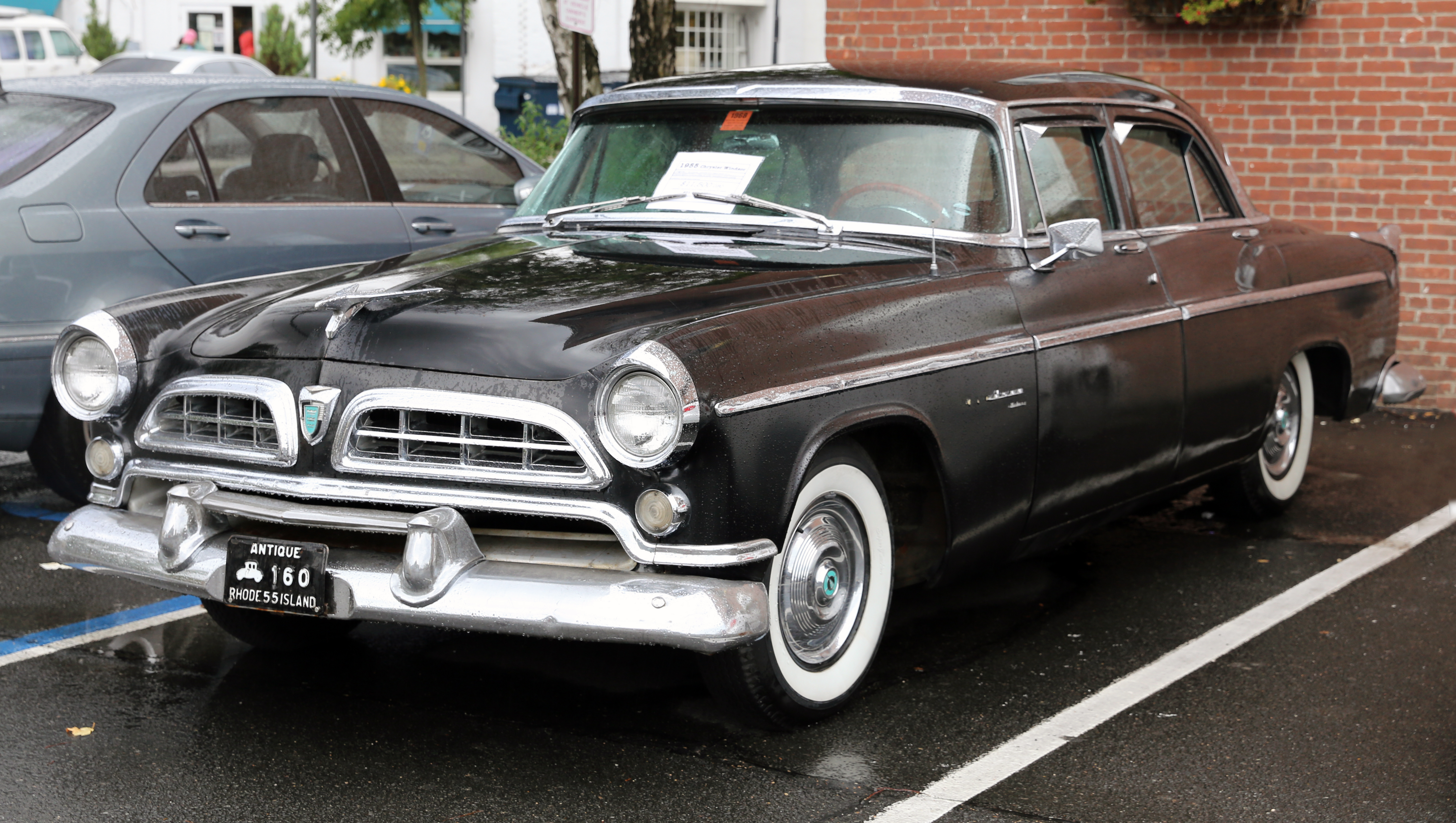
- 1955 Chrysler Windsor Deluxe

Overview
- Manufacturer: Chrysler
- Production: 1955–1956

Body and chassis
- Body style: 2-door hardtop 2-door convertible 4-door sedan 4-door hardtop 4-door station wagon (Town & Country)
- Layout: FR
- Related: Chrysler New Yorker; Chrysler Town & Country; Chrysler Saratoga; DeSoto Firedome; Dodge Coronet; Plymouth Belvedere

Powertrain
- Engine: 300.5 cu in (4.9 L) Poly V8(1955); 331 cu in (5.4 L) Poly V8
- Transmission: 3-speed manual PowerFlite automatic

Dimensions
- Wheelbase: 126 in (3,200 mm)
- Length: 218.6 in (5,552 mm) (1955); 220.4 in (5,598 mm)(1956)
- Width: 79.0 in (2,007 mm) (1955); 78.8 in (2,002 mm)(1956)
- Height: 60.6 in (1,539 mm)

In 1955, all Chrysler cars were completely restyled with styling by Virgil Exner, sharing some visual similarities with the all-new Imperial which became its own division. The tradition of adding the Newport as a suffix to the model name continued and a four-door hardtop was added.

The styling of the Windsor was more rounded and featured wrap around windshields. The word DeLuxe was added to Windsor again. Front head room was 35 inches (890 mm). Rear axle ratio for the 3-speed manual was 3.73. The Windsor made up 64.72% of Chrysler's sales.

For 1956, the "Forward Look" restyling came out, introducing the first tail fins on a Chrysler car. Interior trims remained mostly the same, though a new Highway Hi-Fi phonograph player was a new option on the Windsor.

The 1956 edition for the Canadian market featured the Plymouth 303 Poly V-8 Engine, the same one used in the Plymouth Fury and the Canadian Dodge Custom Royal.

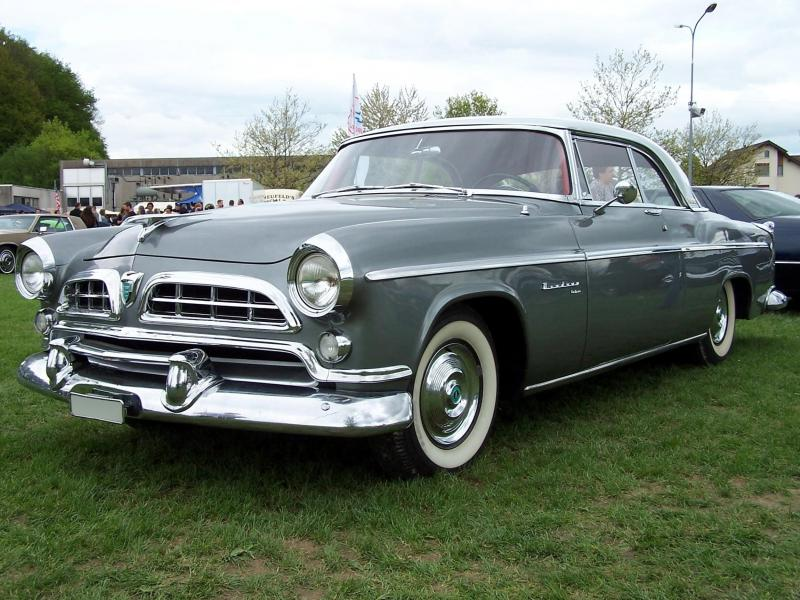
1955 Chrysler Windsor De Luxe Newport

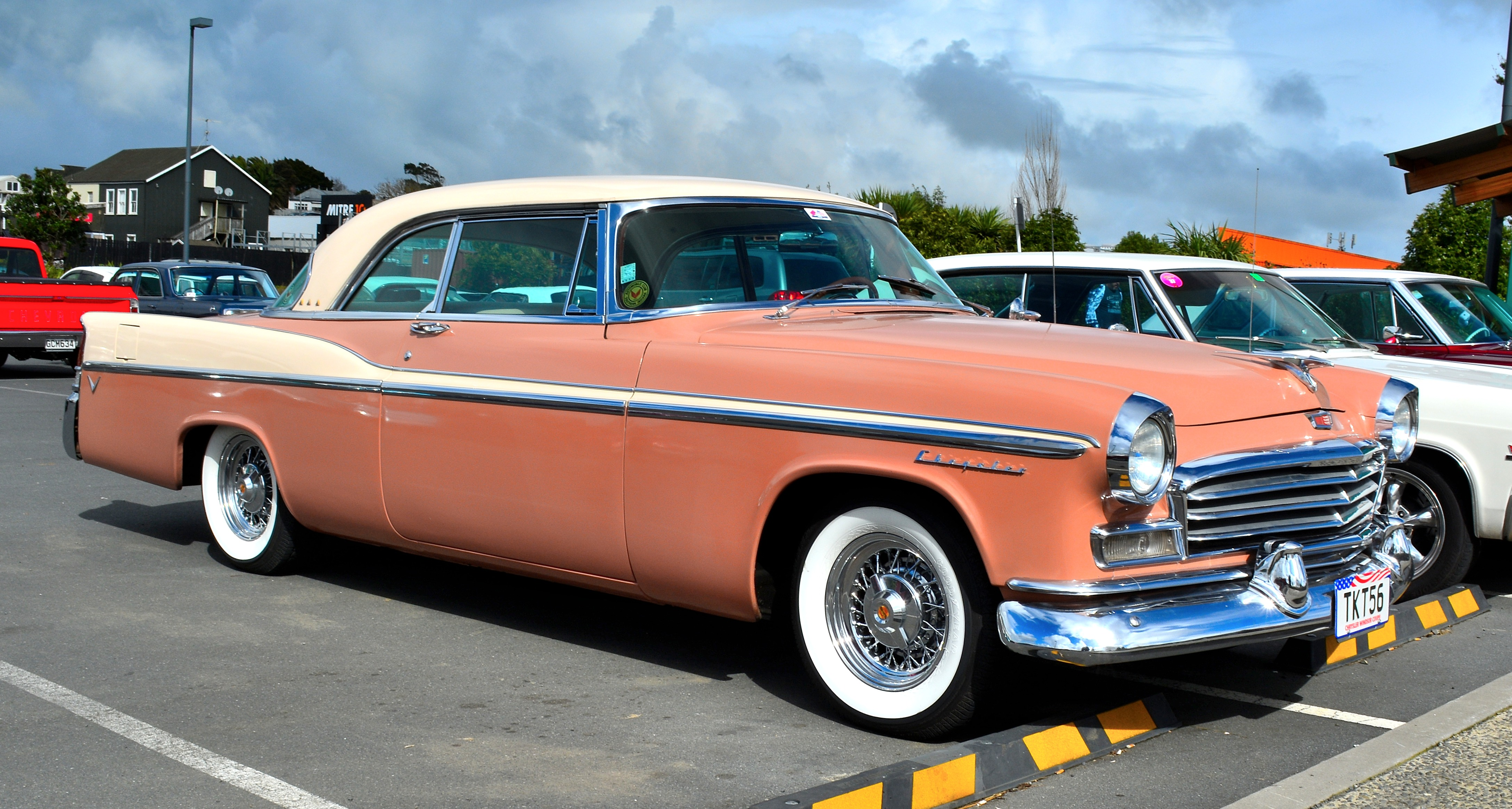
1956 Chrysler Windsor 2-door hardtop

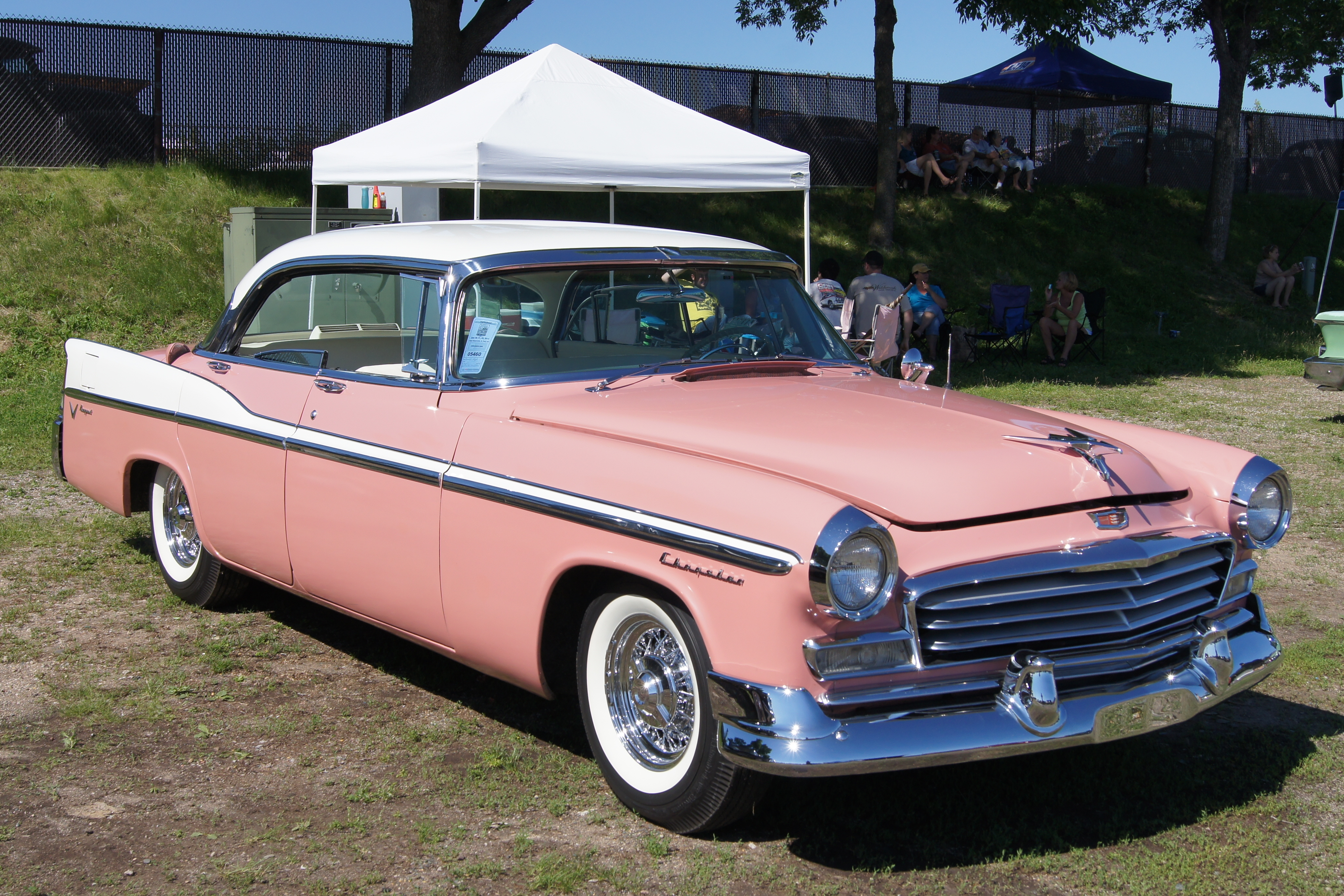
1956 Chrysler Windsor Newport 4-door hardtop

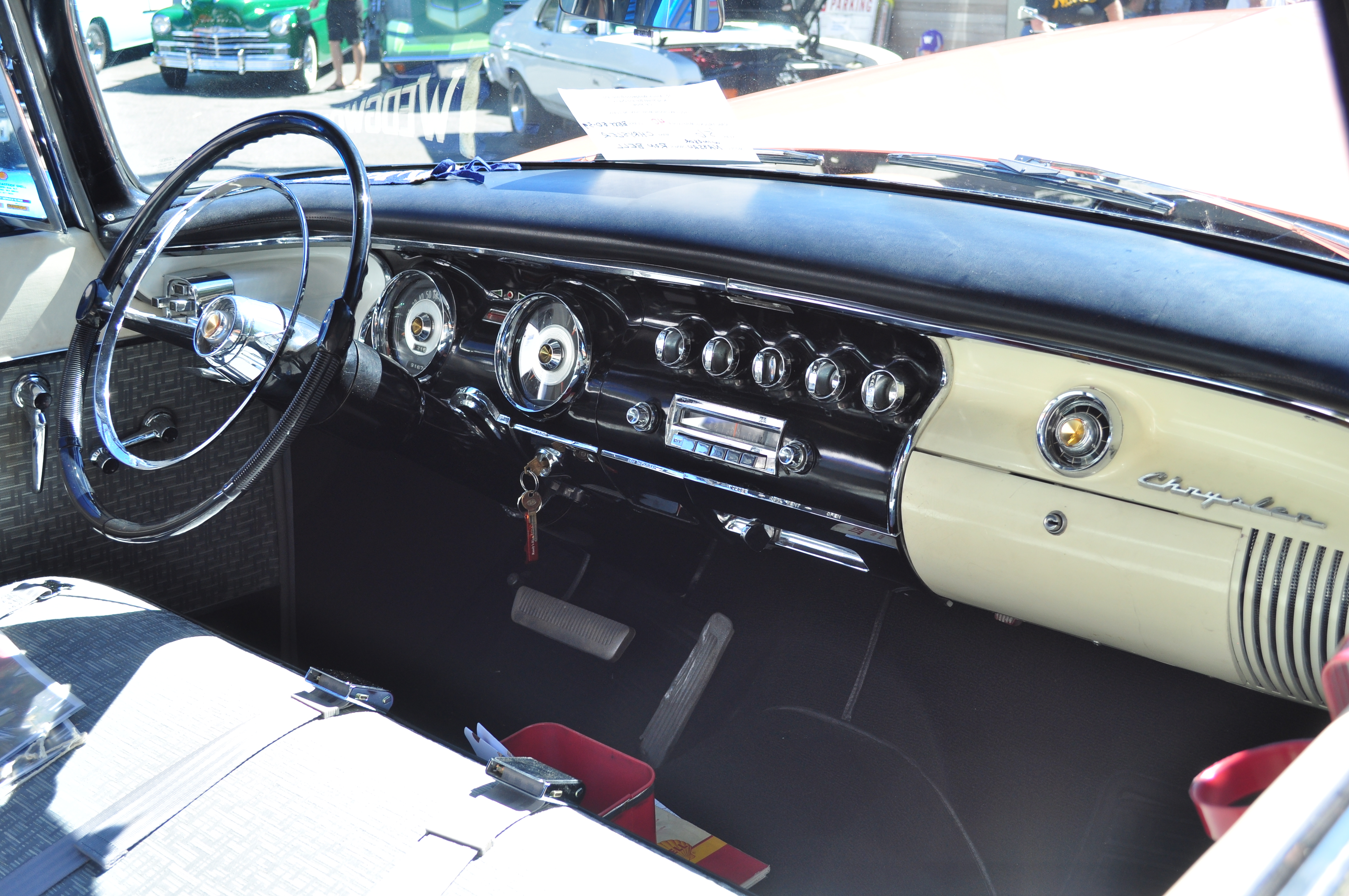
1956 Chrysler Windsor Nassau interior

== 1957–1958 ==
Chrysler Windsor
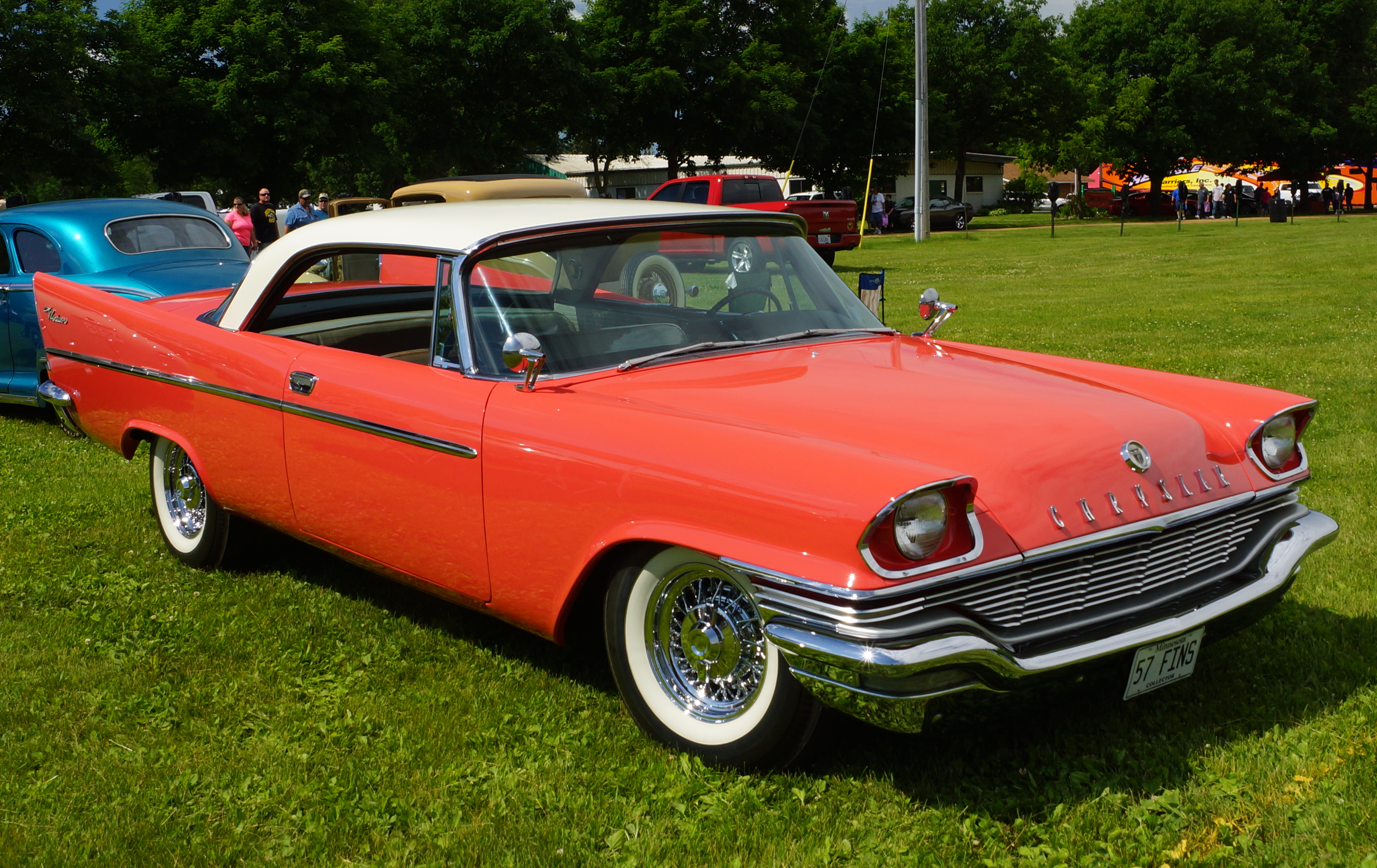
- 1957 Chrysler Windsor 2-door Hardtop

Overview
- Manufacturer: Chrysler
- Production: 1957–1958

Body and chassis
- Body style: 2-door hardtop 2-door convertible 4-door sedan 4-door hardtop 4-door station wagon (Town & Country)
- Layout: FR
- Related: Chrysler Town & Country; Chrysler Saratoga; DeSoto Firesweep; Dodge Coronet; Plymouth Belvedere

Powertrain
- Engine: 354 cu in (5.8 L) Spitfire V8
- Transmission: 3-speed manual TorqueFlite Automatic

Dimensions
- Wheelbase: 126 in (3,200 mm) (1957); 122 in (3,099 mm) (1958)
- Length: 219.2 in (5,568 mm) (1957); 218 in (5,537 mm) (1958)
- Width: 78.8 in (2,002 mm)

For 1957, Chrysler cars, including the Windsor, were restyled again. This time with taller tailfins with vertical taillights, thinner C-pillars, and a wraparound front bumper. Mid-year, dual headlights became standard. Front head room grew to 35.7 inches. Safety equipment was optional on the Windsor. Unfortunately for Chrysler, 1957 cars were plagued with quality problems, such as breaking torsion bar suspensions and rust. 1957 Chrysler cars were redesigned with Virgil Exner's "Forward Look" at the cost of $300 million ($3,438,981,043 in 2025 dollars) when Chrysler took on a loan in 1954 from Prudential Insurance to pay for expansion and updated car designs.

In 1958, the Windsor (LC1-L) was moved to the Dodge/DeSoto Firesweep 122-inch (3,100 mm) chassis. Canadian Windsors still used the longer, 126-inch (3,200 mm) chassis and was essentially a rebadged Saratoga (LC2-M), a model which was not sold in Canada this year. New this year for all Chrysler cars was the new "Auto-Pilot" cruise control system. It had two features. One was the speed-warning feature that the driver would turn the knob to set a certain speed. Then, when the driver would start to pass the speed, pressure would be felt in the pedal, letting the driver know that they were going too fast. The other feature was the actual cruise control. It was activated by pressing on the speed-set knob. The Windsor made up 42.36% of Chrysler's sales in 1958.

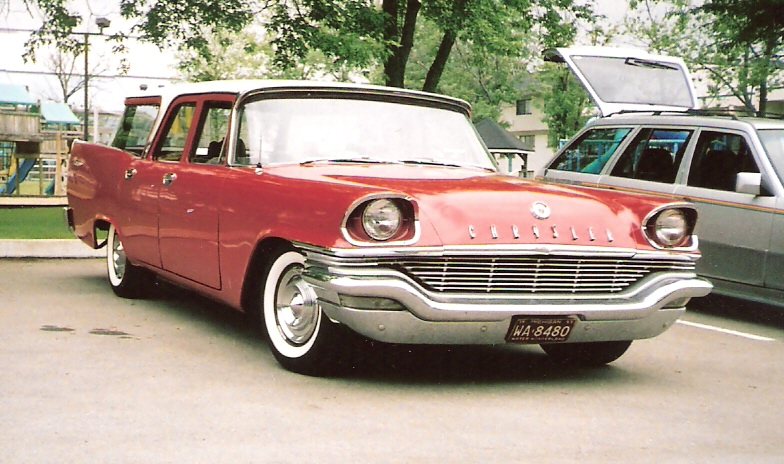
1957 Chrysler Windsor Town & Country Wagon

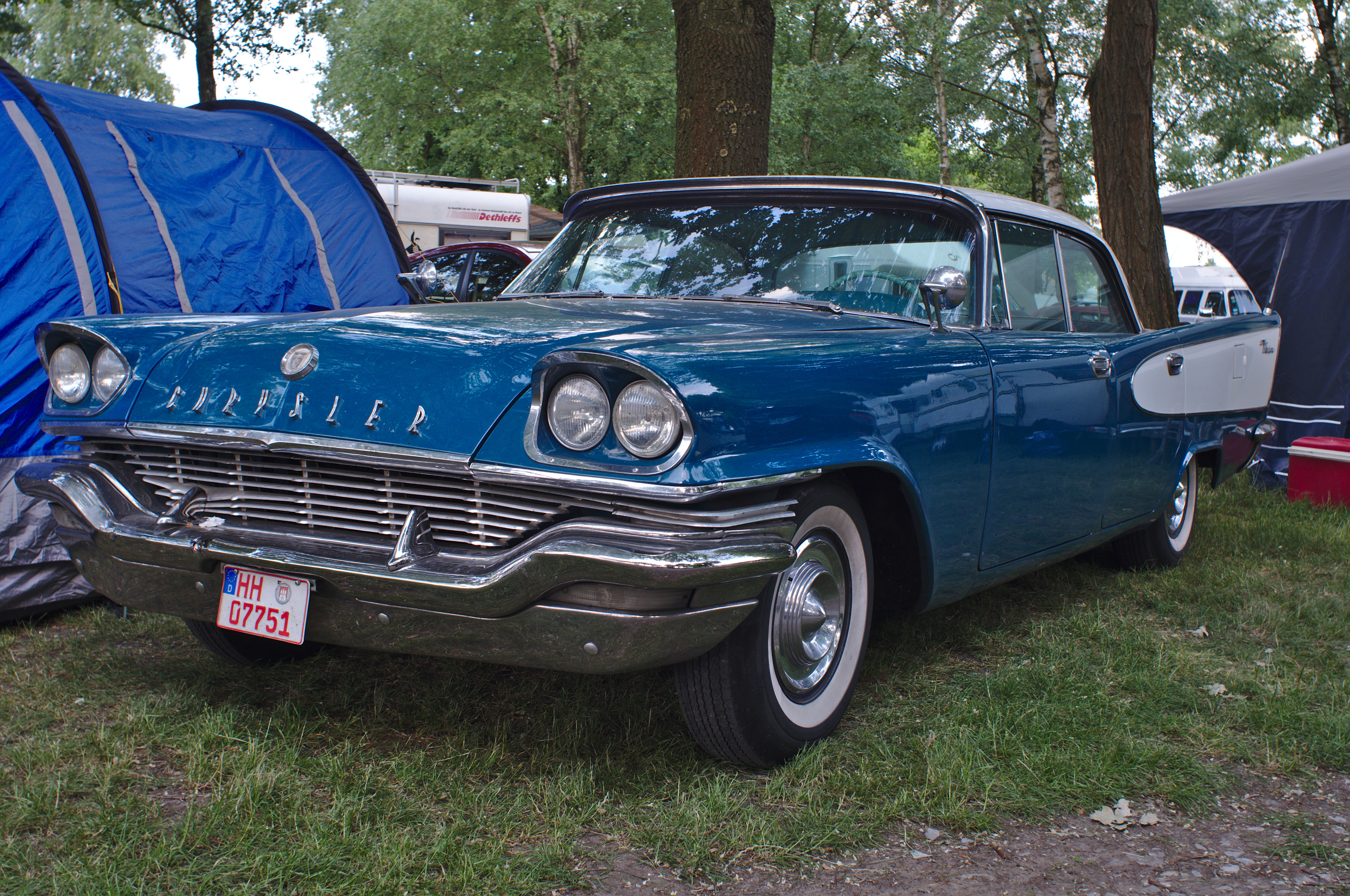
1957 Chrysler Windsor Newport 4-Door Hardtop. Dual headlight were initially an option for 1957, but became standard equipment soon after production commenced.

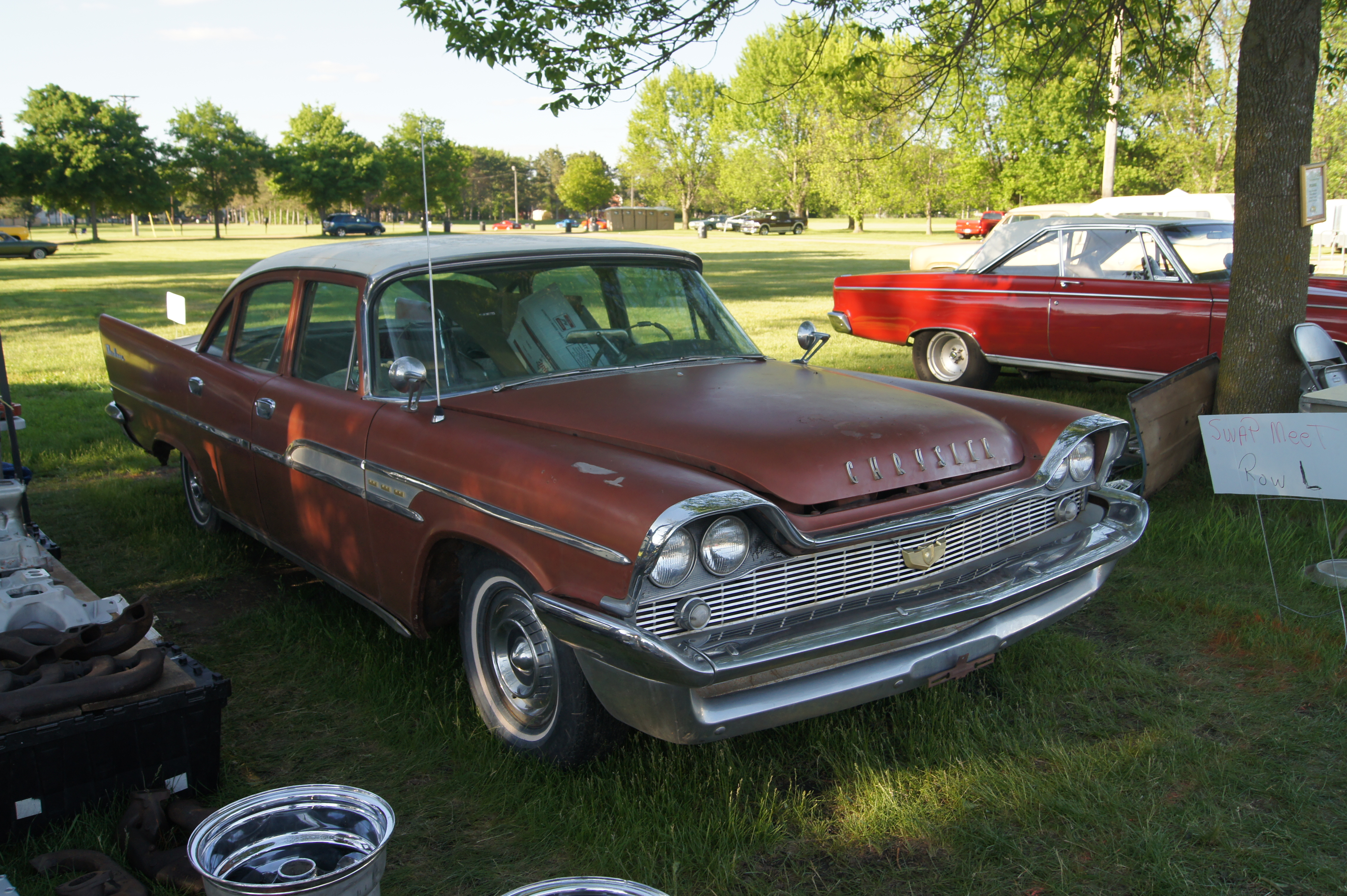
1958 Chrysler Windsor four-door sedan (US)

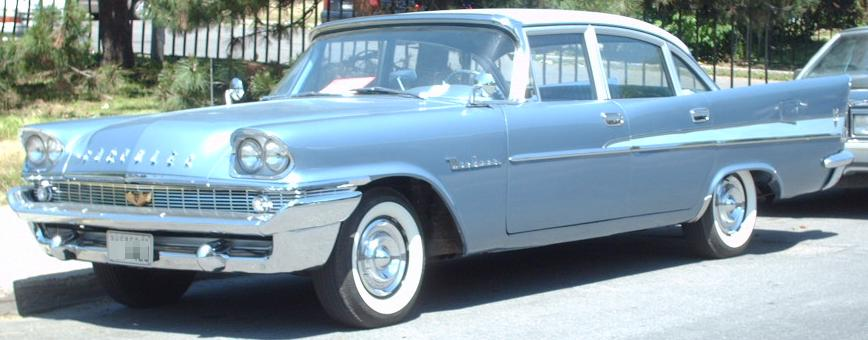
1958 Chrysler Windsor Sedan (Canadian)

== 1959–1961 ==
Chrysler Windsor
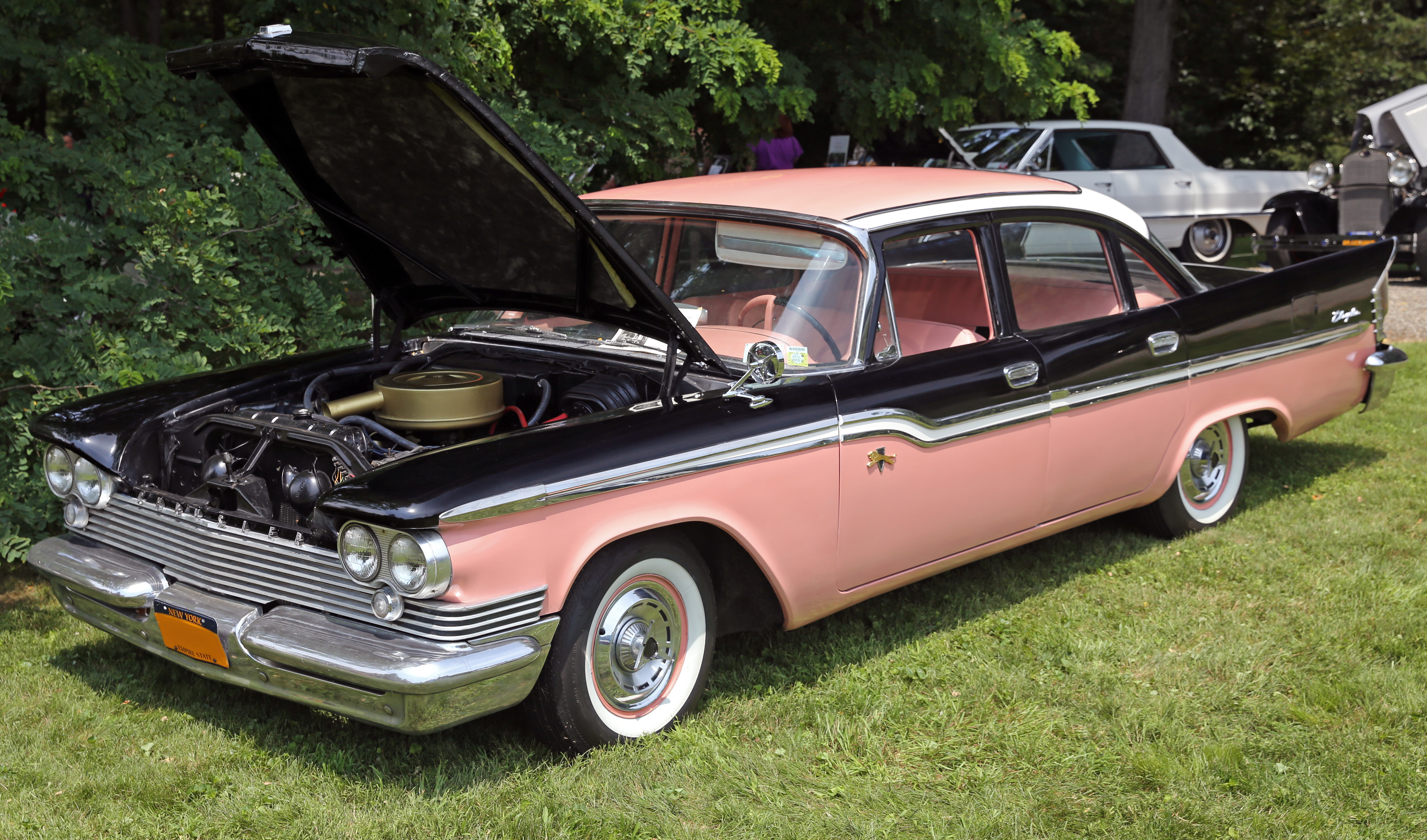
- 1959 Chrysler Windsor 4-Door Sedan

Overview
- Manufacturer: Chrysler
- Production: 1959–1961

Body and chassis
- Body style: 2-door hardtop 2-door convertible 4-door sedan 4-door hardtop 4-door station wagon (Town & Country)
- Layout: FR
- Related: Chrysler Town & Country; DeSoto (1961)

Powertrain
- Engine: 383 cu in (6.3 L) Wedge V8
- Transmission: TorqueFlite 3-speed automatic

Dimensions
- Wheelbase: 122 in (3,099 mm)
- Length: 215.4 in (5,471 mm)
- Width: 79.4 in (2,017 mm)

In 1959, Chrysler started to advertise the car's new Wedge-head V8 "B" engines as "Golden Lions" and the cars as "Lion Hearted". The RB 383 produces 305 hp (227 kW) with a twin-barrel carburetor. Lions were used in the advertising, and the cars had lion emblems on the front doors and on the cylinder heads. Air conditioning was a US$510 option ($5,633 in 2025 dollars). Starting in 1958, Chryslers were optionally equipped with Captive-Aire tires that remained inflated regardless of a tire puncture for $94 ($1,023 in 2025 dollars).

Canadian-built cars did not get the new RB 383 engine, but were equipped with the "Low Block" 361 cu in (5.9 L) engine as used in US Dodges and DeSotos. Thus, Canadian Windsors also did not get the "Golden Lion" decorations; instead, they were fitted with three golden crests on the front doors. The B 361 engine produces 295 hp (220 kW) with a twin carburetor. As convertibles and station wagons were imported from the US, they did not receive differing specifications. Brochures for the 1959 US Chryslers actually show this triple crest being mounted on the front door, with the Golden Lion appearing on the rear fenders instead, but this is not how the finished product appeared.

In 1960, all Chrysler cars got a unibody frame. A new parking brake was also used, and the brakes on the Windsor were 11" drums. The Windsor shared a futuristic semi-circular domed instrument cluster Chrysler called the AstraDome, which housed the speedometer and all gauges in one location with the Chrysler 300, Newport, Saratoga and New Yorker. The clusters appearance was compared to a gum ball machine, and the gauges at night could be viewed with electroluminescent lighting Chrysler called "Panelescent Light", a feature shared with all Chrysler and Imperial vehicles starting in 1960.

In 1961, all Chrysler cars were redesigned. On the Windsor, standard equipment included a cigarette lighter, map lights, and new for 1961, a safety padded dash. 1961 was the last year of the Windsor in the United States.

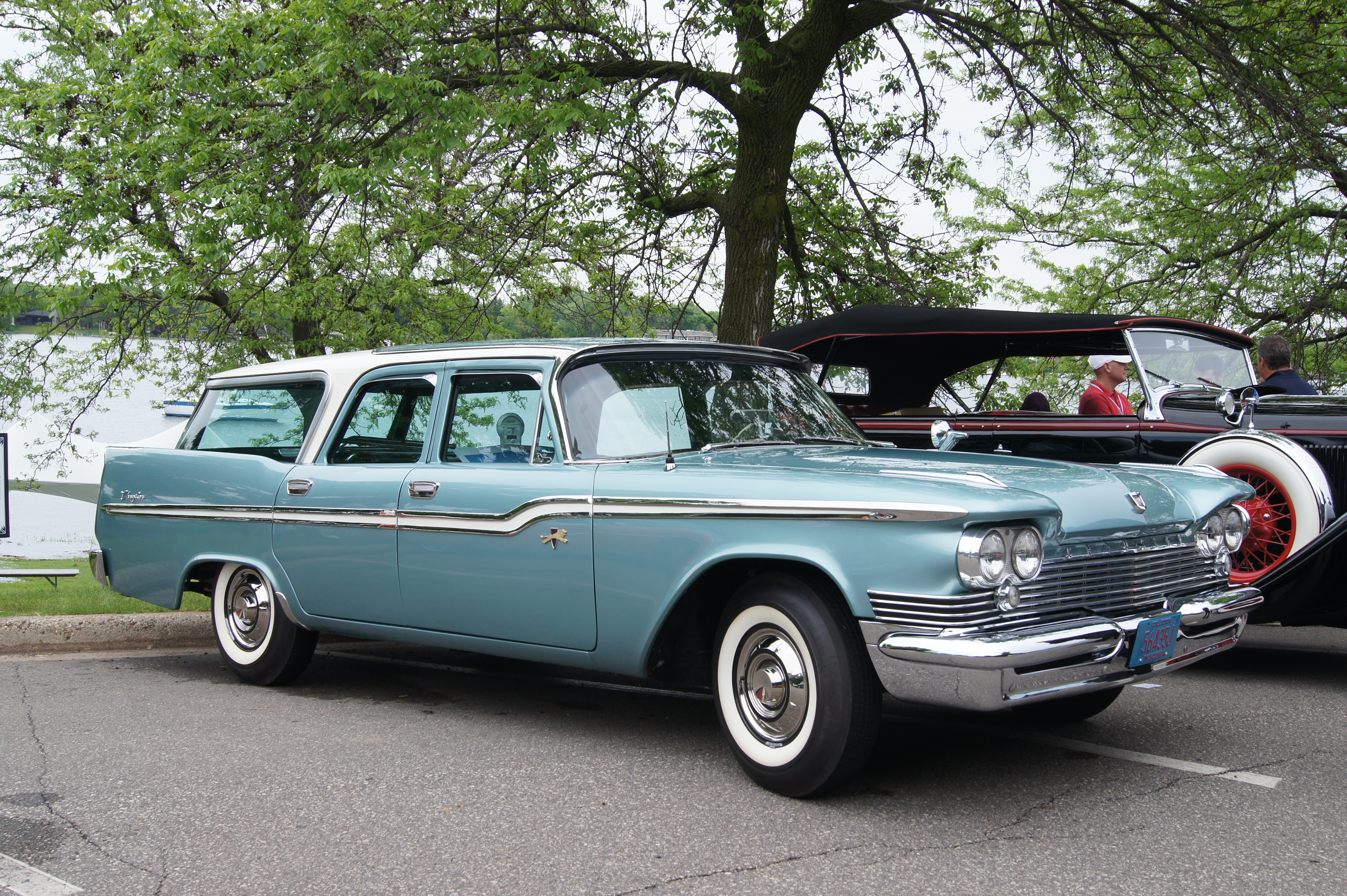
1959 Chrysler Windsor Town & Country

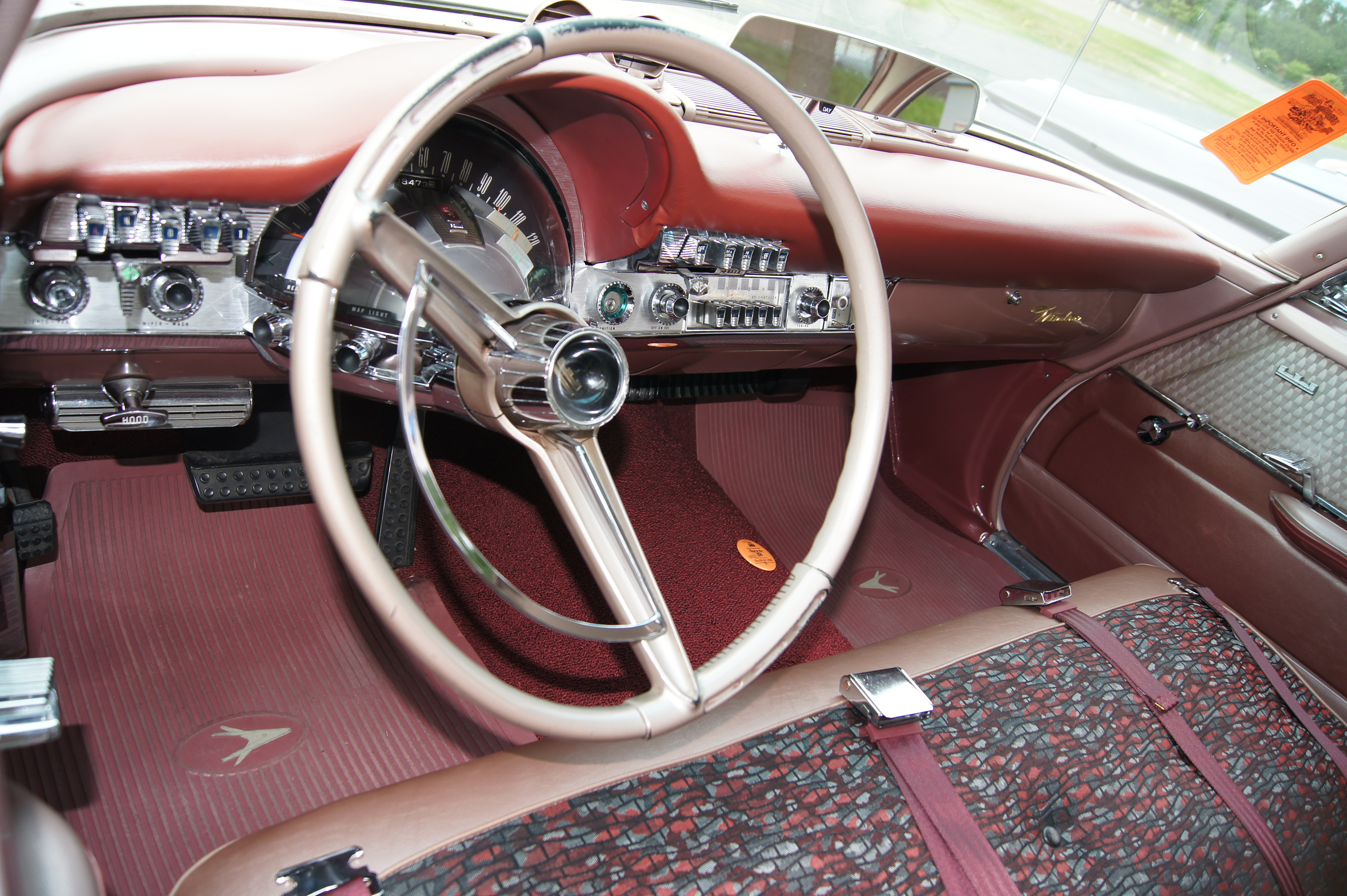
AstraDome Instrument Cluster (starting 1960)

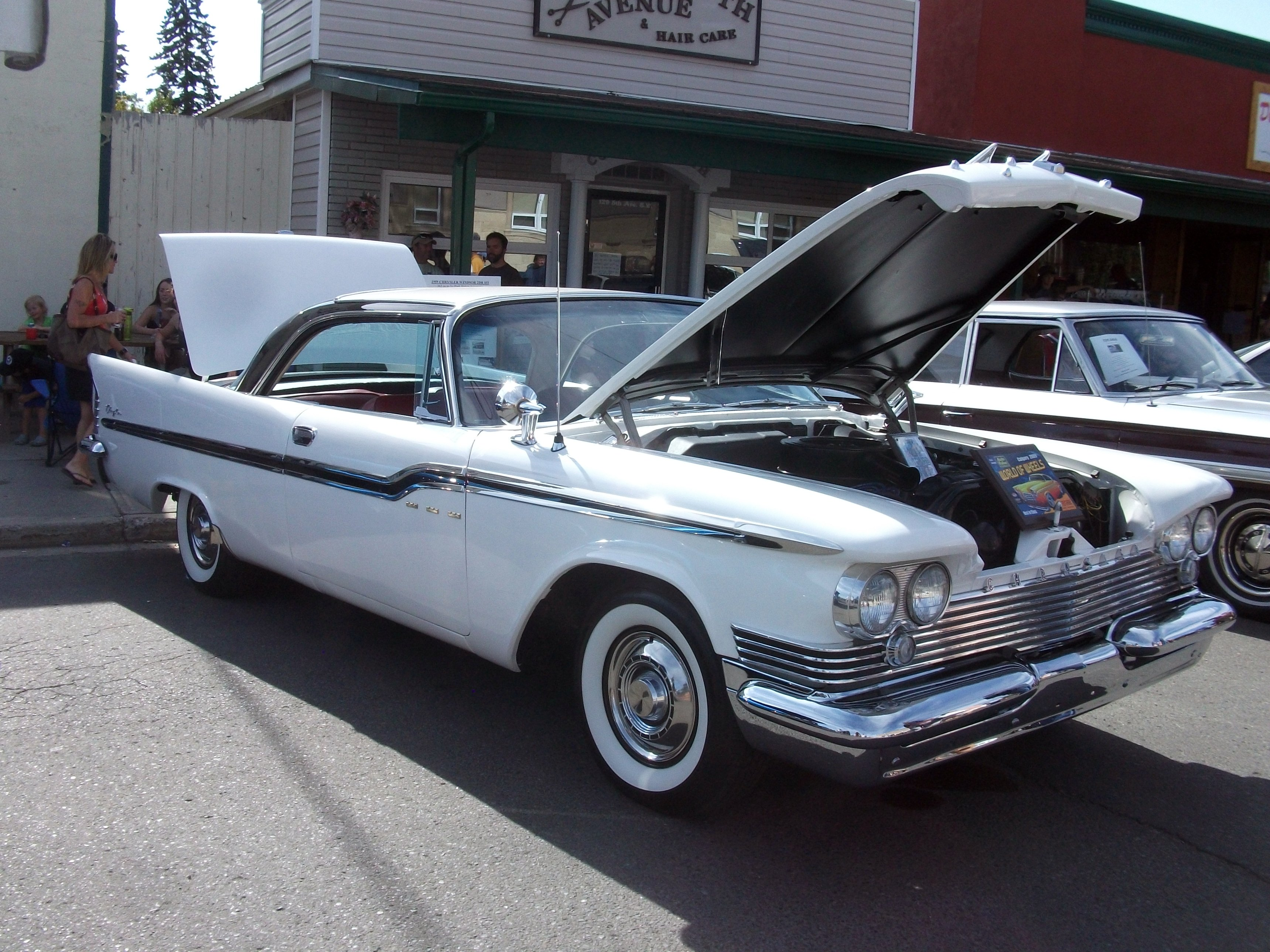
Canadian market 1959 Chrysler Windsor Newport 2-Door Hardtop. Note triple crests rather than Golden Lion badging on the front doors.

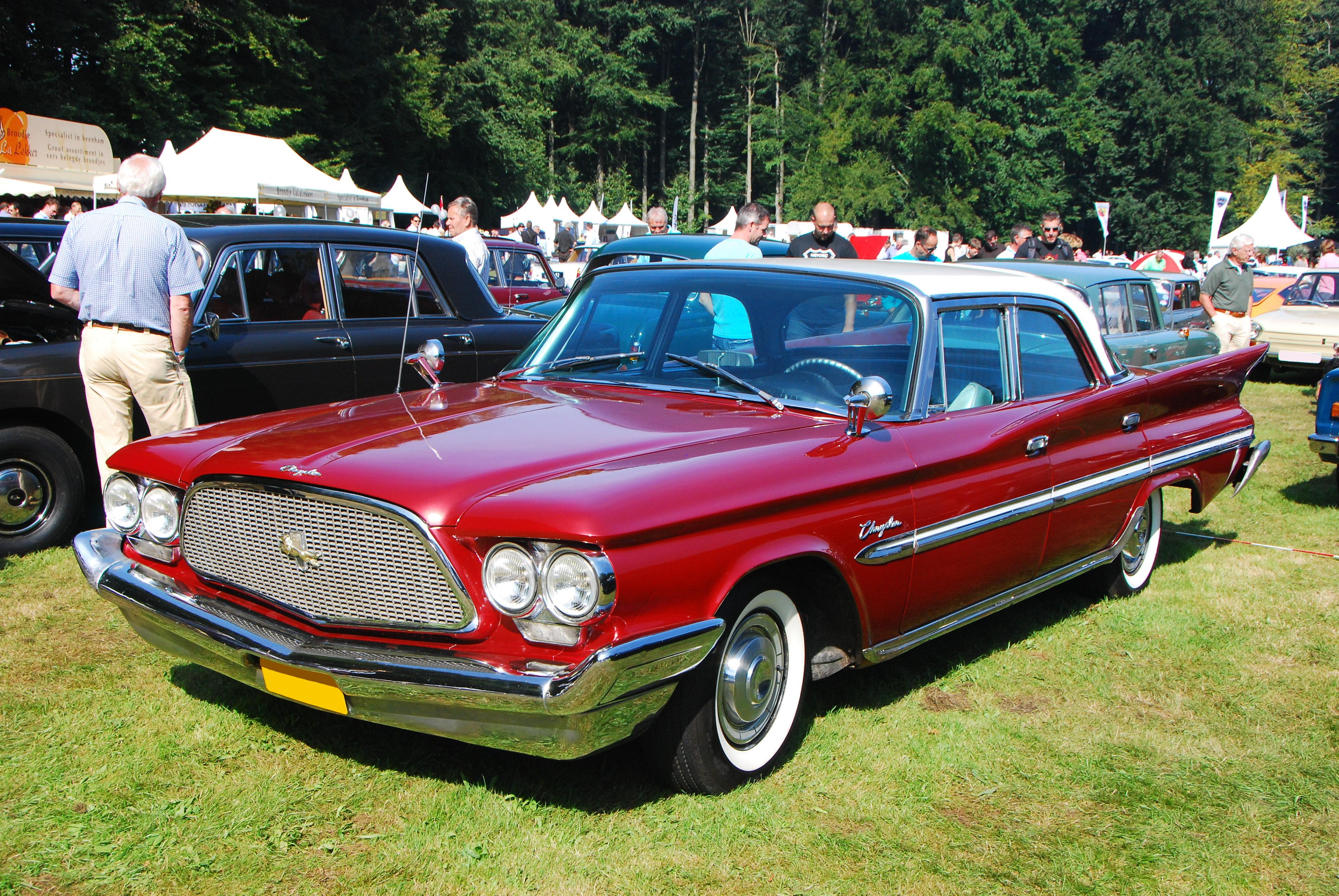
1960 Chrysler Windsor 4-Door Sedan

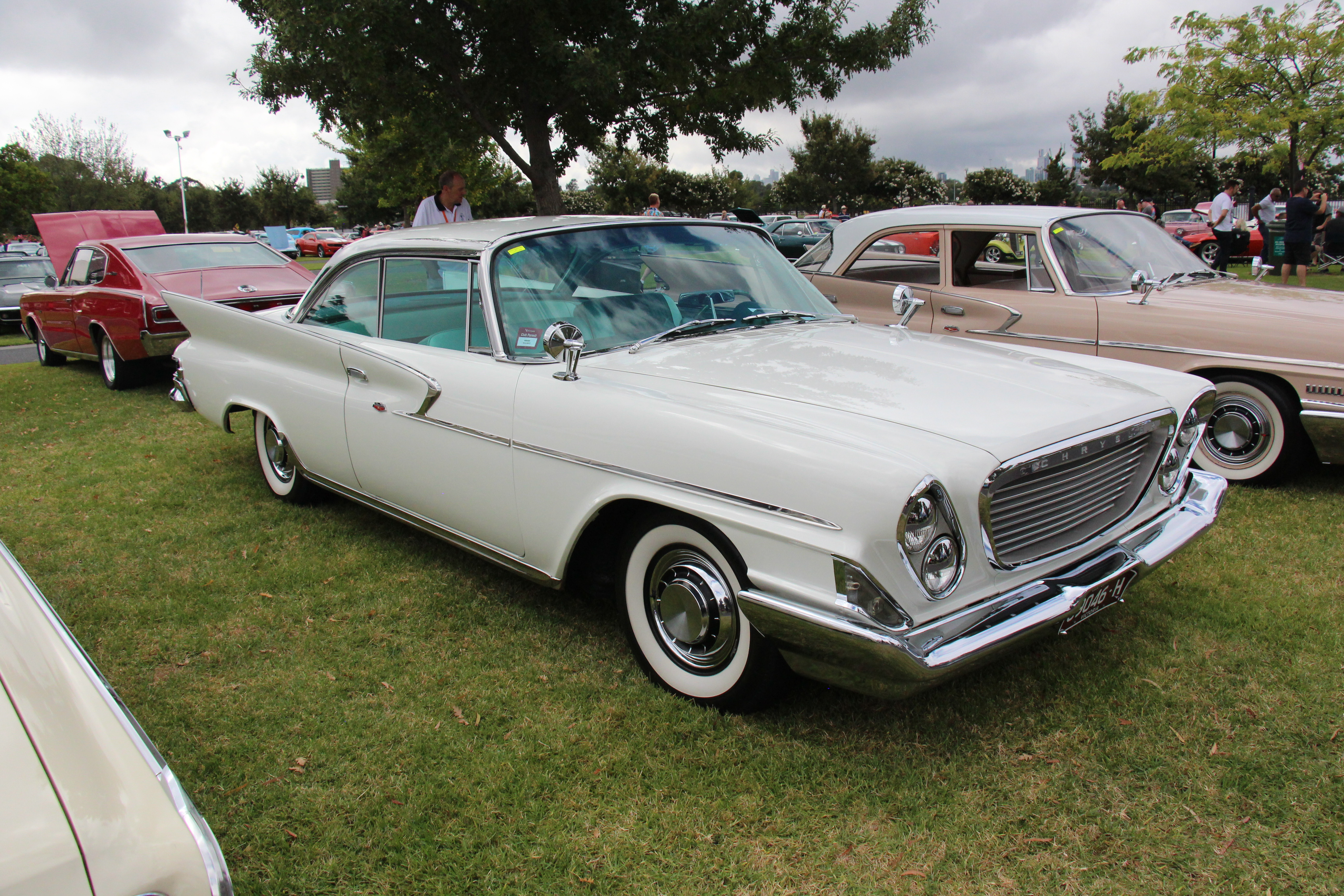
1961 Chrysler Windsor 2-door hardtop

== Canadian models (1961–1966) ==
Production of a Chrysler Windsor model continued in Canada up to and including the 1966 model year.

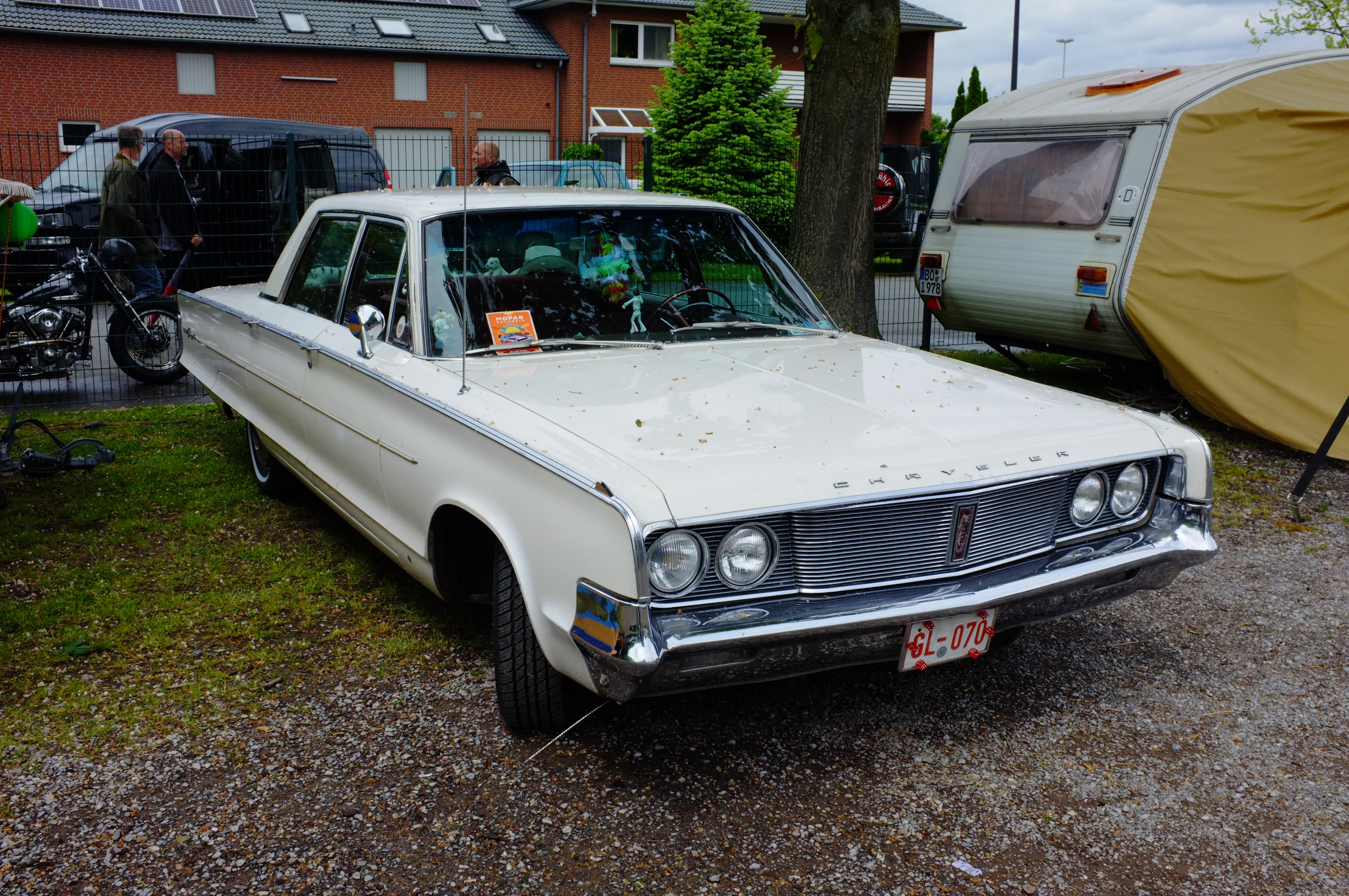
1965 Chrysler Windsor 4-Door Sedan (Canada)

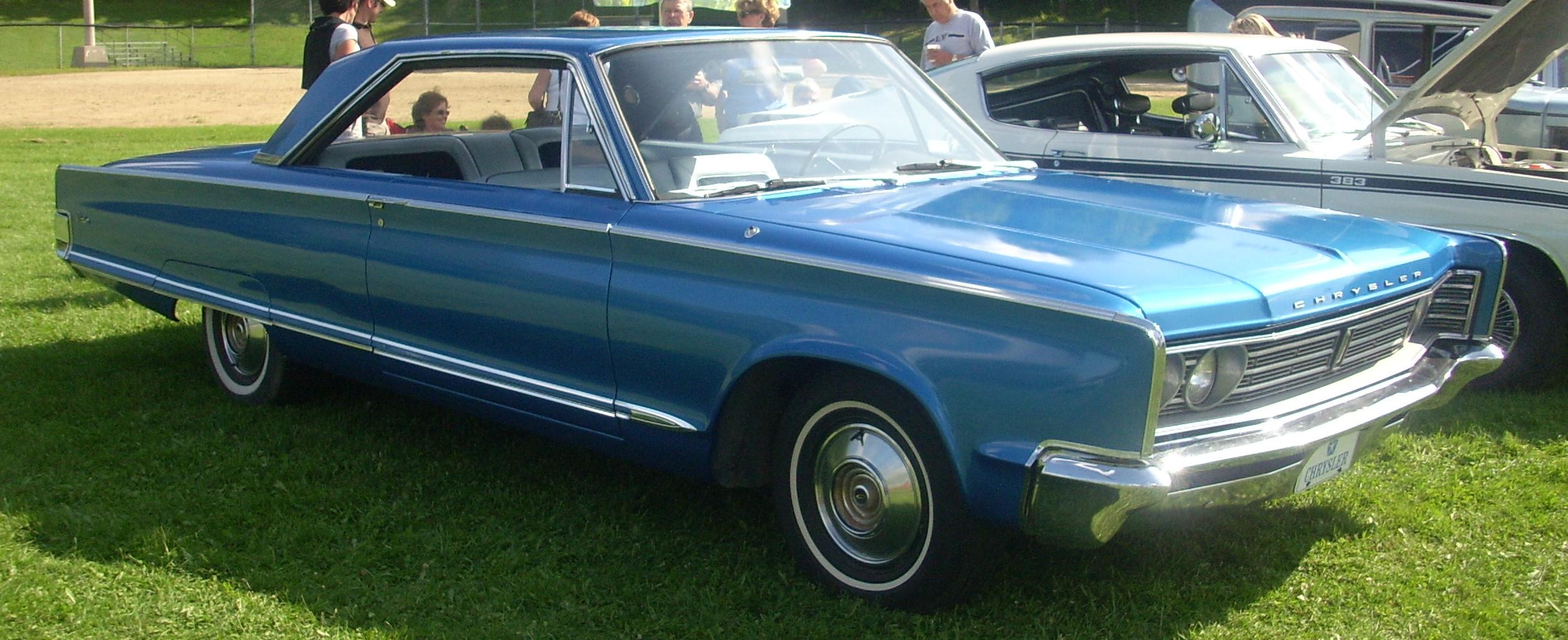
1966 Chrysler Windsor 2-Door Hardtop (Canada)
