= 1949 Plymouth =

Range of full-size cars

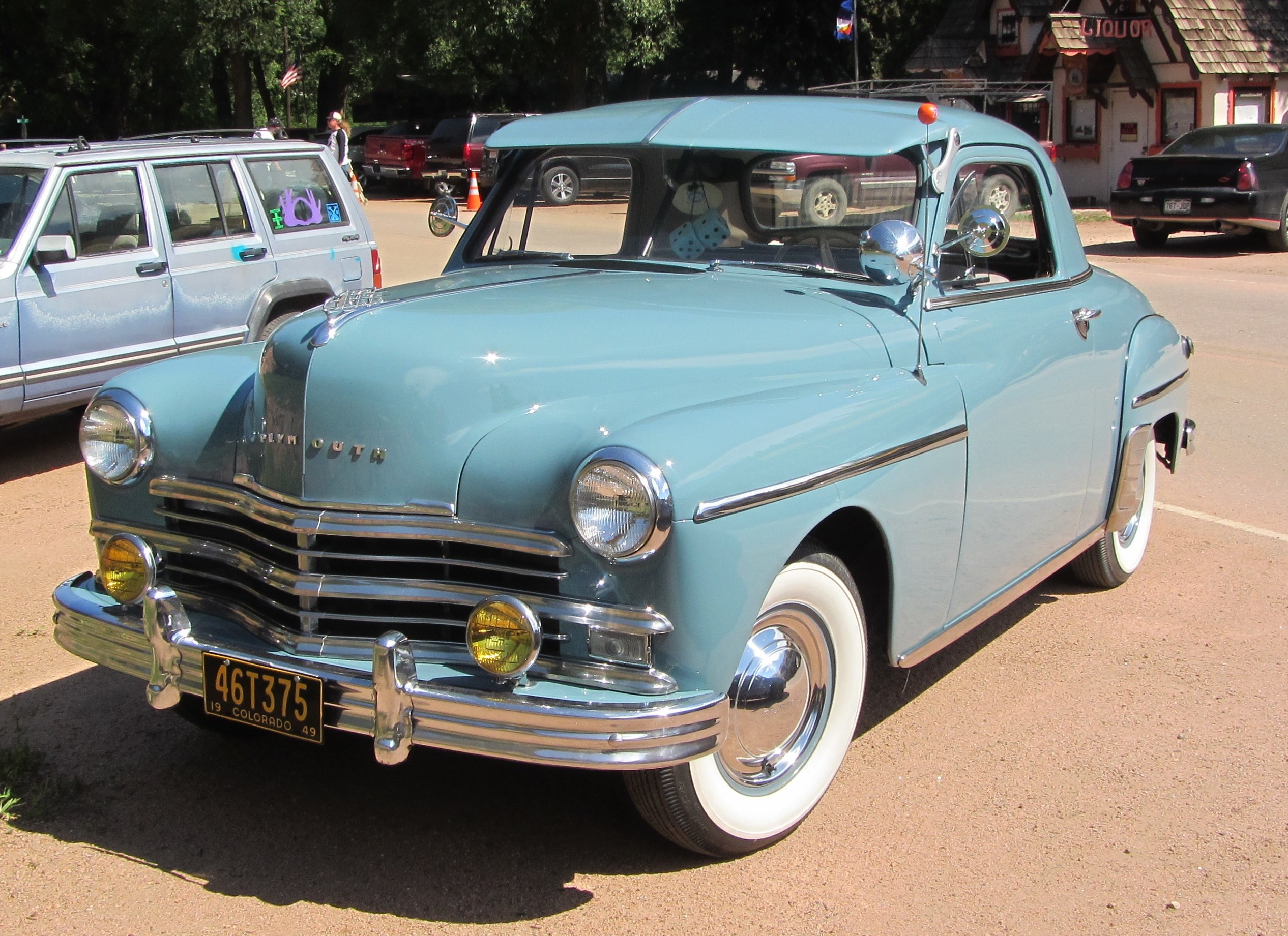
- Plymouth DeLuxe coupe from 1949

Overview
- Manufacturer: Plymouth
- Production: 1949–1952
- Assembly: (United States) Detroit (United States) Los Angeles (United States) Evansville (United States) San Leandro (Canada) Windsor (Australia) Adelaide

Body and chassis
- Body style: 2- and 4-door sedan 3- and 5-door station wagon 2-door coupe 2-door convertible

Powertrain
- Engine: straight-six engine: 3.6 L, 97 hp
- Transmission: 3-speed manual
- Hybrid drivetrain: rear-wheel drive, front longitudinal engine

Dimensions
- Wheelbase: 2,819 mm (111.0 in) or 3,010 mm (119 in)
- Length: 1949: 4,707–4,864 mm (185.3–191.5 in); 1951: 4,780–4,922 mm (188.2–193.8 in)
- Width: 1949: 1,816 mm (71.5 in); 1951: 1,849 mm (72.8 in)
- Height: 1949: 1,631–1,666 mm (64.2–65.6 in); 1951: 1,595–1,636 mm (62.8–64.4 in)

The 1949 Plymouth was a range of full-size cars in the lower price segment, produced under the American brands Plymouth, Dodge, and DeSoto by the Chrysler Corporation from 1949 to 1952. For the U.S. market, the range included the Plymouth De Luxe and Special De Luxe models, and from 1951, the Plymouth Concord, Cambridge, and Cranbrook. For export, these cars were produced under the Dodge and DeSoto brands. Over 2.1 million units were manufactured under the Plymouth brand.

== Production beginnings (1949–1950) ==
=== 1949 Model ===
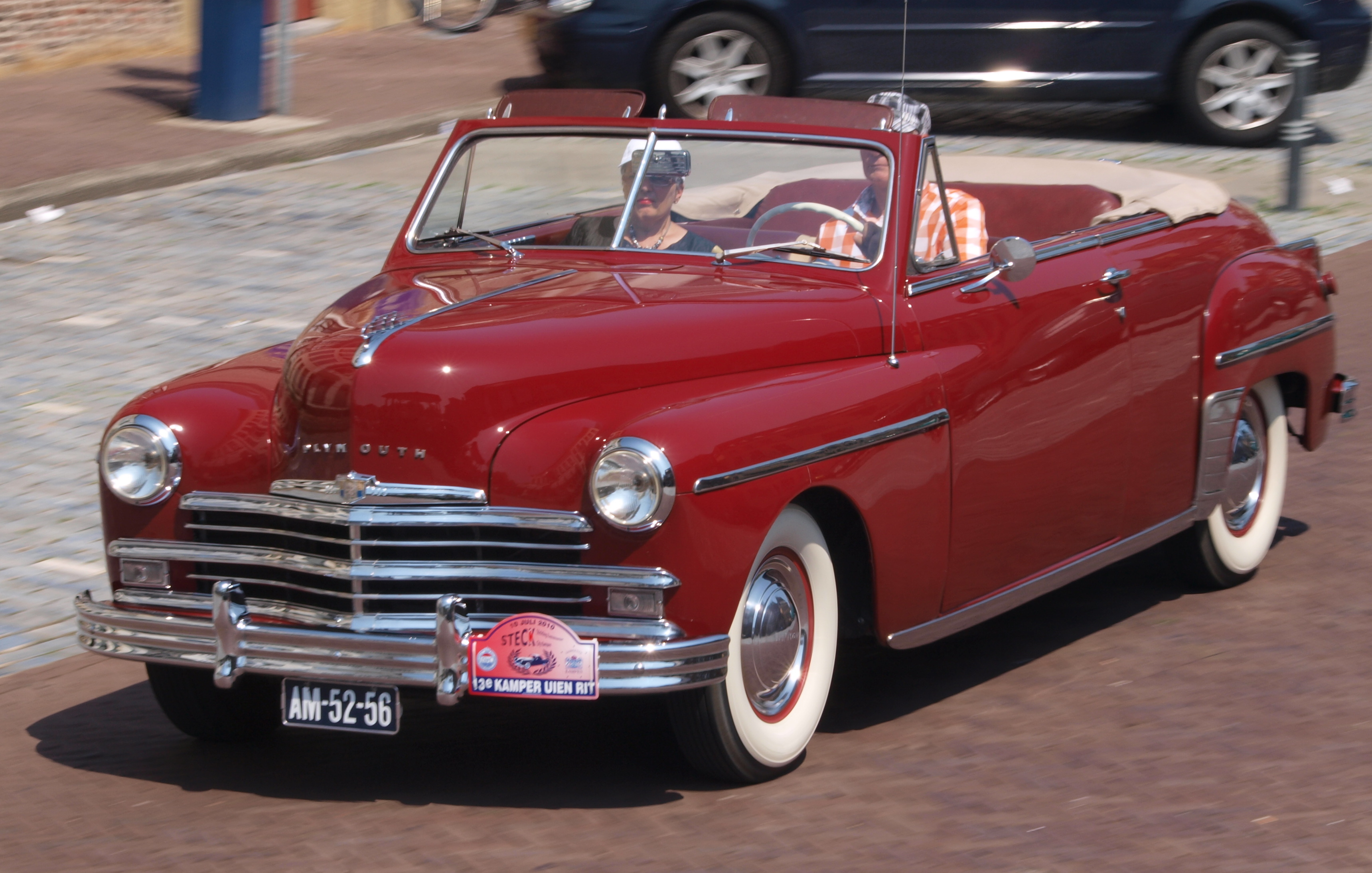
1949 Plymouth Special De Luxe convertible

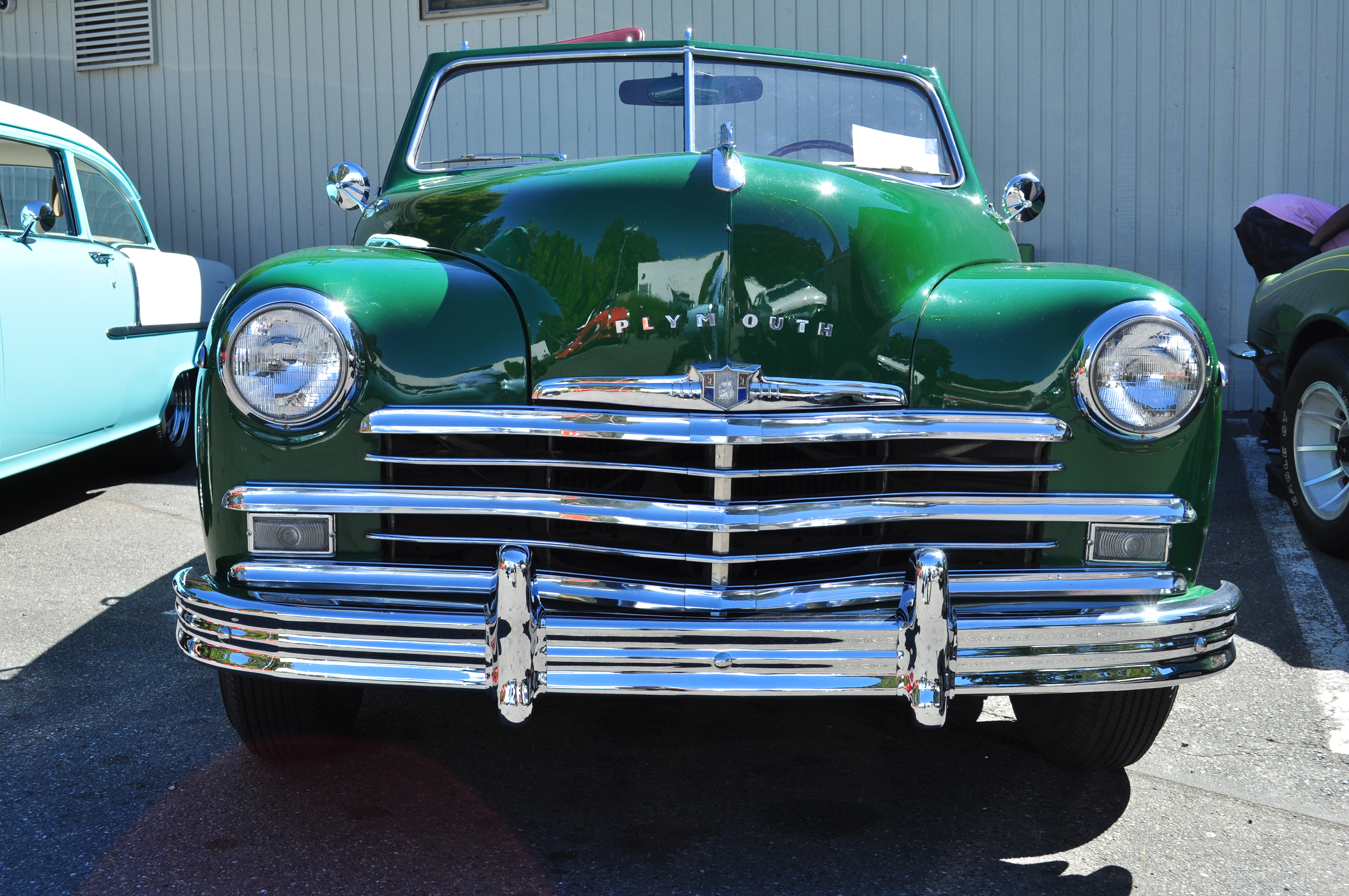
1949 Plymouth Special De Luxe, front view

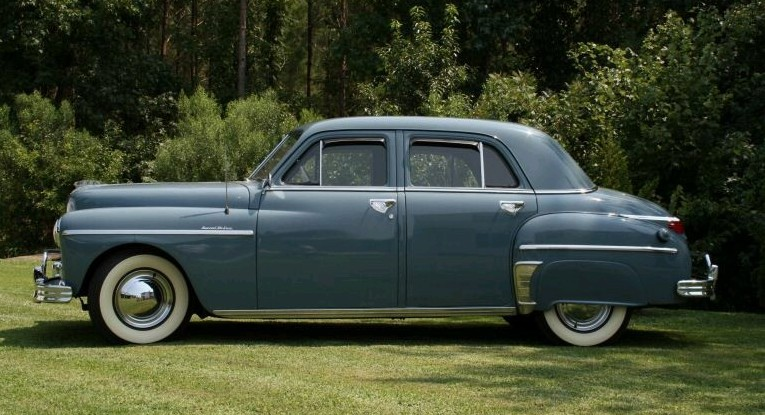
1949 Plymouth Special De Luxe sedan

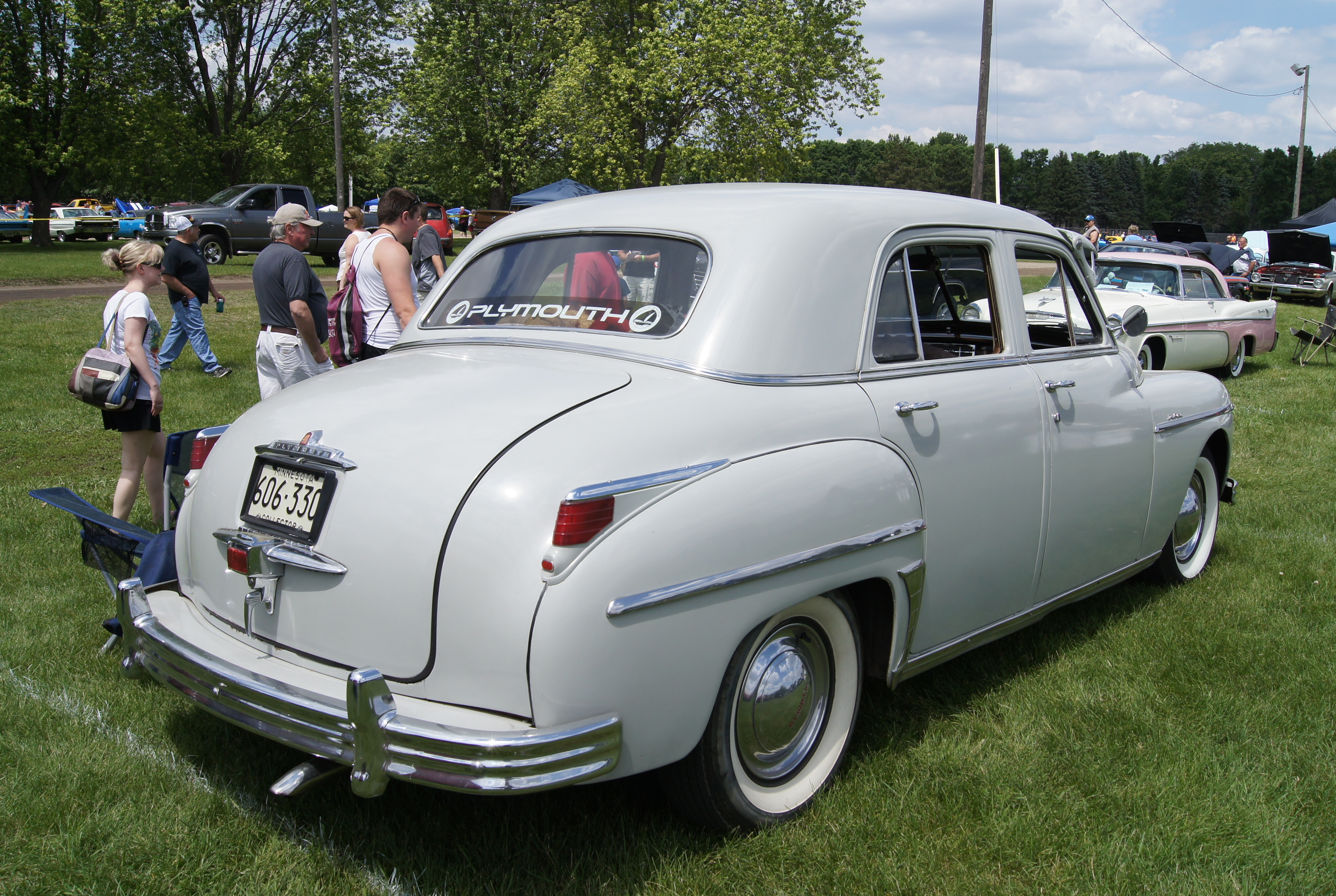
1949 Plymouth Special De Luxe sedan, rear view

The American Chrysler Corporation introduced its first entirely new postwar designs in 1949. In the most popular and affordable full-size car segment in the U.S. market, Chrysler produced vehicles under the Plymouth brand, directly competing with Ford and Chevrolet. The new Plymouth model debuted in March 1949, the last of the "Big Three" manufacturers, nine months after the 1949 Ford and three months after Chevrolet. The range included two main models: the base De Luxe and the better-finished Special De Luxe, built on the same structure and body, available in several body styles. Additionally, in May 1949, De Luxe variants with a shorter wheelbase of 282 cm (P17) were introduced alongside the standard 301 cm wheelbase models (P18). The introduction of shorter variants was a novelty for Chrysler. Due to the late market introduction during the model year, the first series of Plymouths produced in 1949 is considered part of the 1948 model year, while the proper 1949 model is also referred to as the second series of that year.

Under the influence of Chrysler's then-president K.T. Keller, the new Plymouths were conservatively styled with a tall body, though 4 cm lower than the previous generation. The priority was to create cars that were easy to enter, offering ample headroom and a wider interior despite a slightly narrower exterior width. The front fenders formed modern, seamless surfaces with the body sides, but the rear fenders, though reduced, still protruded slightly and were bolted to the body (presented as an advantage for easier repairs). The narrow engine hood still protruded sharply upward, with a vertical front edge. The windshield area was increased by 37%, but it remained two-piece, consisting of two flat, angled panes. Headlights were traditionally placed at the extension of the fenders, which were lower than the hood. The grille in the first year resembled the previous model, featuring five decorative horizontal bars, with the bottom, middle, and top bars thicker. The bottom and middle bars spanned the entire front width, passing under the headlights and encompassing rectangular parking lights. Directly above the grille on the hood's nose was a chrome-plated emblem with the Mayflower ship (linked to the city of Plymouth), the word PLYMOUTH above it, and a stylized ship ornament atop the hood. Side decorations included moldings on the front and rear fenders, a sill molding, and a shield on the front of the rear fender for the Special De Luxe. Optional covered rear wheels were available. Characteristic of the 1949 model were the P18's tail lights in decorative fin-like housings at the top of the fenders, with a single brake light on the trunk lid. The interior and dashboard were also updated compared to previous models. Changes to the frame chassis and drivetrain were minimal.

1949 model – variants
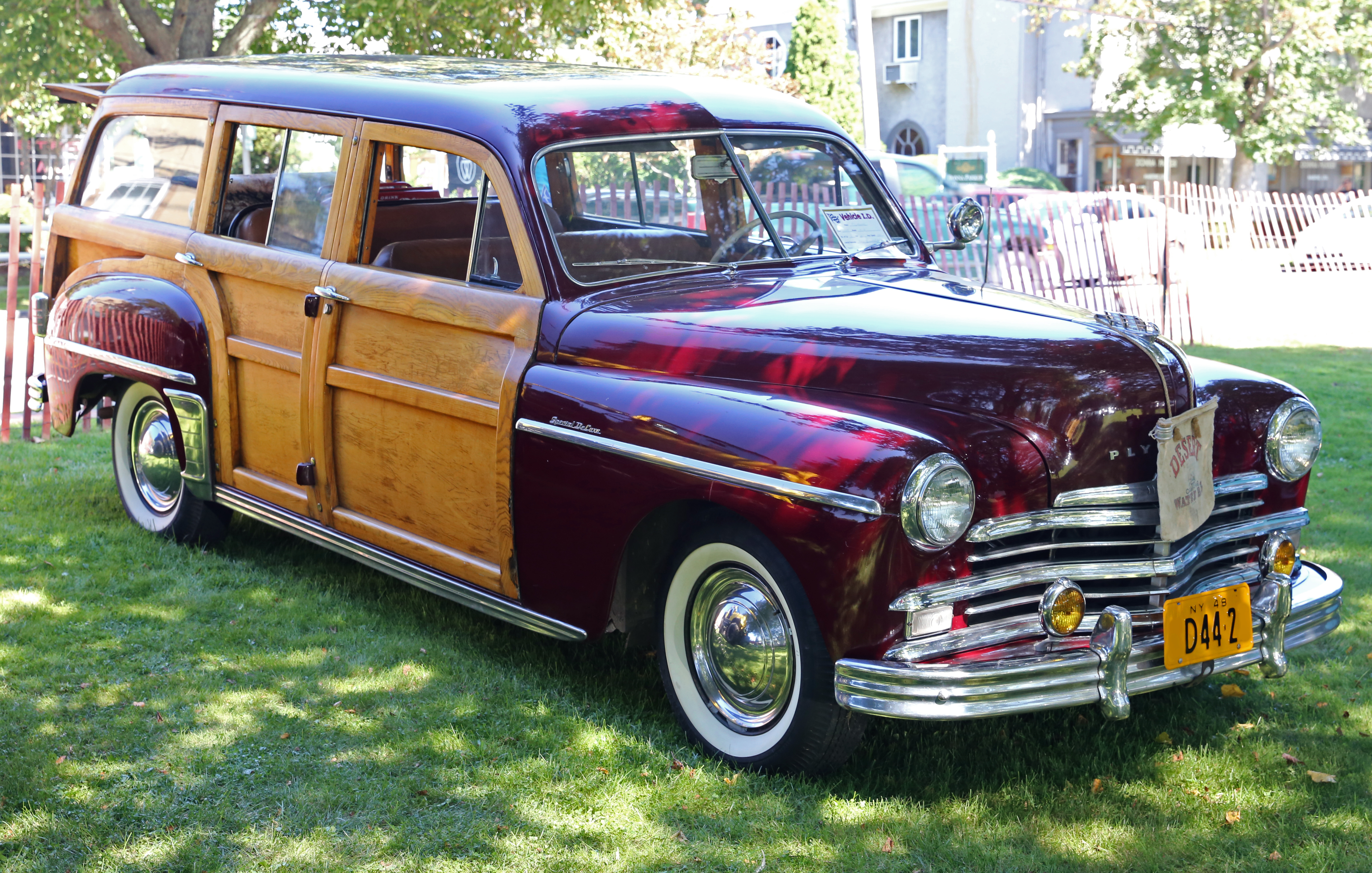
1949 Plymouth Special DeLuxe wagon (wooden body)

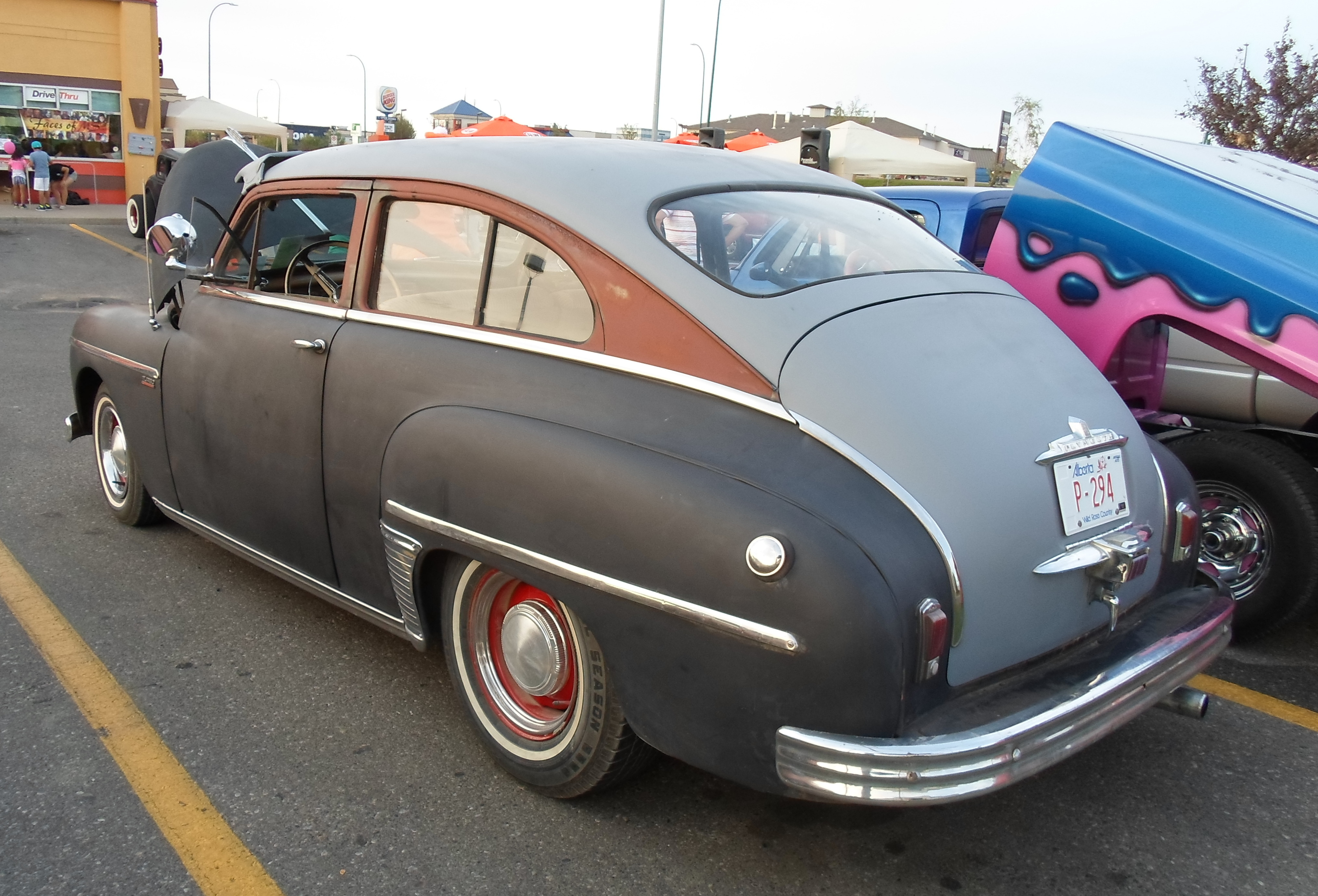
1949 Plymouth DeLuxe 2-door sedan

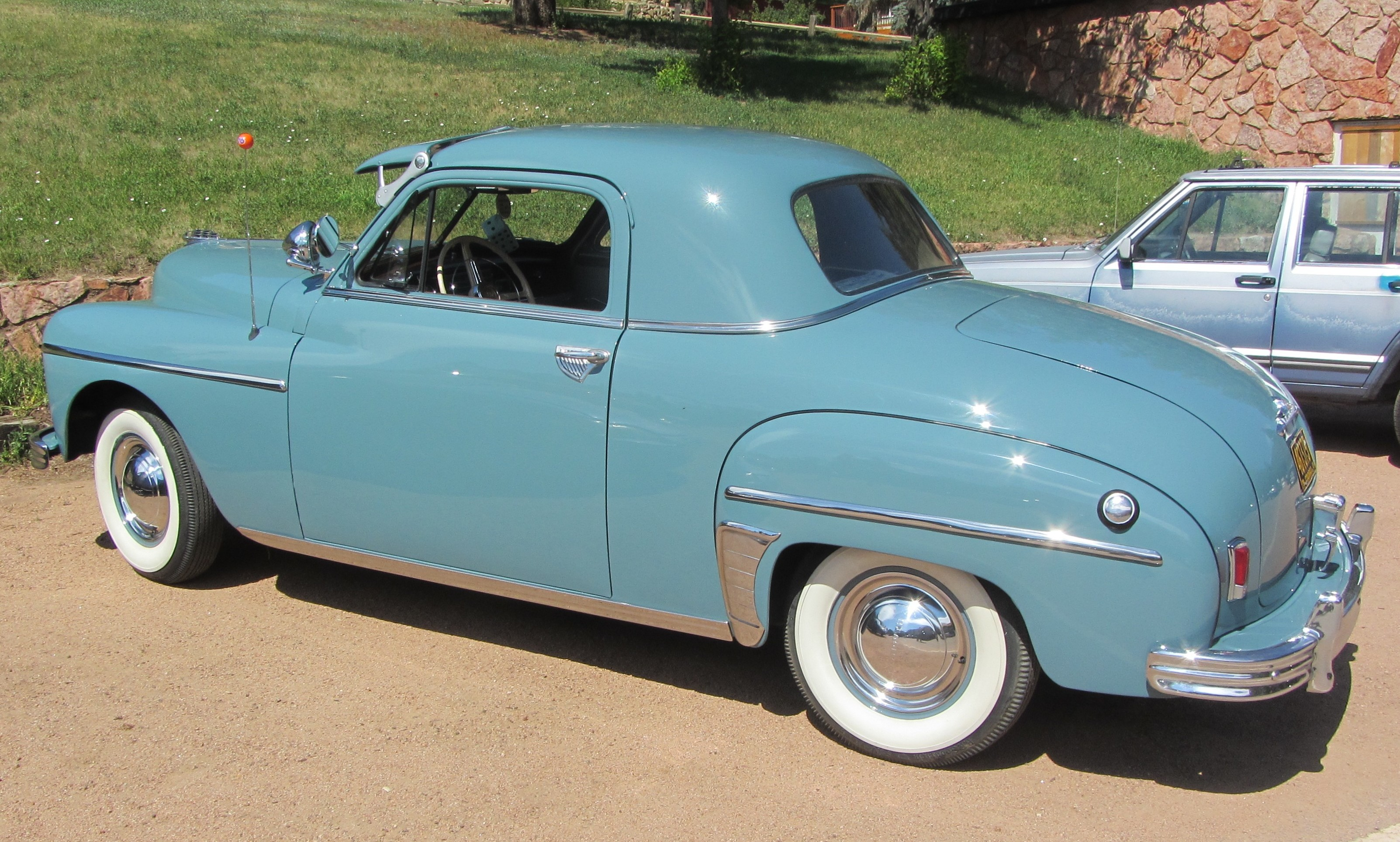
1949 Plymouth DeLuxe Coupe

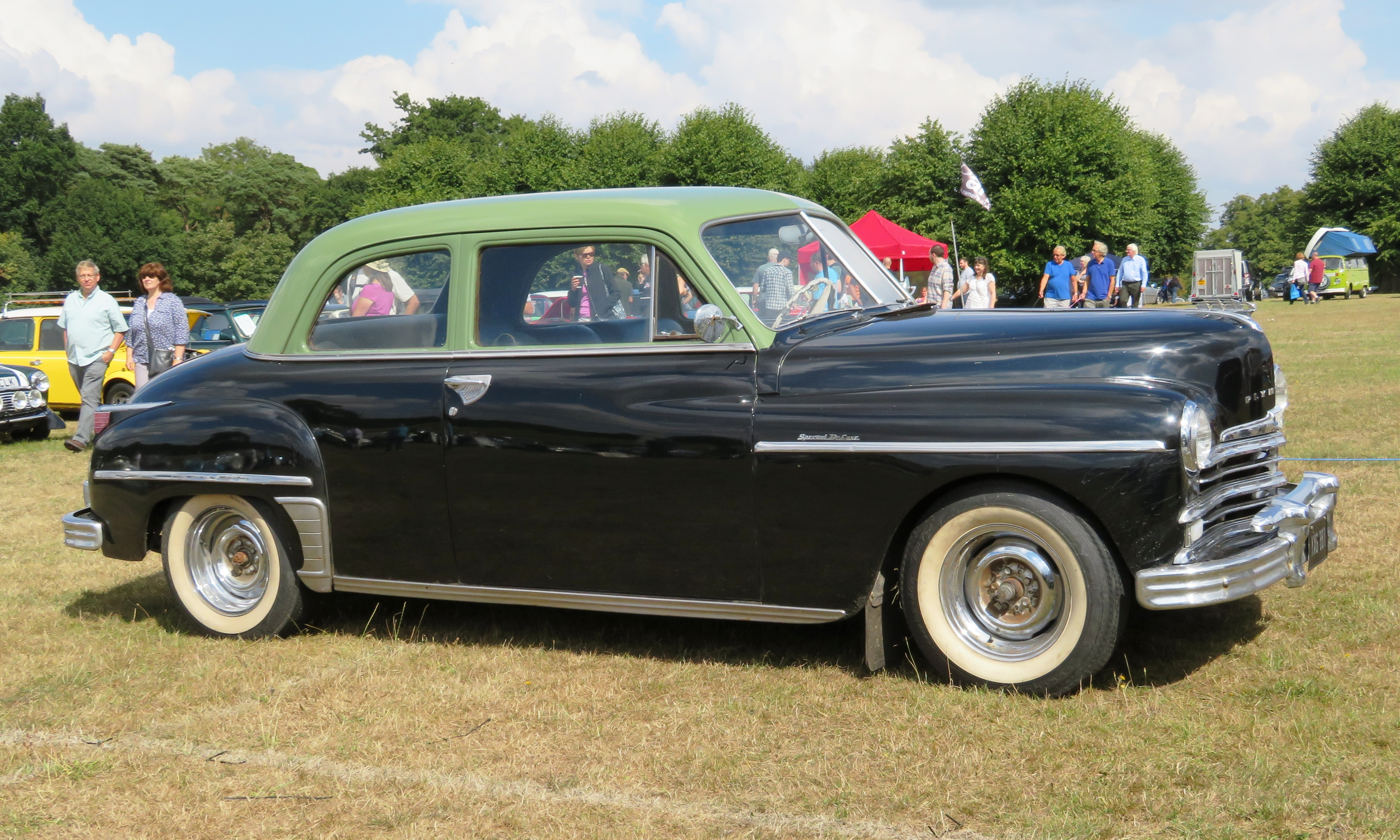
1949 Plymouth Special DeLuxe Club Coupe

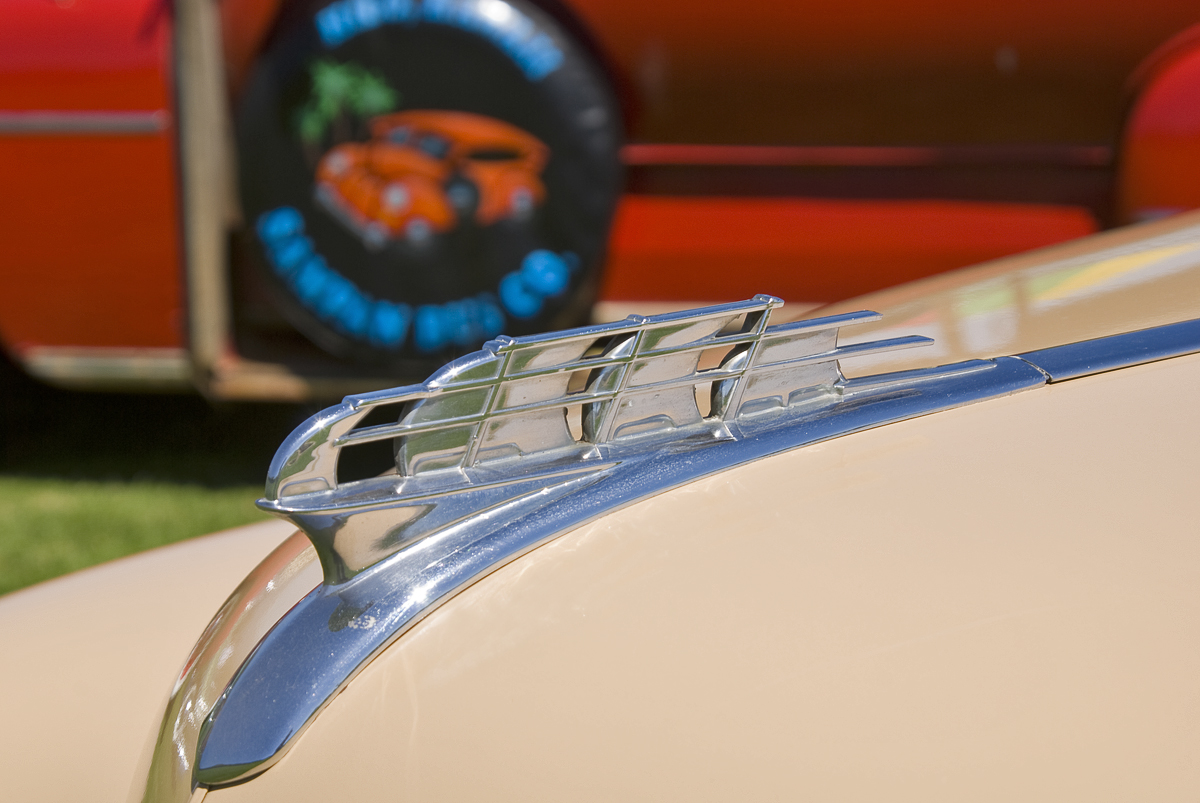
1949 hood ornament

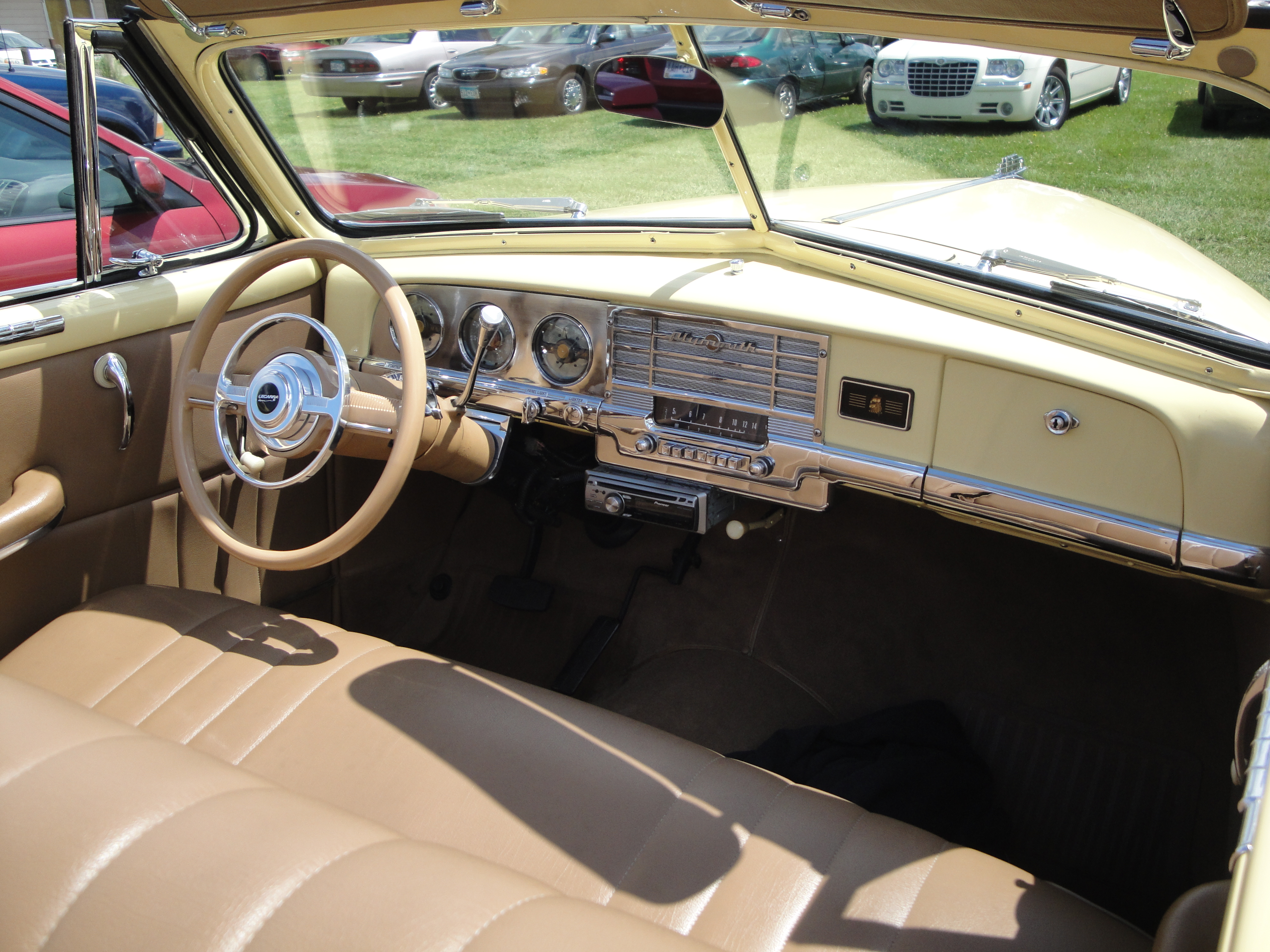
1949 dashboard in a convertible (non-original steering wheel)

The model and body variants included:

- De Luxe (code P17) – 111-inch (282 cm) wheelbase:
  - 2-door 3-seat coupe (Coupe);
  - 2-door 6-seat sedan (2-Door Sedan);
  - 3-door 6-seat station wagon (Suburban Wagon);
- De Luxe (code P18) – 118.5-inch (301 cm) wheelbase:
  - 2-door 6-seat coupe (Club Coupe);
  - 4-door 6-seat sedan (4-Door Sedan);
- Special De Luxe (code P18) – 118.5-inch (301 cm) wheelbase:
  - 2-door 6-seat coupé (Club Coupe);
  - 2-door 5-seat convertible (Convertible);
  - 4-door 6-seat sedan (Sedan);
  - 5-door 8-seat wagon (Station Wagon).

The Special De Luxe had a better-finished interior, stainless steel windshield and rear window trim, and a chrome shield on the front edge of the rear fenders. The convertible's roof was electrically operated. The short-wheelbase De Luxe two-door sedan had a fastback-style body. The three-door six-seat De Luxe Suburban wagon had a steel body, offering a cargo space of 106 cm or 174 cm with the rear seat folded, while the five-door eight-seat Special De Luxe Station Wagon had a wooden "woodie" body with a steel roof. Contemporary literature claimed the Special De Luxe wagon could "easily" accommodate nine passengers.

The only available engine was an improved unit from previous years, with slightly higher compression and power:

- 6-cylinder straight-six engine, gasoline, flathead, 217.8 displacement (3.6 L), producing 97 hp (gross).

The engine was paired with a three-speed manual transmission, driving the rear wheels via a differential. Tires were sized 6.40×15 (P17) or 6.70×15 (P18). The Suburban wagon optionally had 18-inch wheels.

A total of 519,400 Plymouths of the second 1949 series were produced, a 27% increase from the previous year, securing Plymouth third place in the U.S. market with a 10% share. Base prices ranged from $1,371 for the De Luxe coupe to $2,372 for the Special De Luxe wagon (average: $1,690). The most popular model was the Special De Luxe four-door sedan (252,878 units, $1,629). The practical steel Suburban wagon (19,220 units, $1,840) was relatively popular for its time, while the expensive wooden wagon found only 3,443 buyers.

In the U.S., the cars were produced in three existing factories in Detroit, Los Angeles, and Evansville, as well as a new second California plant in San Leandro. They were also assembled in Canada at the Windsor factory, including under the Dodge brand. Cars of this family (including the P23 series from 1951–52) were also produced in Australia in Adelaide.

=== 1950 model ===
In January 1950, the models underwent a minor facelift. The grille was simplified and modernized, now consisting of three horizontal bars, with the top bar curved downward at the ends to frame the grille opening. The hood emblem was placed above the PLYMOUTH lettering, and the ornament's design was altered. The rear window was enlarged by 32%, and the rear fenders' ends were raised, with tail lights relocated to the fenders' rear edge. Bumpers were simplified. The dashboard was updated. Suspension modifications lowered the cars by about 2 cm and slightly increased the track width. In terms of body variants, a three-door De Luxe Suburban wagon with Special-level trim was introduced. Short-wheelbase models were coded P19, and long-wheelbase models P20.

A total of 608,862 Plymouths were produced for the 1950 model year. Despite this, Plymouth's market share fell to about 9%, possibly dropping to fourth place behind the more expensive Buick. Prices remained unchanged.

== Restyling and model naming (1951–1952) ==
=== 1951 model ===
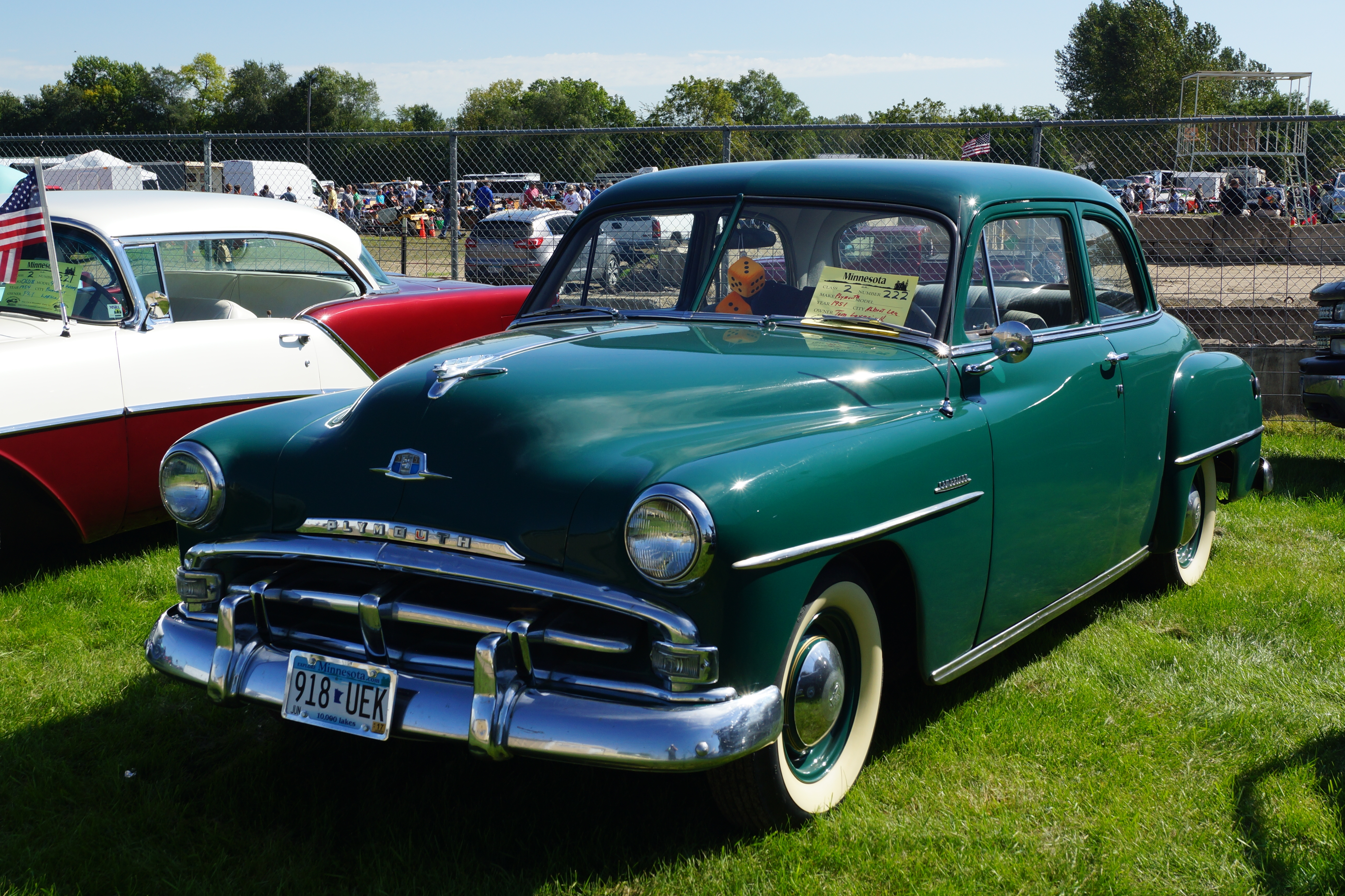
1951 Plymouth Cambridge club coupe

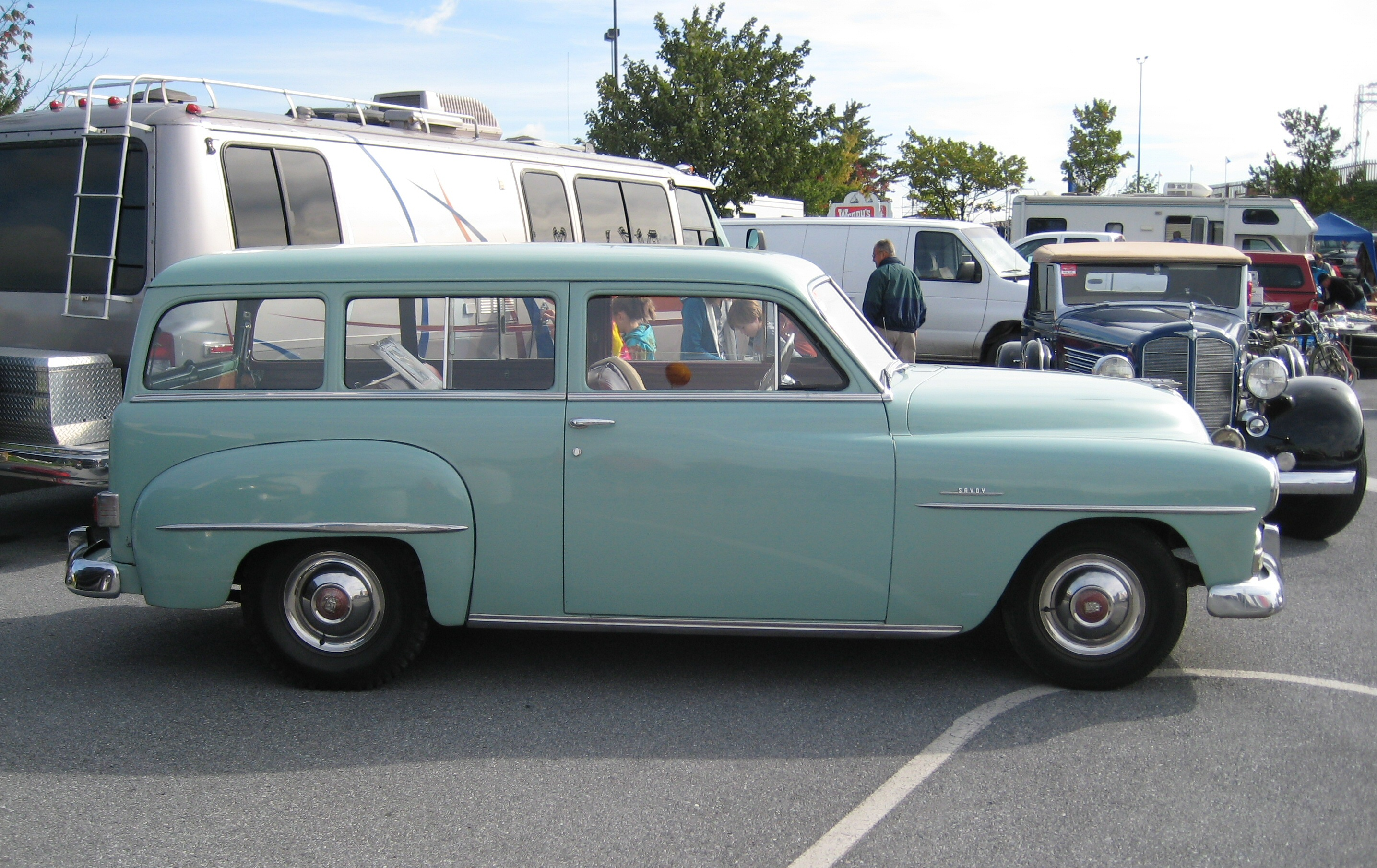
1951 Plymouth Concord Savoy

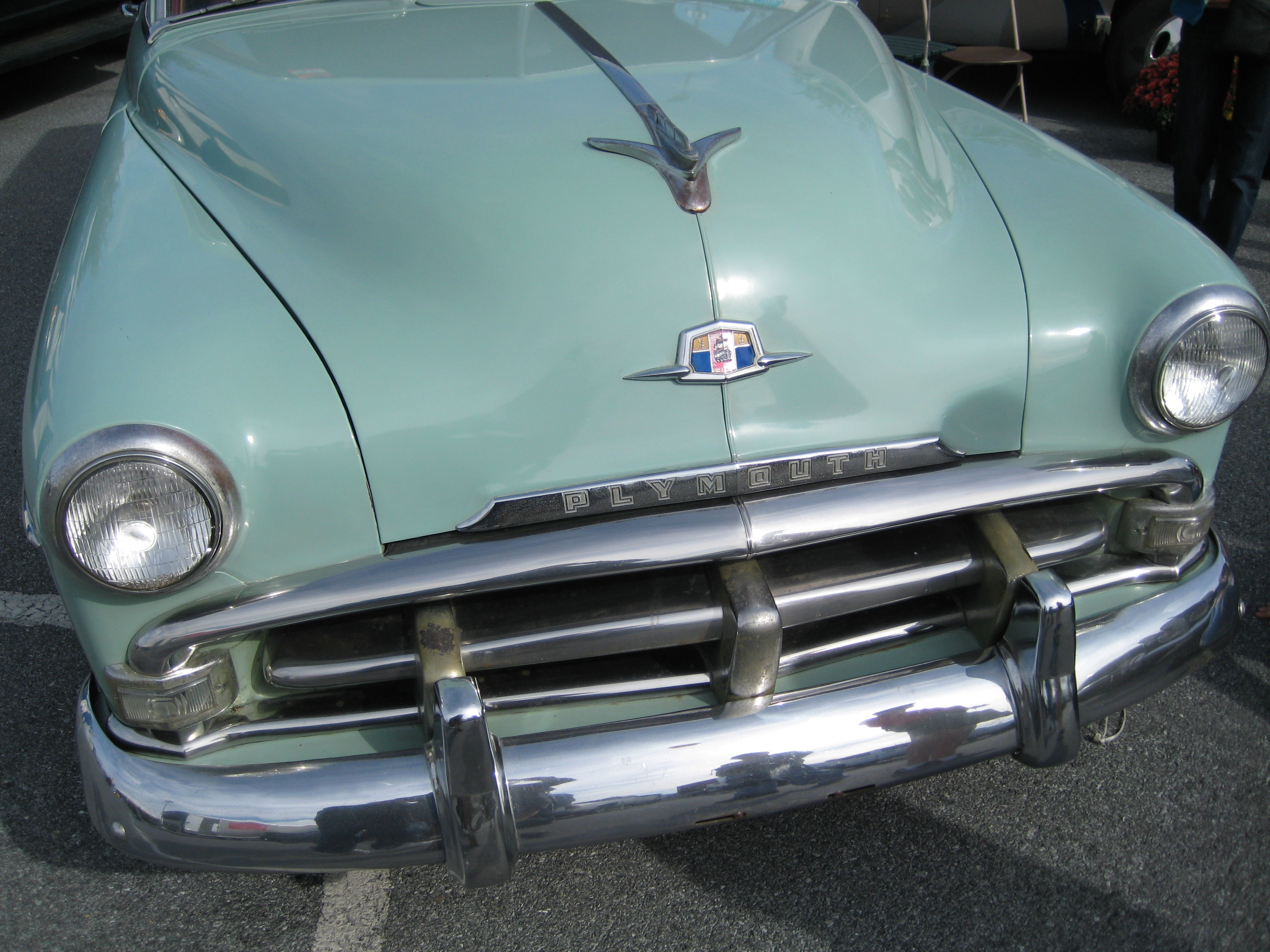
1951 Plymouth Concord Savoy, front view

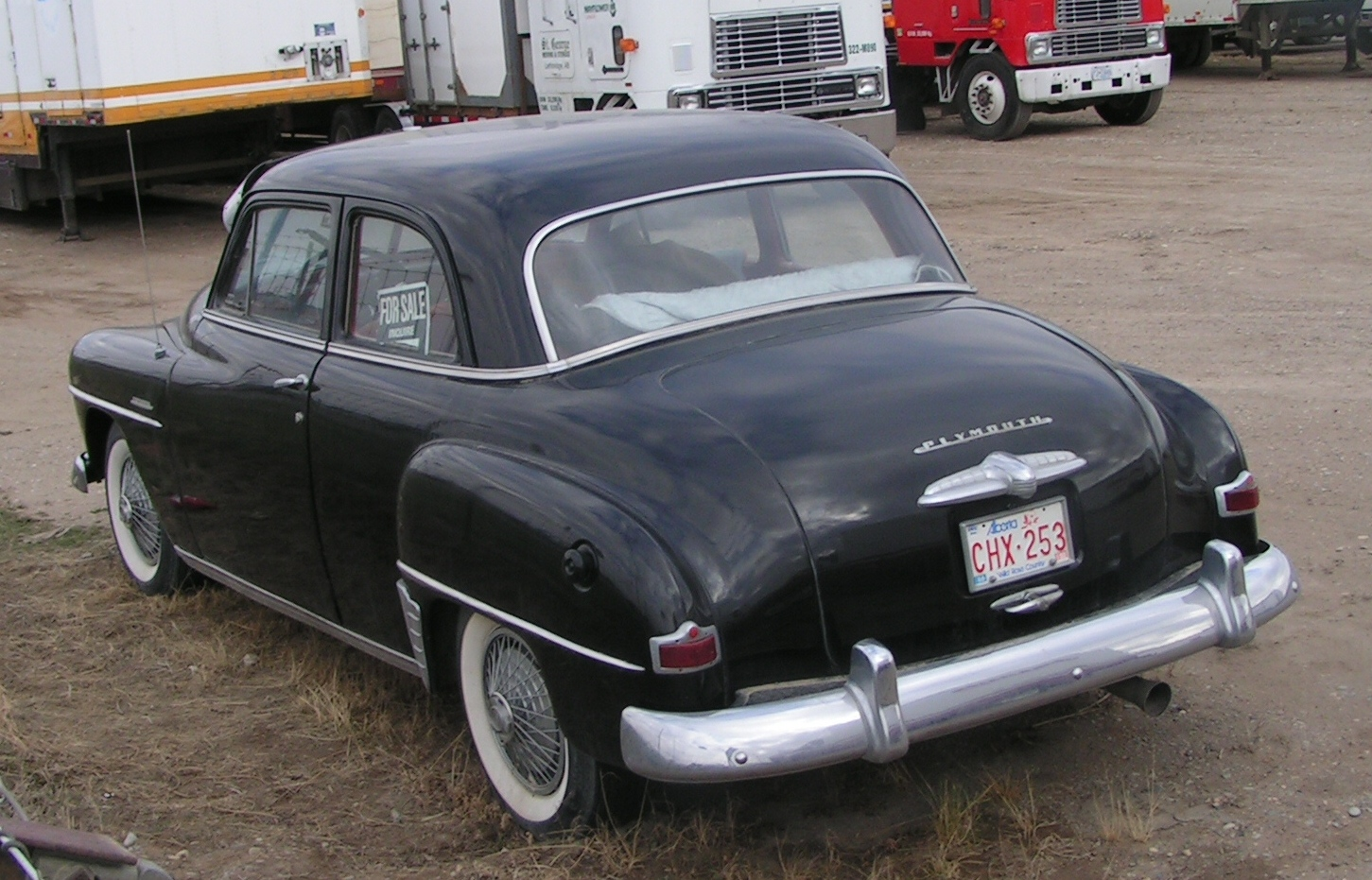
1951 Plymouth Cambridge club coupe, rear view

The new Plymouth lineup for 1951, introduced in December 1950, received distinct model names starting with the letter C for the first time, moving away from descriptive designations. The Concord (P22) replaced the short-wheelbase De Luxe, the Cambridge (P-23S) replaced the long-wheelbase De Luxe, and the Cranbrook (P-23C) included better-finished or exclusive body styles, succeeding the Special De Luxe. A new body style was the 2-door 6-seat hardtop Cranbrook Belvedere. The expensive five-door wooden wagon was discontinued due to its impracticality, leaving only the steel three-door wagon in the Concord, named Suburban or Savoy.

Still based on the 1949 design, the car was restyled more significantly. Changes were modest, primarily affecting the front, where the hood's nose remained prominent but was slightly lowered and flattened, with smoother transitions to the fenders, modernizing the appearance. The split windshield was slightly enlarged. A new, lower, and wider grille featured three horizontal stainless steel bars. The top, curved bar framed the grille from the top and sides, with rectangular parking lights on its ends. The two lower bars were connected by three vertical ribs, with the outer ribs' extensions forming the bumper's fangs. Above the grille, a decorative metal strip with recessed PLYMOUTH lettering sat on the hood's nose, topped by a shield-shaped Mayflower emblem, and a stylized ship-and-waves ornament adorned the hood's top. Side decorations included moldings on the front and rear fenders, with the model name above the front fender. The entire body was lowered by about 3 cm. The dashboard was completely redesigned. For the first time among postwar models, the Belvedere hardtop could be painted in two colors. New "Oriflow" shock absorbers improved ride comfort. The front profile changes enhanced driver visibility, rated as very good.

A total of 596,725 Plymouths were produced for the 1951 model year, regaining a market share above 10% and third place in the U.S. The Cranbrook accounted for 57% of production. Prices rose by about 12%, ranging from $1,537 for the Concord coupe to $2,222 for the Cranbrook convertible (average: $1,886).

=== 1952 model ===
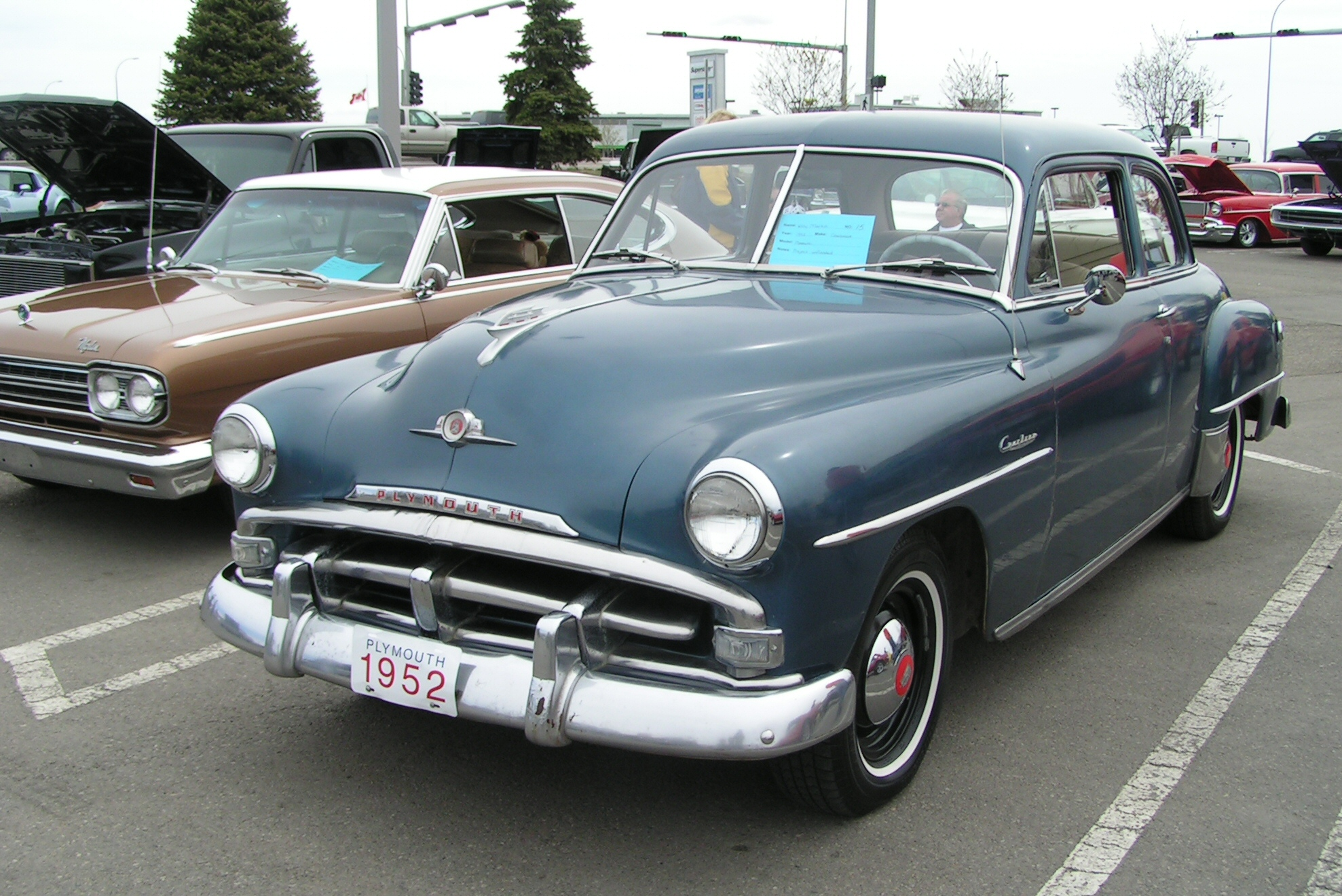
1952 Plymouth Cranbrook club coupe

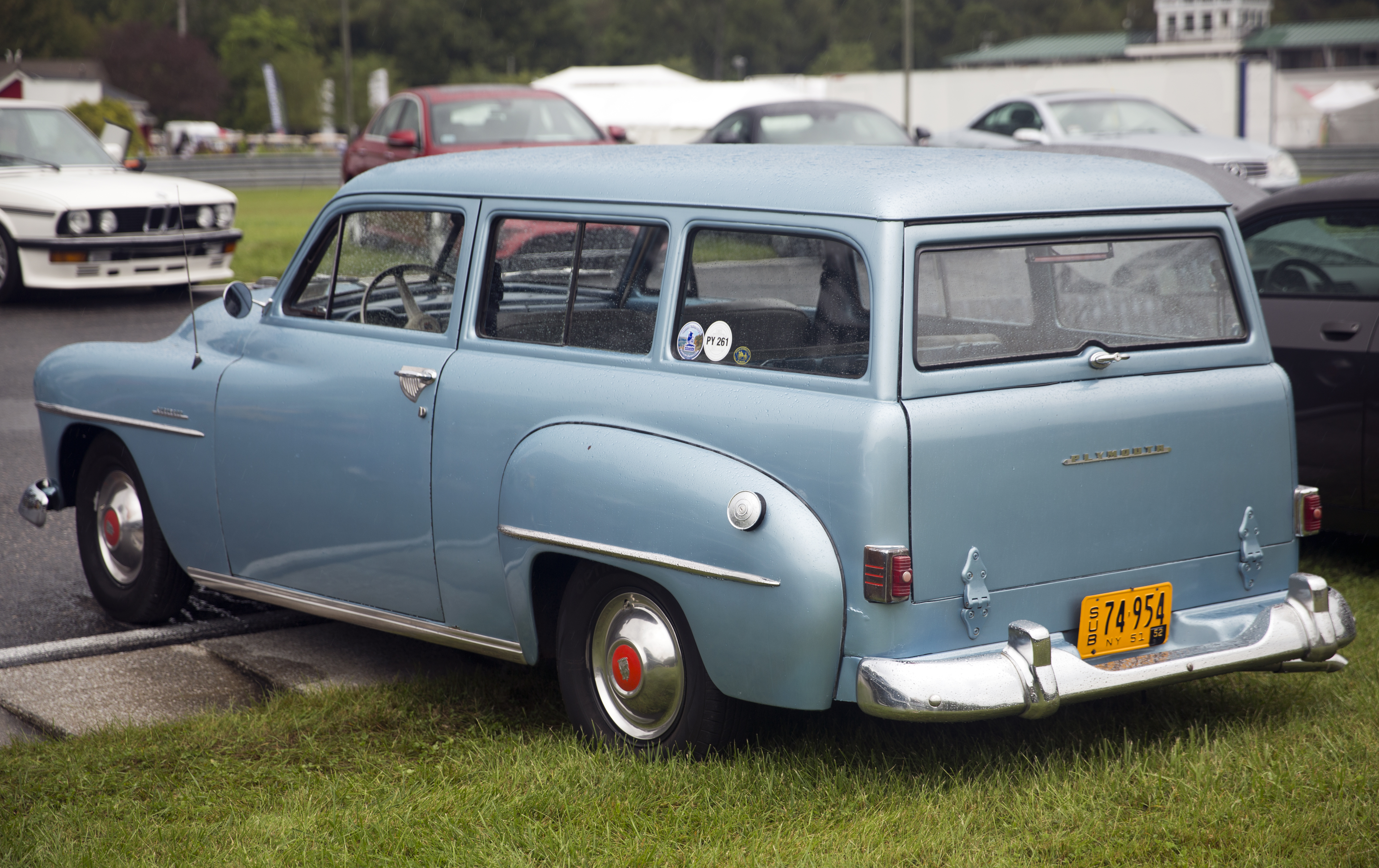
1952 Plymouth Concord Suburban

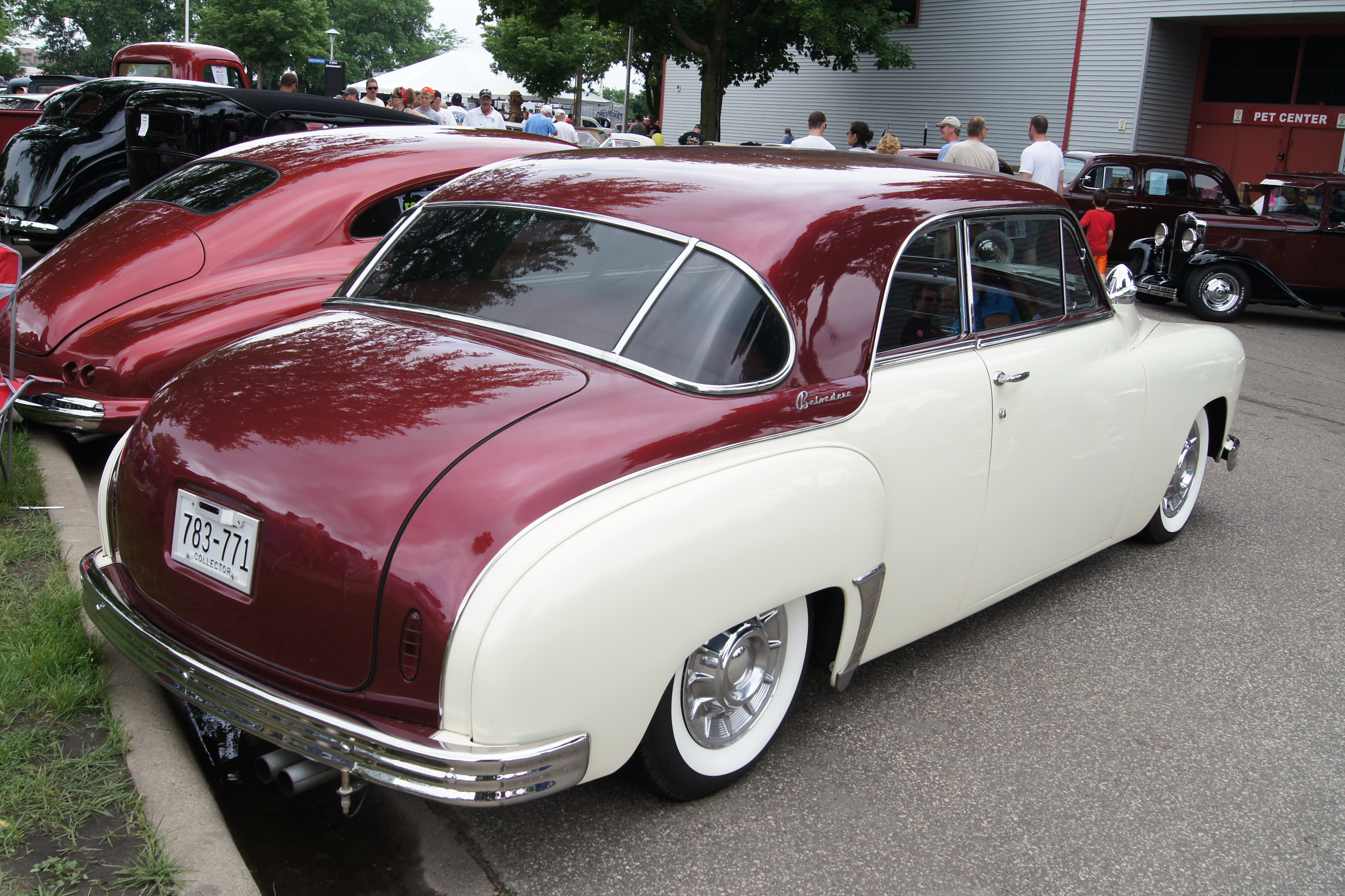
1952 Plymouth Cranbrook Belvedere (modified – non-original lights)

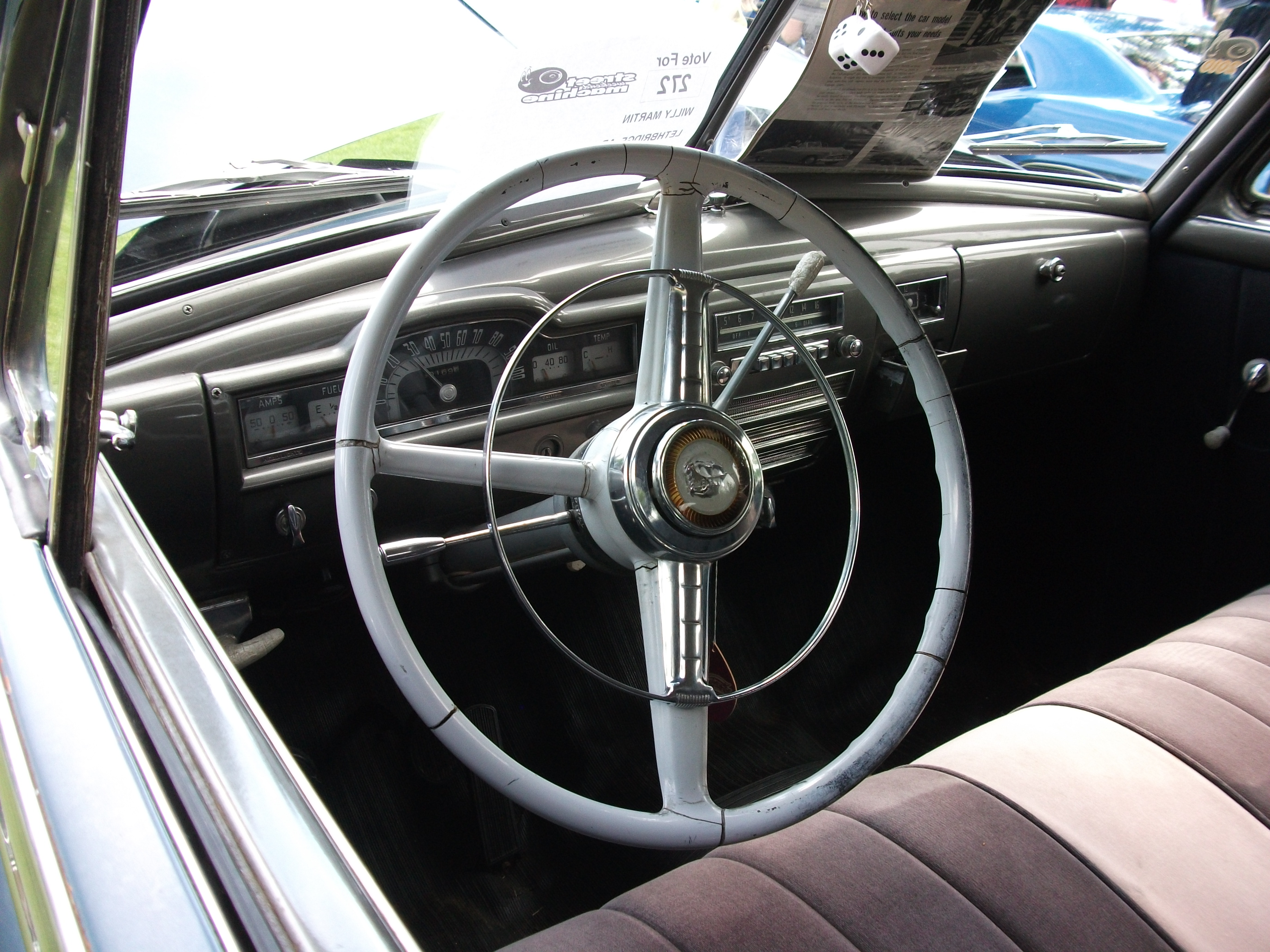
1952 Plymouth Cranbrook – dashboard

Plymouth planned a completely new car for 1952, but material shortages due to the Korean War prevented this, resulting in continued production of the slightly modified model. Styling changes were minimal, mainly involving updated hood and trunk ornaments. The hood's ship emblem was now round, and the ornament was reshaped to resemble a ship without waves. A minor side change was the model names on the fender, now in script rather than sans-serif small caps. Optional Solex tinted glass was introduced. Mechanically, an optional overdrive for the transmission improved highway fuel economy (for $102).

The 1952 models were introduced on 4 January 1952 with 410,937 units produced, maintaining over a 10% U.S. market share. The Cranbrook remained the most popular model (57.8%). Prices increased slightly, ranging from $1,601 for the Concord coupe to $2,273 for the Concord Savoy wagon and $2,313 for the Cranbrook convertible (average: $1,964). The model year was shorter, as new 1953 Plymouths were introduced on November 20, 1952.

== Sales under other brands ==
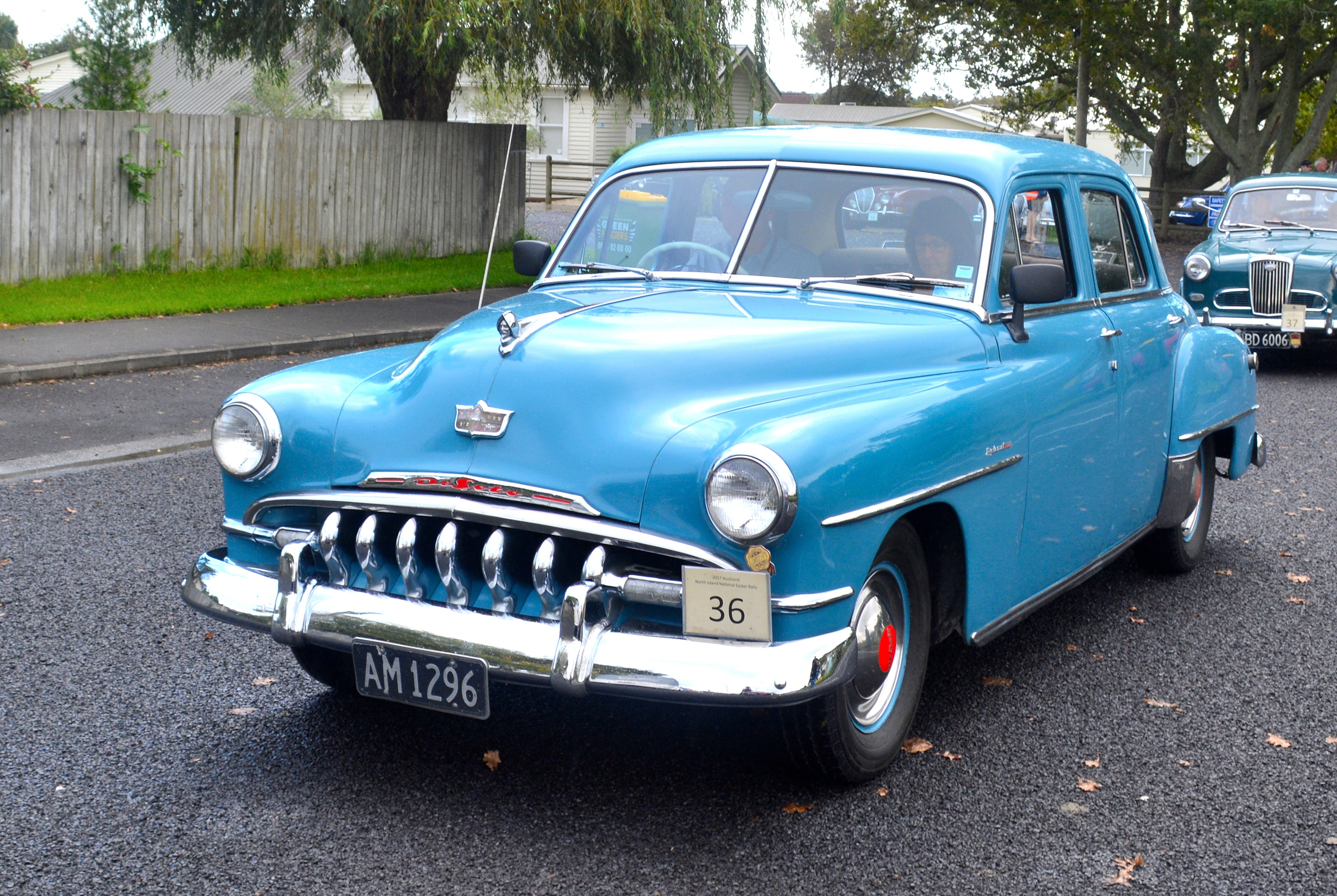
1952 DeSoto Diplomat

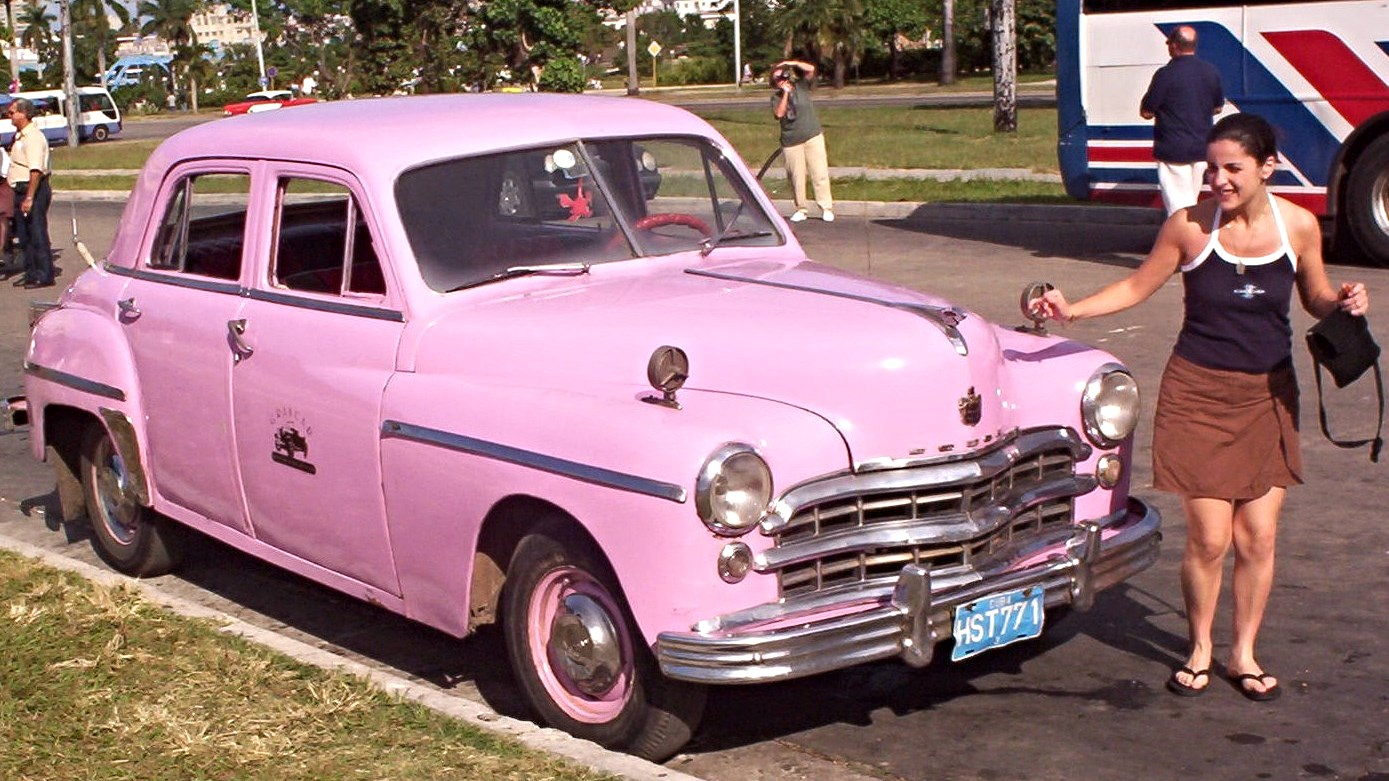
1949 Dodge Kingsway

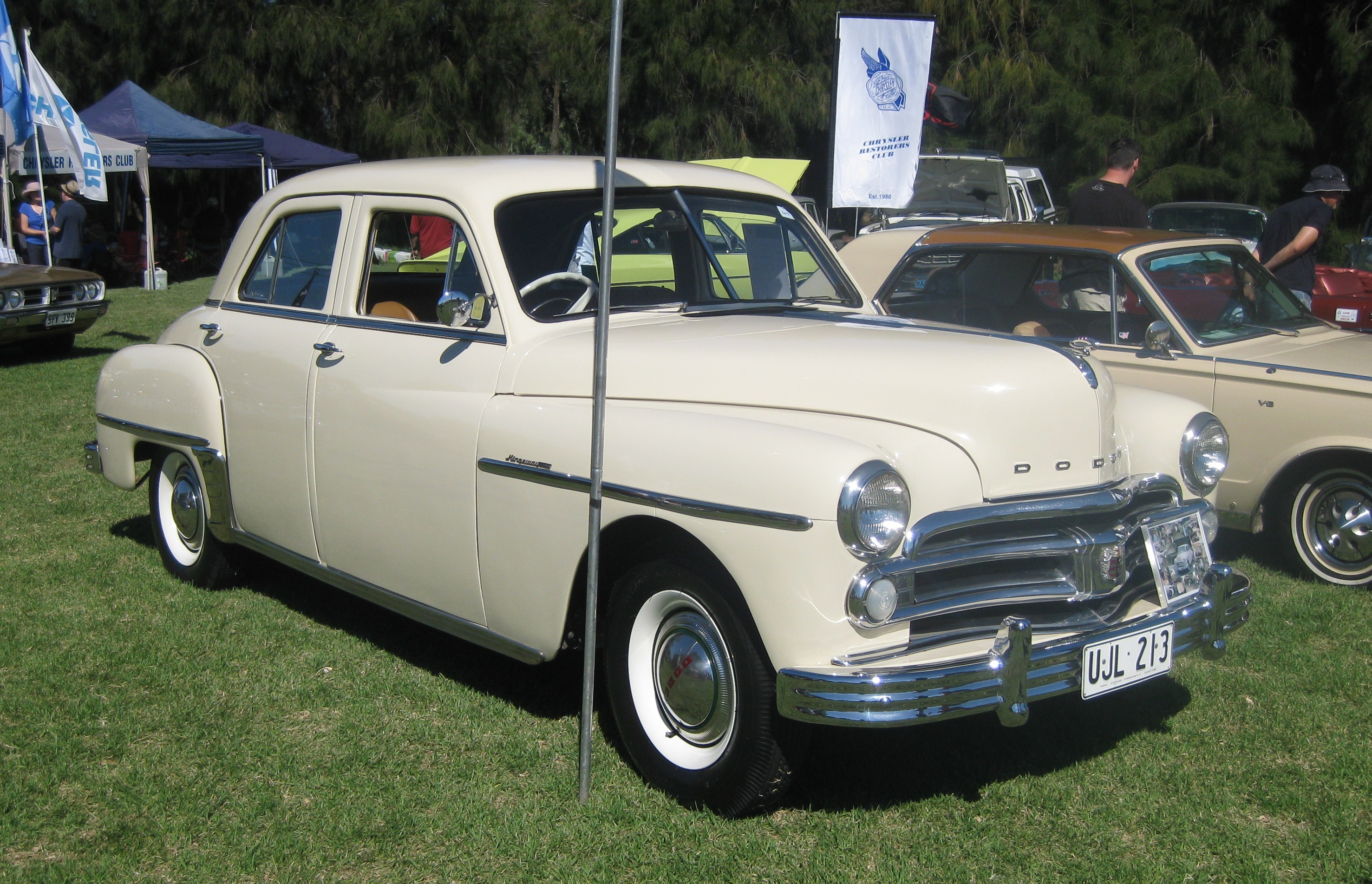
1950 Australian Dodge Kingsway

The 1949 Plymouth De Luxe and Special De Luxe models were also produced with modified details under the Dodge brand for the Canadian market, sold through Dodge's dealer network as Dodge Kingsway and Dodge Regent, respectively. Similarly, they were produced for export outside the U.S. and Canada as Dodge Kingsway De Luxe and Special De Luxe, and under the DeSoto brand as DeSoto Diplomat De Luxe and Special De Luxe. Changes were primarily limited to the grille, ornaments, and interior elements specific to these brands.

From 1951, the Plymouth Concord, Cambridge, and Cranbrook were sold for export as Dodge Kingsway or DeSoto Diplomat, with Cambridge and Cranbrook also carrying De Luxe and Special De Luxe designations. In Canada, these models were named Dodge Kingsway, Dodge Crusader, and Dodge Regent, respectively.

== Technical specifications ==
1951 model
Dimensions
• Wheelbase:	2,819 mm (111.0 in) / 3,010 mm (119 in)
• Length:	4,780 mm (188 in) / 4,922 mm (193.8 in)
• Width:	1,849 mm (72.8 in)
• Height:	1,595 mm (62.8 in) / 1,636 mm (64.4 in)
• Curb Weight:	1,347 kg (2,970 lb) / 1,410 kg (3,110 lb)
• Track Width:	1,419 mm (55.9 in) front, 1,484 mm (58.4 in) rear
• Seat Width:	1,391 mm (54.8 in) front, 1,245 mm (49.0 in) rear / 1,397 mm (55.0 in) front, 1,448 mm (57.0 in) rear
Drivetrain:
• Engine:	Carbureted, straight-six, flathead, liquid-cooled, longitudinally mounted, rear-wheel drive
• Displacement:	3,569 cm^{3} (217.8 cu in)
• Bore × Stroke:	83 mm × 111 mm (3.3 in × 4.4 in)
• Maximum Power:	97 hp at 3,600 rpm
• Compression Ratio:	7:1
• Fuel System:	Single-barrel carburetor
• Transmission:	3-speed manual with reverse, 2nd and 3rd gears synchronized
• Clutch:	Single-plate, dry
• Final Drive:	Hypoid, ratio 3.9:1 or 3.73:1
• Electrical System:	6 V, electric ignition, key-operated
Chassis and suspension
• Chassis:	Welded box-section frame
• Front suspension:	Independent, coil springs
• Rear suspension:	Rigid axle, semi-elliptical leaf springs, hydraulic telescopic shock absorbers
• Brakes:	Front and rear drum brakes, hydraulic
• Tires:	Bias-ply, 6.70×15 or 6.40×15
Performance
• Top speed:	150 km/h (93 mph) (per speedometer, realistically ~145 km/h) (1951)
• 0–97 km/h:	17.12 s (1951)
• Quarter-mile time:	21.1 s
• Turning diameter:	11.8 m or 11.3 m (1951)

== See also ==
- 1949 Ford

== Bibliography ==
- Flory, J. "Kelly" (2008). American Cars, 1946–1959: Every Model, Year by Year. McFarland & Company. ISBN 978-0-7864-3229-5.
