= Plymouth Cambridge =

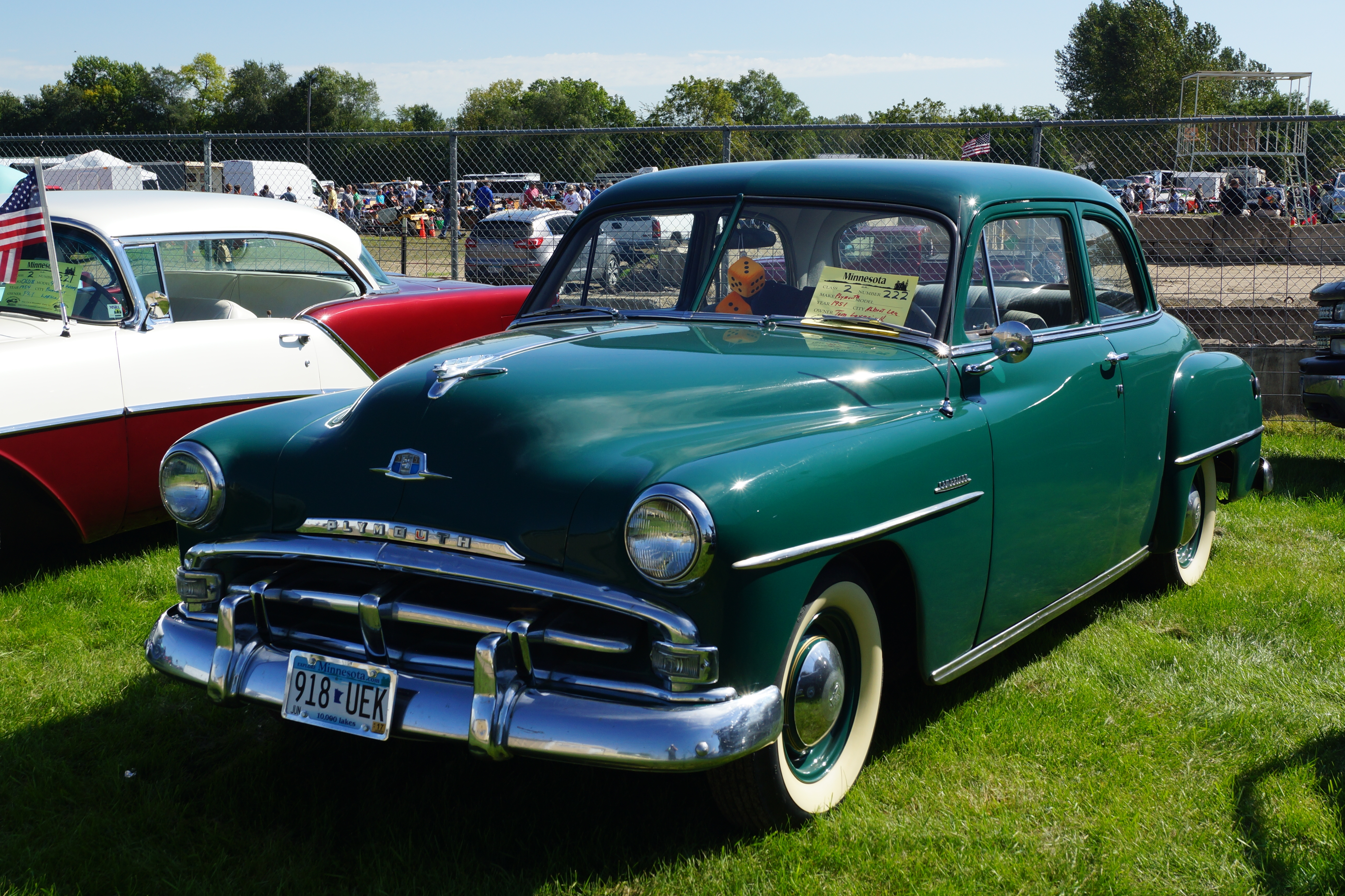
- 1951 Plymouth Cambridge Four-Door Sedan

Overview
- Manufacturer: Plymouth (Chrysler)
- Also called: Dodge Crusader
- Production: 1951–1953
- Assembly: United States; Australia

Body and chassis
- Class: Full-size
- Body style: 4-door sedan 2-door club coupe 2-door station wagon
- Layout: FR
- Related: Plymouth Concord; Plymouth Cranbrook

Powertrain
- Engine: 1951-52: 3.6 L I6 (97 bhp); 1953: 217.8CID(3.6 L) L-head 7.1:1 Compression Ratio 1-bbl. I6 (100 bhp)
- Transmission: 3-speed manual standard(1951-1953), "Hy-Drive" semi-automatic $146(1953), Automatic with Overdrive $98(1953)

Dimensions
- Wheelbase: 1951-52: 118.5 in (3,010 mm); 1953: 114 in (2,896 mm)
- Length: 1951-52: 193.875 in (4,924 mm); 1953: 189.125 in (4,804 mm)
- Width: 72.8" (1951), 73.4" (1953)

Chronology
- Predecessor: Plymouth Deluxe
- Successor: Plymouth Plaza

The Plymouth Cambridge is a full-size automobile, produced by Plymouth from 1951 until 1953. It was Plymouth's base-range base model in its 1951 and 1952 lineups, along with the shorter wheelbase Concord and the sole base model for 1953. It came with new features such as electric windshield wipers and downdraft carburetors when it was introduced. It also had "Safe-guard" brakes, that had two hydraulic cylinders per front wheel instead of just one It replaced the Deluxe, and was replaced by the Plaza for 1954.

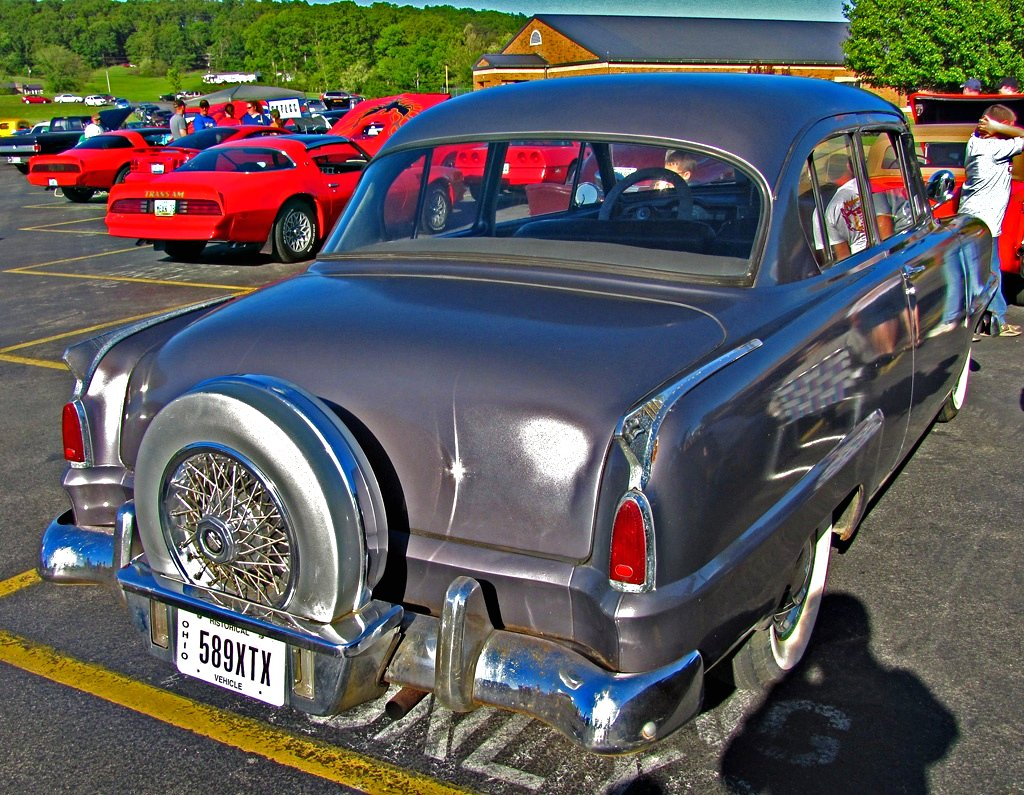
1953 Plymouth Cambridge Club Sedan (with non-standard wheels & spare wheel)
