= Plymouth Concord =

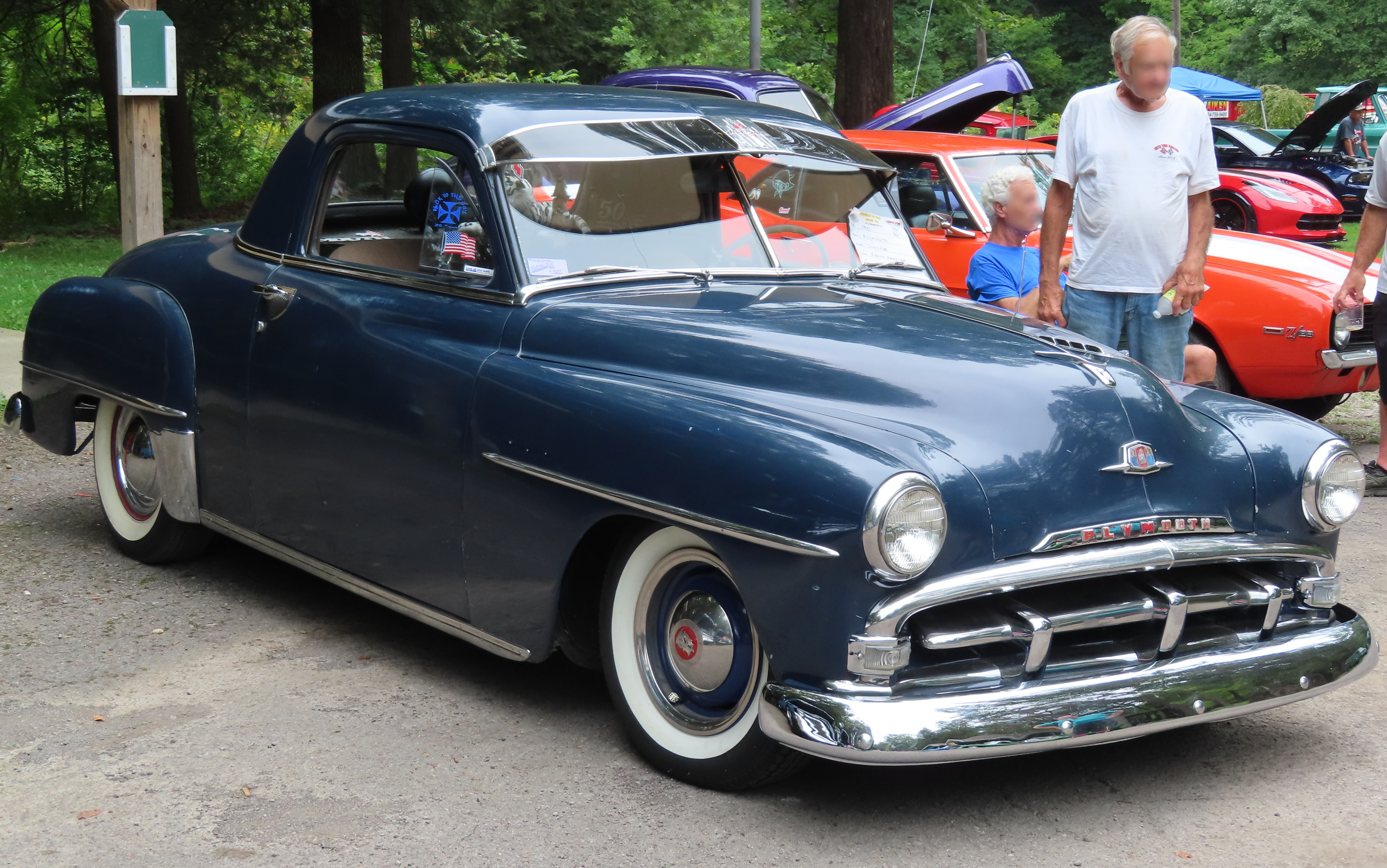
- 1951 Plymouth Concord Three Passenger Coupe

Overview
- Manufacturer: Plymouth (Chrysler)
- Production: 1951–1952
- Assembly: Lynch Road Assembly, Highland Park, MI

Body and chassis
- Class: Full-size
- Body style: 2-door business coupe; 2-door fastback sedan; 2-door station wagon
- Layout: FR layout
- Related: Plymouth Cambridge; Plymouth Cranbrook

Powertrain
- Engine: 217.8 cu in (3.6 L) I6; 97 brake horsepower (72 kW)
- Transmission: 3-speed manual; 3-speed with overdrive

Dimensions
- Wheelbase: 111 in (2,819 mm)
- Length: 188.125 in (4,778 mm)
- Curb weight: 3,200–3,400 lb (1,451–1,542 kg)

Chronology
- Predecessor: Plymouth Deluxe (SWB)
- Successor: Plymouth Cambridge (1953)

The Plymouth Concord, is a full-size car, produced by Plymouth between 1951 and 1952. It was Plymouth's least expensive model in its lineup, replacing the Deluxe.

== Models ==
This line of Plymouths was introduced in 1951 when "war demands nearly eliminated auto production and restricted access to key metals", referring to the Korean War. The body styles were unchanged from the previous year with the Concord available in a three-passenger business coupe, a fastback two-door sedan, or an all-metal two-door Suburban station wagon. The Concord Series was available in a simple Deluxe trim level. For the new all-metal two-door Suburban station wagon, an additional Special Savoy trim level was available. This upgrade included better upholstery, arm rests, assist straps, storage compartments, and chrome exterior window and belt line trim. The business coupe featured cargo space behind the front bench seat.

The 1952 model year included minor changes to medallions, hood ornament, and script nameplates, but after the midyear an optional electric overdrive unit (for speeds over 25 mph) was added for the manual transmission (no automatic transmission was available).

The Concord model line was dropped for 1953 and replaced by the Cambridge for the lowest trim level.

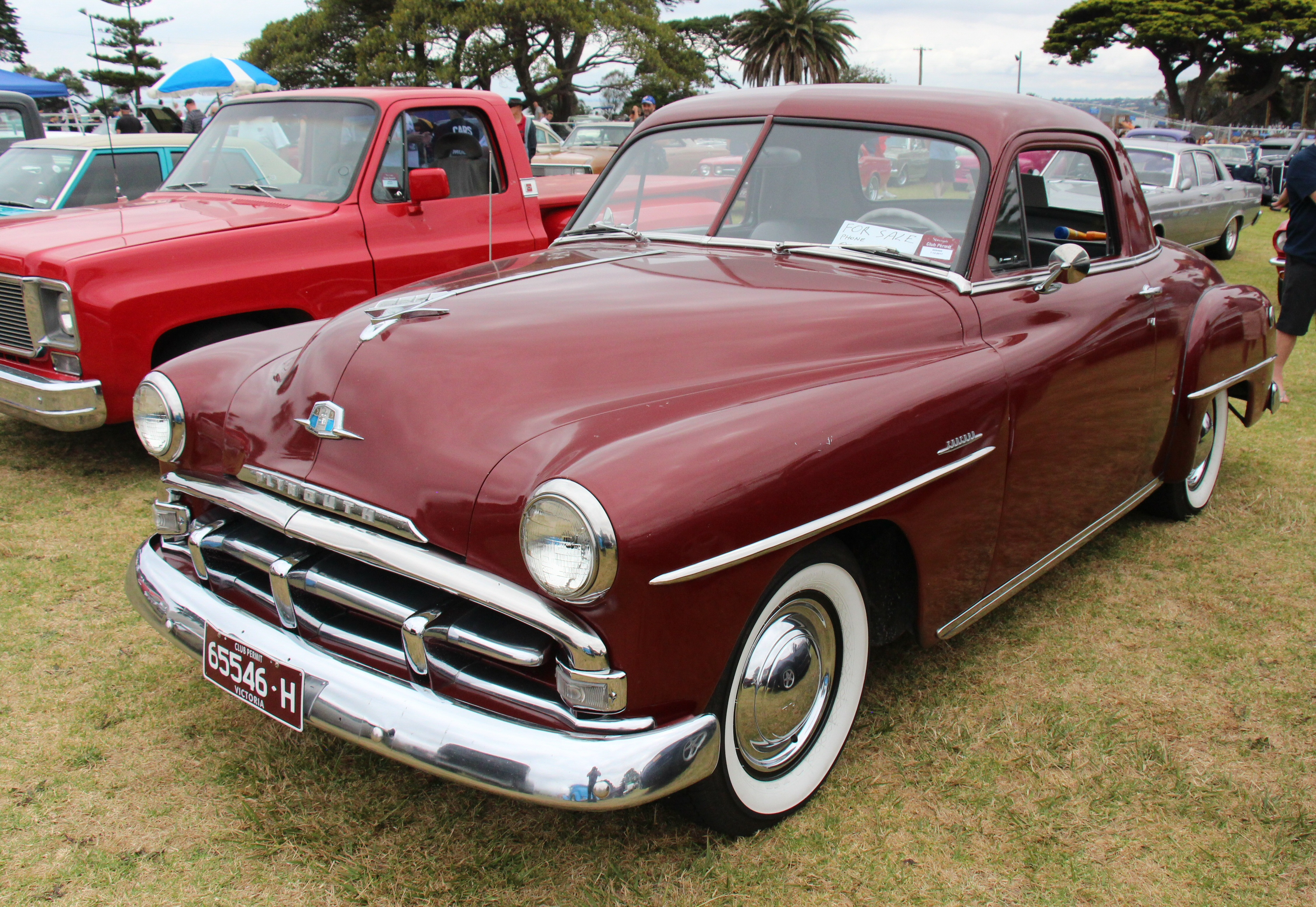
1951 Plymouth Concord Three Passenger Coupe

== Name origin ==
Plymouth, Massachusetts, was one of the first European settlements in North America and is a major city in the state. Two of Plymouth's model lines in the 1950s were named after towns in Massachusetts: Cambridge and Concord.

The name "Concord", was later used by American Motors Corporation (AMC) for its line of compact cars (see: 1978-83 AMC Concord).

The name was resurrected by the Chrysler division after it bought out AMC on its full-size cars (see: 1993-2004 Chrysler Concorde), though it was spelled "Concorde".
