= Plymouth Cranbrook =

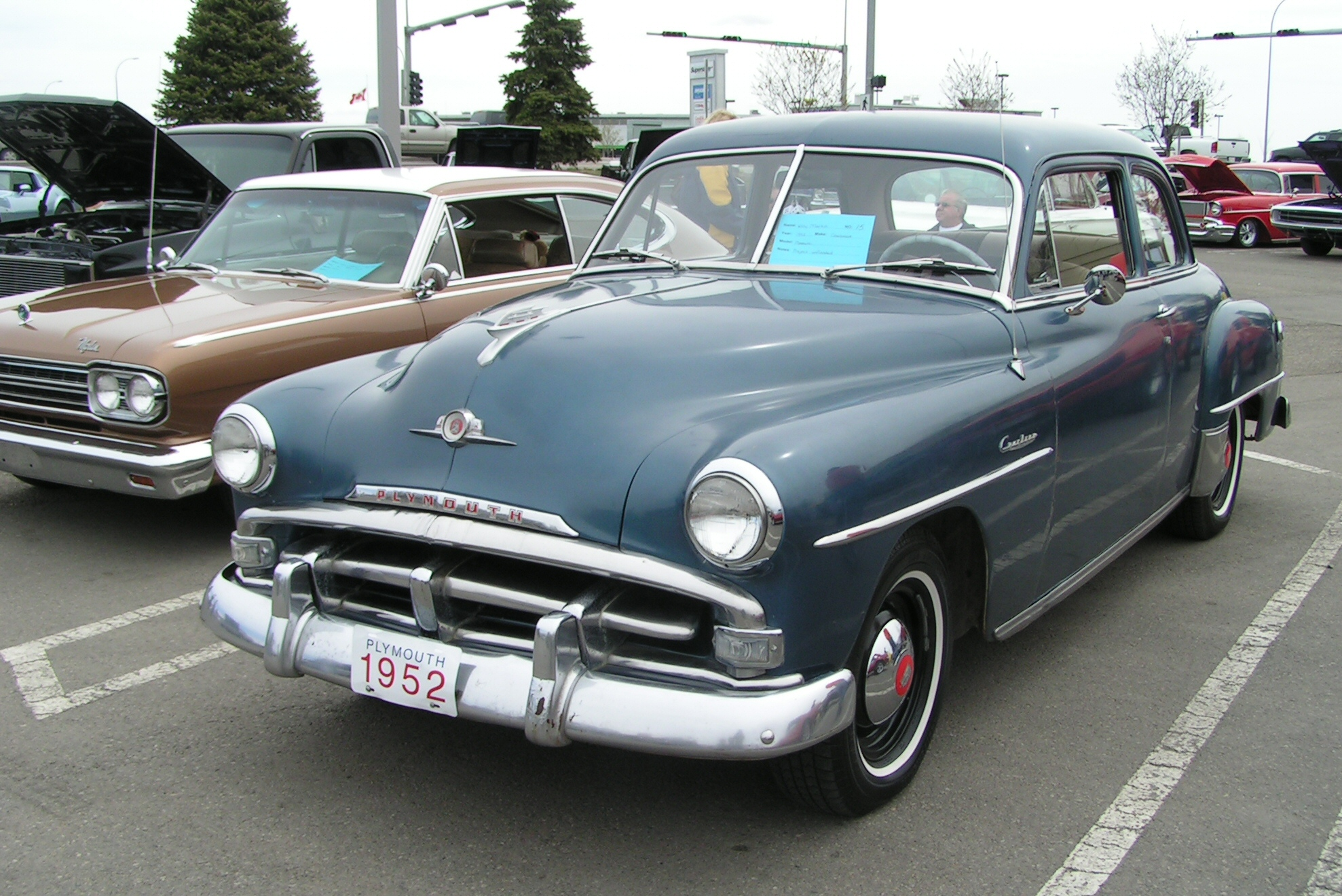
- 1952 Plymouth Cranbrook Club Coupe

Overview
- Manufacturer: Plymouth (Chrysler)
- Production: 1951–1953
- Assembly: Lynch Road Assembly, Highland Park, MI, United States; San Leandro Assembly, San Leandro, California; Adelaide Assembly, South Australia

Body and chassis
- Class: Full-size
- Body style: 4-door sedan 2-door coupe 2-door hardtop coupe 2-door convertible 3-door wagon 2-door coupe utility (Australia)
- Related: Chrysler Windsor; DeSoto DeLuxe & Custom; Dodge Coronet; Dodge Meadowbrook; Plymouth Cambridge; Plymouth Concord

Powertrain
- Engine: 217.8 cu in (3.6 L) Plymouth Flathead Straight six
- Transmission: 3-speed manual standard(1951-1953), "Hy-Drive" semi-automatic Automatic with Overdrive

Dimensions
- Wheelbase: 1951-52: 111 in (2,819 mm); 118.5 in (3,010 mm); 1953: 114 in (2,896 mm)
- Length: 1951-52: 193.875 in (4,924 mm); 1953: 189.125 in (4,804 mm)
- Width: 72.8" (1951), 73.4" (1953)
- Curb weight: 3,200–3,400 lb (1,451–1,542 kg)

Chronology
- Predecessor: Plymouth Special Deluxe
- Successor: Plymouth Savoy; Plymouth Belvedere (higher trim)

The Plymouth Cranbrook is an automobile which was built by Plymouth for the model years 1951 through 1953. It replaced the Special Deluxe when Plymouth changed its naming scheme and was essentially the same as the Plymouth Concord and Cambridge. In period TV commercials, the cars were all introduced as "the new Plymouth" and then followed by the model year; the ads made no mention of the nameplate, which merely indicated a trim package with standard and optional features. The Cranbrook model name was, however, featured in contemporary sales brochures.

== Name origin ==
The name Cranbrook may have been taken from a city in British Columbia, but it may also have been taken from Cranbrook Drive in Detroit; this small street intersected with Cambridge Avenue. Both streets are between 7 Mile Road West and 8 Mile Road West, near the Dodge Main plant. Concord Street ran by the plant. This indicates that the cars may have been named after streets near Chrysler Corporation facilities.

Plymouth, Massachusetts, was one of the first European settlements in North America and is a major city in the state. Two of Plymouth's model lines in the 1950s were named after towns in Massachusetts: Cambridge and Concord.

== Series P-23 ==
The Plymouth Cranbrook was conservatively styled, designed to fit K. T. Keller's notion that cars be practical and allow drivers to sit upright while wearing a hat; by the time it was sold, competitors favored the low and sleek look. Differences between the 1950 Special Deluxe and the 1951 Plymouth Cranbrook are relatively few in number and scope, with interchangeable glass and doors, but different rubber seals; lack of woodgrain on the instrument panel; plastic brake handle instead of chrome; and other similar changes. More substantial was having what had been the hood release handle function as the overdrive control. Fender lettering and other badging necessarily changed as well. From a distance, the cars were essentially similar.

The Plymouth Cambridge and Plymouth Cranbrook models shared the P-23 Series Number in both 1951 and 1952. The six-cylinder flathead engine produced 97 hp (72 kW).

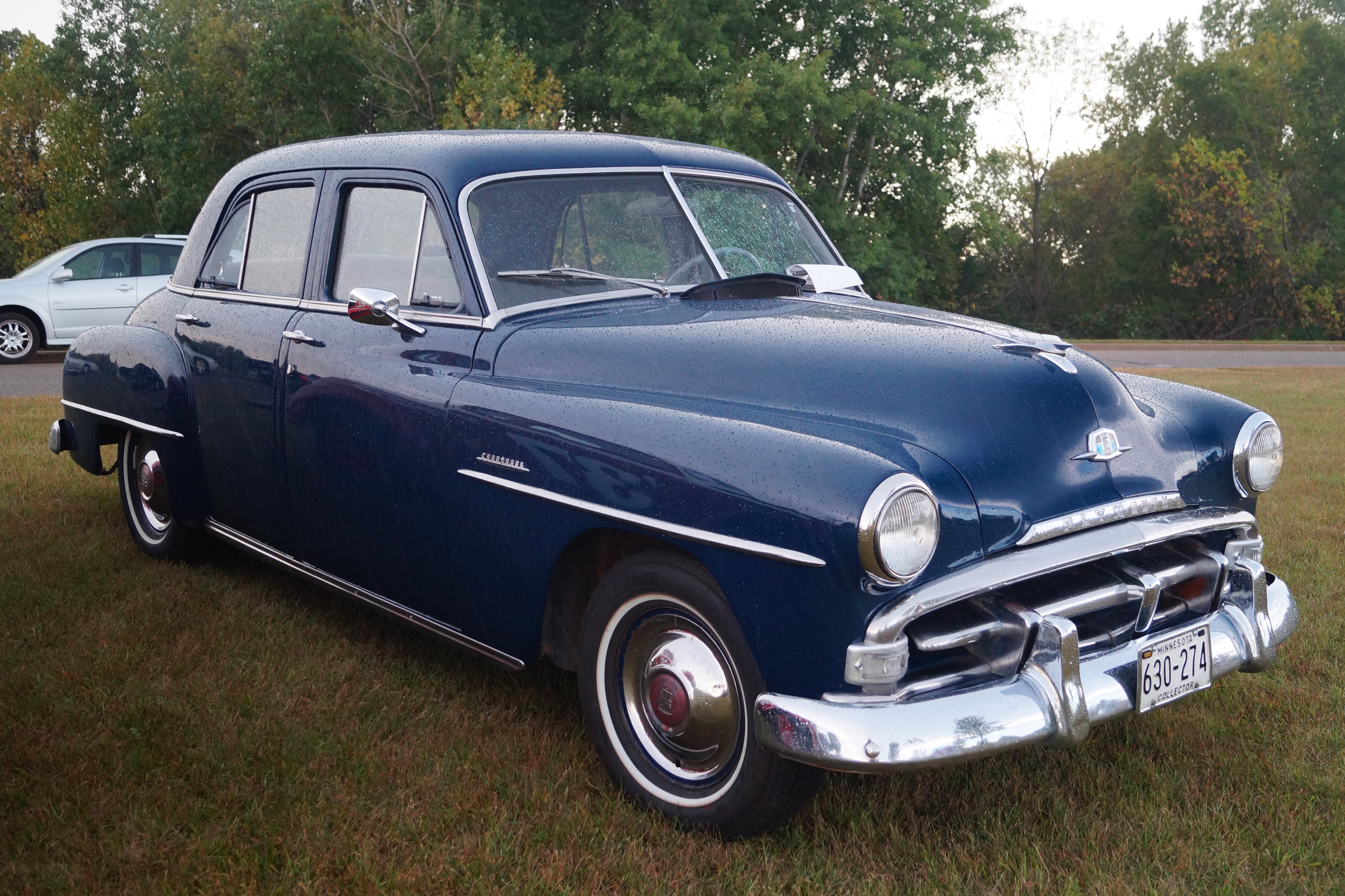
1951 Plymouth Cranbrook Four Door Sedan

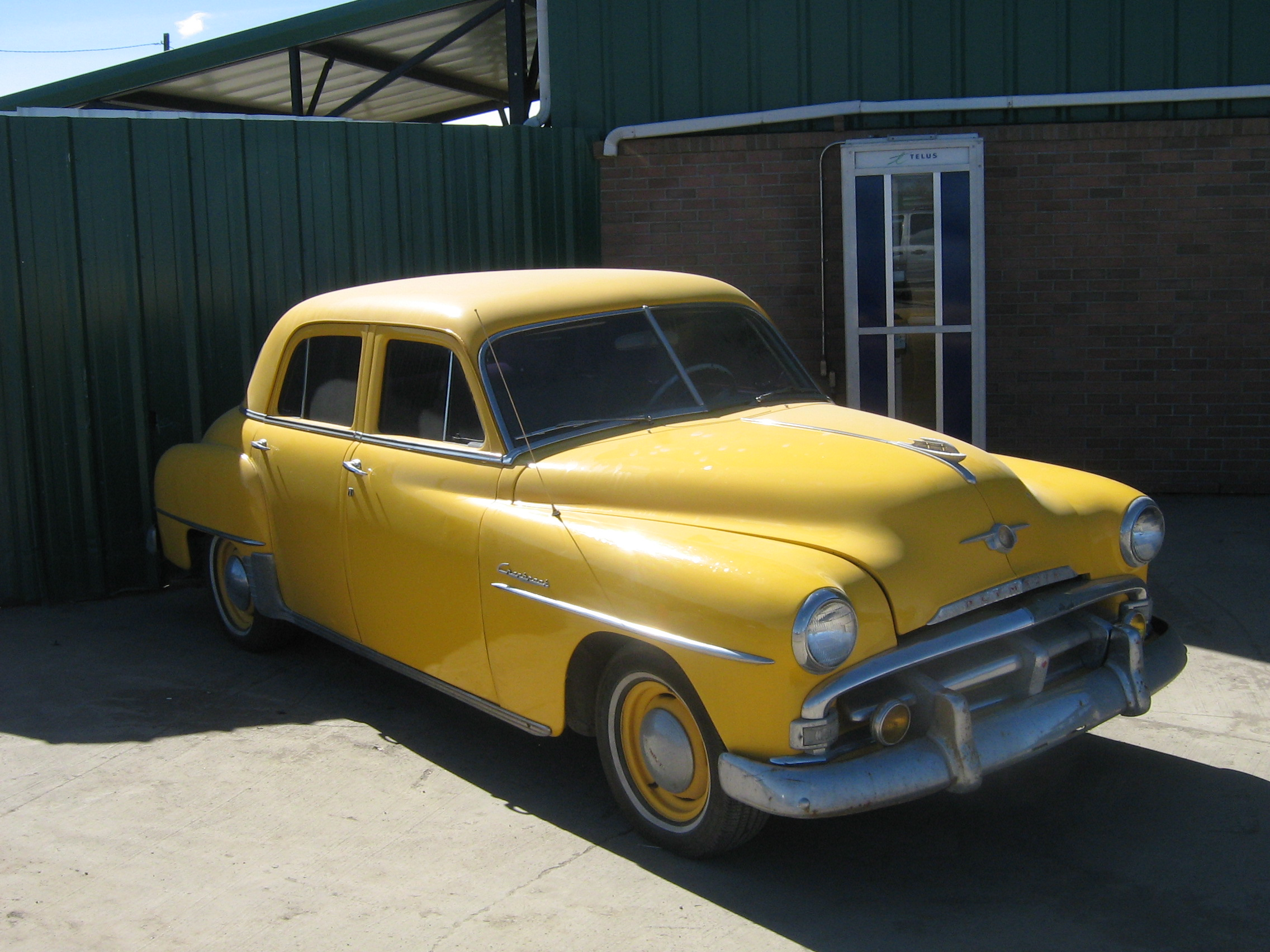
1952 Plymouth Cranbrook Four Door Sedan

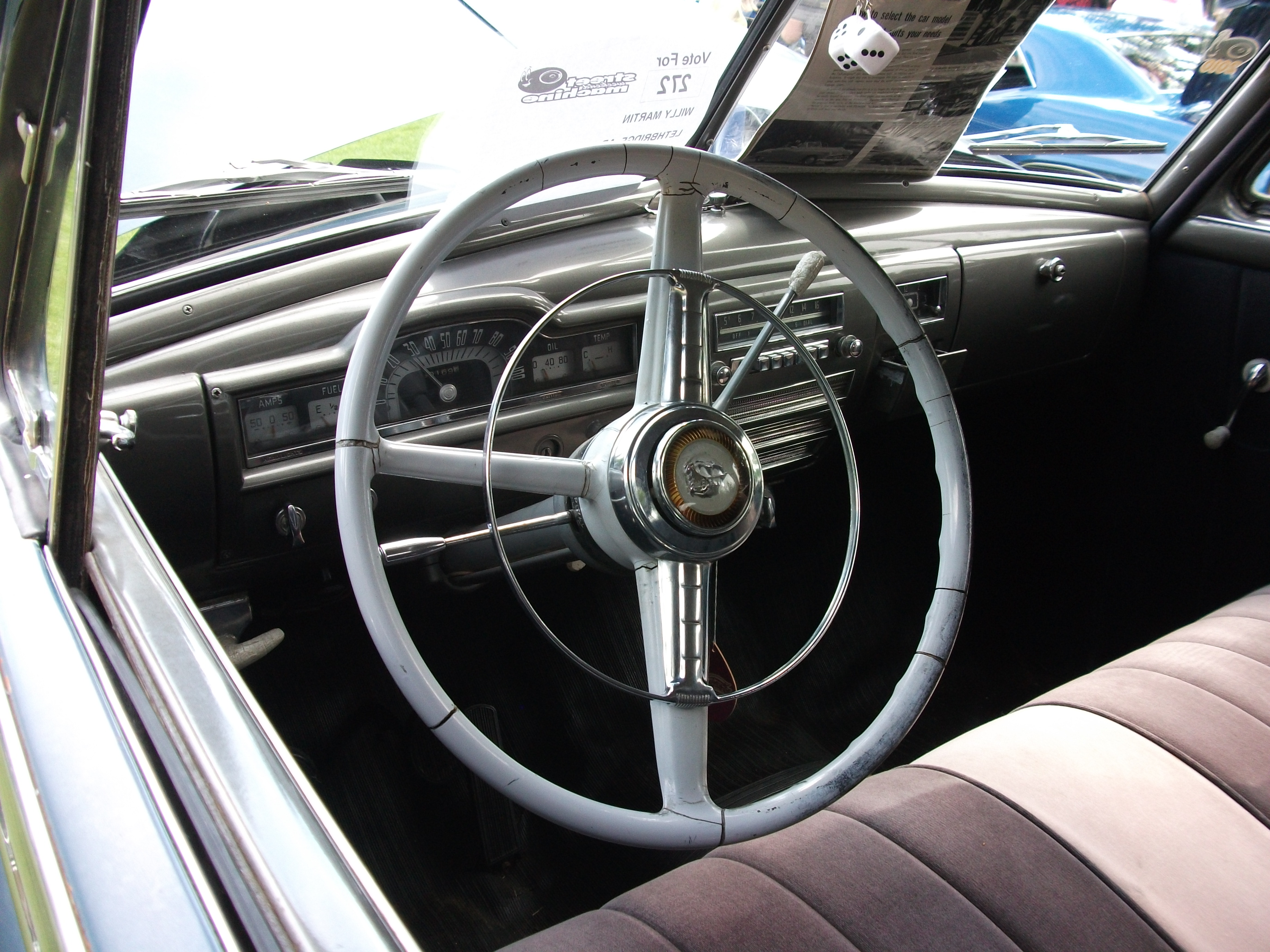
1952 Plymouth Cranbrook interior

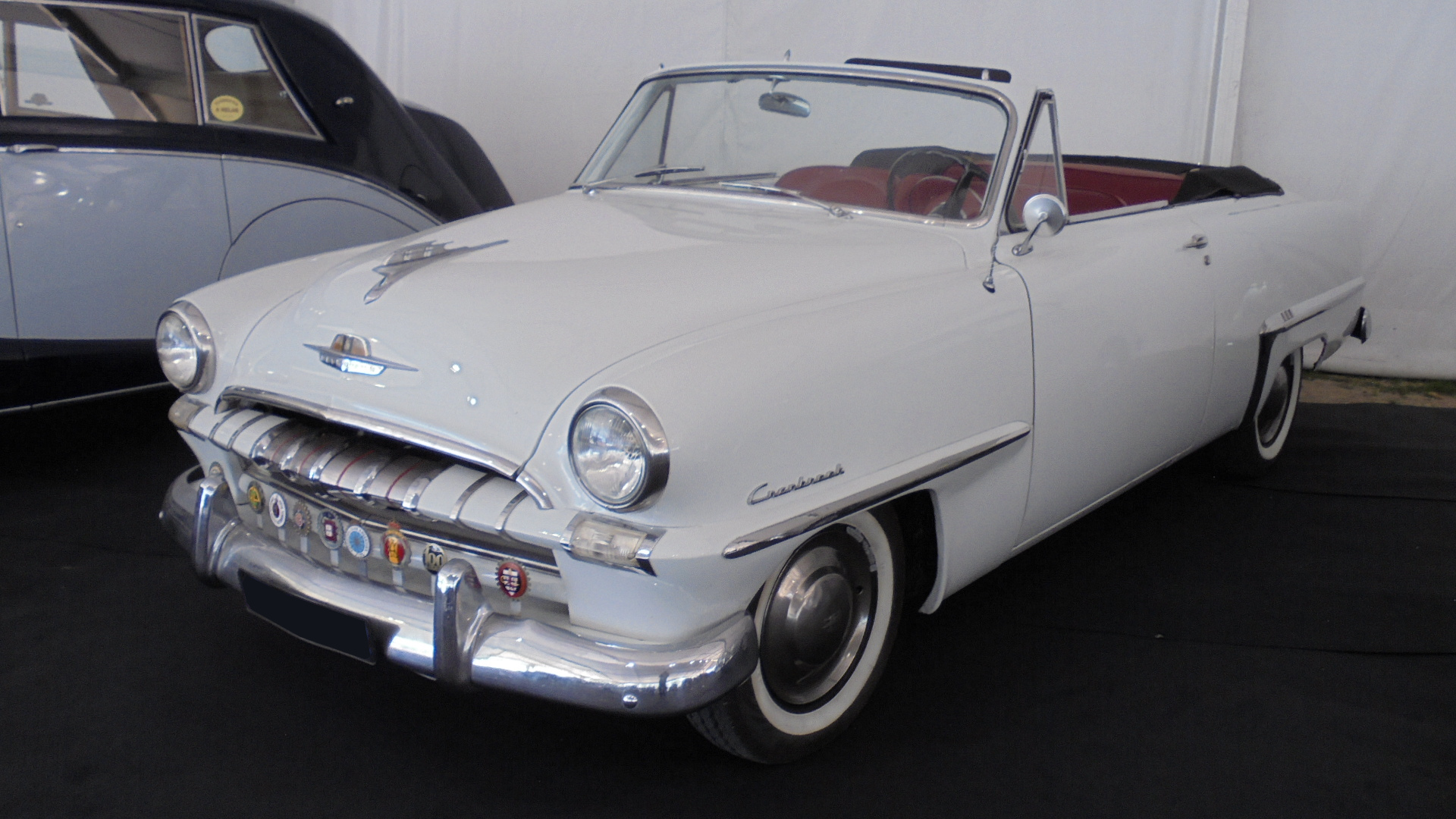
1953 Plymouth Cranbrook Convertible Club Coupe

For 1953, the boxy shape was changed for straighter lines, with sleeker and more modern styling. The windshield went to a modern one-piece unit; and the door handles pulled out instead of twisting. The glove box was moved to the center for easier access by the driver. The gas cap was moved to under the trunk lid, resulting in initial problems with gas spilling out of a full tank into the trunk; this problem was resolved with baffles in mid-1953.

The three-window coupe and fastback sedan were dropped for 1953; the former long and short wheelbase models were consolidated with a common wheelbase of 114 inches (2,900 mm), only one inch shorter than those of Chevrolet and Ford (although considerably less overhang than those competitors gave the Cranbrook a "shorter" look.) Power increased marginally, to 100 hp (75 kW).

The 1953 Plymouth Cranbrook was designated Series P-24-2 and the lower trim level Cambridge was the P-24-1.

In 1954, the Cranbrook name was replaced by the Belvedere, which had been the top trim level of the Cranbrook; all Plymouth names were switched to those of upscale hotels.

== Australian production ==
The Plymouth P-23 series was also produced in Australia and was marketed under the Cranbrook name. 4,382 examples were built in the years 1951 to 1953.

The Plymouth P-24 series, which was marketed in the U.S. as the 1953 Plymouth, was also assembled in Australia in that year by Chrysler Australia. As in the U.S., it was sold as the Plymouth Cambridge and Cranbrook.

In 1954 assembly of the P-25 series commenced, with Plymouth Cambridge, Cranbrook, Savoy and Belvedere names used. Australian design input was minimal, although major body panels were locally produced. From 1956 a coupe utility variant was offered in addition to the four door sedan and was available in Cranbrook, Savoy and Belvedere models. Australian production of the P-25 continued through to 1957. The closely related Australian produced Chrysler Royal was built as the replacement for the local market.

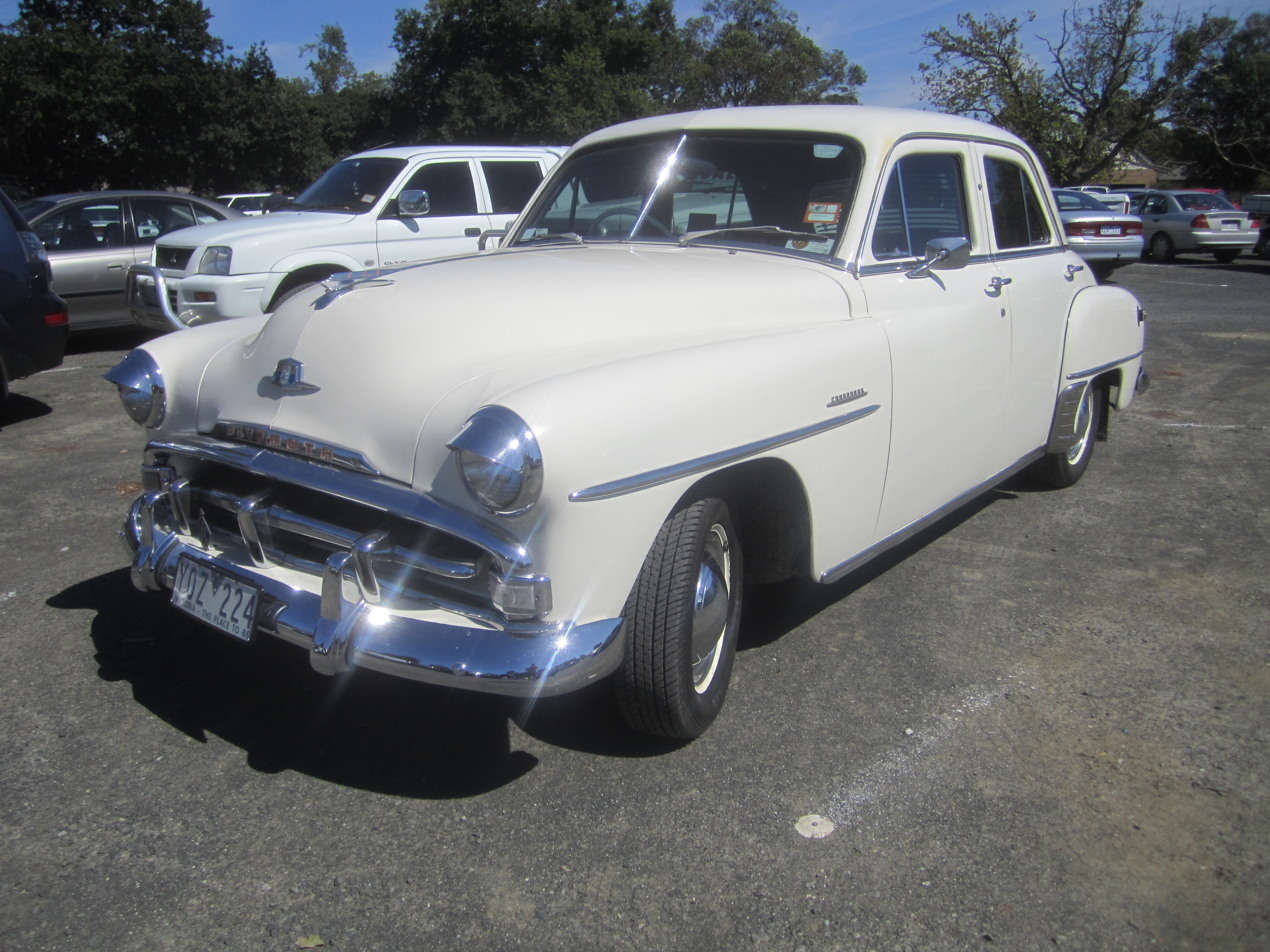
Australian P-23 Series Plymouth Cranbrook Sedan of 1951

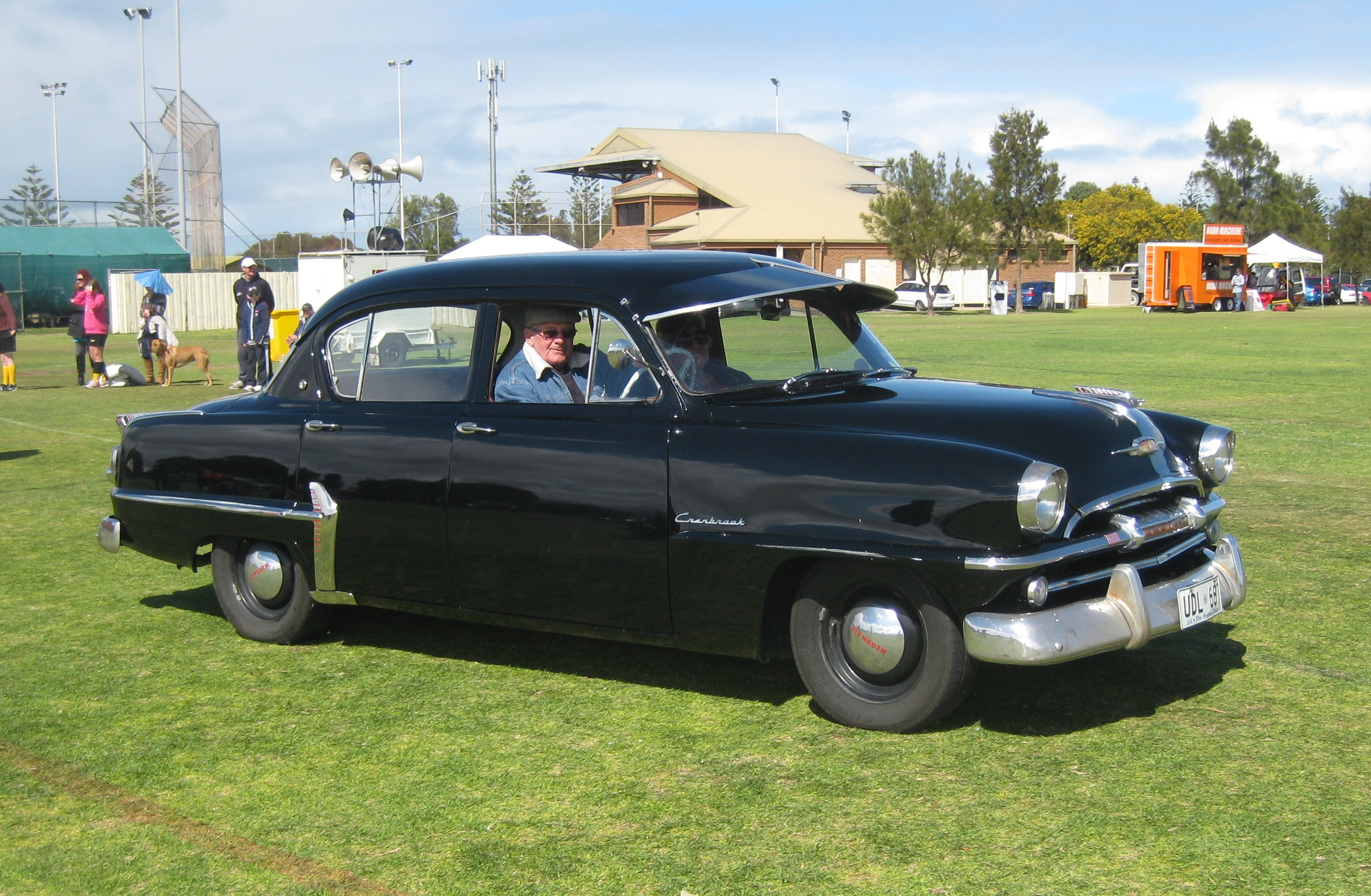
Australian P-25 Series Plymouth Cranbrook Sedan
