= Chrysler Royal (Australia) =

Chrysler Royal Chrysler Plainsman Chrysler Wayfarer
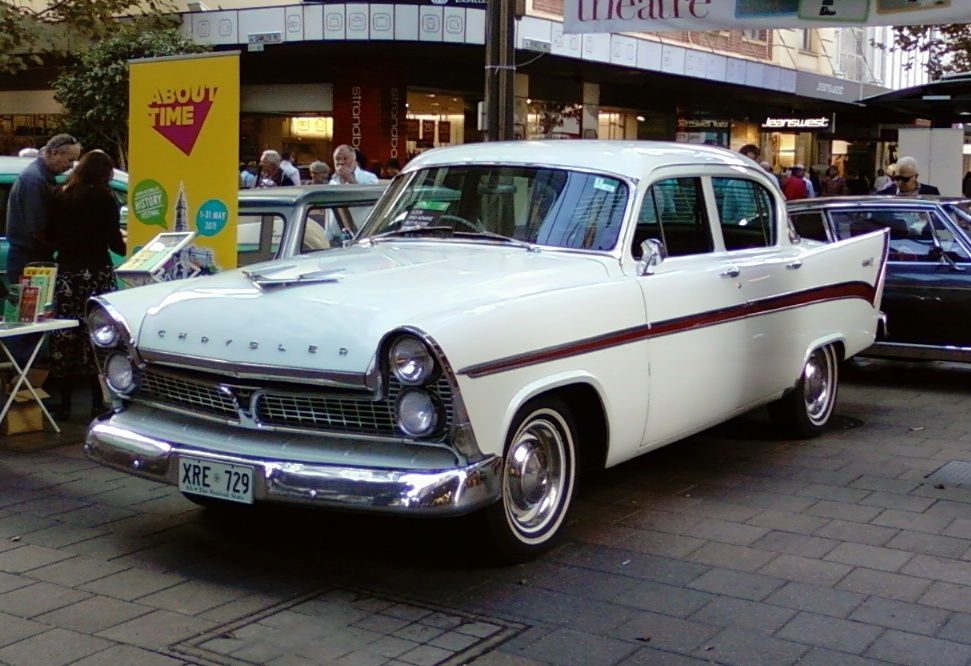
- Chrysler AP3 Royal

Overview
- Manufacturer: Chrysler Australia
- Production: 1957–1963
- Assembly: Australia: Mile End, South Australia

Body and chassis
- Class: Full-size
- Body style: Chrysler Royal 4-door sedan Chrysler Plainsman 5-door station wagon Chrysler Wayfarer 2-door coupe utility

Powertrain
- Engine: 230 cu in (3.8 L) PD I6; 250 cu in (4.1 L) CD I6; 313 cu in (5.1 L) A V8

Dimensions
- Wheelbase: 115 in (2,900 mm)
- Length: 199.7 in (5,070 mm)
- Width: 73.25 in (1,861 mm)
- Height: 63.5 in (1,610 mm)
- Curb weight: 3,500 lb (1,588 kg)

Chronology
- Predecessor: Plymouth Cambridge; Plymouth Cranbrook
- Successor: Chrysler Valiant

The Chrysler Royal is an automobile which was produced by Chrysler Australia from 1957 to 1963. After investing in tooling to stamp body panels for the 1954 P25 series Plymouth locally, and with Chrysler headquarters in Detroit unwilling to assist in the costs of retooling for the new US models, Chrysler Australia made the decision to develop their own range, using as much of the existing tooling as possible, whilst also realising that the new car had to appear as different as possible. The doors and basic structure of the P25 sedan was retained, and with input from Australian and American Chrysler designers, the 1955 US Plymouth front sheetmetal was adapted to the P25 body and the rear quarter panels redesigned. They also added a wraparound rear windscreen, which caused development problems with Pilkington Glass, the Australian suppliers, who struggled to get the correct curved shape.

The Chrysler Royal was only offered as a 4-door sedan however station wagon and coupe utility variants were also developed and marketed as the Chrysler Plainsman and the Chrysler Wayfarer respectively.

== AP1 (1957–1958) ==
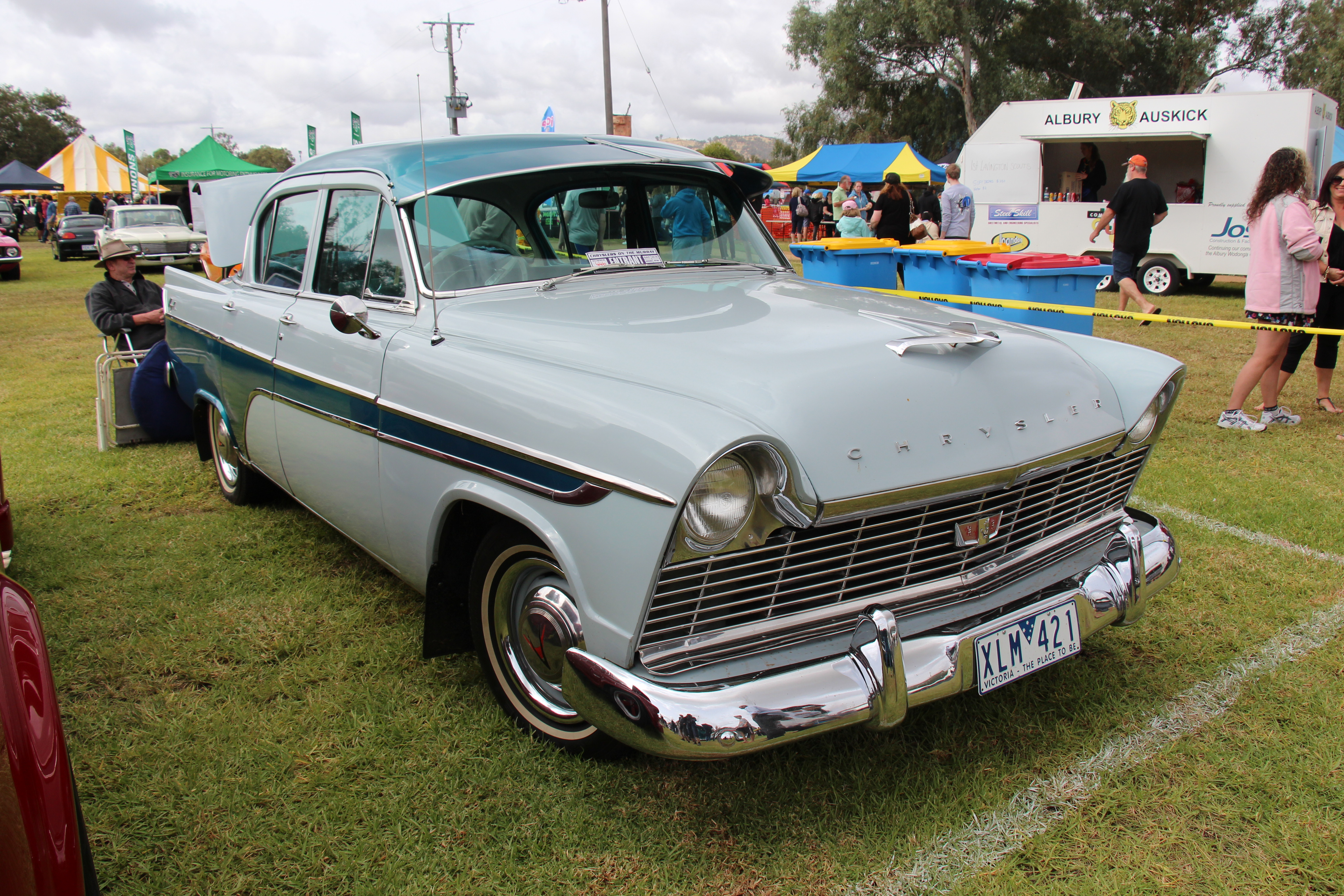
Chrysler AP1 Royal

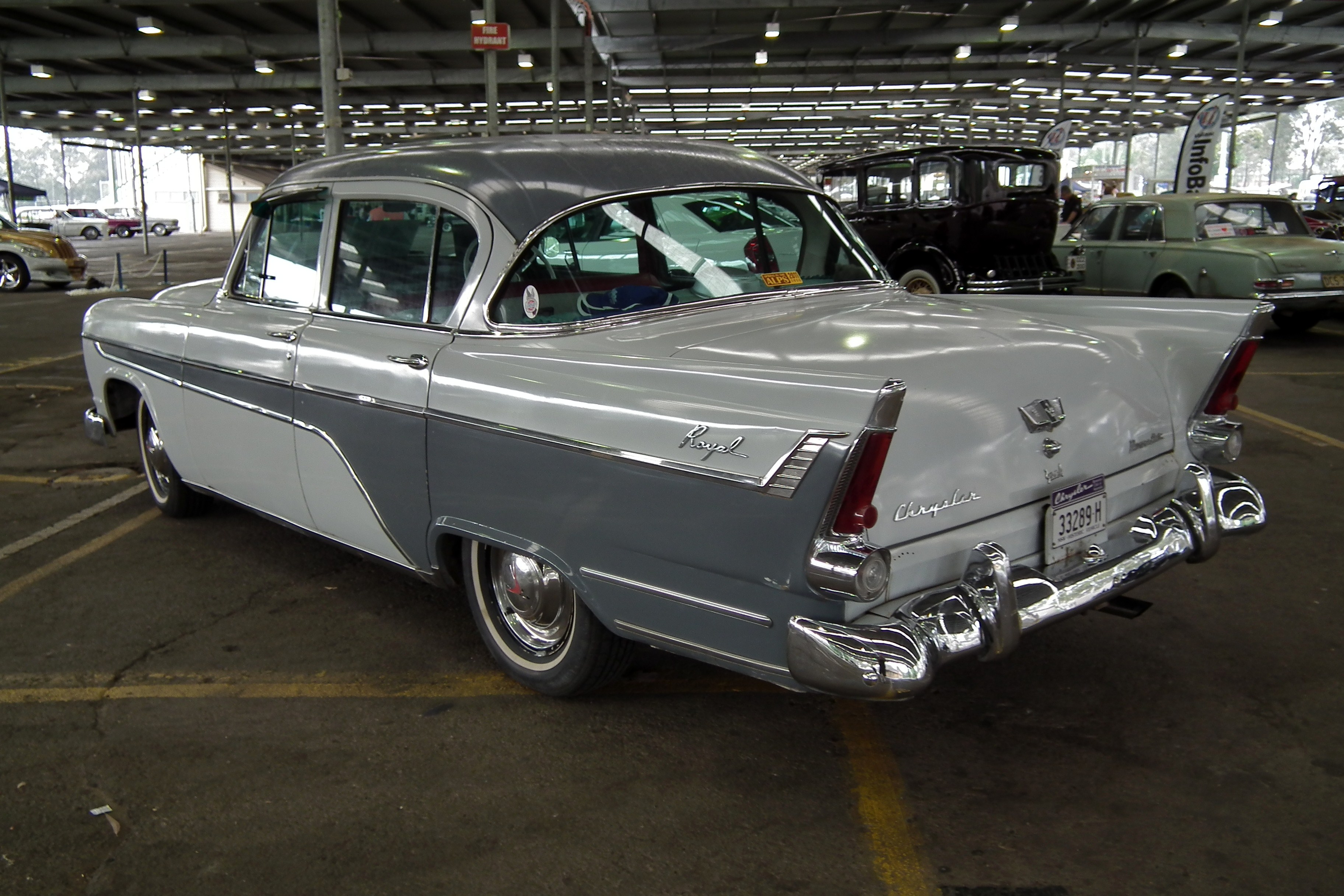
Chrysler AP1 Royal

The first version of the Chrysler Royal, the AP1, was introduced in May 1957. It was a development of the American Plymouth P25 design of 1954 which had itself been produced by Chrysler Australia as the P25 Plymouth Cambridge and Cranbrook, the D49 Dodge Kingsway and the SP25 De Soto Diplomat. Original designations for the three different designs were AD1 for the Dodge, AS1 for the DeSoto and AP1 for the Plymouth. Plans to market the updated version under these three names were dropped late in the development program and the new model would be sold only as the Chrysler Royal thus revising a name used by Chrysler in the US market from 1937 to 1950. The design chosen for the final model was that proposed for the Plymouth variant, thus the AP (Australian Plymouth) designation was adopted, and changed to stand for Australian Production. The Royal differed from the P25 in using front and rear mudguards similar to those on the 1956 US Plymouth and a rear window which was larger than that of the P25. The AP1 was originally only produced as a Royal four-door sedan; the Plainsman four-door station wagon was introduced during 1958.

The AP1 was offered with two versions of Chrysler's valve-in-block straight-6 engine: a 115-horsepower (86 kW), 230.2 cu in (3.8 L) with manual transmission and a 117-horsepower (87 kW) 250.6 cu in (4.1 L) with the Powerflite 2-speed automatic. Chrysler's 313 cu in (5.1 L) polyspherical-head V8 was introduced as an option during the AP1 model run. V8 powered Royals were popular with the South Australia Police, where they were employed as Highway Patrol cars. It was also offered in the Plainsman station wagon, although only 32 cars were thus equipped.

== AP2 (1958–1960) ==
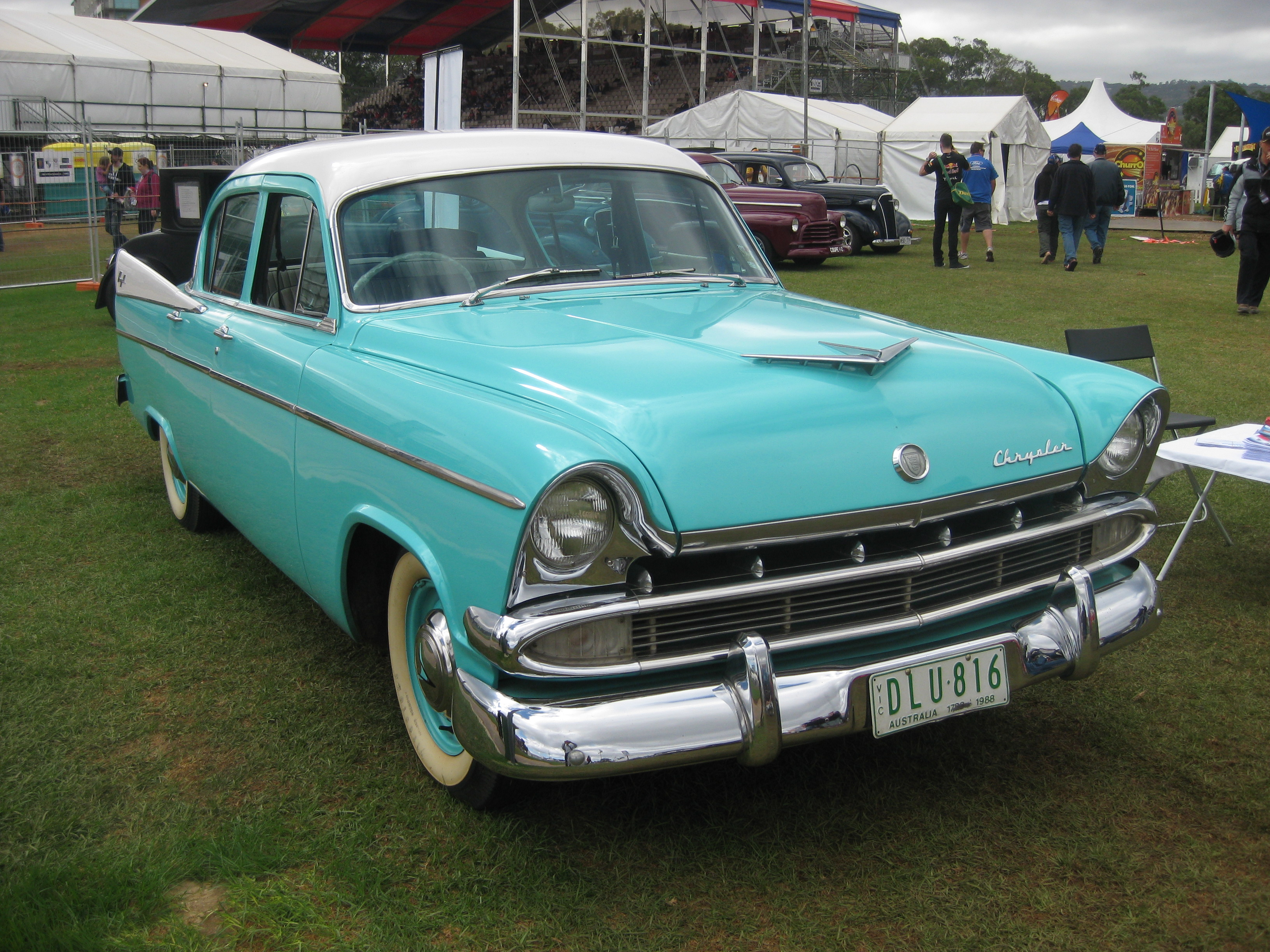
Chrysler AP2 Royal

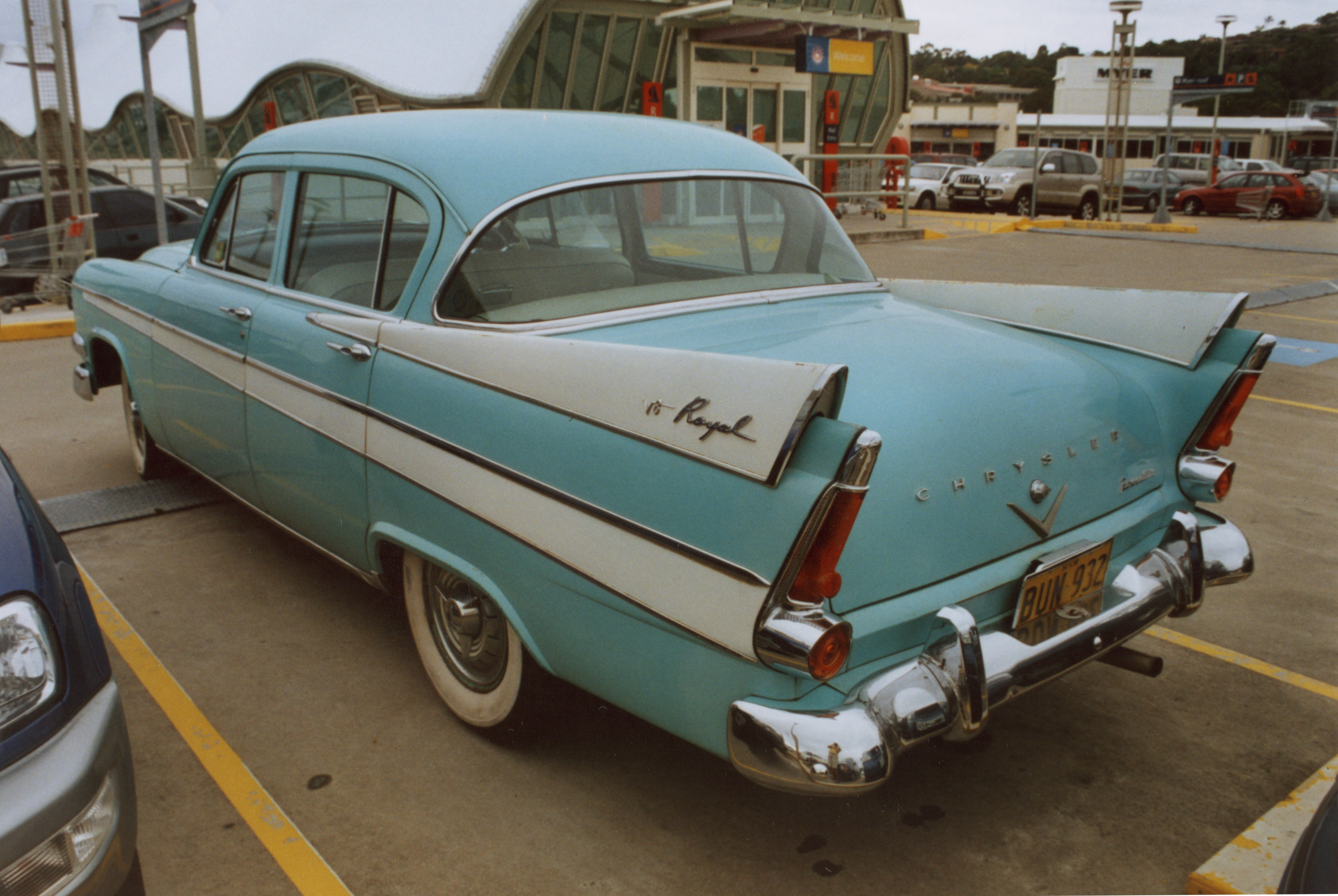
Chrysler AP2 Royal

A revised Royal, the AP2 was introduced in late 1958. This series featured a new grille and unusual rear styling with additional "saddle fins" grafted on to the existing tailfins. The AP2 was available as a Royal four-door sedan, a Plainsman four-door station wagon, and the new Wayfarer two-door coupé utility. The unrelated Dodge Wayfarer lent its name to this version. The Plainsman station wagon was dropped from the range during the AP2 series. The choice of six-cylinder and V8 engines continued, with the V8 identified by a V-shaped emblem in the grille and a small V8 badge on the rear quarter.

== AP3 (1960–1963) ==
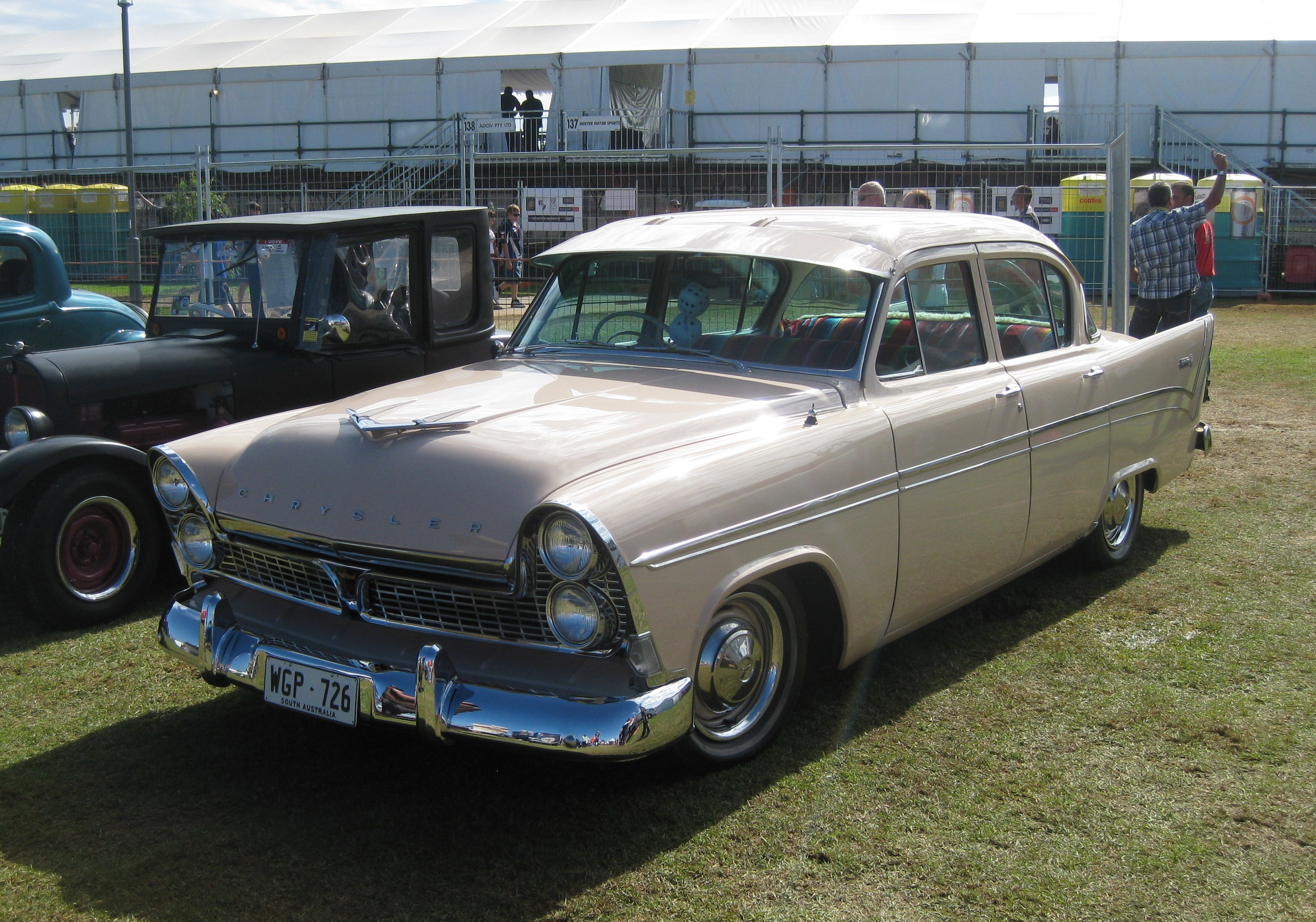
Chrysler AP3 Royal

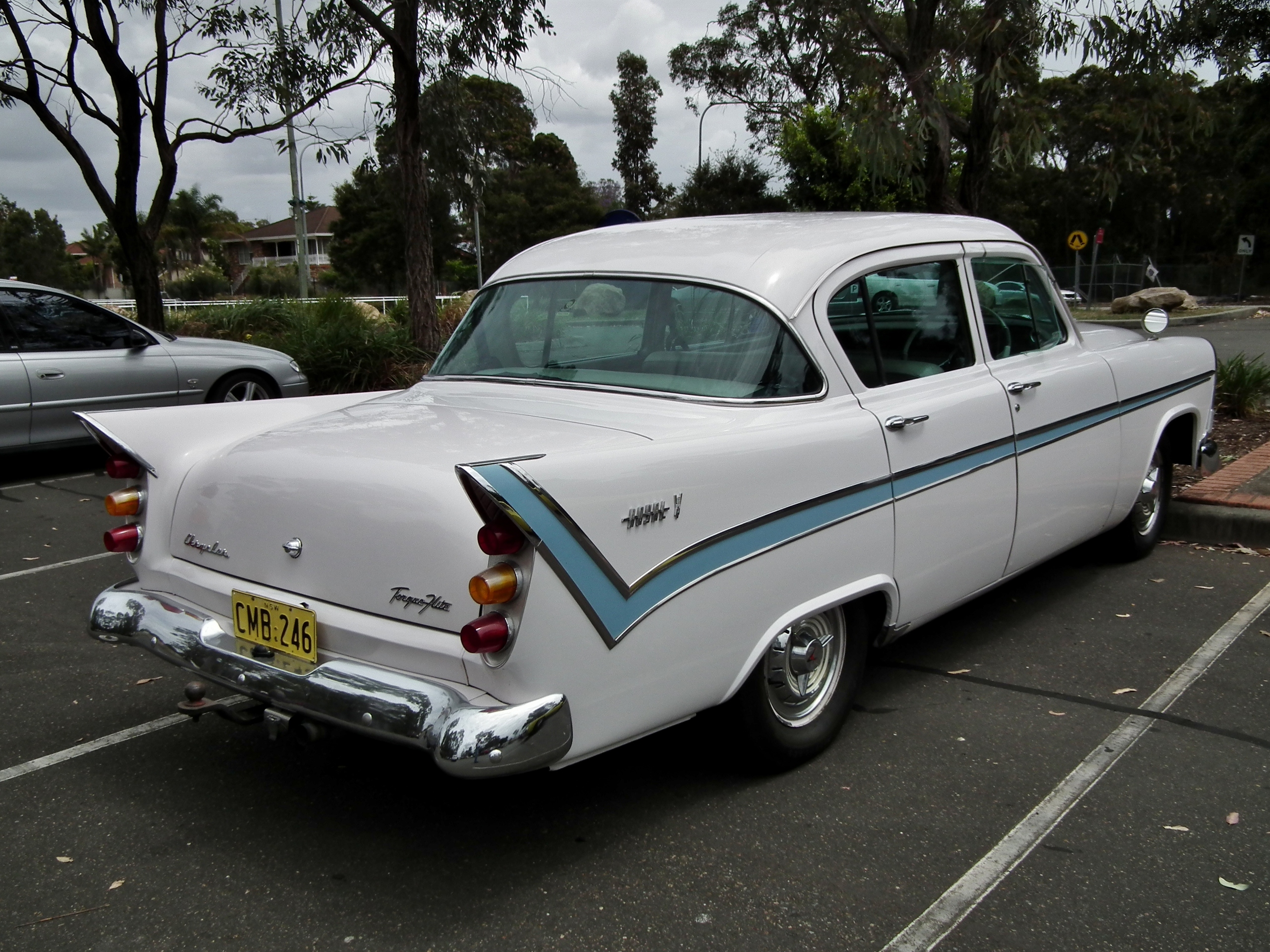
Chrysler AP3 Royal

The final version of the Royal was the AP3 which was introduced during 1960. The new series was easily distinguished from its predecessors by its vertically stacked quad headlamps and triple tail lights similar to those of the 1959 US Desoto models. A new pressing for the roof panel was also used. Chrysler's 3-speed Torqueflite automatic transmission replaced the 2-speed PowerFlite automatic of the AP2. Production ceased in 1964. The AP3 was available as a Royal four-door sedan and a Wayfarer two-door coupé utility. The choice of six cylinder and V8 engines continued, with the V8 identified by twin side trim strips (the six cylinders having only one side trim strip) and a small V8 badge on the rear quarter.

== Chrysler Plainsman & Wayfarer ==
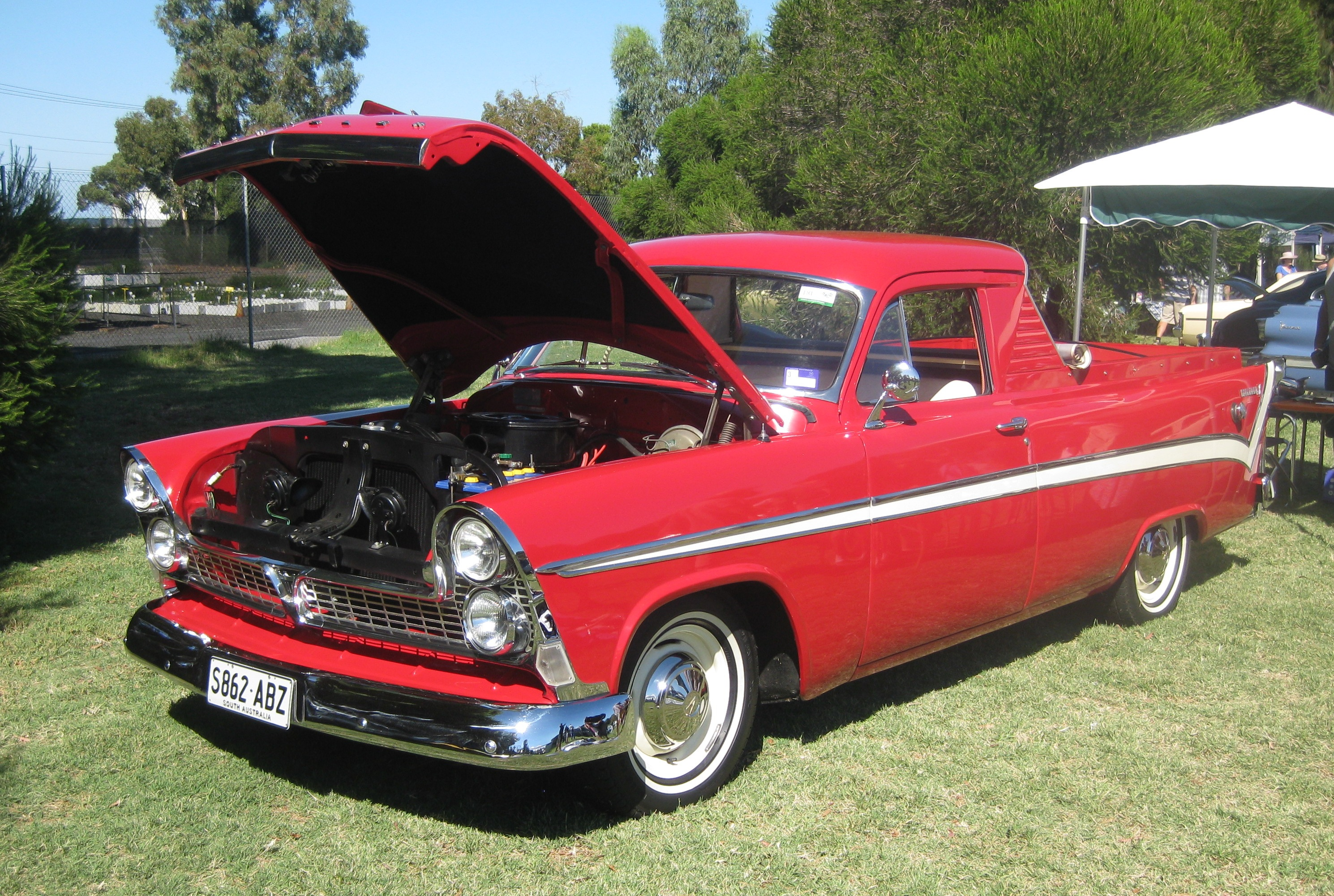
Chrysler AP3 Wayfarer

In addition to the Royal sedan, Chrysler Australia also produced the following Royal based derivatives:

- Chrysler Plainsman Station Wagon (AP1 and AP2), 224 built from 1958 to 1960
- Chrysler Wayfarer 1/2-ton coupé utility (AP2 and AP3), 1,205 built from 1958 to 1961
- Chrysler Royal chassis/cowl were produced to allow for custom bodywork to be fitted, for example ambulance/hearse

The Plainsman and Wayfarer models were not marketed under the Royal name.

== Specialised bodies ==
All three series of Royals were very popular with ambulance services throughout Australia with many ambulance services basing their fleet on the Royal chassis. The Victorian Civil Ambulance Service in Melbourne is one such service that employed vast numbers of Royals as did many country areas in Victoria. Royal ambulances were also used throughout New South Wales, Queensland, South Australia and Tasmania. Various coachbuilders were contracted to transform Royals into ambulances, using different specifications depending on District requirements. Some vehicles used hand formed steel bodywork over timber frames, others used newly developed fibreglass technology. In 1957 Commonwealth Engineering (ComEng) began development of the first fibreglass ambulance body in Australia, in conjunction with the Central District Ambulance in Sydney. The first vehicle was completed in June 1958, after Central District agreed to replace its entire fleet with fibreglass bodied Royals constructed by ComEng. The use of fibreglass bodywork provided a vehicle that was believed to be tougher, quicker to build, and easier to repair and resulted in a weight saving of around 560 pounds (254 kilograms). As well as using the available chassis/cowl configuration, ambulances were also converted from sedans, Wayfarer coupe utilities, and at least one was converted from a Plainsman station wagon. The Royal chassis was also popular with undertakers as a basis for hearse conversion.

== See also ==
- Chrysler Royal, for the US automobile of the same name.
