= Chrysler Royal =

Series CD/CP/CT/C-16/C-18/C-22/Series 25/Series 28/Series C-34
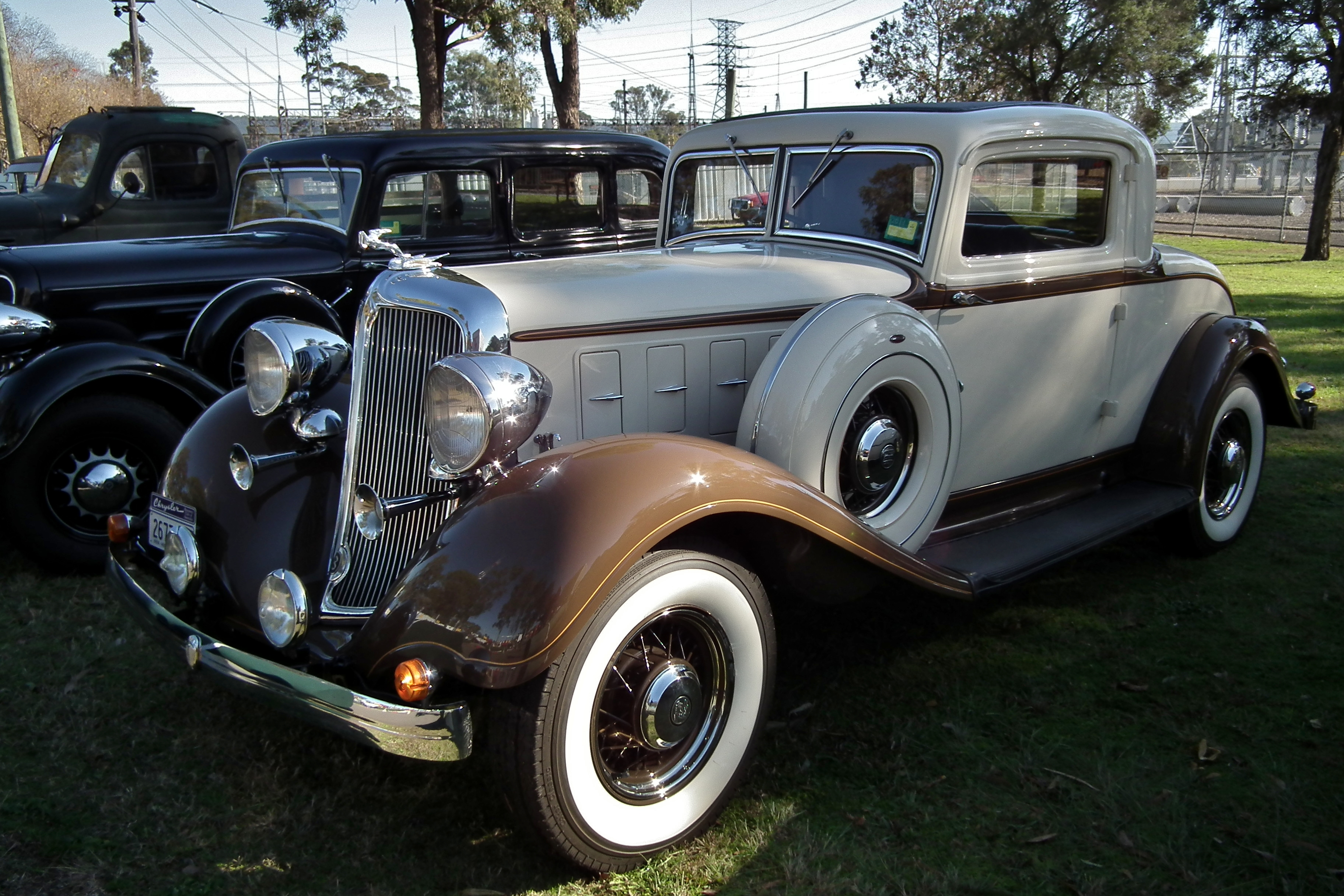
- 1933 Chrysler Royal Eight Series CT Roadster Coupe

Overview
- Manufacturer: Chrysler Corporation
- Model years: 1931–1932 (CD, CP); 1933–1934; 1937–1950
- Assembly: Jefferson Avenue Assembly; Detroit, Michigan, United States

Body and chassis
- Class: Full-size car
- Body style: 4-door sedan 2-door coupe 2-door convertible
- Layout: Rear-wheel-drive
- Related: Chrysler Imperial; Chrysler Windsor; Chrysler Airflow; DeSoto S-Series

Powertrain
- Engine: 240.33 cu in (3.9 L) Chrysler I8 (1931); 273.8 cu in (4.5 L) Chrysler I8 (1933); 298.65 cu in (4.9 L) Chrysler I8 (1932); 228.1 cu in (3.7 L) Chrysler I6 (1937–1938); 241.5 cu in (4.0 L) Chrysler I6 (1939–1942)

Dimensions
- Wheelbase: 120 in (3,048 mm) (1933 Series CT); 124 in (3,150 mm) (1931–1932 Series CD & CP); 128 in (3,251 mm) (1933 Series CT LWB); 116 in (2,946 mm) (1937 C-16); 133 in (3,378 mm) (1937 C-16 LWB); 119 in (3,023 mm) (1938–1939 C-16 & C-22); 136 in (3,454 mm) (1938–1939 C-16 & C-22 LWB); 122 in (3,099 mm) (1940 C-25); 139 in (3,531 mm) (1940 C-25 LWB)

Chronology
- Predecessor: Chrysler Six
- Successor: Chrysler Airflow (1934); Chrysler Windsor (six cylinder engine); Chrysler Saratoga (eight cylinder engine)

The Chrysler Royal was a full-size car produced by the Chrysler Corporation in the United States. It was first released in 1933 and continued being built until 1934. Then, the model ended production and did not return until 1937, and then continued until 1950.

== Chrysler Eight ==
For production year 1931, Chrysler introduced their first straight eight engine for the Chrysler Imperial, and offered it in the Chrysler Eight Series CD. It borrowed appearance influences from the Cord L-29. The engine used had a 240.33 cu in (3.9 L) displacement that was smaller than the one used in the Imperial Series CG, followed in 1932 with the Chrysler Series CP and an upgraded 298.65 cu in (4.9 L) engine, while both Eights used a 124 in (3,150 mm) wheelbase. The Chrysler Eight offered sweeping fenders, rear suicide doors, dual windshield wipers, dual taillights and dual chrome trumpet horns, sharing an appearance with the 1931 Chrysler Imperial Series CG, and was available with five different two-door body style choices that could accommodate between two through five passengers, and three four-door coachwork choices were offered, to include a sedan convertible and two versions of the Royal Sedan in Standard and Special trim packages. Prices ranged from US$1,495 ($31,650 in 2025 dollars) for the two-door Sport Roadster to US$1,970 ($41,706 in 2025 dollars) for the four-door Dual Cowl Phaeton. A stripped-down Chrysler Eight Series CD Sport Roadster was entered along with an Imperial roadster in the 1931 24 Hours of Le Mans but did not finish due to radiator issues.

Large displacement engines provided the horsepower and torque clients wanted and due to the low quality of gasoline fuel at the time, and low compression ratios, 50 bhp was more than adequate. It is estimated that the rating equivalent of early gasoline available varied from 40 to 60 octane and that the "High-Test", sometimes referred to as "fighting grade", probably averaged 50 to 65 octane.

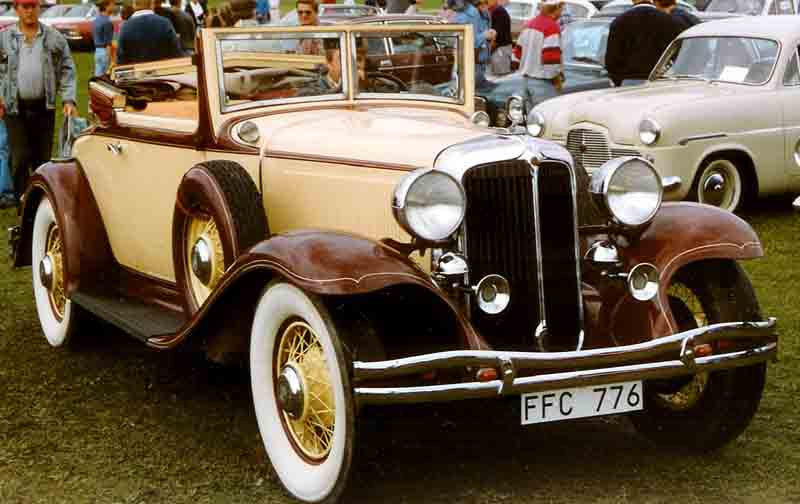
1931 Chrysler Eight Series CD Convertible

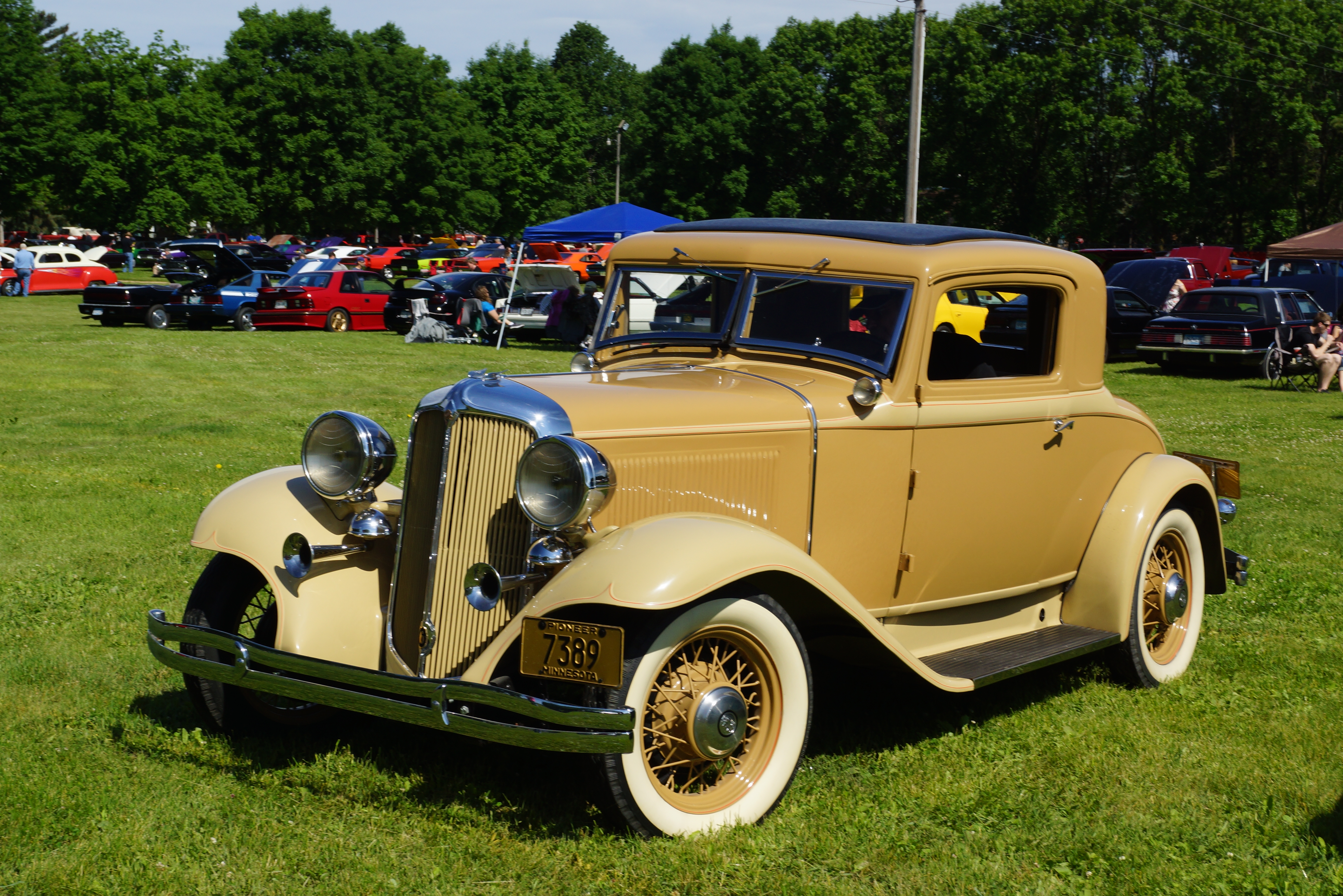
1932 Chrysler Eight Series CP Coupe

== Chrysler Royal (eight cylinder engine) ==
The Chrysler Royal is a full-size car that was produced by Chrysler. The "Royal" nameplate was added to the 1932 Chrysler Eight Series CP and appeared in 1933 as the Chrysler Royal Series CT and was previously used to describe a top level trim package on sedans. The Royal was originally installed with the Chrysler Straight Eight, and it was the second Chrysler to use a nameplate that didn't refer to a "Series" designation that referred to an internal body code or the speed it was capable of in past products. The first Chrysler product to do so was the Imperial, which it originally shared a shortened chassis. The Royal was offered as a two-door Business Coupe, Roadster Coupe, Convertible Coupe, a two-door, five-passenger Convertible Sedan and four-door Sedan using a shorter 120 in (3,048 mm) wheelbase from previous years. The longer 128 in (3,251 mm) wheelbase was used for the eight-passenger sedan, while the longer wheelbase was available as a cowl and chassis only for special coachwork choices from private companies, of which 95 were documented to have been built. Prices ranged from US$895 ($22,260 in 2025 dollars) for the business coupe to US$1,085 ($26,986 in 2025 dollars) for the convertible sedan, while the long wheelbase was listed at US$1,125 ($27,980 in 2025 dollars), offering the appearance of the flagship Imperial but at an affordable price.

== Chrysler Royal (six cylinder engine) ==
The "Royal" nameplate was used for one year in 1933 when the Airflow replaced the Royal in 1934, then brought back as a new model in 1937 when the Airflow sold poorly, and was sold alongside the Airflow which continued to offer the Chrysler Straight Eight. The Airflow received no direct successor. A November 1936 advertisement listed the 1937 Royal as available in ten body types, starting at US$715 ($16,589 in 2025 dollars), with the four door sedan at US$815 ($18,909 in 2025 dollars). The 1937 Royal Series C-16 was installed with the Chrysler Straight Six and took the entry-level position in the Chrysler hierarchy, while being shared with the DeSoto Airstream. In 1939 the Series C-22 Royal introduced the "Royal Windsor" nameplate as a trim package, then in 1941, the "Royal", "Windsor" and "Highlander" became separate nameplates sharing the same wheelbase but only using the Straight Six, with "Windsor" models offering more standard features and a higher standard interior over the "Royal".

1948 models built after 1 December 1948 were officially designated as First Series 1949 models.

The Royal replaced the Chrysler Six that the company originated with in 1925, and the Royal remained the 6-cylinder entry-level model for Chrysler until it was dropped at the end of 1950 model year, making the Chrysler Windsor the entry-level car for the 1951 model year. Pre-war models were offered in two wheelbase lengths, with coupes and sedans available on the shorter wheelbase, while seven-passenger sedan and limousine were offered on the longer wheelbase. While it was the most affordable Chrysler, it was still a well equipped car with luxurious attention to detail as it was above DeSoto Custom, Dodge Custom and Plymouth De Luxe.

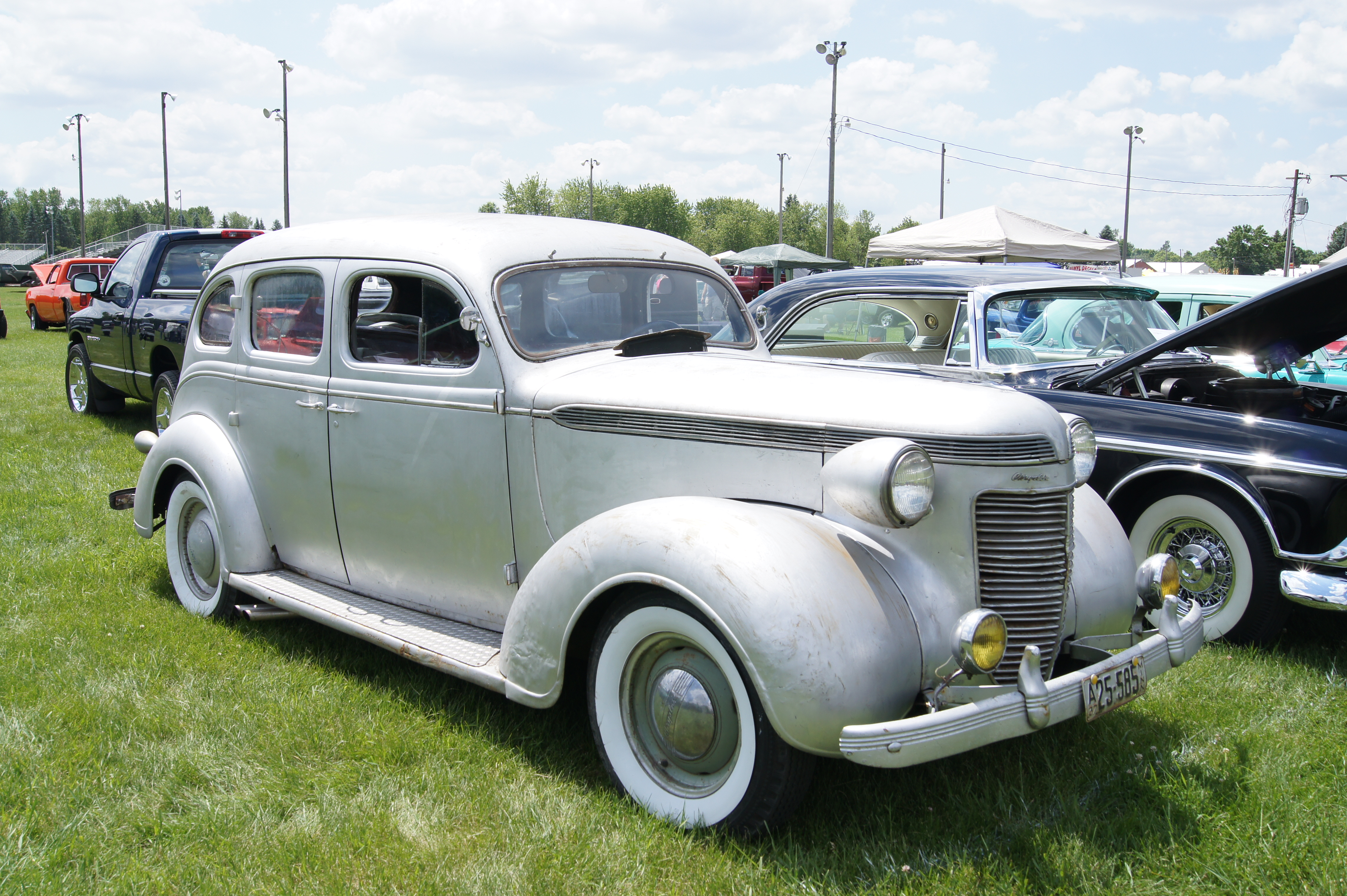
1937 Chrysler Royal Sedan

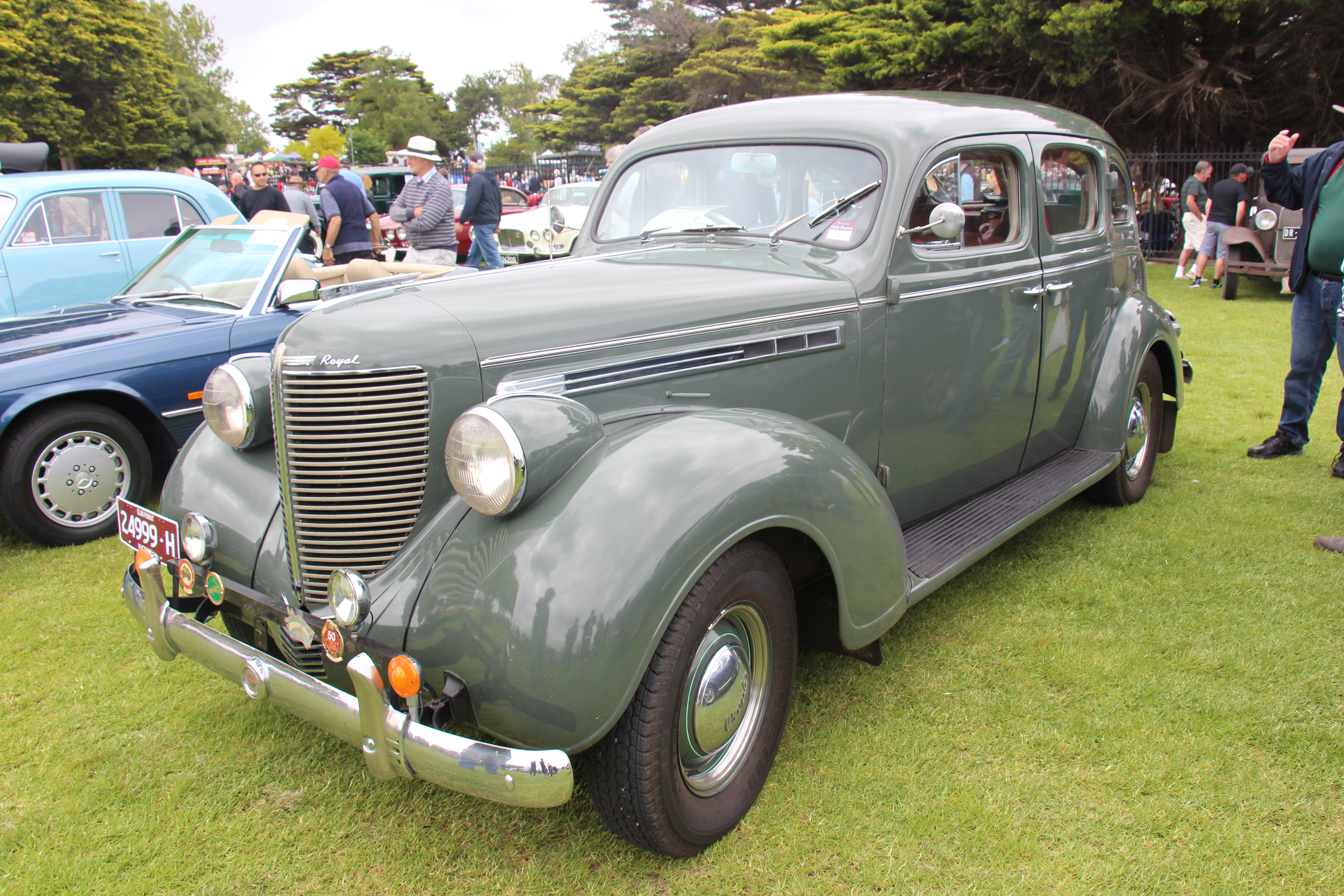
1938 Chrysler Royal Sedan

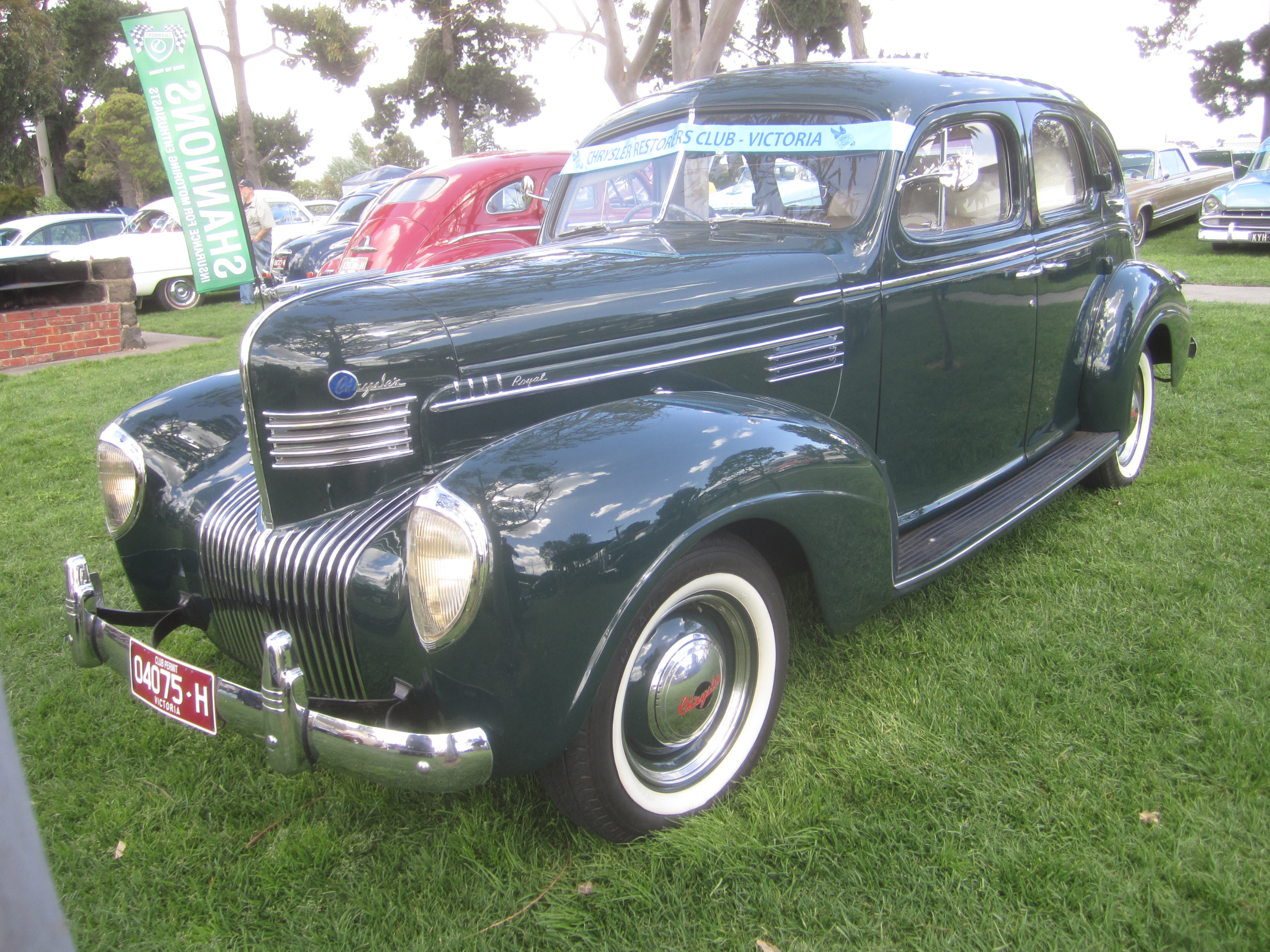
1939 Chrysler Royal Sedan

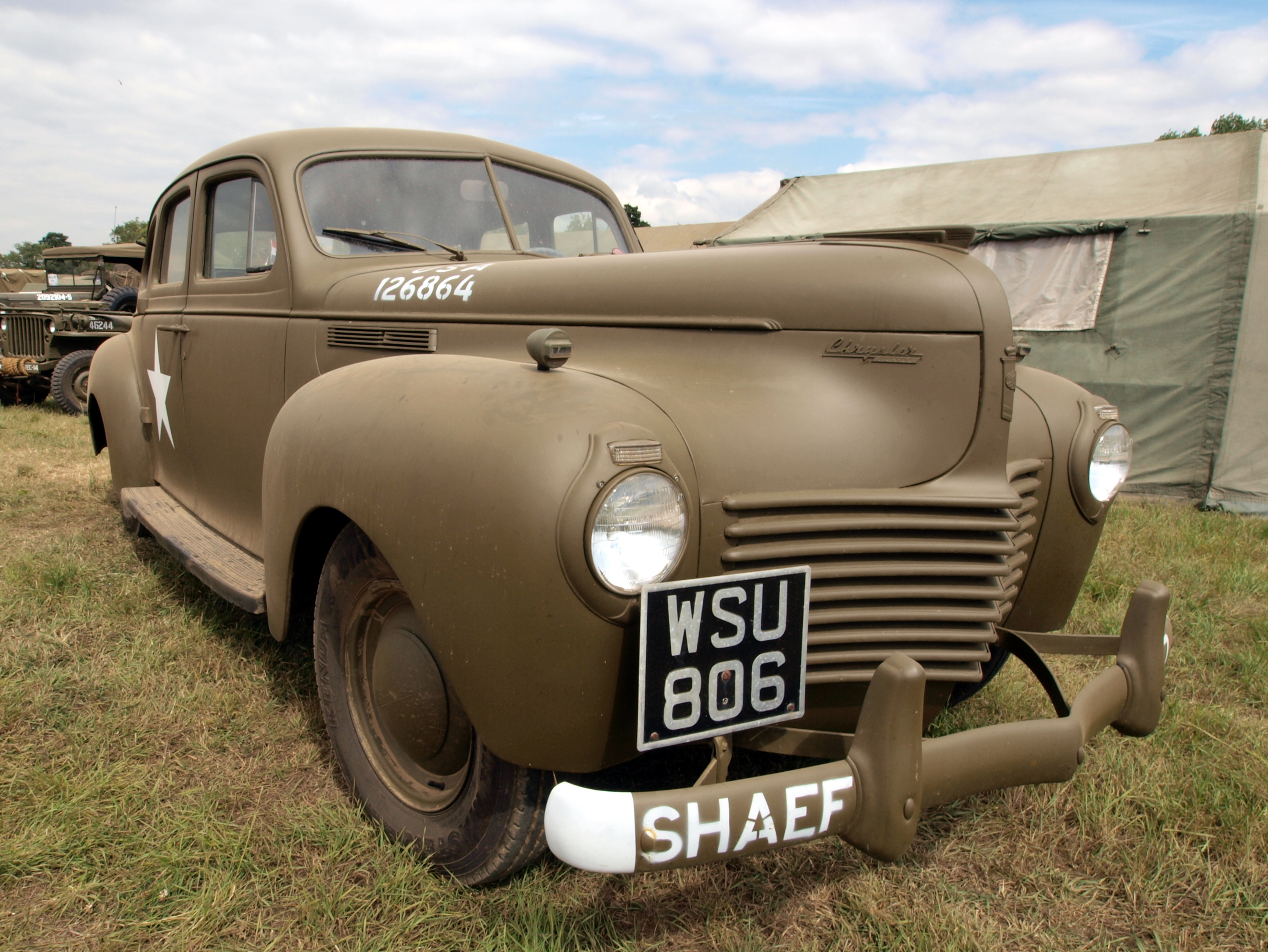
1940 Chrysler Royal Sedan Staff Car

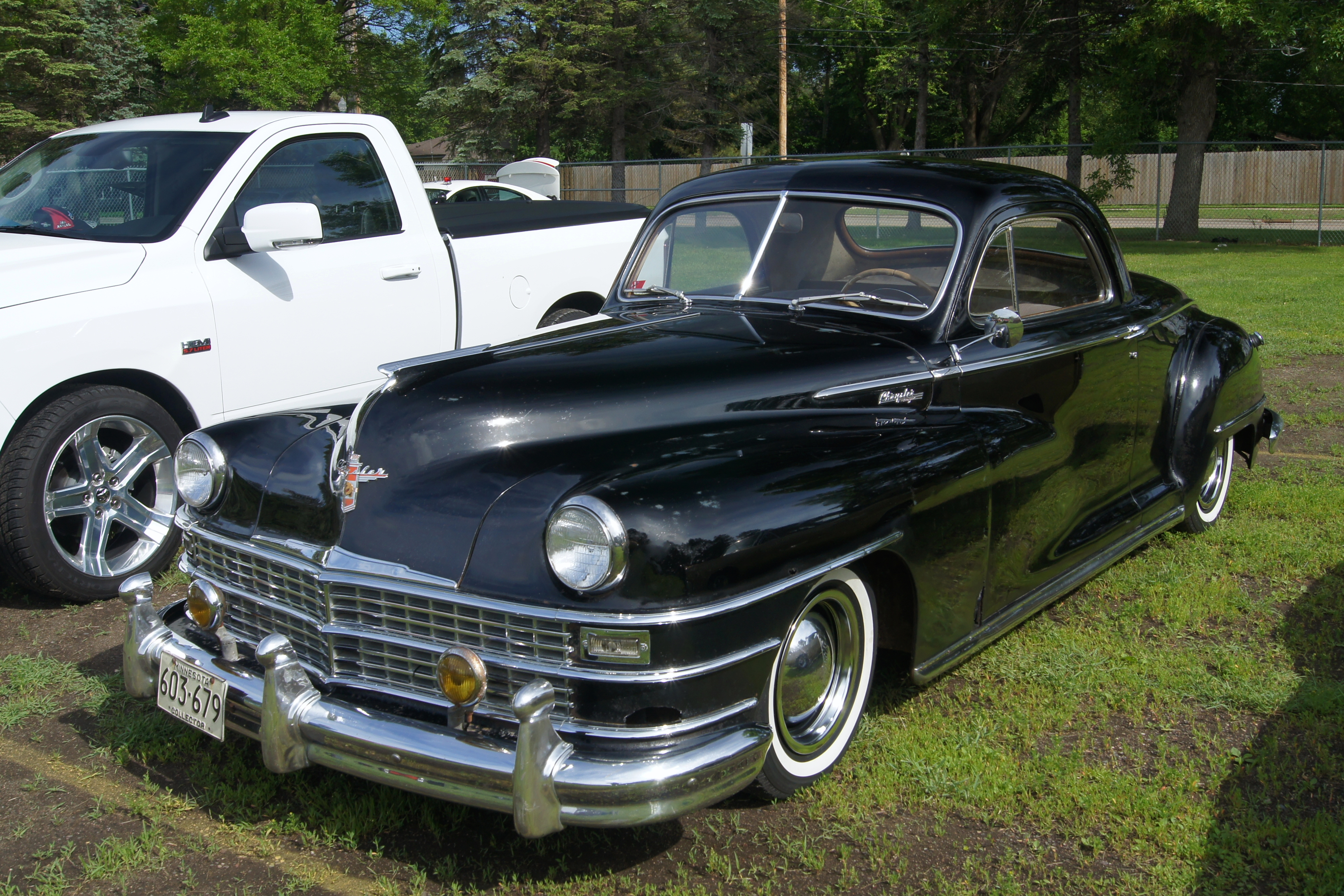
1948 Chrysler Royal Coupe

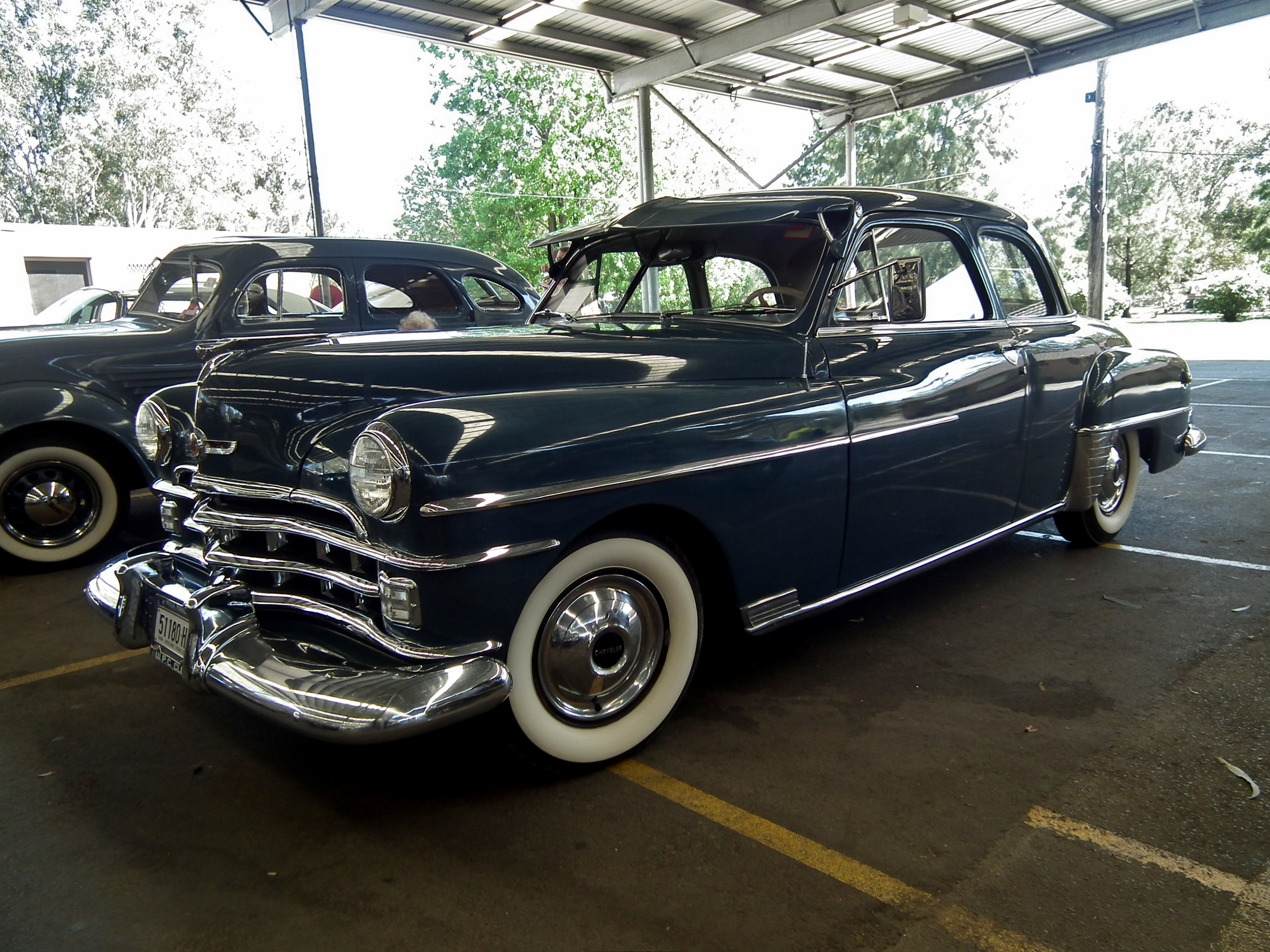
1950 Chrysler Royal Club Coupe

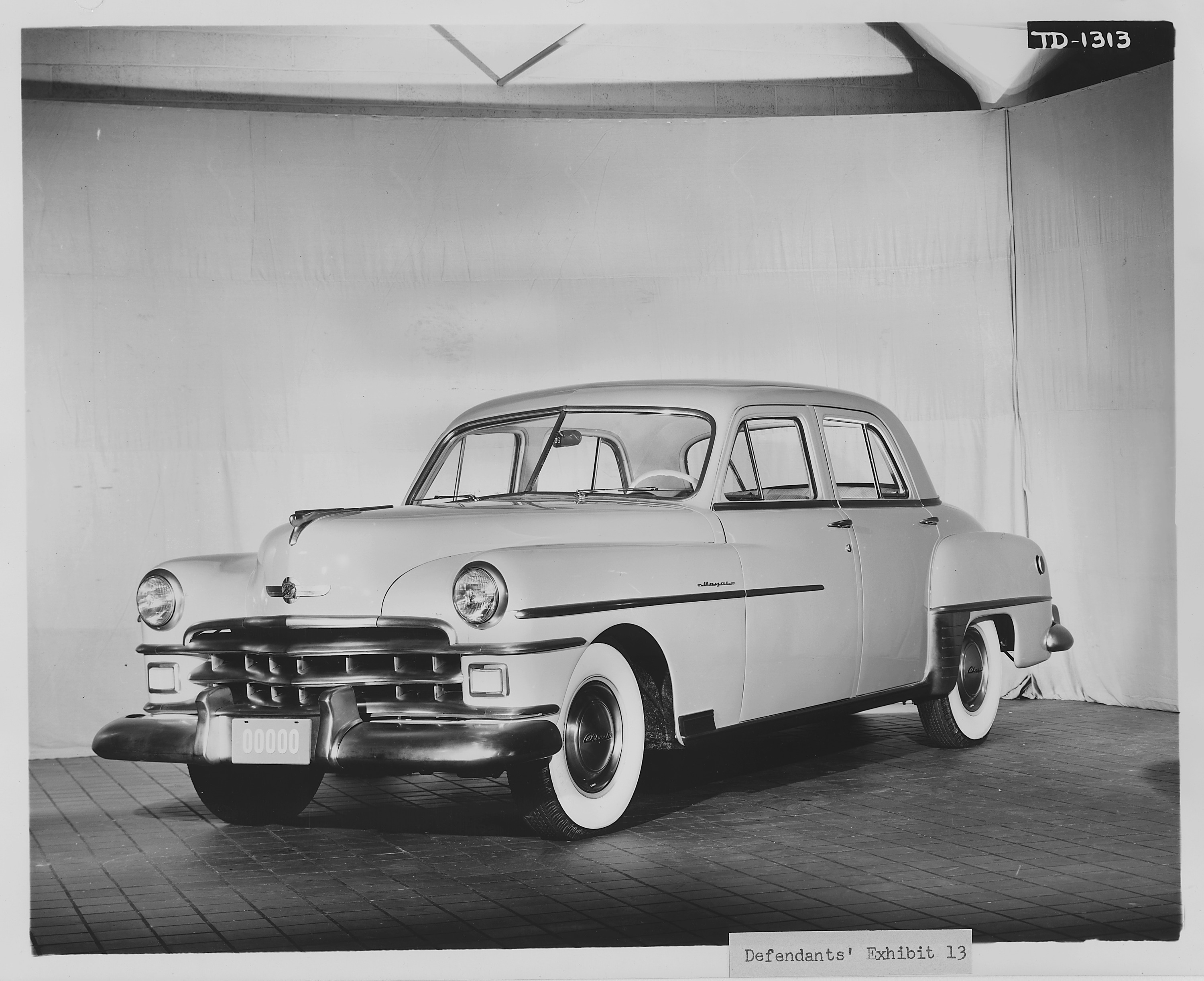
1950 Chrysler Royal Four Door Sedan

== Later use of the Royal name by Chrysler ==
The Royal name was revived by Chrysler Australia in 1957 for an Australian produced model based on the 1953 Plymouth. The "royal" model name was also revived for the 1955 North American Dodge Royal.

The name was later applied as a trim level of the Chrysler Newport from 1970 to 1972; It was also used on Dodge Ram pickup trucks and vans until the early 1990s.

== See also ==
- Chrysler Airflow
- Chrysler Imperial
