= Chrysler flathead engine =

Chrysler Flathead engine
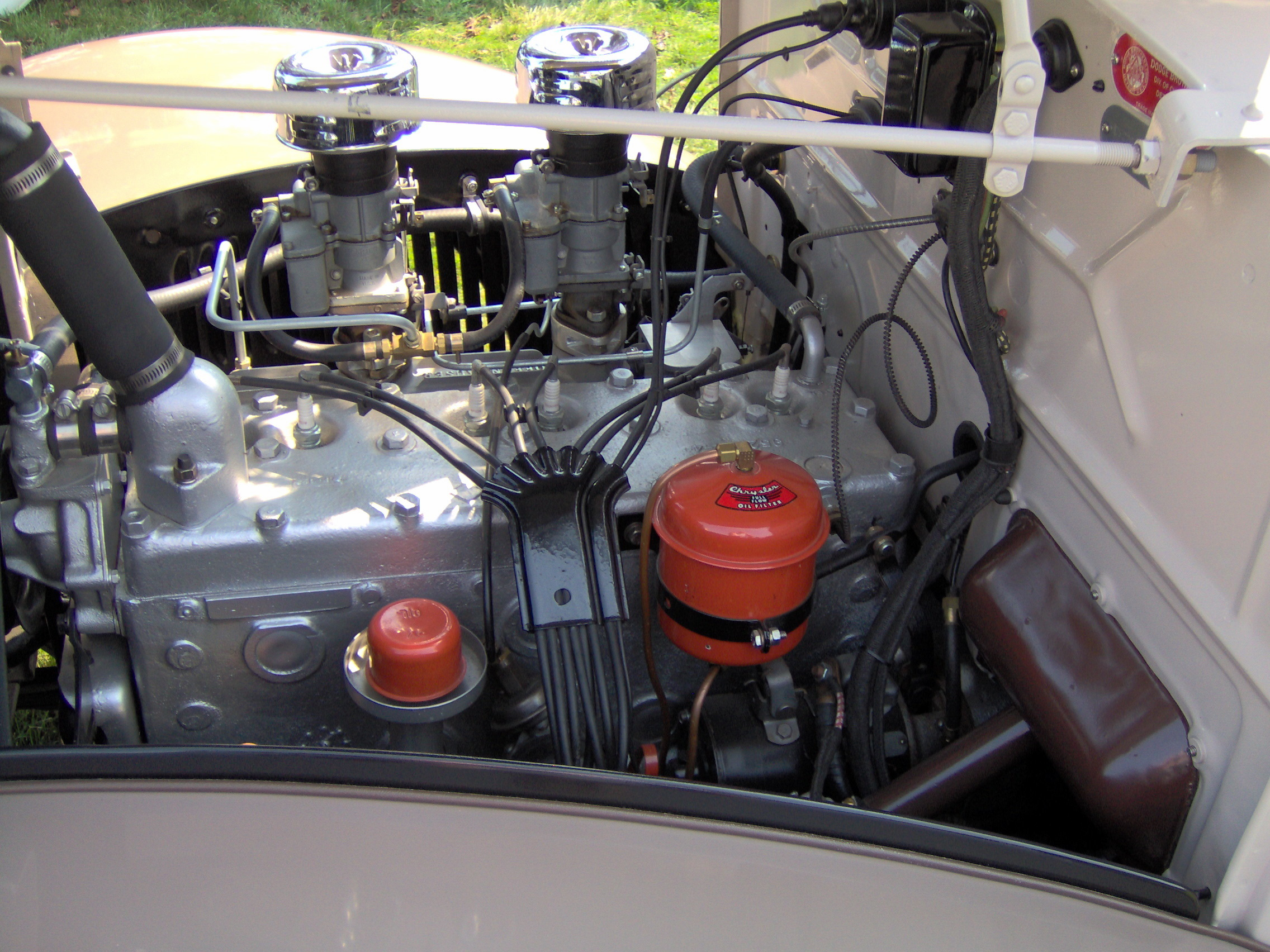

Overview
- Manufacturer: Chrysler Corporation
- Also called: Chrysler Sidevalve engine
- Production: 1926–1933 (four-cylinder); 1924–1964(six-cylinder)

Layout
- Configuration: Side-valve
- Cylinder block material: Cast iron
- Cylinder head material: Cast iron

Combustion
- Fuel system: Carburetor
- Fuel type: Gasoline

Chronology
- Successor: Chrysler Slant-6 engine; Polyspheric V8; chrysler engines

The Chrysler flathead engine is a flathead inline automotive engine manufactured by the Chrysler Corporation from 1924 through the early 1960s. It came in four-, six-, and eight-cylinder configurations and varying displacements, with both cast iron and cast aluminum cylinder heads. It was installed in Chrysler, DeSoto, Dodge, and Plymouth branded vehicles.

== Straight-4 ==
Chrysler introduced a straight-four in 1926 when the Maxwell Motor Corporation was re-organised into the Chrysler Corporation in 1925. Initially used by Chrysler, the straight-four was fitted to Plymouth cars and Dodge light trucks beginning in 1929, lasting in production through 1933.

The original version displaced 185.8 cu in (3,044 cc) and produced 38 hp (28 kW). This was only produced in 1926, with displacement reduced to 170.3 cu in (2,791 cc) for 1927 and 1928. Power was initially rated the same but was upped to 45 hp (34 kW) during the 1928 model year.

After the introduction of the Plymouth brand in 1929, the base engine was subjected to a major redesign and enlarged to 175.4 cu in (2,874.3 cc) with the power rating remaining the same. It was also used in Dodge light trucks in 1929–1930. The engine was enlarged again to 196.1 cu in (3,213 cc) in 1930 with 48 hp (36 kW), for 1931 with 56 hp (42 kW), and 1932 with 65 hp (48 kW) for Plymouth only; Dodge continued with the 48 hp (36 kW) from 1931 to 1933. A small-bore version was developed for export markets in 1931, with a narrower bore which brought the RAC rating down from 21 to 15.6 hp. For 1932 the bore was reduced further, bringing the tax horsepower rating to just beneath 15.5.

Chrysler did not offer a four-cylinder engine again until 1981 with the Chrysler 2.2 & 2.5 engine used in the Chrysler K platform.

Displacement	Year(s)	Horsepower	Applications	Bore	Stroke
186 cu in (3,044 cc)	1926	38	Chrysler model F-58	3 5/8 in (92.1 mm)	4 1/2 in (114.3 mm)
170 cu in (2,791 cc)	1927	38	Chrysler Series 50	3 5/8 in (92.1 mm)	4 1/8 in (104.8 mm)
170 cu in (2,791 cc)	1928	38-45	Chrysler Series 52	3 5/8 in (92.1 mm)	4 1/8 in (104.8 mm)
170 cu in (2,791 cc)	1928	45	Plymouth Model Q	3 5/8 in (92.1 mm)	4 1/8 in (104.8 mm)
175 cu in (2,875 cc)	1929	45	Plymouth U	3 5/8 in (92.1 mm)	4 1/4 in (108.0 mm)
175 cu in (2,875 cc)	1929	45	Dodge 1/2 Ton	3 5/8 in (92.1 mm)	4 1/4 in (108.0 mm)
175 cu in (2,875 cc)	1930	45	Dodge U1-A/B/C	3 5/8 in (92.1 mm)	4 1/4 in (108.0 mm)
196 cu in (3,213 cc)	1930	48	Plymouth 30U	3 5/8 in (92.1 mm)	4 3/4 in (120.7 mm)
196 cu in (3,213 cc)	1931	56	Plymouth PA	3 5/8 in (92.1 mm)	4 3/4 in (120.7 mm)
196 cu in (3,213 cc)	1931	48	Dodge UF-10, U1-B/C	3 5/8 in (92.1 mm)	4 3/4 in (120.7 mm)
196 cu in (3,213 cc)	1932	65	Plymouth PB	3 5/8 in (92.1 mm)	4 3/4 in (120.7 mm)
196 cu in (3,213 cc)	1932	48	Dodge E, UF-10, U1-B/C	3 5/8 in (92.1 mm)	4 3/4 in (120.7 mm)
196 cu in (3,213 cc)	1932	65	Dodge DM (export model)	3 5/8 in (92.1 mm)	4 3/4 in (120.7 mm)
196 cu in (3,213 cc)	1933	48	Dodge UF10, UG20/21	3 5/8 in (92.1 mm)	4 3/4 in (120.7 mm)
146 cu in (2,388 cc)	1931	n/a	Plymouth PAX (export model, 89 built)	3 1/8 in (79.4 mm)	4 3/4 in (120.7 mm)
144 cu in (2,364 cc)	1932	n/a	Plymouth PBX (export model, 58 built)	3 7/64 in (79.0 mm)	4 3/4 in (120.7 mm)

== Straight-6 ==
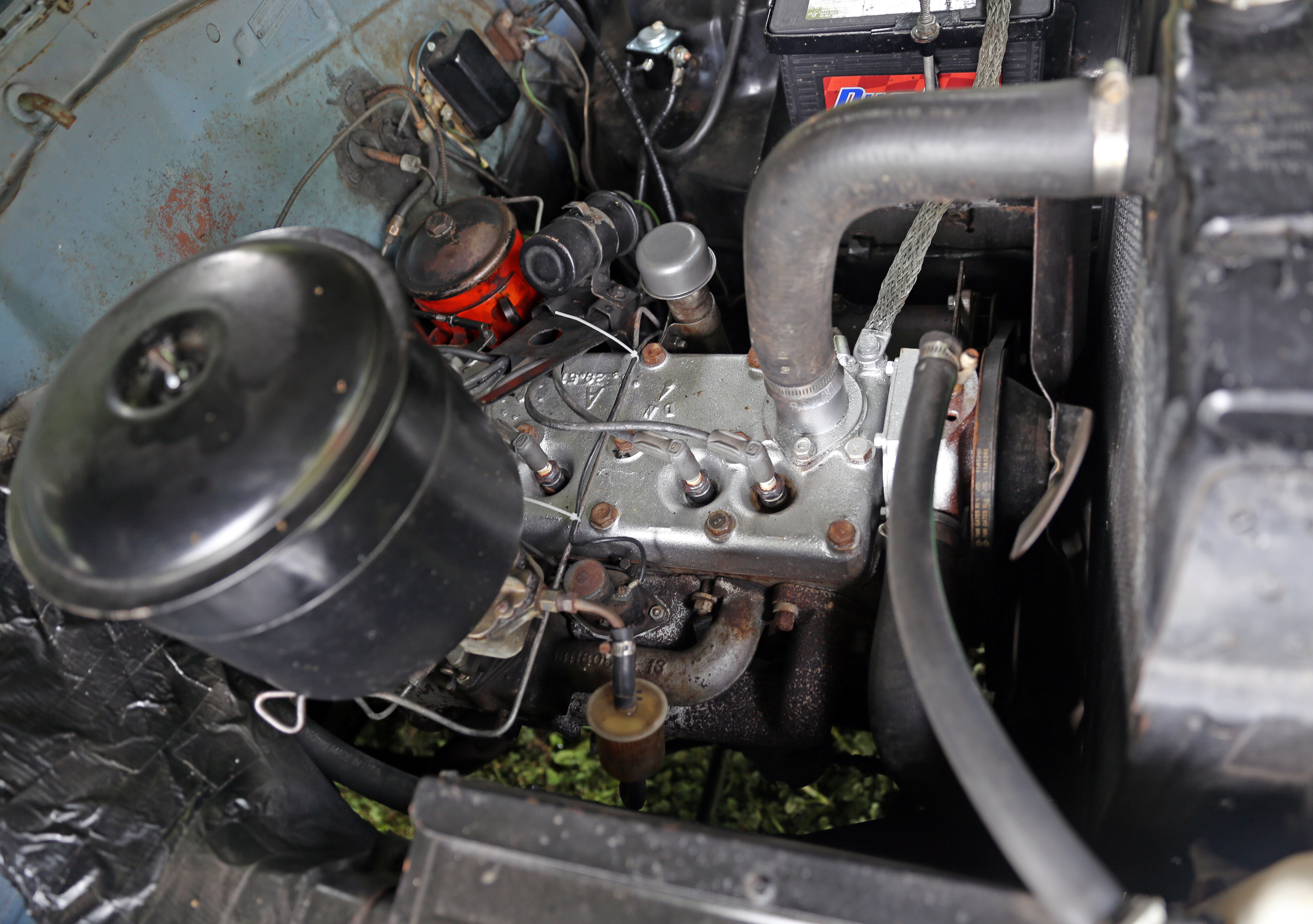
The 218-cubic-inch flathead six as used in a 1951 Plymouth Cranbrook

The first straight-6 was the B-Model (seven main bearings) and introduced in 1924 with the first Chrysler Corporation production, the B70. An upscale version designated E-Model equipped the new Chrysler Imperial E80 in 1926, and a downscale one named H-Model followed in 1927 (Chrysler Series 70). After the purchase of Dodge Brothers Company in 1928, Chrysler Corporation had five straight-6s in production with the addition of the Victory and Senior Dodge Brothers engines.

So, with the introduction of the new Desoto brand in 1929, came a new and cheaper to produce six cylinder, the K-Model, with four main bearings and deep skirts. By mid-1930, it partially replaced the previous engines in varying displacements on passenger cars, in conjunction with an all-new straight-8 engine. Only the Imperial's engine remained in production for the Dodge Trucks' 2-ton Models F-40 & K-50, 3-ton models F-60 & K-70, 2 & 3-ton Special, buses from 1930 to 1934-35. To replace these two engines, a new and very large six cylinder was launched in late 1936 (331 cu. in.), which grew to 413 cu in and was last used in the C-3 Series in 1956.

In 1932, the Ford flathead V8's launch shook up the market, expanding the demand for larger engines to even entry-level brands. A new straight-6 for Plymouth (PC/PD) and Dodge (DP/DQ) came in production in 1933, known as the "23 in block", featuring a shallow skirt and a head desk length of 580 mm, followed by a larger ("25 in block" – 640 mm) variant for Desoto (S3) and Chrysler Royal (C16) in 1937, marking the K-Model end everywhere but in Canada. When Chrysler established an engine foundry in Windsor, Canada, in 1938, it was decided to only use the long block for all Canadian-built engines. These engines received a trailing "C" in their designation. Thanks to judicious bore and stroke dimensioning, the Canadian 201- and 218-cubic inch engines had nearly identical displacement to their American cousins.

Beginning in 1938, the 201 cu in (3,299 cc) straight-six was used in Massey Harris's Model 101 tractor (later known as the 101 Super). It continued to be used by Massey until 1940, when it was supplanted by the 218 cu in (3,568 cc). In 1940, Chrysler's 242 cu in (3,966 cc) straight six went into Massey's 201 Super, which lasted until 1942.

During World War II, the 251 cu in (4,107 cc) flathead six was used as the basis for the Chrysler A57 multibank tank engine.

The last automotive use of the Chrysler flathead straight-six was in 1968 (in the Dodge Power Wagon WM300, its last year of production, which used the 251 cu in variant). It was replaced throughout Chrysler products by the much more efficient OHV Slant-6 released in 1960, which appeared in most Dodge trucks starting in 1961. The flathead remained in production until the early 1970s for industrial and agricultural use.

Displacement	Years	Horsepower	Applications	Bore	Stroke
201 cu in (3,301 cc)	1924-1925	68	Chrysler B-70 Six	3 in (76.2 mm)	4 3/4 in (120.7 mm)
289 cu in (4,730 cc)	1926	92	Chrysler Series E-80	3 1/2 in (88.9 mm)	5 in (127.0 mm)
289 cu in (4,730 cc)	1927-1928	92	Chrysler Series 80	3 1/2 in (88.9 mm)	5 in (127.0 mm)
219 cu in (3,582 cc)	1926	68	Chrysler Model G-70	3 1/8 in (79.4 mm)	4 3/4 in (120.7 mm)
219 cu in (3,582 cc)	1927	68	Chrysler Series 70	3 1/8 in (79.4 mm)	4 3/4 in (120.7 mm)
219 cu in (3,582 cc)	1930	75	Chrysler Series 70 (early)	3 1/8 in (79.4 mm)	4 3/4 in (120.7 mm)
219 cu in (3,582 cc)	1930	68	Chrysler Series 66 (late)	3 1/8 in (79.4 mm)	4 3/4 in (120.7 mm)
219 cu in (3,582 cc)	1931	68	Chrysler Series 66	3 1/8 in (79.4 mm)	4 3/4 in (120.7 mm)
180 cu in (2,954 cc)	1927	54	Chrysler Series 60	3 in (76.2 mm)	4 1/4 in (108.0 mm)
180 cu in (2,954 cc)	1928	54 (std.); 60 (opt.)	Chrysler Series 62	3 in (76.2 mm)	4 1/4 in (108.0 mm)
175 cu in (2,867 cc)	1929	55	DeSoto Series K	3 in (76.2 mm)	4 1/8 in (104.8 mm)
175 cu in (2,867 cc)	1930	57	DeSoto Series K	3 in (76.2 mm)	4 1/8 in (104.8 mm)
175 cu in (2,867 cc)	1932	n/a	Chrysler Richmond (CIX; UK only)	3 in (76.2 mm)	4 1/8 in (104.8 mm)
175 cu in (2,867 cc)	1933	n/a	Chrysler Richmond (COX; UK only)	3 in (76.2 mm)	4 1/8 in (104.8 mm)
190 cu in (3,111 cc)	1930-1932	61	Dodge Series DD	3 1/8 in (79.4 mm)	4 1/8 in (104.8 mm)
190 cu in (3,111 cc)	1933	70	Dodge Series DQ (CDN/export)	3 1/8 in (79.4 mm)	4 1/8 in (104.8 mm)
190 cu in (3,111 cc)	1930-1931	60	DeSoto Series CK	3 1/8 in (79.4 mm)	4 1/8 in (104.8 mm)
190 cu in (3,111 cc)	1933	70 (std.); 76 (opt.)	Plymouth PC/PCXX/PD	3 1/8 in (79.4 mm)	4 1/8 in (104.8 mm)
161 cu in (2,633 cc)	1930	n/a	DeSoto Series CK (UK)	2 7/8 in (73.0 mm)	4 1/8 in (104.8 mm)
161 cu in (2,633 cc)	1930	n/a	Dodge Series DD (UK)	2 7/8 in (73.0 mm)	4 1/8 in (104.8 mm)
161 cu in (2,633 cc)	1931-1932	n/a	DeSoto Series SAX (export, late cars sold as "Chrysler Light Six")	2 7/8 in (73.0 mm)	4 1/8 in (104.8 mm)
161 cu in (2,633 cc)	1933	n/a	Plymouth PCX/PCXXPDX/Chrysler Kew/Wimbledon (export models, 651 built)	2 7/8 in (73.0 mm)	4 1/8 in (104.8 mm)
196 cu in (3,205 cc)	1929	65 (std.); 72 (opt.)	Chrysler Series 65	3 1/8 in (79.4 mm)	4 1/4 in (108.0 mm)
196 cu in (3,205 cc)	1930	62	Chrysler Series 66 (until Feb. 1930, longer in UK)	3 1/8 in (79.4 mm)	4 1/4 in (108.0 mm)
196 cu in (3,205 cc)	1930-1931	62	Chrysler Series CJ	3 1/8 in (79.4 mm)	4 1/4 in (108.0 mm)
201 cu in (3,299 cc)	1938	n/a	Plymouth P5/P6 (Canada-made, late introduction)	3 3/8 in (85.7 mm)	3 3/4 in (95.3 mm)
201 cu in (3,299 cc)	1938	n/a	Dodge Series D9/D10 (Canada-made, late introduction)	3 3/8 in (85.7 mm)	3 3/4 in (95.3 mm)
201 cu in (3,299 cc)	1939	n/a	Plymouth P7/P8 (Canada-made)	3 3/8 in (85.7 mm)	3 3/4 in (95.3 mm)
201 cu in (3,299 cc)	1939	n/a	Dodge Series D12/D13 (Canada-made)	3 3/8 in (85.7 mm)	3 3/4 in (95.3 mm)
201 cu in (3,299 cc)	1933	75 (std.); 81 (opt.)	Dodge Series DP	3 1/8 in (79.4 mm)	4 3/8 in (111.1 mm)
201 cu in (3,299 cc)	1934	77	Dodge Series DT (CDN/export)	3 1/8 in (79.4 mm)	4 3/8 in (111.1 mm)
201 cu in (3,299 cc)	1934	77 (std.); 82 (opt.)	Plymouth PE/PF/PFXX/PG; Chrysler Wimbledon (UK)	3 1/8 in (79.4 mm)	4 3/8 in (111.1 mm)
201 cu in (3,299 cc)	1935	82	Dodge Series DV/DV-6 (CDN/export)	3 1/8 in (79.4 mm)	4 3/8 in (111.1 mm)
201 cu in (3,299 cc)	1935	82	Plymouth Model PJ; Chrysler Wimbledon (UK)	3 1/8 in (79.4 mm)	4 3/8 in (111.1 mm)
201 cu in (3,299 cc)	1936	82	Dodge Series D-3/D-4 (CDN/export)	3 1/8 in (79.4 mm)	4 3/8 in (111.1 mm)
201 cu in (3,299 cc)	1936	82	Plymouth P1/P2; Chrysler Wimbledon (UK)	3 1/8 in (79.4 mm)	4 3/8 in (111.1 mm)
201 cu in (3,299 cc)	1937	82	Dodge Series D6/D7 (CDN/export)	3 1/8 in (79.4 mm)	4 3/8 in (111.1 mm)
201 cu in (3,299 cc)	1937	82 (std.); 65 (Economy)	Plymouth P3/P4; Chrysler Kew/Wimbledon (UK)	3 1/8 in (79.4 mm)	4 3/8 in (111.1 mm)
201 cu in (3,299 cc)	1937	70	Plymouth PT50 (commercials)	3 1/8 in (79.4 mm)	4 3/8 in (111.1 mm)
201 cu in (3,299 cc)	1938	82	Dodge Series D9/D10 (CDN/export)	3 1/8 in (79.4 mm)	4 3/8 in (111.1 mm)
201 cu in (3,299 cc)	1938	82 (std.); 65 (Economy); 86 (opt.)	Plymouth P5/P6; Chrysler Kew/Wimbledon (UK)	3 1/8 in (79.4 mm)	4 3/8 in (111.1 mm)
201 cu in (3,299 cc)	1938	70	Plymouth PT57 (commercials)	3 1/8 in (79.4 mm)	4 3/8 in (111.1 mm)
201 cu in (3,299 cc)	1939	82	Dodge Series D12 (export)	3 1/8 in (79.4 mm)	4 3/8 in (111.1 mm)
201 cu in (3,299 cc)	1939	82 (std.); 86 (opt.)	Plymouth P7/P8; Chrysler Kew/Wimbledon (UK)	3 1/8 in (79.4 mm)	4 3/8 in (111.1 mm)
201 cu in (3,299 cc)	1939	70	Plymouth PT81 (commercials)	3 1/8 in (79.4 mm)	4 3/8 in (111.1 mm)
201 cu in (3,299 cc)	1940	84 (std.); 87 (opt.)	Plymouth P9/P10	3 1/8 in (79.4 mm)	4 3/8 in (111.1 mm)
201 cu in (3,299 cc)	1940	79	Plymouth PT105 (commercials)	3 1/8 in (79.4 mm)	4 3/8 in (111.1 mm)
201 cu in (3,299 cc)	1941	87 (std.); 92 (opt.)	Plymouth P11/P12	3 1/8 in (79.4 mm)	4 3/8 in (111.1 mm)
201 cu in (3,299 cc)	1941	82	Plymouth PT125 (commercials)	3 1/8 in (79.4 mm)	4 3/8 in (111.1 mm)
170 cu in (2,793 cc)	1931	n/a	Dodge Series DH (UK)	2 7/8 in (73.0 mm)	4 3/8 in (111.1 mm)
170 cu in (2,793 cc)	1931-1932	n/a	Chrysler CMX (UK, from Aug. 1931)	2 7/8 in (73.0 mm)	4 3/8 in (111.1 mm)
170 cu in (2,793 cc)	1932-1933	n/a	DeSoto SCX/Chrysler Mortlake (UK)	2 7/8 in (73.0 mm)	4 3/8 in (111.1 mm)
170 cu in (2,793 cc)	1933	n/a	DeSoto SDX/Chrysler Wimbledon (UK)	2 7/8 in (73.0 mm)	4 3/8 in (111.1 mm)
170 cu in (2,793 cc)	1933	n/a	Dodge Series DP Victory (UK)	2 7/8 in (73.0 mm)	4 3/8 in (111.1 mm)
170 cu in (2,793 cc)	1934	n/a	Dodge Series DR Victory (UK)	2 7/8 in (73.0 mm)	4 3/8 in (111.1 mm)
170 cu in (2,793 cc)	1934	n/a	Plymouth PEX/PFX (export models, 1529 built); Chrysler Kew/Wimbledon (UK)	2 7/8 in (73.0 mm)	4 3/8 in (111.1 mm)
170 cu in (2,793 cc)	1935	n/a	Dodge Series DUX Victory (UK)	2 7/8 in (73.0 mm)	4 3/8 in (111.1 mm)
170 cu in (2,793 cc)	1935	n/a	Plymouth PJX (export models, 754 built); Chrysler Kew (UK)	2 7/8 in (73.0 mm)	4 3/8 in (111.1 mm)
170 cu in (2,793 cc)	1936	n/a	Dodge Series D2X Victory (UK)	2 7/8 in (73.0 mm)	4 3/8 in (111.1 mm)
170 cu in (2,793 cc)	1936	n/a	Plymouth P1X/P2X (export models, 661 built with P2X engine code, plus 35 Dodge D-3/D-4); Chrysler Kew (UK)	2 7/8 in (73.0 mm)	4 3/8 in (111.1 mm)
170 cu in (2,793 cc)	1937	n/a	Desoto Series S3X (export models)	2 7/8 in (73.0 mm)	4 3/8 in (111.1 mm)
170 cu in (2,793 cc)	1937	n/a	Dodge Series D5X (UK)	2 7/8 in (73.0 mm)	4 3/8 in (111.1 mm)
170 cu in (2,793 cc)	1937	n/a	Plymouth P3X/P4X (export models, 657 built with P4X engine code, plus 39 Dodge D6X); Chrysler Kew (UK)	2 7/8 in (73.0 mm)	4 3/8 in (111.1 mm)
170 cu in (2,793 cc)	1938	n/a	Desoto Series S5X (export models)	2 7/8 in (73.0 mm)	4 3/8 in (111.1 mm)
170 cu in (2,793 cc)	1938	n/a	Dodge Series D8X (export models)	2 7/8 in (73.0 mm)	4 3/8 in (111.1 mm)
170 cu in (2,793 cc)	1938	n/a	Plymouth P5X/P6X (export models, 333 built with P6X engine code); 81 Dodge D9X); Chrysler Kew (UK)	2 7/8 in (73.0 mm)	4 3/8 in (111.1 mm)
170 cu in (2,793 cc)	1939	n/a	Desoto Series S6X (export models)	2 7/8 in (73.0 mm)	4 3/8 in (111.1 mm)
170 cu in (2,793 cc)	1939	n/a	Dodge Series D11X (export model, unknown production)	2 7/8 in (73.0 mm)	4 3/8 in (111.1 mm)
170 cu in (2,793 cc)	1939	n/a	Plymouth P7/P8 (export models, 273 built plus 38 Dodge D12X and some DeSoto-badged SP7X/SP8X); Chrysler Kew (UK)	2 7/8 in (73.0 mm)	4 3/8 in (111.1 mm)
170 cu in (2,793 cc)	1940	n/a	Dodge Series D14X (export models none built)	2 7/8 in (73.0 mm)	4 3/8 in (111.1 mm)
170 cu in (2,793 cc)	1940	70	Plymouth P9X/P10X (export models, one built/none built)	2 7/8 in (73.0 mm)	4 3/8 in (111.1 mm)
170 cu in (2,793 cc)	1941	n/a	Dodge Series D19X (export models, unknown production)	2 7/8 in (73.0 mm)	4 3/8 in (111.1 mm)
170 cu in (2,793 cc)	1941	n/a	Plymouth P11X/P12X (export models, unknown production)	2 7/8 in (73.0 mm)	4 3/8 in (111.1 mm)
208 cu in (3,409 cc)	1927-1928	58	Dodge Standard Six (140/141/J); Dodge Victory Six (130/131/M)	3 3/8 in (85.7 mm)	3 7/8 in (98.4 mm)
208 cu in (3,409 cc)	1929-1930	63	Dodge Series DA	3 3/8 in (85.7 mm)	3 7/8 in (98.4 mm)
212 cu in (3,467 cc)	1931	68	Dodge Series DH	3 1/4 in (82.6 mm)	4 1/4 in (108.0 mm)
212 cu in (3,467 cc)	1932	74	Dodge Series DH	3 1/4 in (82.6 mm)	4 1/4 in (108.0 mm)
218 cu in (3,568 cc)	1931	78	Chrysler Series CM-6	3 1/4 in (82.6 mm)	4 3/8 in (111.1 mm)
218 cu in (3,568 cc)	1932	78	Chrysler Series CM-6	3 1/4 in (82.6 mm)	4 3/8 in (111.1 mm)
218 cu in (3,568 cc)	1932	75	DeSoto Series SC	3 1/4 in (82.6 mm)	4 3/8 in (111.1 mm)
218 cu in (3,568 cc)	1932	79	Dodge Series DL	3 1/4 in (82.6 mm)	4 3/8 in (111.1 mm)
218 cu in (3,568 cc)	1933	82	DeSoto S-All	3 1/4 in (82.6 mm)	4 3/8 in (111.1 mm)
218 cu in (3,568 cc)	1934	82	Dodge Series DR/DRXX	3 1/4 in (82.6 mm)	4 3/8 in (111.1 mm)
218 cu in (3,568 cc)	1934	87	Dodge Series DR (opt.)/DS (std.)	3 1/4 in (82.6 mm)	4 3/8 in (111.1 mm)
218 cu in (3,568 cc)	1935	87	Dodge Series DU	3 1/4 in (82.6 mm)	4 3/8 in (111.1 mm)
218 cu in (3,568 cc)	1936	87	Dodge Series D2	3 1/4 in (82.6 mm)	4 3/8 in (111.1 mm)
218 cu in (3,568 cc)	1937	87	Dodge Series D5	3 1/4 in (82.6 mm)	4 3/8 in (111.1 mm)
218 cu in (3,568 cc)	1938	87	Dodge Series D8	3 1/4 in (82.6 mm)	4 3/8 in (111.1 mm)
218 cu in (3,568 cc)	1939	87	Dodge Series D11/D11S	3 1/4 in (82.6 mm)	4 3/8 in (111.1 mm)
218 cu in (3,568 cc)	1940	87	Dodge Series D14/D17; Dodge Series D15 (US-made for export)	3 1/4 in (82.6 mm)	4 3/8 in (111.1 mm)
218 cu in (3,568 cc)	1941	91	Dodge Series D19; Dodge Series D20 (US-made for export)	3 1/4 in (82.6 mm)	4 3/8 in (111.1 mm)
218 cu in (3,568 cc)	1942	95	Plymouth S-All	3 1/4 in (82.6 mm)	4 3/8 in (111.1 mm)
218 cu in (3,568 cc)	1942	95	Dodge Series D23 (US-made for export)	3 1/4 in (82.6 mm)	4 3/8 in (111.1 mm)
218 cu in (3,568 cc)	1946-1949	95	Plymouth S-All	3 1/4 in (82.6 mm)	4 3/8 in (111.1 mm)
218 cu in (3,568 cc)	1949	97	Plymouth S-All	3 1/4 in (82.6 mm)	4 3/8 in (111.1 mm)
218 cu in (3,568 cc)	1950	97	Plymouth S-All	3 1/4 in (82.6 mm)	4 3/8 in (111.1 mm)
218 cu in (3,568 cc)	1951	97	Plymouth S-All	3 1/4 in (82.6 mm)	4 3/8 in (111.1 mm)
218 cu in (3,568 cc)	1952	97	Plymouth S-All	3 1/4 in (82.6 mm)	4 3/8 in (111.1 mm)
218 cu in (3,568 cc)	1953	100	Plymouth S-All	3 1/4 in (82.6 mm)	4 3/8 in (111.1 mm)
218 cu in (3,568 cc)	1954	100	Plymouth S-All (Early)	3 1/4 in (82.6 mm)	4 3/8 in (111.1 mm)
218 cu in (3,573 cc)	1939	n/a	Dodge D11 (Canada-made)	3 3/8 in (85.7 mm)	4 1/16 in (103.2 mm)
218 cu in (3,573 cc)	1940	84.25	Dodge Series D14/D15 (Canada-made)	3 3/8 in (85.7 mm)	4 1/16 in (103.2 mm)
218 cu in (3,573 cc)	1940	n/a	Plymouth P9/P10 (Canada-made)	3 3/8 in (85.7 mm)	4 1/16 in (103.2 mm)
218 cu in (3,573 cc)	1941	88	Dodge Series D20/D21 (Canada-made)	3 3/8 in (85.7 mm)	4 1/16 in (103.2 mm)
218 cu in (3,573 cc)	1941	88	Plymouth P11/P12 (Canada-made)	3 3/8 in (85.7 mm)	4 1/16 in (103.2 mm)
218 cu in (3,573 cc)	1942	88	Dodge Series D23 (Canada-made)	3 3/8 in (85.7 mm)	4 1/16 in (103.2 mm)
218 cu in (3,573 cc)	1942	88	Plymouth P14 (Canada-made)	3 3/8 in (85.7 mm)	4 1/16 in (103.2 mm)
218 cu in (3,573 cc)	1946-early 1949	95	Plymouth P15S & P15C (Canada-made); Dodge D25S & D25S (Canada-made)	3 3/8 in (85.7 mm)	4 1/16 in (103.2 mm)
218 cu in (3,573 cc)	1949	97	Plymouth P17 & P18 (Canada-made); Dodge D31 & D32 (Canada-made)	3 3/8 in (85.7 mm)	4 1/16 in (103.2 mm)
218 cu in (3,573 cc)	1950	97	Plymouth P22 & P23 (Canada-made); Dodge D35 & D36 (Canada-made)	3 3/8 in (85.7 mm)	4 1/16 in (103.2 mm)
218 cu in (3,573 cc)	1951-1952	97	Plymouth P22 & P23 (Canada-made); Dodge D39 & D40 (Canada-made)	3 3/8 in (85.7 mm)	4 1/16 in (103.2 mm)
218 cu in (3,573 cc)	1953	97	Plymouth P24-1, P24-2 & P24-3 (Canada-made); Dodge D49-1 & D49-2 (Canada-made)	3 3/8 in (85.7 mm)	4 1/16 in (103.2 mm)
224 cu in (3,671 cc)	1927-1928	60	Dodge Senior Six (Series 2249)	3 1/4 in (82.6 mm)	4 1/2 in (114.3 mm)
224 cu in (3,671 cc)	1928	68	Dodge Senior Six (Series 2251/2252)	3 1/4 in (82.6 mm)	4 1/2 in (114.3 mm)
224 cu in (3,671 cc)	1932	82	Chrysler Series CI; Chrysler Kingston (UK)	3 1/4 in (82.6 mm)	4 1/2 in (114.3 mm)
224 cu in (3,671 cc)	1933	83 (std.); 89 (opt.)	Chrysler Series CO; Chrysler Kingston (UK)	3 1/4 in (82.6 mm)	4 1/2 in (114.3 mm)
228 cu in (3,738 cc)	1937	93	DeSoto Series S-3; Chrysler Richmond (UK; 1937–1938)	3 3/8 in (85.7 mm)	4 1/4 in (108.0 mm)
228 cu in (3,738 cc)	1937	93 (std.); 100 (opt.)	Chrysler Series C-16	3 3/8 in (85.7 mm)	4 1/4 in (108.0 mm)
228 cu in (3,738 cc)	1938	93 (std.); 100 (opt.)	DeSoto Series S-5	3 3/8 in (85.7 mm)	4 1/4 in (108.0 mm)
228 cu in (3,738 cc)	1939	93 (std.); 100 (opt.)	DeSoto Series S-6	3 3/8 in (85.7 mm)	4 1/4 in (108.0 mm)
228 cu in (3,738 cc)	1940	100 (std.); 105 (opt.)	DeSoto Series S-7; DeSoto Series S-7S (Canada-made)	3 3/8 in (85.7 mm)	4 1/4 in (108.0 mm)
228 cu in (3,738 cc)	1941	100; 105; 110	DeSoto Series S-8 DeLuxe; DeSoto Series S-8 Custom; DeSoto Series S-8 (optional)	3 3/8 in (85.7 mm)	4 1/4 in (108.0 mm)
228 cu in (3,738 cc)	1942	105	Dodge D22C (Canada-made)	3 3/8 in (85.7 mm)	4 1/4 in (108.0 mm)
228 cu in (3,738 cc)	1946-Early 1949	105	Dodge D24 (Canada-made)	3 3/8 in (85.7 mm)	4 1/4 in (108.0 mm)
228 cu in (3,738 cc)	1949	105	Dodge D30 Custom (Canada-made)	3 3/8 in (85.7 mm)	4 1/4 in (108.0 mm)
228 cu in (3,738 cc)	1950	105	Dodge D34 Custom (Canada-made)	3 3/8 in (85.7 mm)	4 1/4 in (108.0 mm)
228 cu in (3,738 cc)	1951-1952	105	Dodge D42 Coronet (Canada-made)	3 3/8 in (85.7 mm)	4 1/4 in (108.0 mm)
228 cu in (3,738 cc)	1953	115 101 (bhp)	Dodge D43-1, D43-2 & D43-3 (Canada-made w/ Hy-Drive); Dodge D43 (Australia-built)	3 3/8 in (85.7 mm)	4 1/4 in (108.0 mm)
228 cu in (3,738 cc)	1954	115	Plymouth P25-1, P25-2 & P25-3 (Canada-made); Dodge D49-1 & D49-2 (Canada made)	3 3/8 in (85.7 mm)	4 1/4 in (108.0 mm)
228 cu in (3,738 cc)	1955	115	Plymouth P26-1, P26-2 & P26-3 (Canada-made, w/ manual transmission); Dodge D54-1, D54-2 & D54-4 (Canada-made, w/ manual transmission)	3 3/8 in (85.7 mm)	4 1/4 in (108.0 mm)
230 cu in (3,772 cc)	1942	105	Dodge Series D22	3 1/4 in (82.6 mm)	4 5/8 in (117.5 mm)
230 cu in (3,772 cc)	1946-1949	102	Dodge S-All	3 1/4 in (82.6 mm)	4 5/8 in (117.5 mm)
230 cu in (3,772 cc)	1949	103	Dodge S-All	3 1/4 in (82.6 mm)	4 5/8 in (117.5 mm)
230 cu in (3,772 cc)	1950	103	Dodge S-All	3 1/4 in (82.6 mm)	4 5/8 in (117.5 mm)
230 cu in (3,772 cc)	1951	103	Dodge S-All	3 1/4 in (82.6 mm)	4 5/8 in (117.5 mm)
230 cu in (3,772 cc)	1952	103	Dodge S-All	3 1/4 in (82.6 mm)	4 5/8 in (117.5 mm)
230 cu in (3,772 cc)	1953	103	Dodge S-D-46, D-47	3 1/4 in (82.6 mm)	4 5/8 in (117.5 mm)
230 cu in (3,772 cc)	1954	110	Plymouth S-All (from February 26)	3 1/4 in (82.6 mm)	4 5/8 in (117.5 mm)
230 cu in (3,772 cc)	1954	110	Dodge S-All I-6	3 1/4 in (82.6 mm)	4 5/8 in (117.5 mm)
230 cu in (3,772 cc)	1955	117	Plymouth S-All I-6	3 1/4 in (82.6 mm)	4 5/8 in (117.5 mm)
230 cu in (3,772 cc)	1955	123	Dodge S-Coronet I-6	3 1/4 in (82.6 mm)	4 5/8 in (117.5 mm)
230 cu in (3,772 cc)	1956	125	Plymouth S-all exc Fury, Belvedere cvt	3 1/4 in (82.6 mm)	4 5/8 in (117.5 mm)
230 cu in (3,772 cc)	1956	131	Plymouth O-all exc Fury, Belvedere cvt	3 1/4 in (82.6 mm)	4 5/8 in (117.5 mm)
230 cu in (3,772 cc)	1956	131	Dodge S-Coronet I-6	3 1/4 in (82.6 mm)	4 5/8 in (117.5 mm)
230 cu in (3,772 cc)	1957-1958	115	Chrysler Royal/Chrysler Plainsman AP1 (AUS-made)	3 1/4 in (82.6 mm)	4 5/8 in (117.5 mm)
230 cu in (3,772 cc)	1957	132	Plymouth S-All exc Fury, Belvedere, cvt	3 1/4 in (82.6 mm)	4 5/8 in (117.5 mm)
230 cu in (3,772 cc)	1957	138	Dodge S-Coronet I-6	3 1/4 in (82.6 mm)	4 5/8 in (117.5 mm)
230 cu in (3,772 cc)	1958	132	Plymouth S-All exc Fury, Belvedere cvt	3 1/4 in (82.6 mm)	4 5/8 in (117.5 mm)
230 cu in (3,772 cc)	1958	138	Dodge S-Coronet I-6	3 1/4 in (82.6 mm)	4 5/8 in (117.5 mm)
230 cu in (3,772 cc)	1959	132	Plymouth S-Savoy, Belvedere, Suburban exc. Custom 9P, Fury, Sport Fury	3 1/4 in (82.6 mm)	4 5/8 in (117.5 mm)
230 cu in (3,772 cc)	1959	138	Dodge S-Coronet I-6	3 1/4 in (82.6 mm)	4 5/8 in (117.5 mm)
237 cu in (3,878 cc)	1942	115	DeSoto Series S-10	3 7/16 in (87.3 mm)	4 1/4 in (108.0 mm)
237 cu in (3,878 cc)	1946-1949	109	DeSoto S-All	3 7/16 in (87.3 mm)	4 1/4 in (108.0 mm)
237 cu in (3,878 cc)	1949	112	DeSoto S-All	3 7/16 in (87.3 mm)	4 1/4 in (108.0 mm)
237 cu in (3,878 cc)	1950	112	DeSoto S-All	3 7/16 in (87.3 mm)	4 1/4 in (108.0 mm)
237 cu in (3,878 cc)	1951	112	DeSoto S-All	3 7/16 in (87.3 mm)	4 1/4 in (108.0 mm)
242 cu in (3,958 cc)	1929	78	Dodge Series S	3 3/8 in (85.7 mm)	4 1/2 in (114.3 mm)
242 cu in (3,958 cc)	1929-1930	78	Dodge Series DB	3 3/8 in (85.7 mm)	4 1/2 in (114.3 mm)
242 cu in (3,958 cc)	1934	100	DeSoto Series SE (aka Chrysler CY/Croydon, until 1936 in UK)	3 3/8 in (85.7 mm)	4 1/2 in (114.3 mm)
242 cu in (3,958 cc)	1934	93 (std.); 100 (opt.)	Chrysler Series CA/CB	3 3/8 in (85.7 mm)	4 1/2 in (114.3 mm)
242 cu in (3,958 cc)	1935	93	DeSoto Series SF	3 3/8 in (85.7 mm)	4 1/2 in (114.3 mm)
242 cu in (3,958 cc)	1935	100	DeSoto Series SG	3 3/8 in (85.7 mm)	4 1/2 in (114.3 mm)
242 cu in (3,958 cc)	1935	100	Chrysler O-C-6	3 3/8 in (85.7 mm)	4 1/2 in (114.3 mm)
242 cu in (3,958 cc)	1935	93	Chrysler S-C-6	3 3/8 in (85.7 mm)	4 1/2 in (114.3 mm)
242 cu in (3,958 cc)	1936	93	DeSoto Airstream Series S-1	3 3/8 in (85.7 mm)	4 1/2 in (114.3 mm)
242 cu in (3,958 cc)	1936	100	DeSoto Airflow Series S-2	3 3/8 in (85.7 mm)	4 1/2 in (114.3 mm)
242 cu in (3,958 cc)	1936	93 (std.); 100 (opt.)	Chrysler Series C-7	3 3/8 in (85.7 mm)	4 1/2 in (114.3 mm)
242 cu in (3,958 cc)	1938	95 (std.); 102 (opt.)	Chrysler Series C-18	3 3/8 in (85.7 mm)	4 1/2 in (114.3 mm)
242 cu in (3,958 cc)	1939	100 (std.); 107 (opt.)	Chrysler Series C-22	3 3/8 in (85.7 mm)	4 1/2 in (114.3 mm)
242 cu in (3,958 cc)	1940	108 (std.); 112 (opt.)	Chrysler Royal/Windsor	3 3/8 in (85.7 mm)	4 1/2 in (114.3 mm)
242 cu in (3,958 cc)	1941	108; 112; 115 (opt.)	Chrysler Royal; Chrysler Windsor; Chrysler Royal/Windsor	3 3/8 in (85.7 mm)	4 1/2 in (114.3 mm)
249 cu in (4,078 cc)	1928	75 (std.); 85 (opt.)	Chrysler Series 72	3 1/4 in (82.6 mm)	5 in (127.0 mm)
249 cu in (4,078 cc)	1929	75 (std.); 84 (opt.)	Chrysler Series 75	3 1/4 in (82.6 mm)	5 in (127.0 mm)
251 cu in (4,106 cc)	1942	120	Chrysler Royal/Windsor (C-34)	3 7/16 in (87.3 mm)	4 1/2 in (114.3 mm)
251 cu in (4,106 cc)	1946-1949	114	Chrysler Royal/Windsor (C38)	3 7/16 in (87.3 mm)	4 1/2 in (114.3 mm)
251 cu in (4,106 cc)	1949	116	Chrysler Royal/Windsor (C45)	3 7/16 in (87.3 mm)	4 1/2 in (114.3 mm)
251 cu in (4,106 cc)	1950	116	Chrysler Royal/Windsor (C48)	3 7/16 in (87.3 mm)	4 1/2 in (114.3 mm)
251 cu in (4,106 cc)	1951-1952	116	DeSoto Deluxe/Custom (S15)	3 7/16 in (87.3 mm)	4 1/2 in (114.3 mm)
251 cu in (4,106 cc)	1951	116	Chrysler Windsor, Deluxe (C51)	3 7/16 in (87.3 mm)	4 1/2 in (114.3 mm)
251 cu in (4,106 cc)	1953	116	DeSoto Powermaster (S18)	3 7/16 in (87.3 mm)	4 1/2 in (114.3 mm)
251 cu in (4,106 cc)	1954	116	DeSoto Powermaster (S20)	3 7/16 in (87.3 mm)	4 1/2 in (114.3 mm)
251 cu in (4,106 cc)	1957-1958	117	Chrysler Royal/Chrysler Plainsman AP1 (AUS-made)	3 7/16 in (87.3 mm)	4 1/2 in (114.3 mm)
251 cu in (4,106 cc)	1958-1959	117	Chrysler Plainsman AP2 (AUS-made)	3 7/16 in (87.3 mm)	4 1/2 in (114.3 mm)
251 cu in (4,106 cc)	1958-1960	117	Chrysler Royal/Chrysler Wayfarer AP2 (AUS-made)	3 7/16 in (87.3 mm)	4 1/2 in (114.3 mm)
251 cu in (4,106 cc)	1960-1961	117	Chrysler Wayfarer AP3 (AUS-made)	3 7/16 in (87.3 mm)	4 1/2 in (114.3 mm)
251 cu in (4,106 cc)	1960-1964	117	Chrysler Royal AP3 (AUS-made)	3 7/16 in (87.3 mm)	4 1/2 in (114.3 mm)
264.5 cu in (4,334 cc)	1952	119	Chrysler Windsor, Deluxe (C51)	3 7/16 in (87.3 mm)	4 3/4 in (120.7 mm)
264.5 cu in (4,334 cc)	1953	119	Chrysler Windsor, Deluxe (C60)	3 7/16 in (87.3 mm)	4 3/4 in (120.7 mm)
264.5 cu in (4,334 cc)	1954	119	Chrysler Windsor Deluxe (C62)	3 7/16 in (87.3 mm)	4 3/4 in (120.7 mm)
268 cu in (4,398 cc)	1930-1932	93	Chrysler Series 70	3 3/8 in (85.7 mm)	5 in (127.0 mm)
268 cu in (4,398 cc)	1930	93	Chrysler Series 77	3 3/8 in (85.7 mm)	5 in (127.0 mm)
289 cu in (4,730 cc)	1926	92	Chrysler Imperial Series E-80	3 1/2 in (88.9 mm)	5 in (127.0 mm)
289 cu in (4,730 cc)	1927	92	Chrysler Imperial Series 80	3 1/2 in (88.9 mm)	5 in (127.0 mm)
310 cu in (5,074 cc)	1928	100 (std.); 112 (opt.)	Chrysler Imperial Series 80L	3 5/8 in (92.1 mm)	5 in (127.0 mm)
310 cu in (5,074 cc)	1929-1930	100 (std.); 112 (opt.)	Chrysler Imperial Series L-80	3 5/8 in (92.1 mm)	5 in (127.0 mm)
331 cu in (5,430 cc)	1937-1940	100	Dodge ML/RL-50/53, Dodge MK/RK-60/63, Dodge RX-70/71, Dodge DB8, Dodge VL/VLA-50, Dodge VK/VKA-60/63	3 3/4 in (95.3 mm)	5 in (127.0 mm)
331 cu in (5,430 cc)	1940-1942	110	Dodge DC8, DD-8; Dodge WK, WL	3 3/4 in (95.3 mm)	5 in (127.0 mm)
331 cu in (5,430 cc)	1946-1953	128 (std.)	Dodge WK/WR, Dodge B-1-T/TA/V/VA, Dodge B-2/3/4-T/TL/TA/TAL, Dodge B-2/3/4-V/VL/VA/VAL, Dodge B-1/2/3-VX, Dodge DE/DF/DG-8/9, Dodge DH-9/10	3 3/4 in (95.3 mm)	5 in (127.0 mm)
331 cu in (5,430 cc)	1951-1953	145 (2 carb. opt.)	Dodge B-2/3/4-T/TL/TA/TAL, Dodge B-2/3/4-V/VL/VA/VAL, Dodge B-1/2/3-VX, Dodge DG-8/9, Dodge DH-9/10	3 3/4 in (95.3 mm)	5 in (127.0 mm)
282 cu in (4,615 cc)	1946-1947	115	Dodge WJ	3 3/4 in (95.3 mm)	4 1/4 in (108.0 mm)
282 cu in (4,615 cc)	1948-1949	115	Dodge B-1-R/RA/RS, Dodge DE-7	3 3/4 in (95.3 mm)	4 1/4 in (108.0 mm)
306 cu in (5,022 cc)	1950-1953	122 (std.)	Dodge B-2/3/4-R/RL/RA/RAL/RS, Dodge DF/DG-7, DH-8	3 3/4 in (95.3 mm)	4 5/16 in (109.5 mm)
306 cu in (5,022 cc)	1951-1953	137 (2 carb. opt.)	Dodge B-2/3/4-R/RL/RA/RAL/RS, Dodge DG-7, DH-8	3 3/4 in (95.3 mm)	4 5/16 in (109.5 mm)
377 cu in (6,178 cc)	1950-1953	154 std. w/2 carb.	Dodge B-2/3/4-Y/YA/YX	4 in (101.6 mm)	5 in (127.0 mm)
413 cu in (6,771 cc)	1954-1956	171 std. w/2 carb.	Dodge C-1-Y/YA/YX, Dodge DH-11/12, Dodge C-3-Y6/YL6/YA6/YAL6/YX6/YXL6	4 1/16 in (103.2 mm)	5 5/16 in (134.9 mm)

== Straight-8 ==
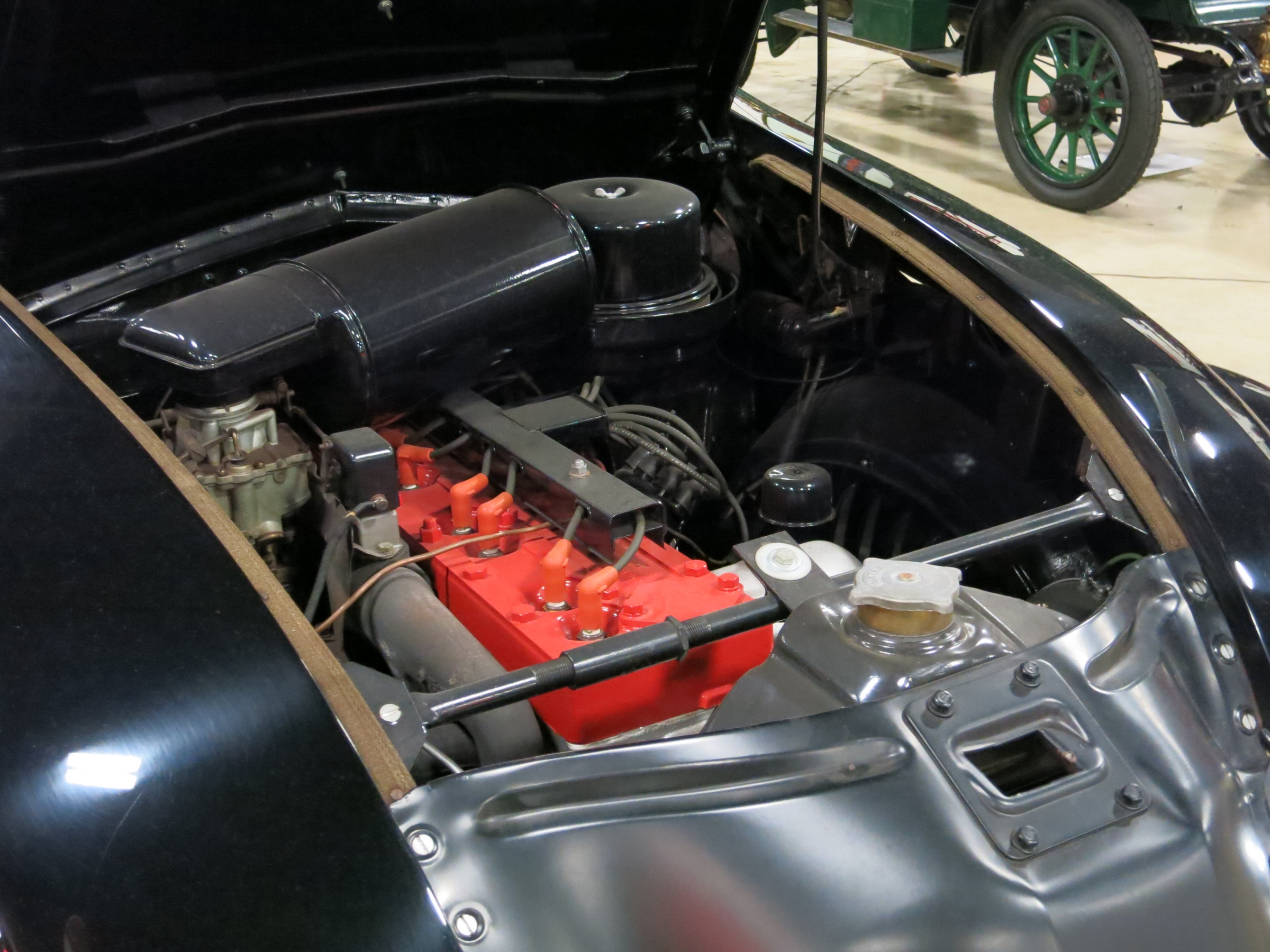
The 323.5 cuin straight-eight in a 1937 Chrysler Airflow

The new straight-8 engine is largely based on the six-cylinder engine that appeared on the Desoto Model K. It has five main bearings, the central one being wider. When the engineers had to rebore the cylinders to 3-1/2 inches, the space between each pair of cylinders was modified. This applies to all blocks with the same bore.

In the case of the Imperial (CG, CH), then Custom imperial (CL, CW), a new 9 main bearing straight-8 engine was developed, equipped with a two-barrel downdraft carburetor. From the CW model, the cylinder head is made of aluminum. It also powered the Dodge Trucks G-80 models (1931-1934) and Fargo buses (1930-1932).

Displacement	Years	Horsepower	Applications	Bore	Stroke
208 cu in (3,404 cc)	1930-1931	70	DeSoto Series CF	2 7/8 in (73.0 mm)	4 in (101.6 mm)
221 cu in (3,617 cc)	1930-1932	75	Dodge Series DC (discontinued September 1931)	2 7/8 in (73.0 mm)	4 1/4 in (108.0 mm)
221 cu in (3,617 cc)	1931-1932	77	DeSoto Series CF	2 7/8 in (73.0 mm)	4 1/4 in (108.0 mm)
240 cu in (3,938 cc)	1931-1932	84	Dodge Series DG	3 in (76.2 mm)	4 1/4 in (108.0 mm)
240 cu in (3,938 cc)	1931	80	Chrysler Series CD (until January 1931)	3 in (76.2 mm)	4 1/4 in (108.0 mm)
261 cu in (4,273 cc)	1931	88	Chrysler Series CD (from January 1931)	3 1/8 in (79.4 mm)	4 1/4 in (108.0 mm)
274 cu in (4,486 cc)	1933	90 (std.); 98 (opt.)	Chrysler Series CT	3 1/4 in (82.6 mm)	4 1/8 in (104.8 mm)
274 cu in (4,486 cc)	1935	105 (std.); 110 (opt.)	Chrysler Series CZ	3 1/4 in (82.6 mm)	4 1/8 in (104.8 mm)
274 cu in (4,486 cc)	1936	105 (std.); 110 (opt.)	Chrysler Series C-8	3 1/4 in (82.6 mm)	4 1/8 in (104.8 mm)
274 cu in (4,486 cc)	1937	110 (std.); 115 (opt.)	Chrysler Imperial Series C-14	3 1/4 in (82.6 mm)	4 1/8 in (104.8 mm)
282 cu in (4,622 cc)	1931	100	Chrysler DeLuxe CD Series	3 1/4 in (82.6 mm)	4 1/4 in (108.0 mm)
282 cu in (4,622 cc)	1932	100	Chrysler Series CD	3 1/4 in (82.6 mm)	4 1/4 in (108.0 mm)
282 cu in (4,622 cc)	1932	90 (std.); 100 (opt.)	Dodge Series DK	3 1/4 in (82.6 mm)	4 1/4 in (108.0 mm)
282 cu in (4,622 cc)	1933	100 (std.); 94 (opt.)	Dodge Series DO	3 1/4 in (82.6 mm)	4 1/4 in (108.0 mm)
299 cu in (4,894 cc)	1932	100	Chrysler Series CP (Chrysler Hurlingham in the UK)	3 1/4 in (82.6 mm)	4 1/2 in (114.3 mm)
299 cu in (4,894 cc)	1933	100 (std.); 108 (opt.)	Chrysler Imperial Series CQ	3 1/4 in (82.6 mm)	4 1/2 in (114.3 mm)
299 cu in (4,894 cc)	1934	122	Chrysler Series CU	3 1/4 in (82.6 mm)	4 1/2 in (114.3 mm)
299 cu in (4,894 cc)	1938	110 (std.); 122 (opt.)	Chrysler Series C-19; Dodge Custom Eight (UK)	3 1/4 in (82.6 mm)	4 1/2 in (114.3 mm)
324 cu in (5,302 cc)	1934	130	Chrysler Imperial/Custom Imperial Series CV/CX	3 1/4 in (82.6 mm)	4 7/8 in (123.8 mm)
324 cu in (5,302 cc)	1935	115 (std.); 120 (opt.)	Chrysler Series C-1	3 1/4 in (82.6 mm)	4 7/8 in (123.8 mm)
324 cu in (5,302 cc)	1935	130 (std.); 138 (opt.)	Chrysler Imperial Series C-2/C-3	3 1/4 in (82.6 mm)	4 7/8 in (123.8 mm)
324 cu in (5,302 cc)	1936	115	Chrysler Series C-9	3 1/4 in (82.6 mm)	4 7/8 in (123.8 mm)
324 cu in (5,302 cc)	1936	130	Chrysler Imperial Series C-10/C-11	3 1/4 in (82.6 mm)	4 7/8 in (123.8 mm)
324 cu in (5,302 cc)	1937	130 (std.); 138 (opt.)	Chrysler Imperial Custom/Airflow Series C-15/C-17	3 1/4 in (82.6 mm)	4 7/8 in (123.8 mm)
324 cu in (5,302 cc)	1938	130 (std.); 138 (opt.)	Chrysler Custom Imperial Series C-20	3 1/4 in (82.6 mm)	4 7/8 in (123.8 mm)
324 cu in (5,302 cc)	1939	130	Chrysler Series C-23	3 1/4 in (82.6 mm)	4 7/8 in (123.8 mm)
324 cu in (5,302 cc)	1939	132 (std.); 138 (opt.)	Chrysler Series C-24	3 1/4 in (82.6 mm)	4 7/8 in (123.8 mm)
324 cu in (5,302 cc)	1940	132; 135; 143 (opt.)	Chrysler C-27; Chrysler C-26; Chrysler C-26/C-27	3 1/4 in (82.6 mm)	4 7/8 in (123.8 mm)
324 cu in (5,302 cc)	1941	137	Chrysler C-30	3 1/4 in (82.6 mm)	4 7/8 in (123.8 mm)
324 cu in (5,302 cc)	1941	140	Chrysler C-30 (opt.)/C-33	3 1/4 in (82.6 mm)	4 7/8 in (123.8 mm)
324 cu in (5,302 cc)	1942	140	Chrysler C-36/C-37	3 1/4 in (82.6 mm)	4 7/8 in (123.8 mm)
324 cu in (5,302 cc)	1946-1950	135	Chrysler Saratoga/New Yorker/Imperial	3 1/4 in (82.6 mm)	4 7/8 in (123.8 mm)
385 cu in (6,306 cc)	1931-1932	125	Chrysler Series CG	3 1/2 in (88.9 mm)	5 in (127.0 mm)
385 cu in (6,306 cc)	1932	125	Chrysler Imperial/Custom Imperial CH/CL	3 1/2 in (88.9 mm)	5 in (127.0 mm)
385 cu in (6,306 cc)	1933	125 (std.); 135 (opt.)	Chrysler Custom Imperial CL	3 1/2 in (88.9 mm)	5 in (127.0 mm)
385 cu in (6,306 cc)	1934-1935	150	Chrysler Custom Imperial Series CW	3 1/2 in (88.9 mm)	5 in (127.0 mm)

== See also ==
- List of Chrysler engines
