= Girl car =

Car model associated with women

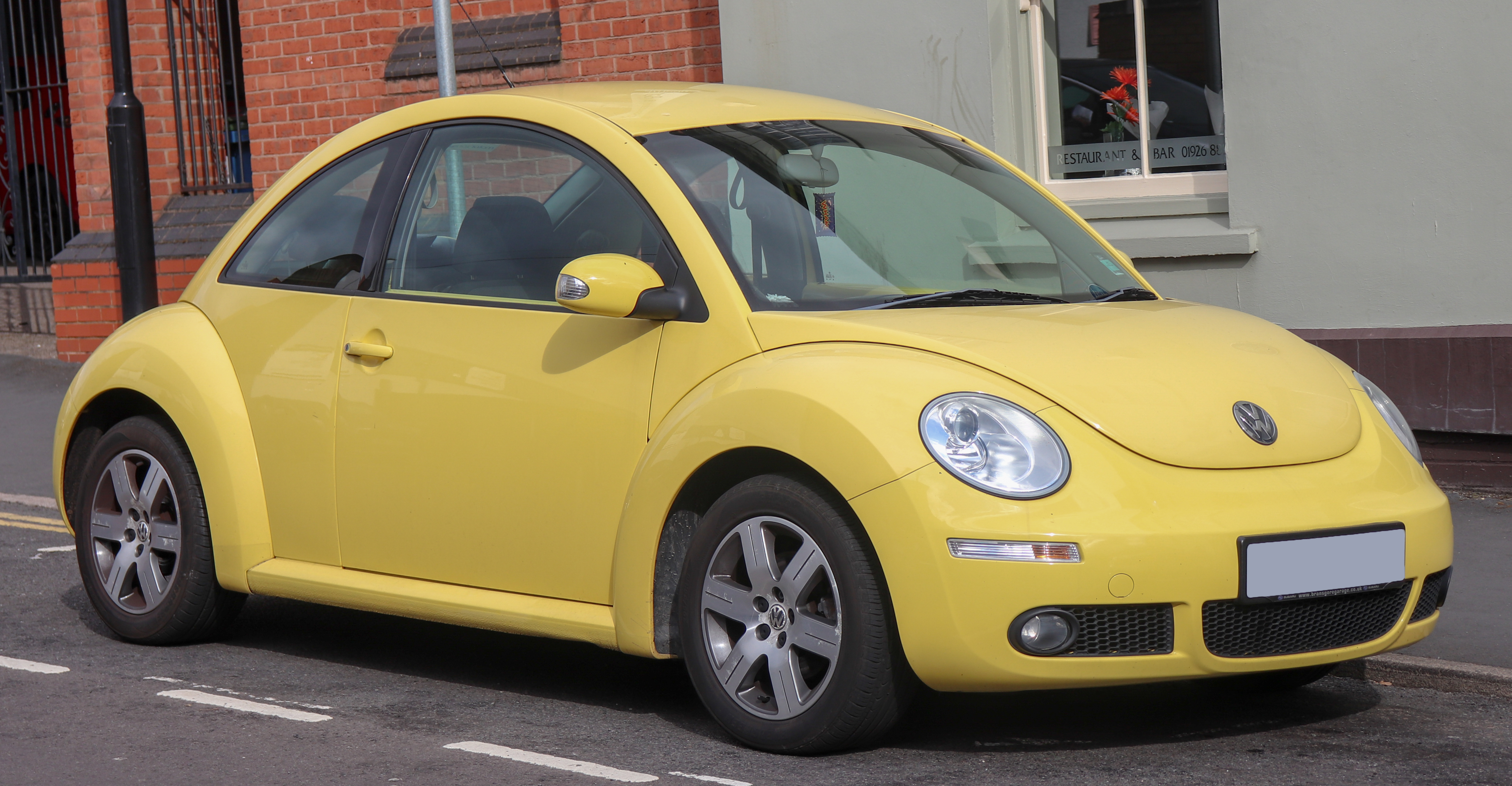
A Volkswagen New Beetle, which frequently ranked as the car with the highest percentage of female buyers during its run from 1998 to 2010.

A girl car, girl's car or chick car refers to an automobile model that is perceived to be preferred by women drivers. The girl car is diverged from the concept of the "woman's car", which was rooted in the traditional role of women as wives and mothers. The car that women drove was a family vehicle, a utilitarian second vehicle built for children and cargo. These were the station wagons of the 1950s and 60s, that evolved into minivans and hatchbacks of the 80s, and then into the modern SUVs. According to historian Virginia Scharff, this traditional categorization of cars into masculine and female roles trivialized women drivers.

Few cars have been specifically designed for and marketed to women exclusively. The first automobile designed specifically for the women's market was the Dodge La Femme, a customized version of the 1955 and 1956 Dodge Custom Royal Lancer models.

Examples of cars that have features that appeal to women and are associated with that gender include the Volkswagen New Beetle, which consistently ranked as the most female-skewing car during its production run, with women accounting for nearly 70% of its buyers, and the Peugeot 206 cc, of which 88% of buyers were female.

In 2004, a female team of designers unveiled a Volvo S60-based concept car that was designed to appeal to female drivers.
