= D500 =

D500 may refer to:

- Dodge D500, a variant of the Chrysler B engine
- D500 road (Croatia)
- Dewoitine D.500, an aircraft
- Dodge D-500 (disambiguation), a performance model automobile
- Durrum D-500, an amino acid analyser
- Nikon D500, a 20.9 megapixel DSLR camera
- Samsung SGH-D500, a mobile phone
- Dell Latitude D500, a laptop
