= Yank tank =

Slang term referring to American cars

Yank tank is a slang term referring to American cars, especially large models produced in the 1950s and 1960s as well as SUVs of recent production.

== Classic American cars in Cuba ==
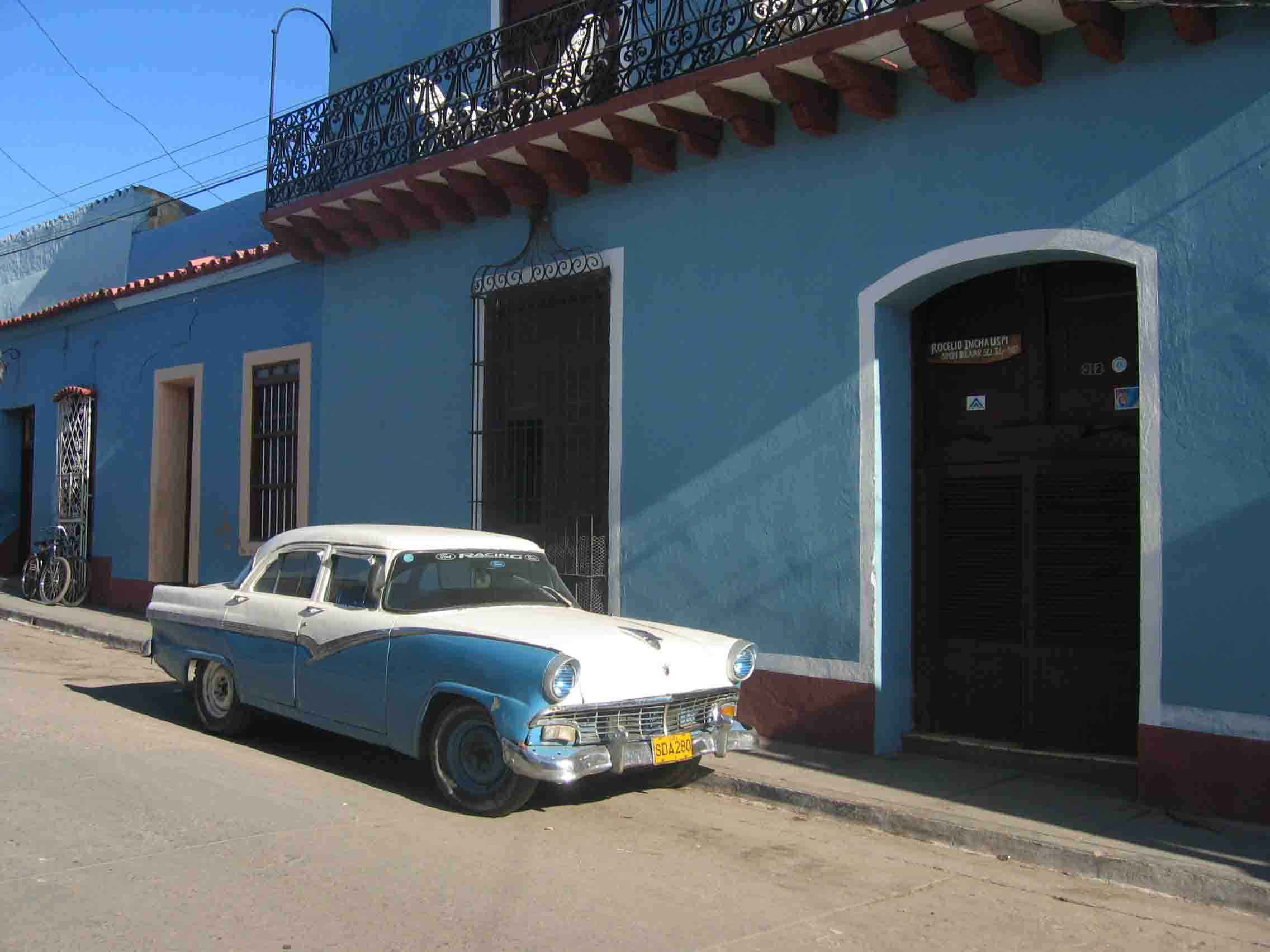
A so-called 'yank tank' or 'máquina' (1956 Ford) in Trinidad, Cuba.

Yank tank, máquina and mainly almendrón (big almond) are the words used to describe the many classic cars (for example: 1957 Chevrolet, 1953 Ford, 1958 Dodge, etc.) present in Cuba with an estimated 60,000 of them still driving the roads today. In 1962 a United States embargo against Cuba was introduced, effectively cutting trade between the two countries. This meant that the cars in Cuba could no longer receive new replacement parts when something broke. Currently, the only way to keep these cars on the road today is by using Cuban ingenuity to adapt household products and Soviet technology into these vehicles. If a car is unable to be repaired at the time, the car is usually either “parked” for future repair or “parted out” (to produce extra income for the owner’s family) so that other cars can remain on the road. During the years of Soviet Union influence on Cuba, Ladas, Moskvitchs and Volgas became the main cars imported by the communist regime, mainly for state use. As a result of these internal economic restrictions, to this day there is no such thing as a new or used private European or Asian automotive dealership branch in Cuba for independent purchasing by regular Cubans.

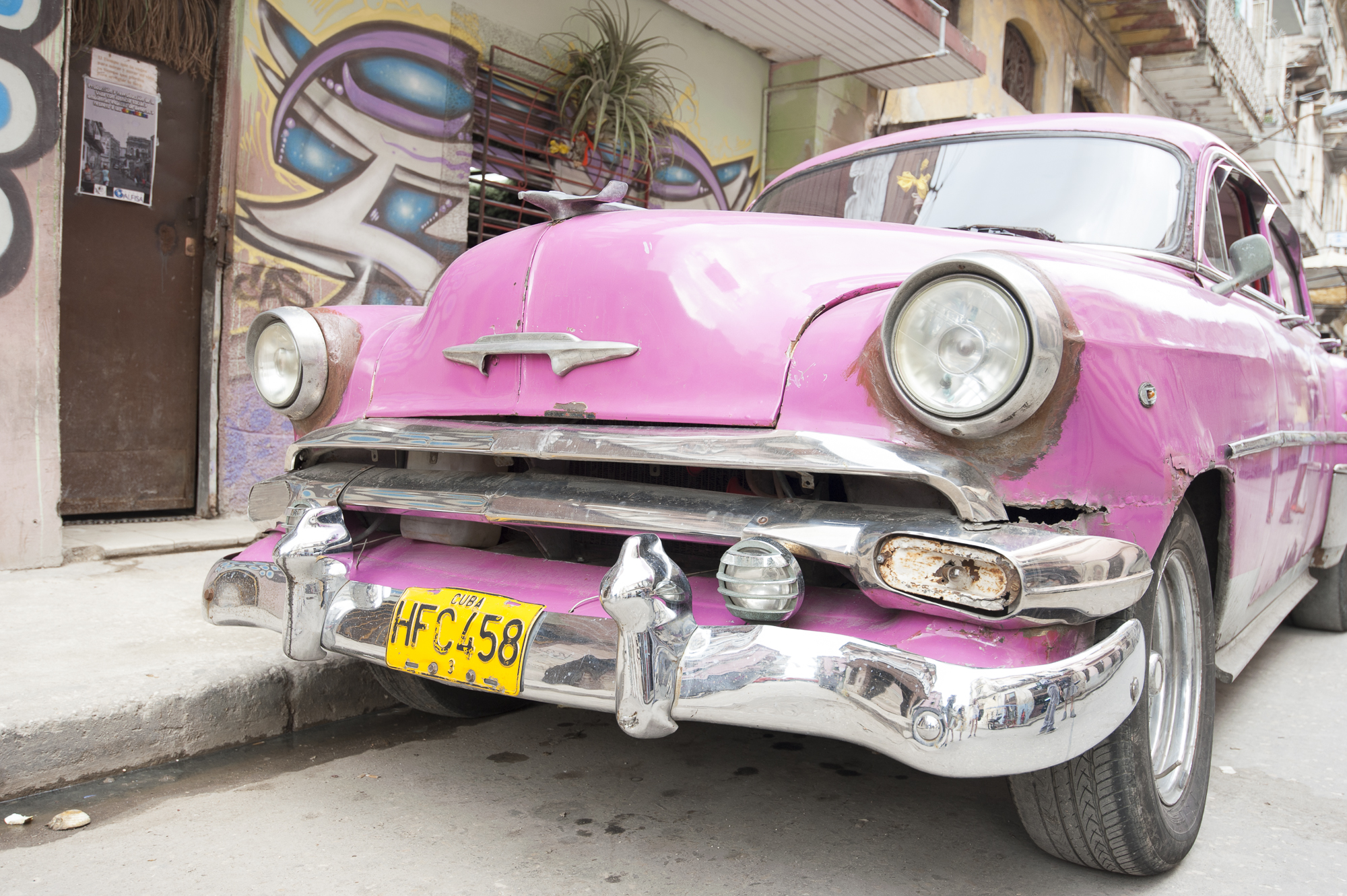
Pink Chevy, January 2014

The only American cars that can be purchased for private use in Cuba (with “particular” plates) are those that were previously registered for private use and acquired before the revolution. However, if the owner does not have the proper paper work called a traspaso, the vehicle cannot be legally sold.

US cars that were present at the time of the embargo have been preserved through care and ingenuity. Since there were many of these, due to the presence of a past strong Cuban middle-class, classic cars have been the standard, rather than an exception in Cuba. Even President Fulgencio Batista’s son owned a 1956 Corvette. Due to the constant good care, many remain in good working order. The owners of these yank tanks are sitting on a potential “gold mine” and, if the embargo were to be lifted, the Cuban people could make quick cash by selling their cars to people who collect and restore them.

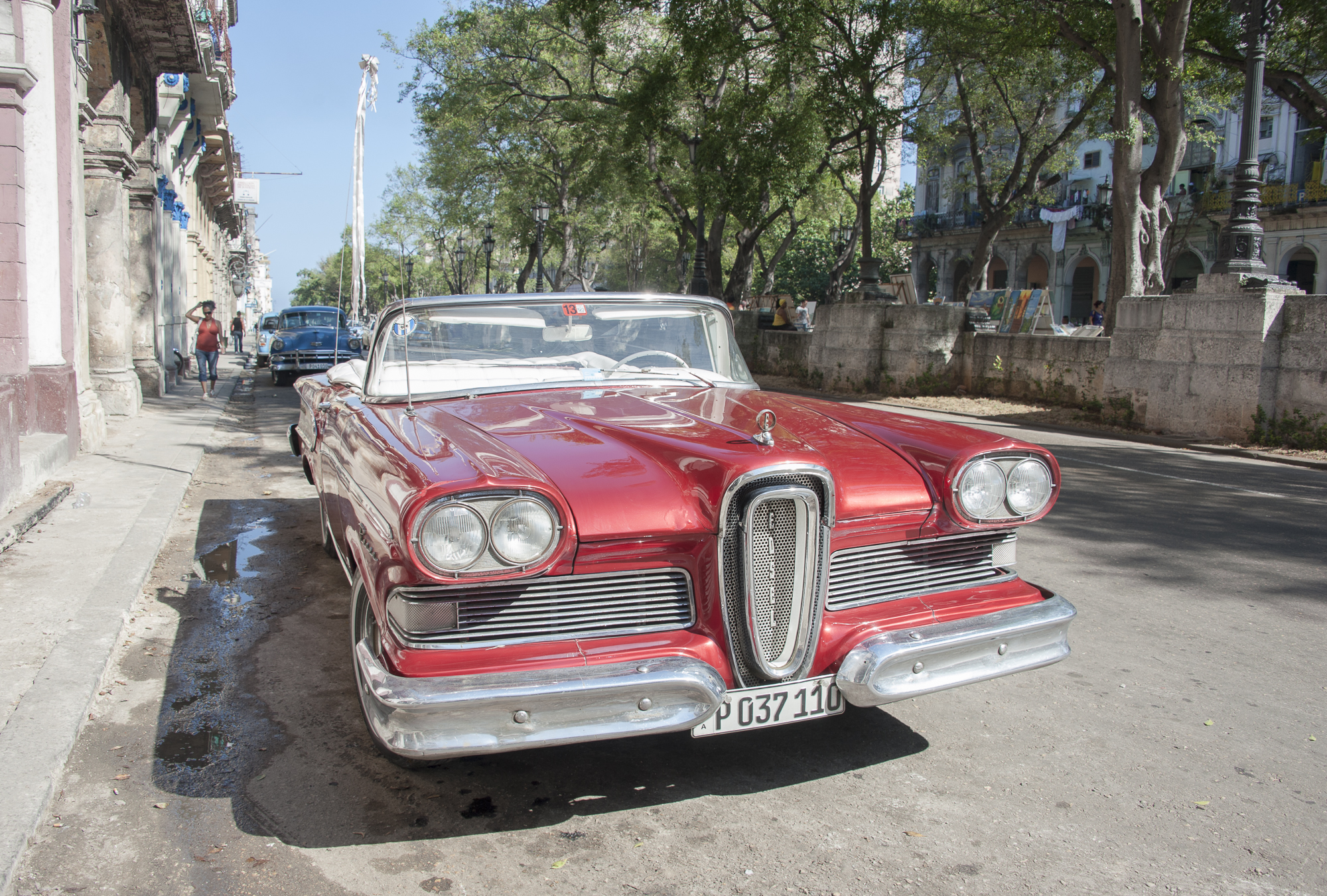
Edsel Pacer in Havana, January 2014

On the other hand, many of these vehicles, especially those in taxi service, have been converted to accept replacement engines, usually Soviet diesel engines. The practical limits of engine longevity, scarcity of replacement parts, and the high cost of fuel in post Cold War Cuba (roughly 75 U.S. cents a liter in the summer of 2002) have made diesel power (roughly 15 to 20 U.S. cents) a popular choice for engine replacement, if a suitable gasoline engine could not be acquired.

However, the old American cars on the road today have “relatively high inefficiencies” due in large part to the lack of modern technology. This has resulted in increased fuel consumption as well as adding to the economic plight of its owners. With these inefficiencies, noticeable drop in travel has occurred from an “average of nearly 3000 km/year in the mid-1980s to less than 800 km/year in 2000–2001”. As the Cuban people try to save as much money as possible, when traveling is done, the cars are usually loaded past the maximum allowable weight and travel on the decaying roads, resulting in even more abuse to the already under maintained vehicles.

The extreme lack or scarcity of parts is directly a result of the Revolution and the embargo. However, there have been talks about easing some of the restriction of the embargo. Former President Clinton has pushed for U.S. citizens to be allowed to send up to $300 a month to Cuba and for “direct mail service between Cuba and the United States, suspended in 1963, to be reestablished.” This would allow for families in the U.S. to send the needed parts (assuming they can be located) to their own families in Cuba, for the necessary repairs.

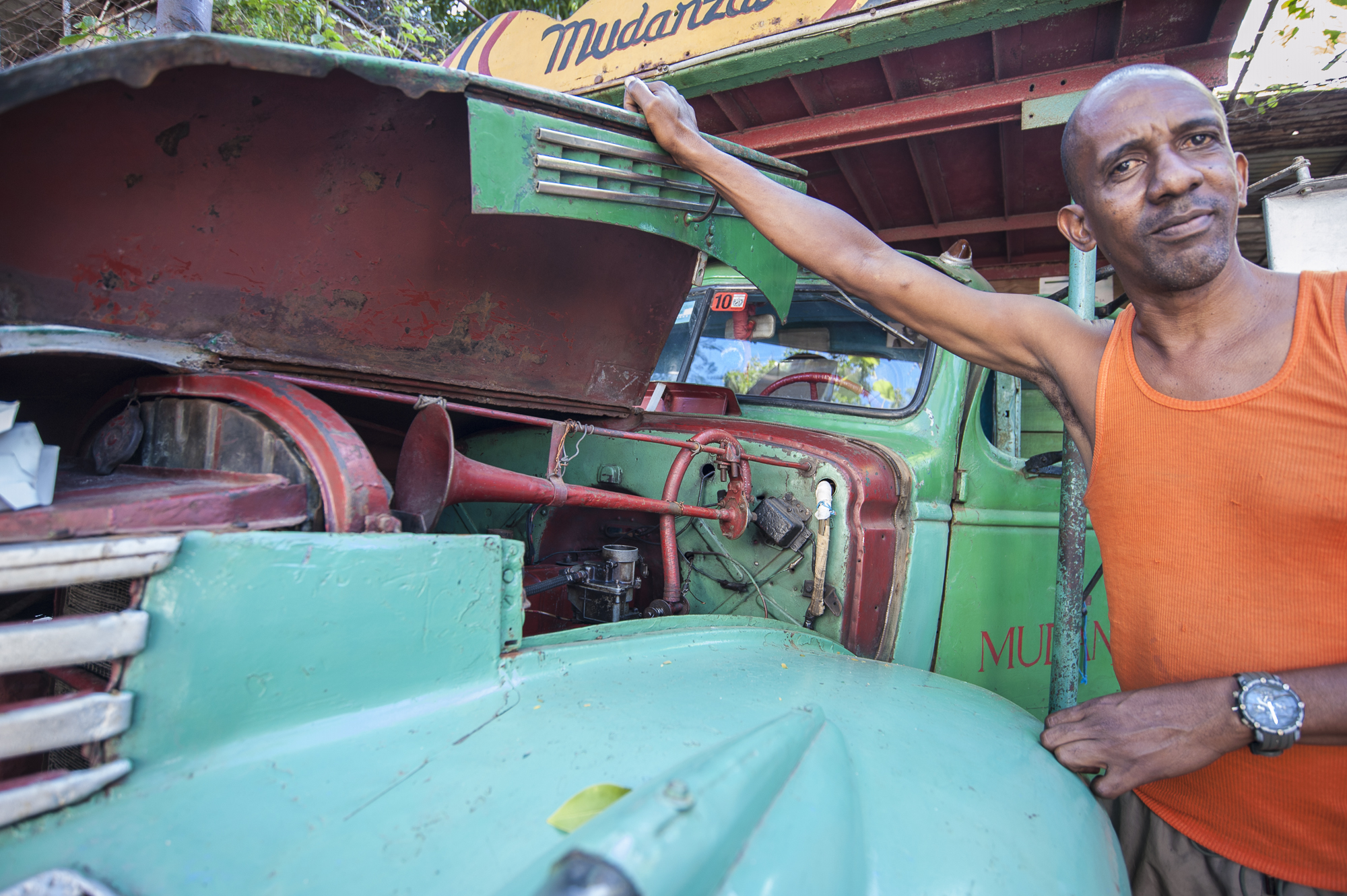
Antique Ford Truck, January 2014

Currently, it is estimated that there are some 173,000 cars in Cuba, of these it is unknown how many are yank tanks and are considered road worthy.

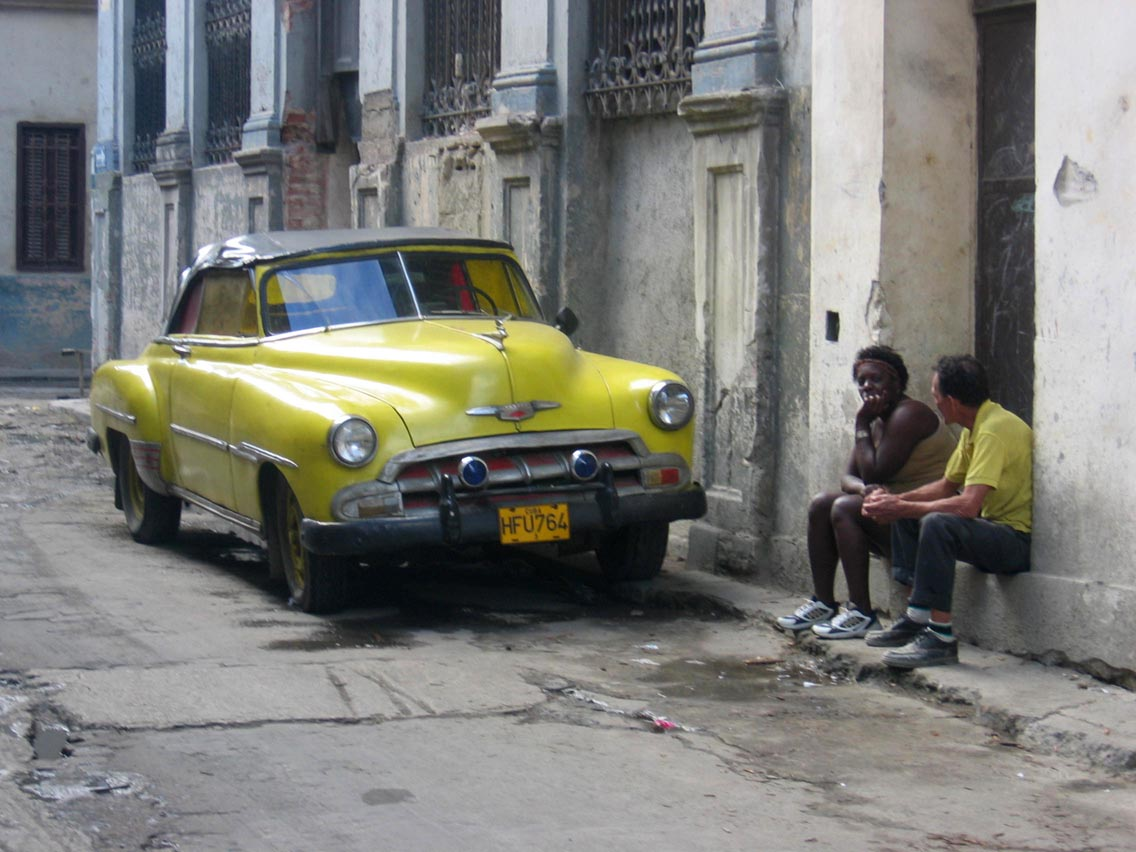
1952 Chevrolet in Havana

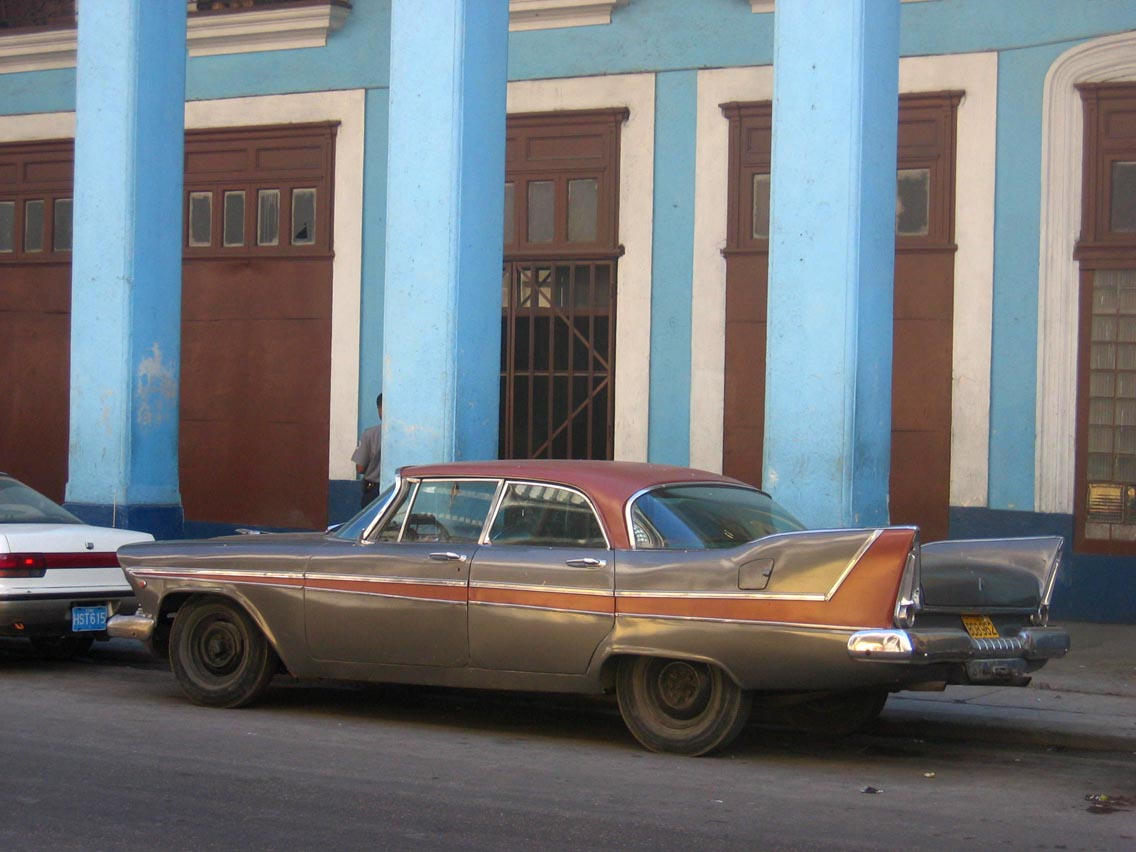
1958 Plymouth Belvedere in Havana

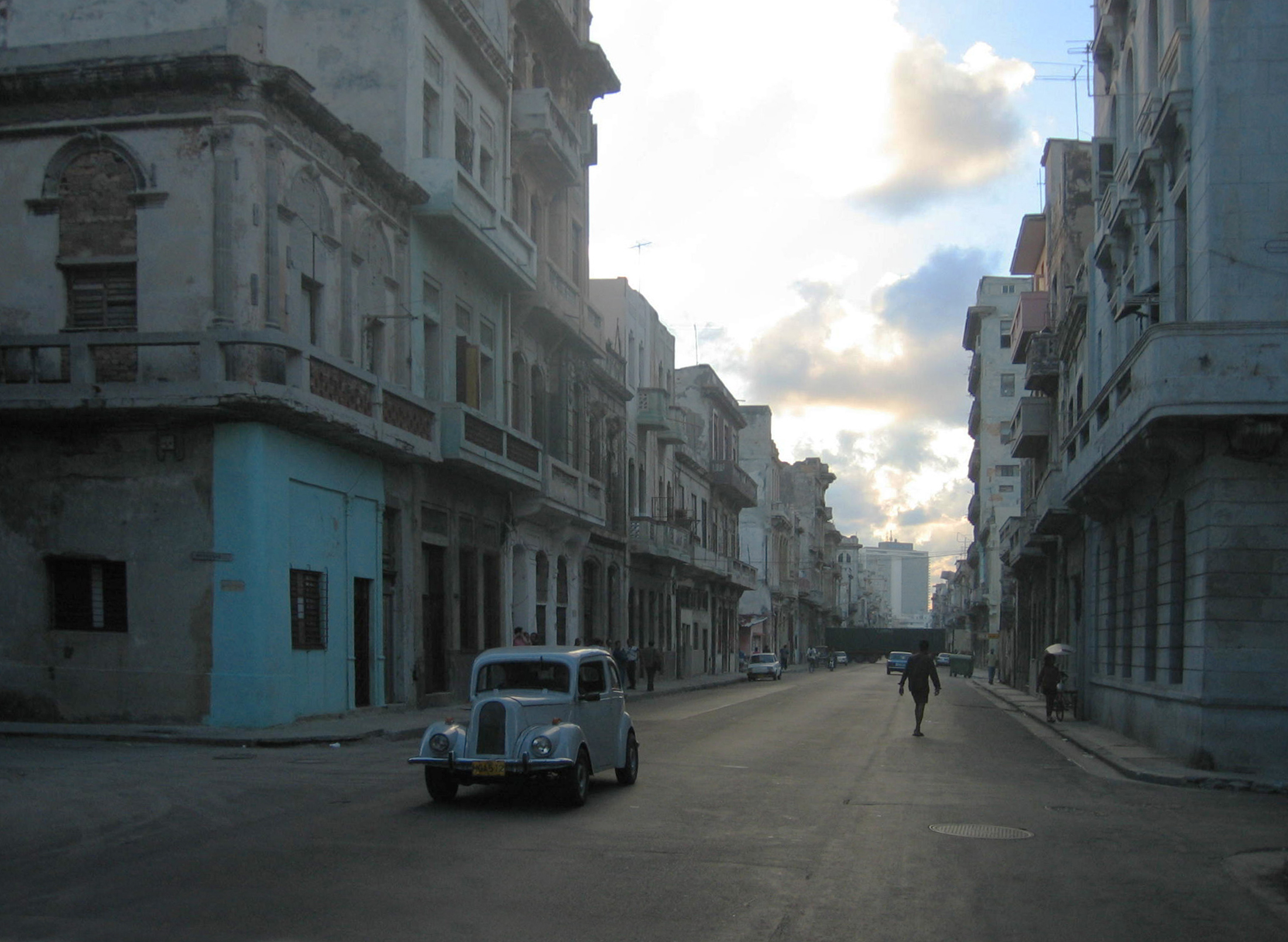
British Ford Anglia in Havana

== American cars in the British Commonwealth ==
The term yank tank is also used in Australian slang to describe these cars, but more generally to describe any American car considered to be large and unwieldy - including both classics (such as Cadillacs) and modern SUVs. The term entered the general vocabulary in Britain during the Second World War and especially the decade afterwards, when some American military servicemen stationed in Britain imported cars from the USA.

This happened at a time when American cars reached their largest sizes and most extravagant styling, leading to the term "Yank Tank" in relation to the cars' bulk and unwieldy size on typically narrow, winding British roads. This difference was especially great because British cars of the "Austerity Years" in the late 1940s and early 1950s were generally small and low-powered, with low equipment levels and disciplined styling in comparison.

The use of the term however no longer occurs in the UK as European and Asian cars have reached larger sizes and more extravagant styling, while very few US models are sold in the UK.

== See also ==
- Land yacht (automobile)
