= Dodge D-500 =

D-500 was a performance model Dodge automobile first offered in 1956. The name was also used on a medium-duty Dodge truck in the sixties and seventies.

== 1956 ==
The 1956 D-500 was a high-performance model derived from the standard 1956 Dodge but differing in many ways. It included a heavy duty suspension and other chassis upgrades from the New Yorker and Imperial lines, upgraded brakes, and a high-performance 315 in³ (5.2 L) Hemi-head V8. A four-barrel Carter carburetor pushed output to 260 hp (194 kW) and 330 lb·ft (447 N·m). The 3-speed manual transmission was standard, with the PowerFlite 2-speed automatic as an option. A rare NASCAR-specific option was the D-500-1(Dash-1), which upped power to 285 hp (213 kW). The D-500 originally used only the Coronet 2-door sedan and Royal Lancer hardtop and convertible bodies.

- 1958-1961 D-500
- Dodge D Series truck
