= Durrum D-500 =

Amino acid analyser

The D-500 Amino Acid Analyzer was designed and built by Durrum Instruments in the late 1960s. It was used by many prestigious universities and research facilities to test for presence and quantity of amino acids in biological samples. At that time, Durrum was located on Fabian Way, Palo Alto, California, which was the birthplace of many high-tech companies. The D-500 operates using ion exchange chromatography.

== Operation ==
A sample is first rendered into liquid form by a technician. A small amount of this liquid (typically of the order of tens of microliters) is then injected into a holder filled with super-fine resin beads made by Diamond Shamrock; the holder is then manually inserted into the analyzer.

The D-500 is controlled by a PDP-8 computer which controls an electrical pump with a piston made of synthetic ruby to facilitate a very precise flow of hydraulic fluid to drive a mechanical ram assembly - this assembly has eight syringes, four on each side, each filled with a different pH liquid buffer. The buffer solutions were then washed across the sample holder and into another resin bead-filled tube which had an inside diameter of the order of fifty micrometres (about the diameter of a human hair).

The PDP-8 is also used to control the temperature of the separation tube. Since different amino acids have different molecular weights and sizes, they are washed through the separation tube at different speeds. At the bottom end of the separation tube, the effluent is mixed with ninhydrin, a chemical that changes color in the presence of amines, a component part of amino acids.

A colorimeter passes a precisely controlled wavelength light through a series of lenses and the effluent to a light sensor on the other side of the fluid stream. The output of the colorimeter is then fed back to the computer for processing. The output consists of a printout to the teletype and a graph drawn by a pen and ink recorder.

Once the process is complete, the computer determines the time and the percentage of each amino acid present as they exited the separation tube.

Since different molecules pass through the resin tube at various speeds, graphing the output of the colorimeter against time indicates which amino acid is present. The amount of light passing through the colorimeter determines the percentage of change from the base line, the latter being set during calibration.

== Calibration ==
Each separation tube had to be installed by a factory-trained technician, and recalibration required days of testing and calculating baselines. Once calibrated, the results of the analysis can be affected by:

1. the volume of buffer flow (which changes the separation times between various amino acids - controlled by the speed of the ruby-piston pump); flow is also affected by the inside diameter of the tube, the size of the resin beads, and how tightly they are packed inside the tube.
2. the size of the sample (controlled by the technician preparing the sample)
3. the temperature of the resin-bead tube
4. the volume of ninhydrin added to the effluent
5. the pH of the buffer being used to wash the sample through the resin-beads

All these factors require careful control and monitoring.

=== Minor design issues ===
- The original design used a calcium citrate washing buffer.
- When Lamont–Doherty Labs began testing amino acids from shells, residue from the samples, when heated, became chalk, which clogged the tubing. Changing to lithium citrate eliminated this problem.
