= Dodge La Femme =

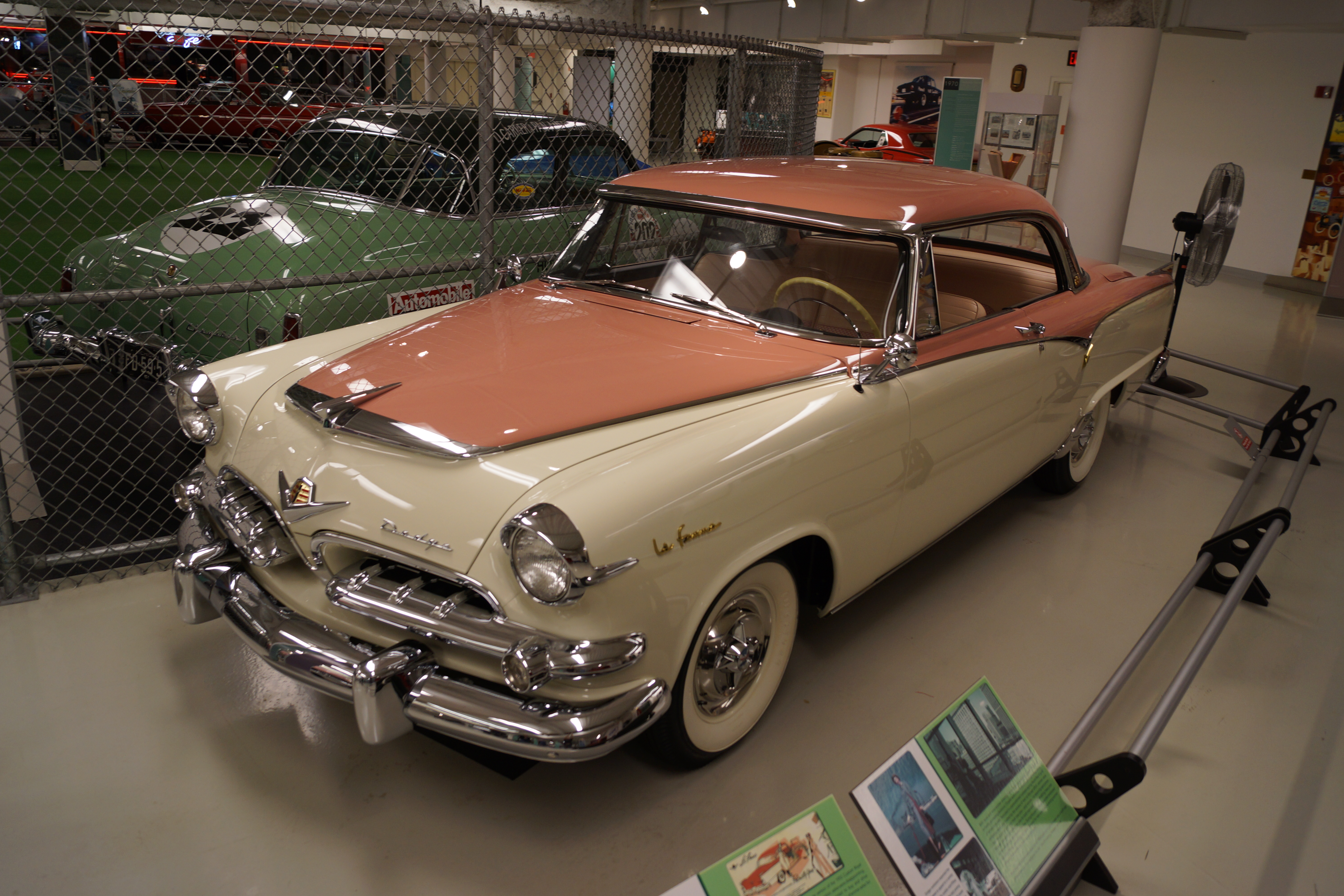
- 1955 Dodge La Femme

Overview
- Manufacturer: Dodge (Chrysler)
- Production: 1955–1956 (option on Dodge Custom Royal Lancer models)
- Assembly: United States: Hamtramck, Michigan (Dodge Main Factory)

Body and chassis
- Class: Full-size
- Body style: 2-door hardtop
- Layout: FR layout

Powertrain
- Engine: V8

Dimensions
- Wheelbase: 120 in (3,048 mm)
- Length: 212 in (5,385 mm)

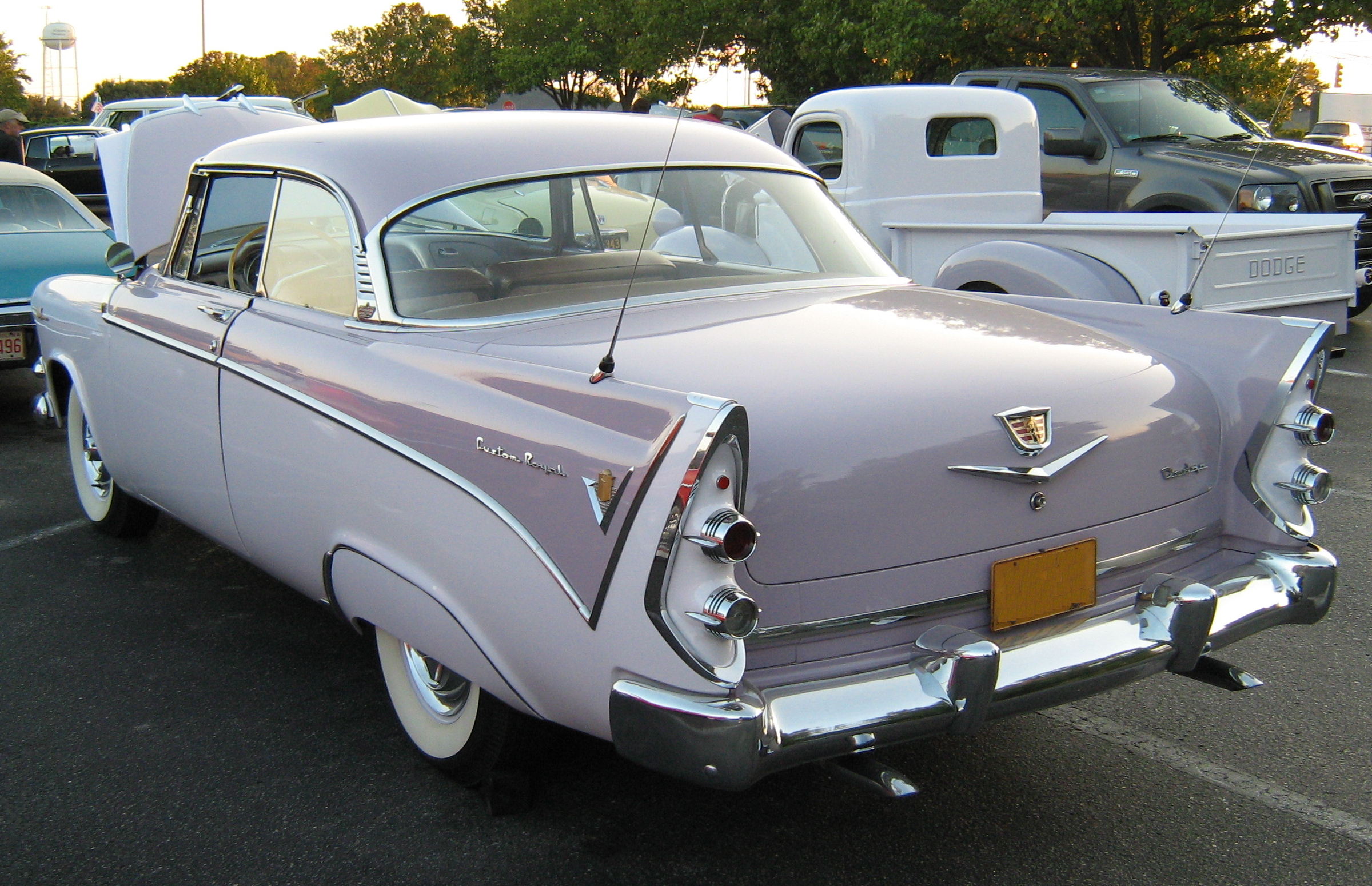
1956 Dodge La Femme

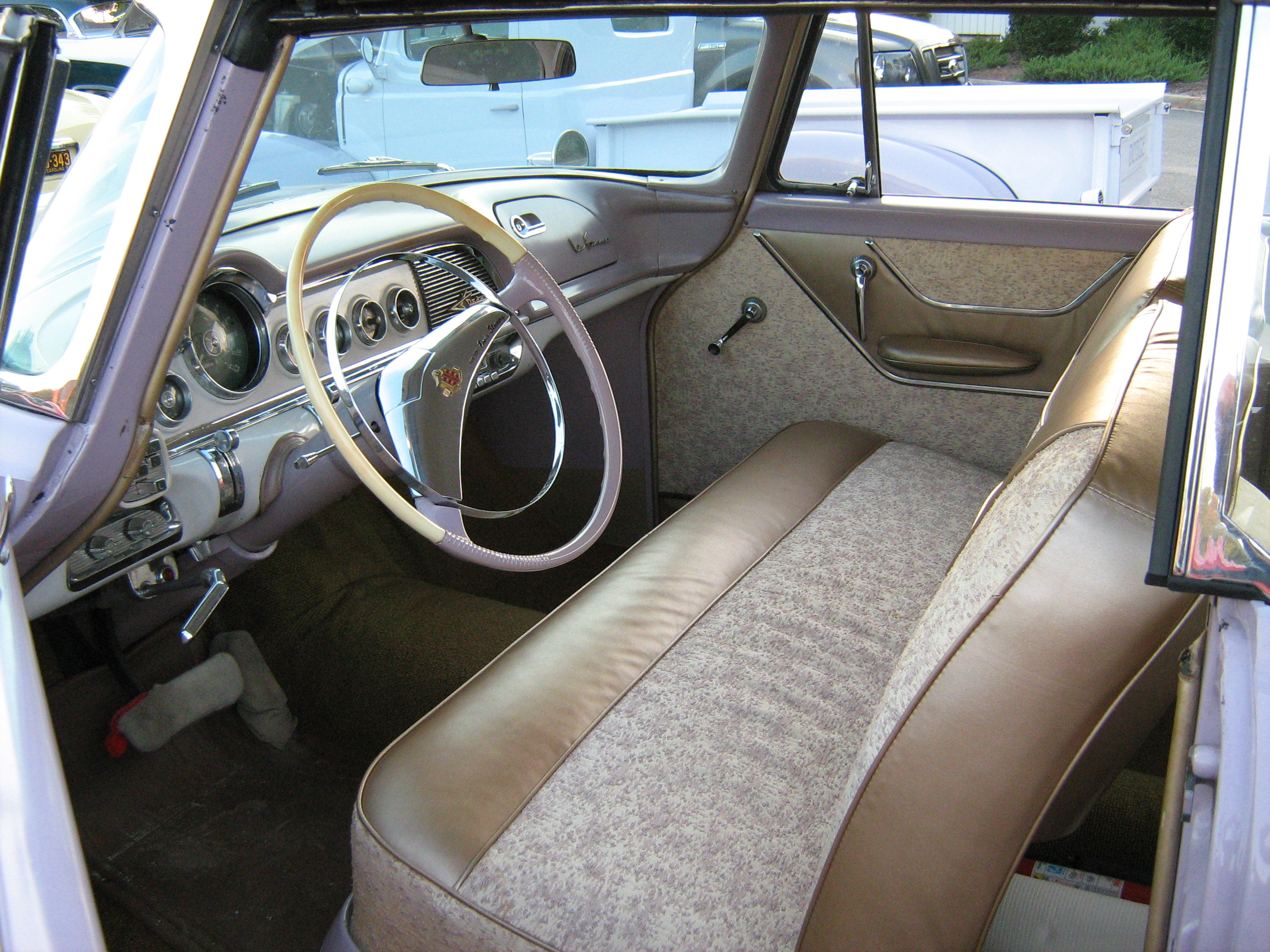
1956 La Femme interior

The Dodge La Femme is a full-sized automobile that was produced by Dodge between 1955 and 1956. The La Femme option was specifically designed for women, and was available on 1955 and 1956 Dodge Custom Royal Lancer models.

== Origin ==
The La Femme stemmed from the observation of Chrysler's marketing department that more women were taking an interest in automobiles during the 1950s, and that women's opinions on which color car to buy were becoming part of the decision-making process for couples buying an automobile. The La Femme was an attempt to gain a foothold in the women's automobile market.

The La Femme concept was based upon two Chrysler show cars from the 1954 season. Named Le Comte, and La Comtesse, each was built from a Chrysler Newport hardtop body and was given a clear plastic roof over the entire passenger compartment. While the Le Comte was designed using masculine colors, the La Comtesse was painted "Dusty Rose" and "Pigeon Grey" in order to convey femininity. Favorable responses encouraged Chrysler to pursue the La Comtesse concept.

== 1955 ==
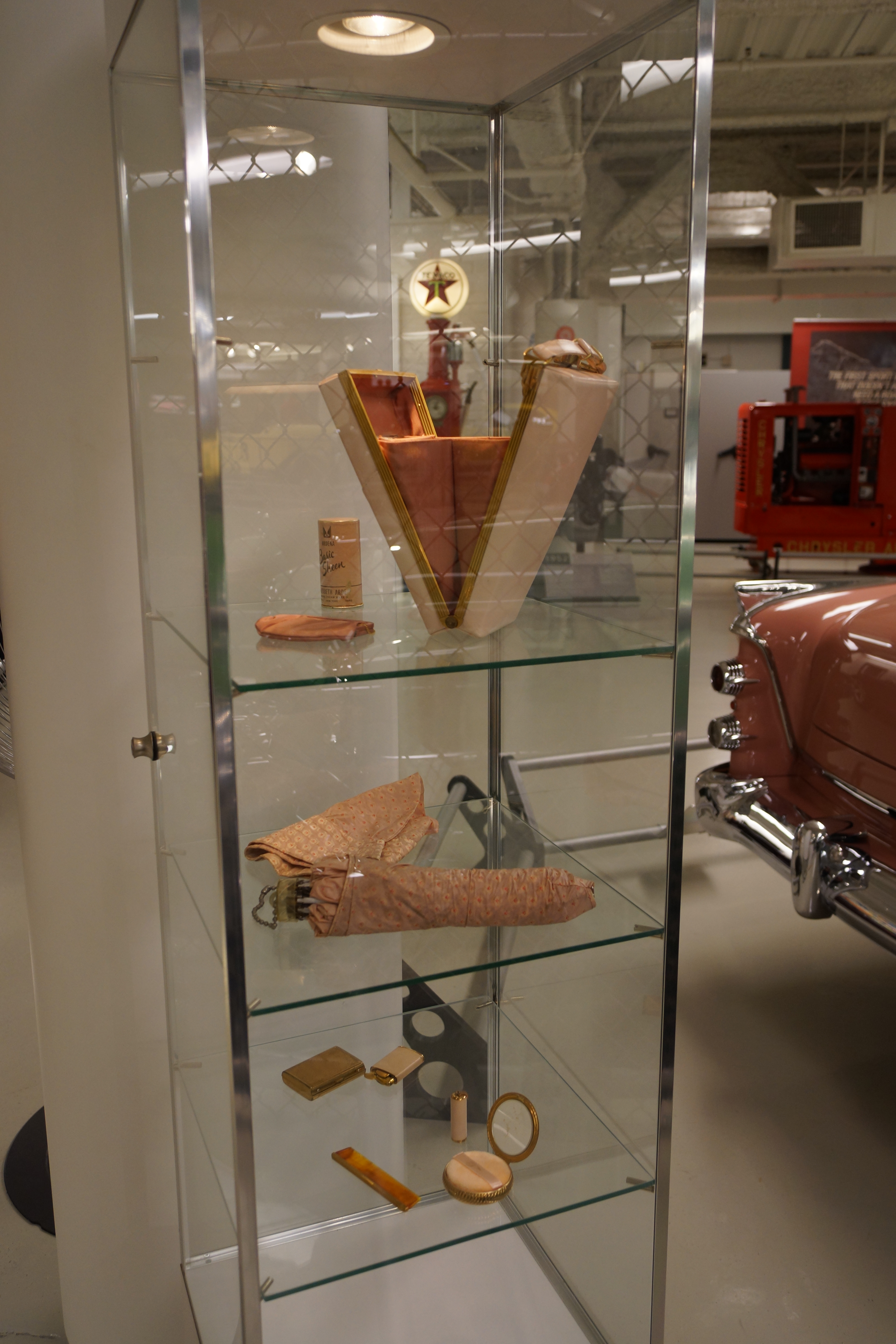
1955 Dodge La Femme Accessories, not including the pink cylinder immediately to the left of the purse. It was erroneously included in the collection. The only accessory not shown is the rain coat.

Dodge received the project and renamed the concept the La Femme, which began as a 1955 Dodge Custom Royal Lancer "spring special" hardtop two-door coupe, painted "Sapphire White" and "Heather Rose". From there, the exterior received special gold-colored "La Femme" scripts that replaced the standard "Custom Royal Lancer" scripts on the cars front fenders.

The interior of the car also received attention and features. 1955 La Femme interiors were upholstered in a special tapestry material featuring pink rosebuds on a pale silver-pink background and pale pink vinyl trim. The La Femme came with a keystone-shaped, pink calfskin purse that coordinated with the interior of the car. The purse could be stowed in a compartment in the back of the passenger seat, and its gold-plated medallion faced outward. This brushed-metal medallion was large enough to have the owner's name engraved on it.

Each purse was outfitted with a coordinated set of accessories inside, which included a face-powder compact, lipstick case, cigarette case, comb, cigarette lighter, and change purse, all made of either faux-tortoiseshell plastic and gold-tone metal, or pink calfskin and gold-tone metal, and all were designed and made by Evans Case Company of North Attleboro, MA, a maker of men and women's fine keepsakes and jewelry.

On the back of the driver's seat was a compartment that contained a raincoat, rain bonnet, and umbrella, all made from a vinyl patterned to match the rosebud interior fabric. Marketing brochures stated that the car was made "By Special Appointment to Her Majesty... the American Woman."

== 1956 ==
In 1956, the La Femme returned, with letters from Dodge's marketing department to dealerships calling the La Femme a "stunning success". For 1956, Dodge replaced the Heather Rose and Sapphire White scheme with a Misty Orchid and Regal Orchid color scheme. The interior of the car in 1956 did not take its cue from the 1955 model, and instead featured "La Femme"-only seat patterns, headliner, interior paint, and carpet. The fabrics used have proven difficult to reproduce. The seat coverings were made of a heavy white cloth with random, organic-seeming patterns of short lavender and purple loops, in a manner similar to loop-pile carpeting. The headliner cloth was heavy white fabric, with many tiny random splashes of gold paint. The carpeting was loop pile with several shades of lavender and purple. The boxes behind the seats were changed for 1956 to accommodate the rain coat, rain cap and umbrella provided with the model. Both boxes were identical this year, because there was no need to accommodate a purse, which was only offered with the 1955 La Femme.

== Legacy ==
Dodge dropped the La Femme for 1957 and did not revisit the concept. Because the La Femme was an option package ($143), its total production was never broken out from Dodge's production numbers, although research suggests fewer than 2,500 were made over the two-year period. At least 40 known examples exist of the 1955 version and over 20 for the 1956 version, including at least 3 verifiable Dodge D-500 engine optioned 1956 La Femme.

Many theories exist concerning the low sales of the La Femme trim package. Given the large number of Dodge dealerships in the U.S. at the time, few of them received a demonstration La Femme for their showroom. Entitled “By Special Appointment to Her Majesty... the American Woman" dealer three-fold single-sheet pamphlets promoted the car as "in mood and manner" for a "discriminating, modern woman." Other trim-special models such as the Chrysler 300 letter series, Plymouth Fury, and DeSoto Adventurer were widely promoted.

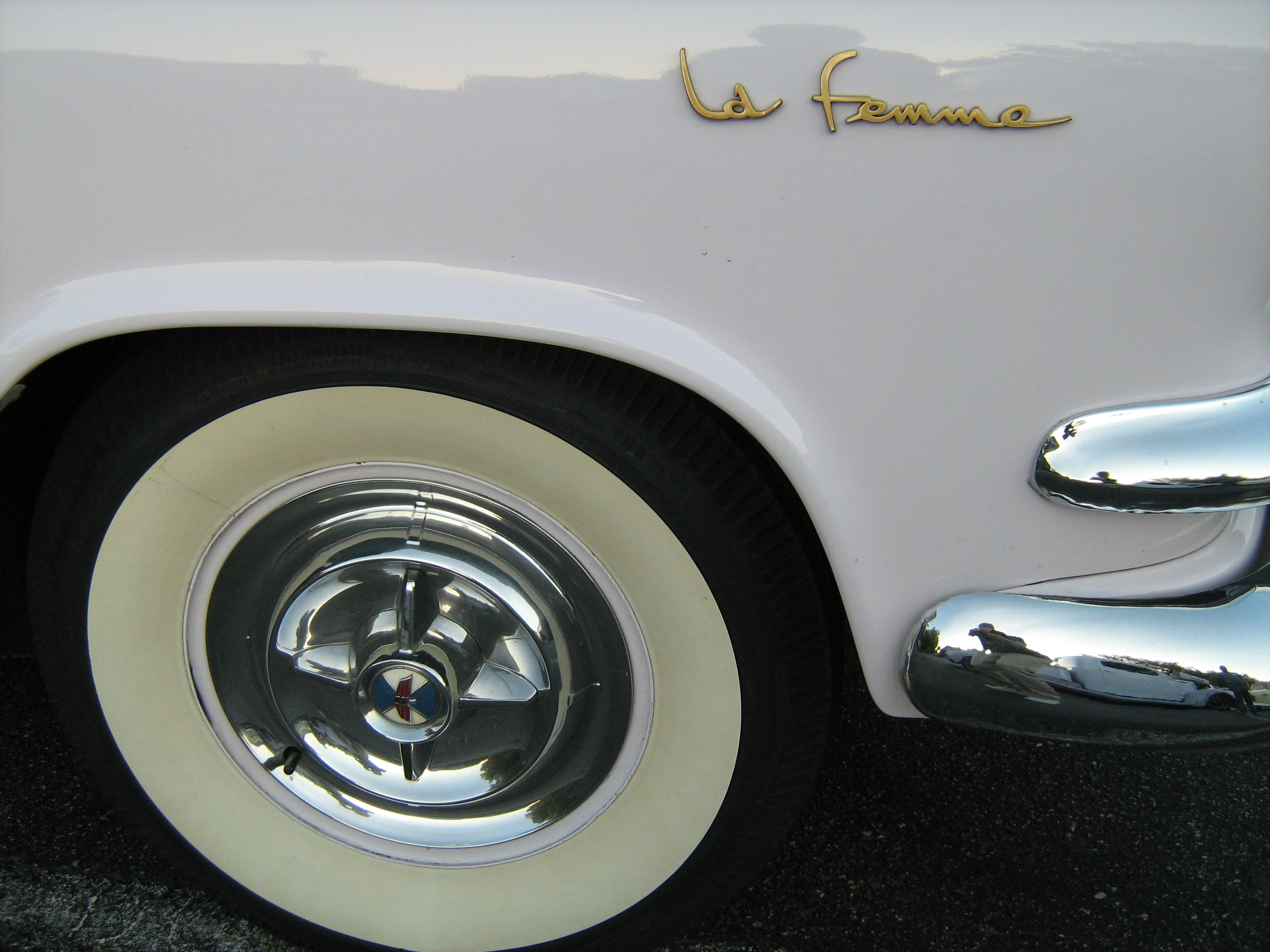
Gold-colored "La Femme" fender script

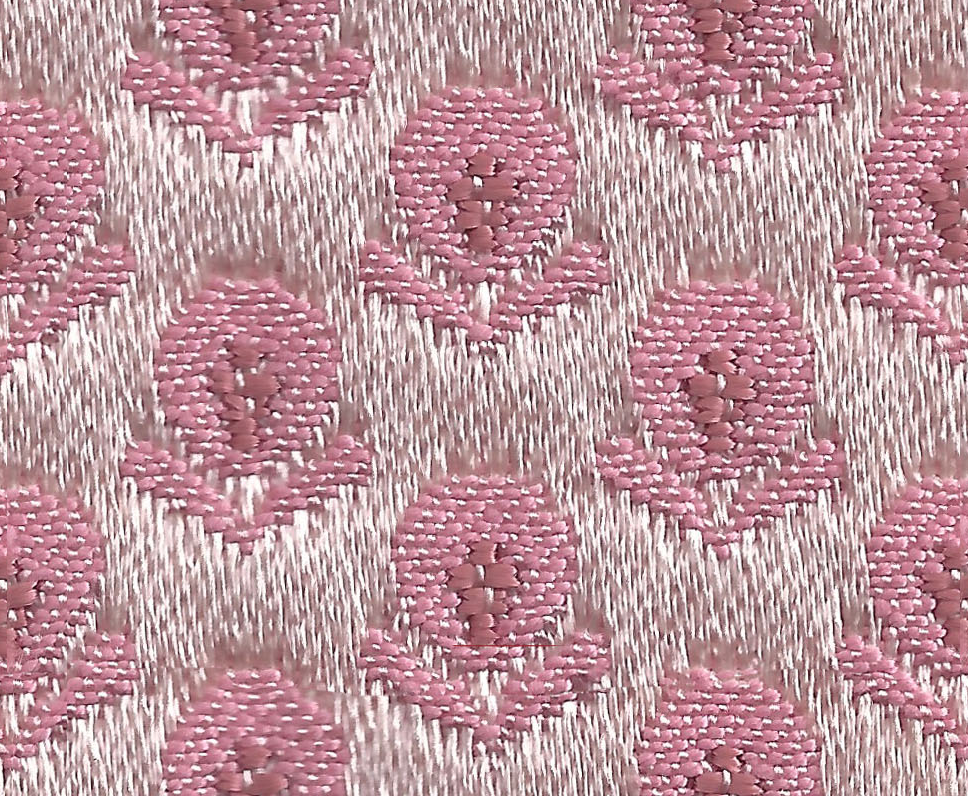
1955 La Femme Rosebud Upholstery Close-Up View

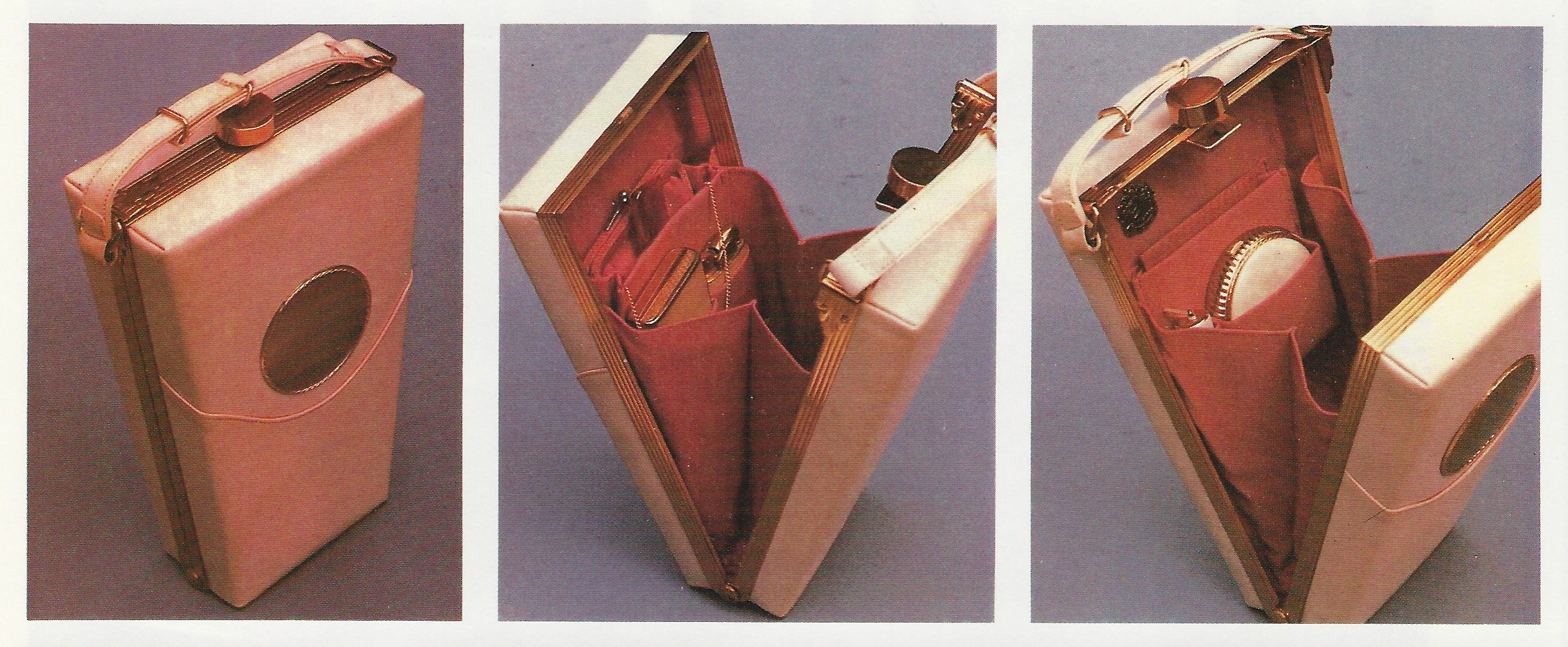
1955 La Femme Purse

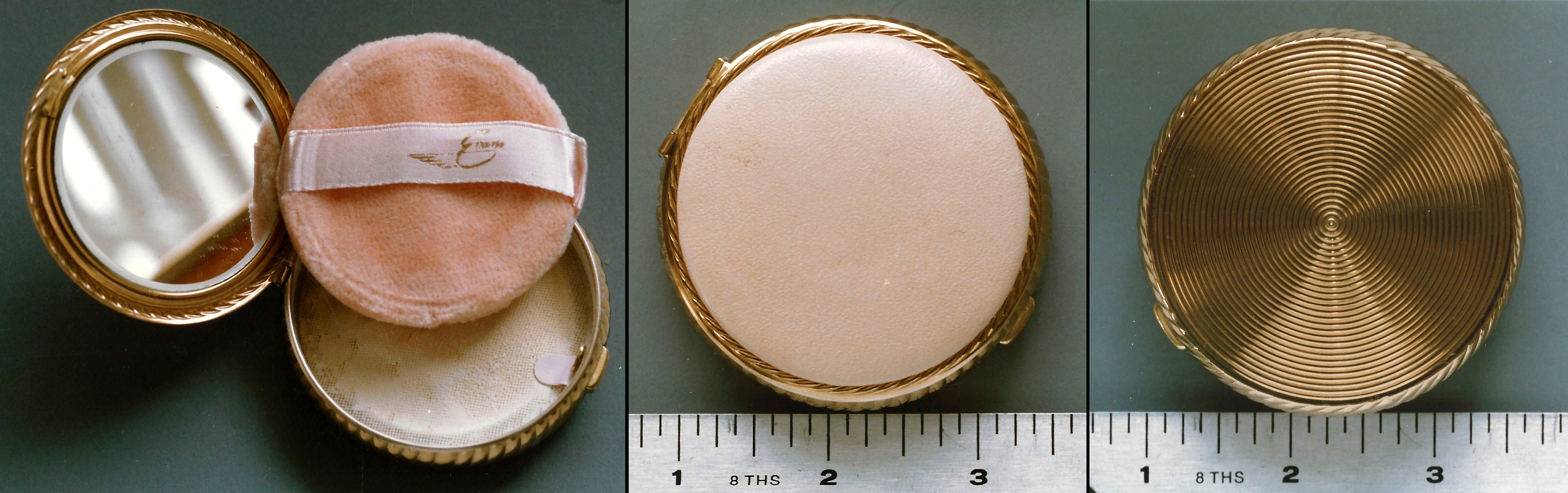
1955 Dodge La Femme Makeup Compact. Note the "Evans" logo.

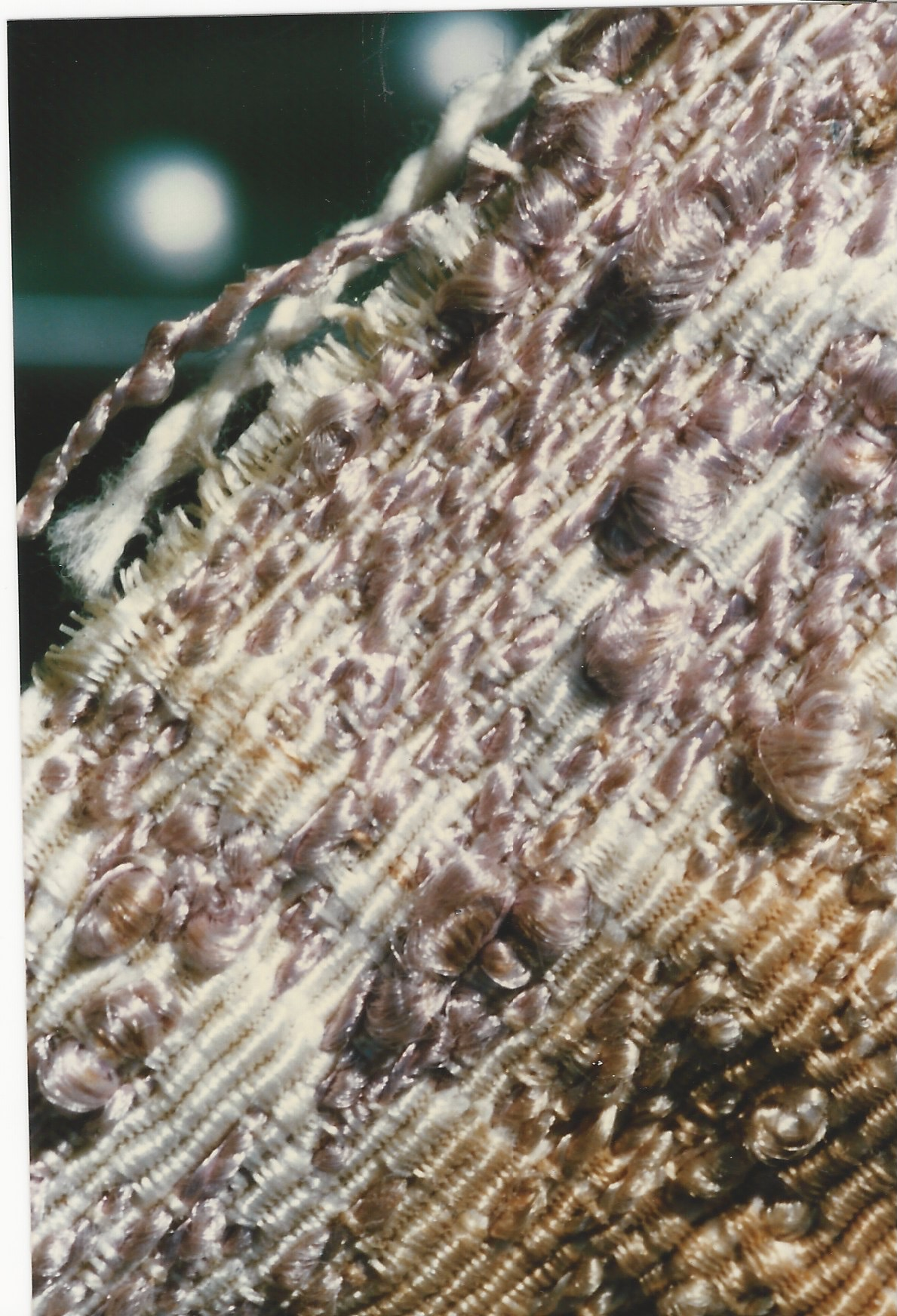
1956 La Femme upholstery fabric, close-up view. Lower, darker portion shows damage from age and the elements.

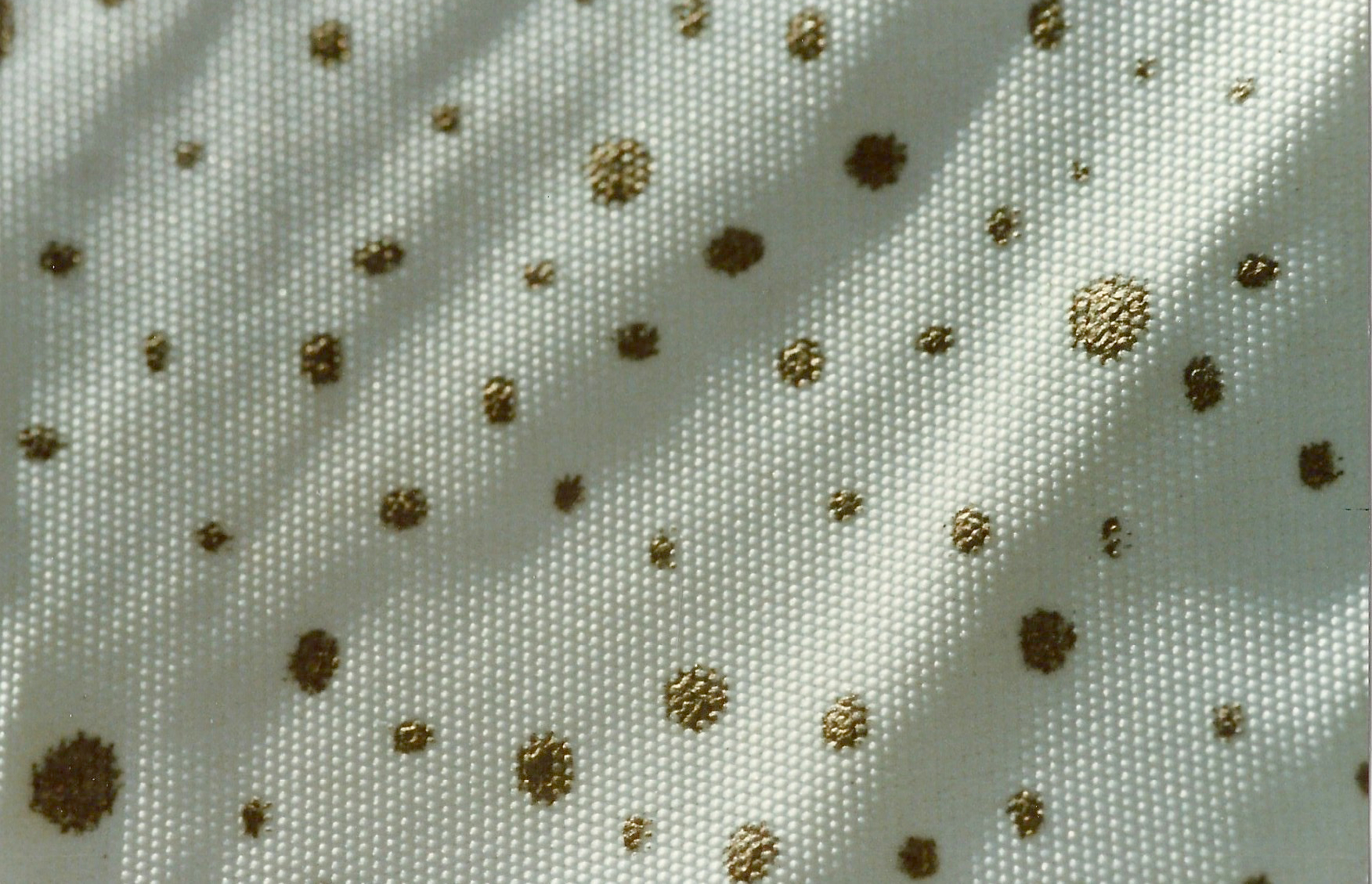
This white-background, gold-paint-flecked pattern was used on the 1956 La Femme's headliner, rain hat, rain coat and umbrella. It was also used to line the insides of the two front setback containers, meant to hold the aforementioned accessories.

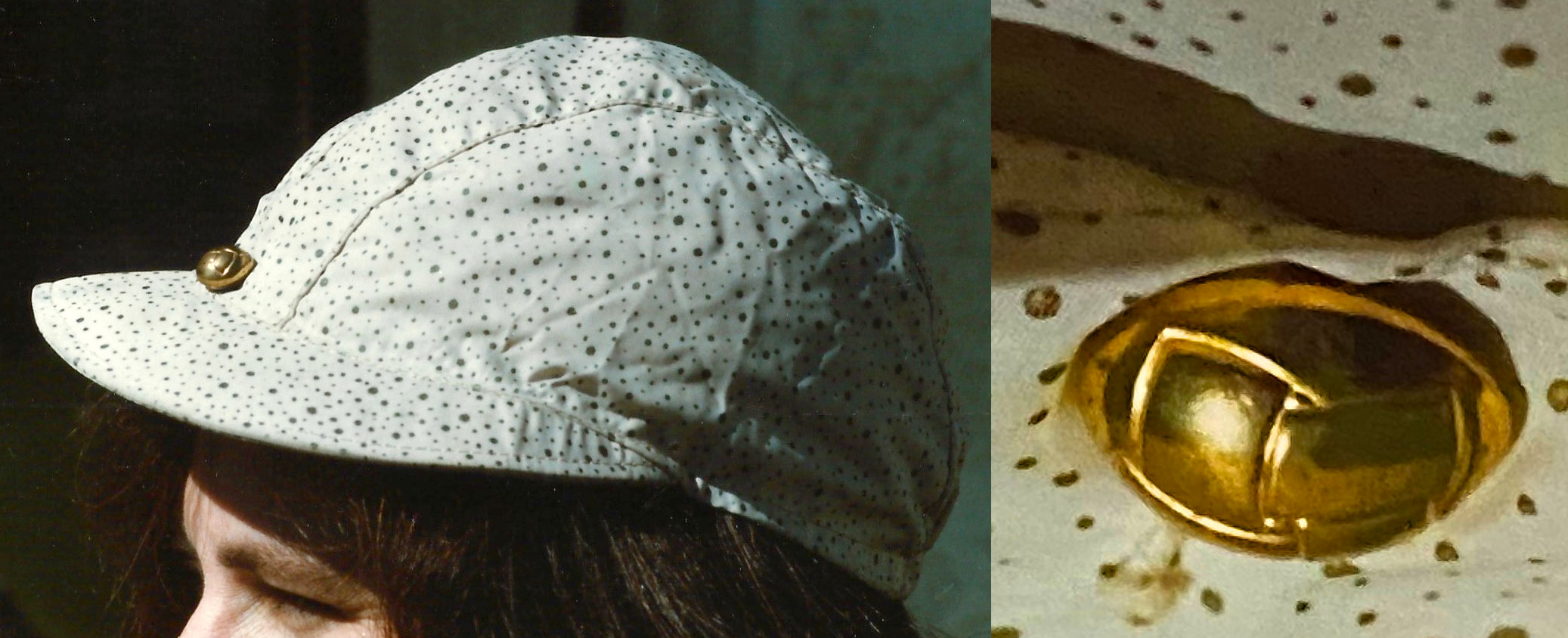
This rain cap was included with every 1956 La Femme, along with a rain coat and umbrella constructed using the same fabric.

== Sources ==
- Guyette, James (January 2004). "LaFemme: a fancy and feminine statement of the chauvinist '50s". Aftermarket Business.
- Lindsey, Tony (February 1988). "1955-56 Dodge La Femme: "By Appointment to Her Majesty – the American Woman"". Collectible Automobile.
