= Dodge Custom Royal =

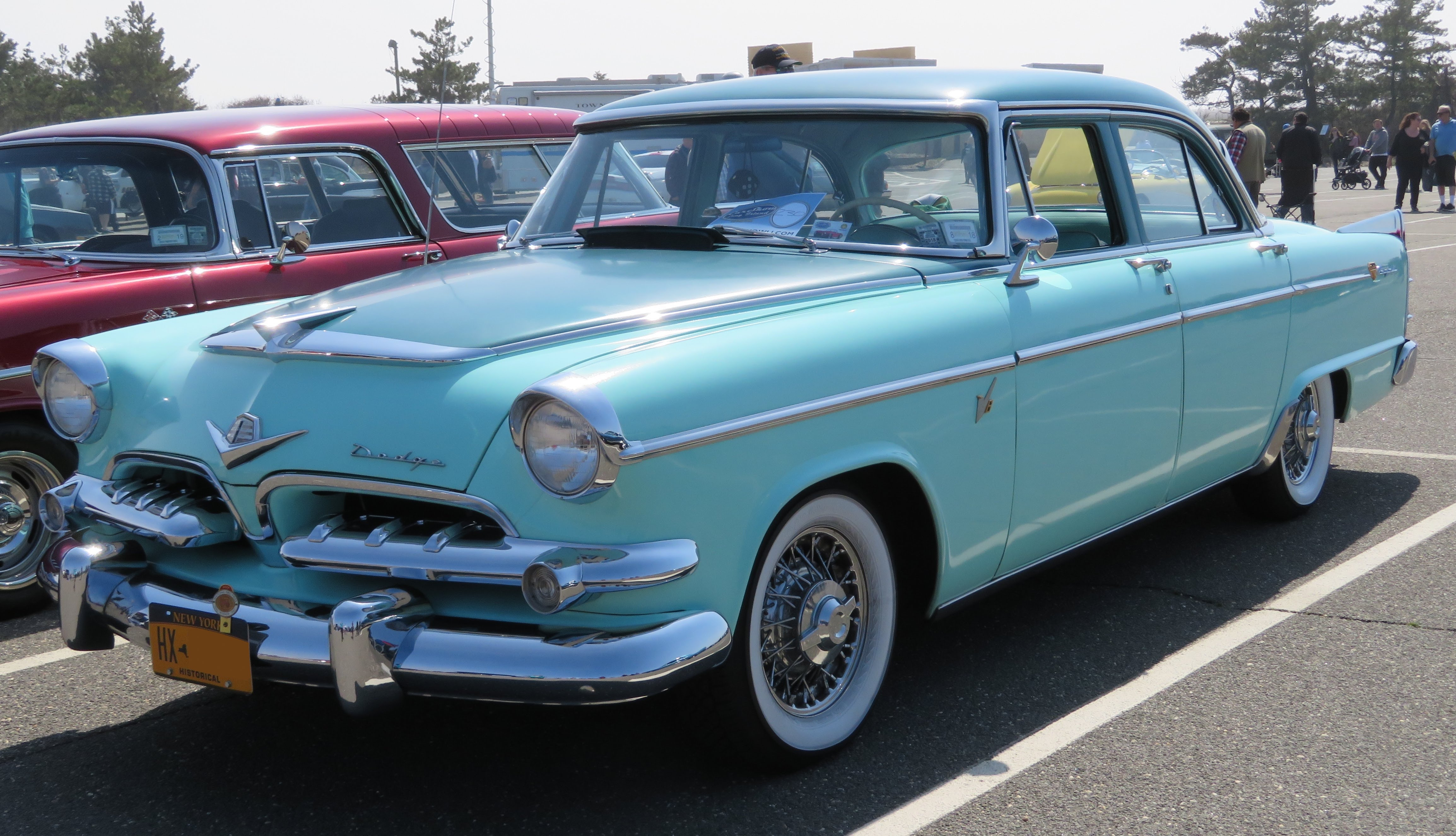
- 1955 Dodge Custom Royal 4-Door Sedan

Overview
- Manufacturer: Dodge (Chrysler)
- Also called: Custom Royal Lancer
- Production: 1955–1959
- Assembly: United States: Hamtramck, Michigan (Dodge Main Factory); Australia: Mile End (Chrysler Australia)

Body and chassis
- Class: Full-size
- Body style: 4-door sedan 2-door hardtop 4-door hardtop 2-door convertible
- Layout: FR layout

Powertrain
- Engine: Canadian by Year; 1956: 303 CID Plymouth A Block (Badges on valve covers show "Super Red Ram"); 1957: 313 Plymouth A Block; American by Year; 1955: 270 CID; 1956: 315 CID "Polyspheric" (Badges on valve covers show "Super Red Ram"); 1956: Optional D-500 315 CID; 1957: 325 CID "Polyspheric"; 1957: Optional D-500 325 CID

Chronology
- Successor: Dodge Polara

The Dodge Custom Royal is an automobile which was produced by Dodge in the United States for the 1955 through 1959 model years. In each of these years the Custom Royal was the top trim level of the Dodge line, above the mid level Dodge Royal and the base level Dodge Coronet. 2-Door Hardtop, 4-Door Hardtop and Convertible models were marketed under the name "Dodge Custom Royal Lancer".

A La Femme option was available on 1955 and 1956 Dodge Custom Royal Lancer models.

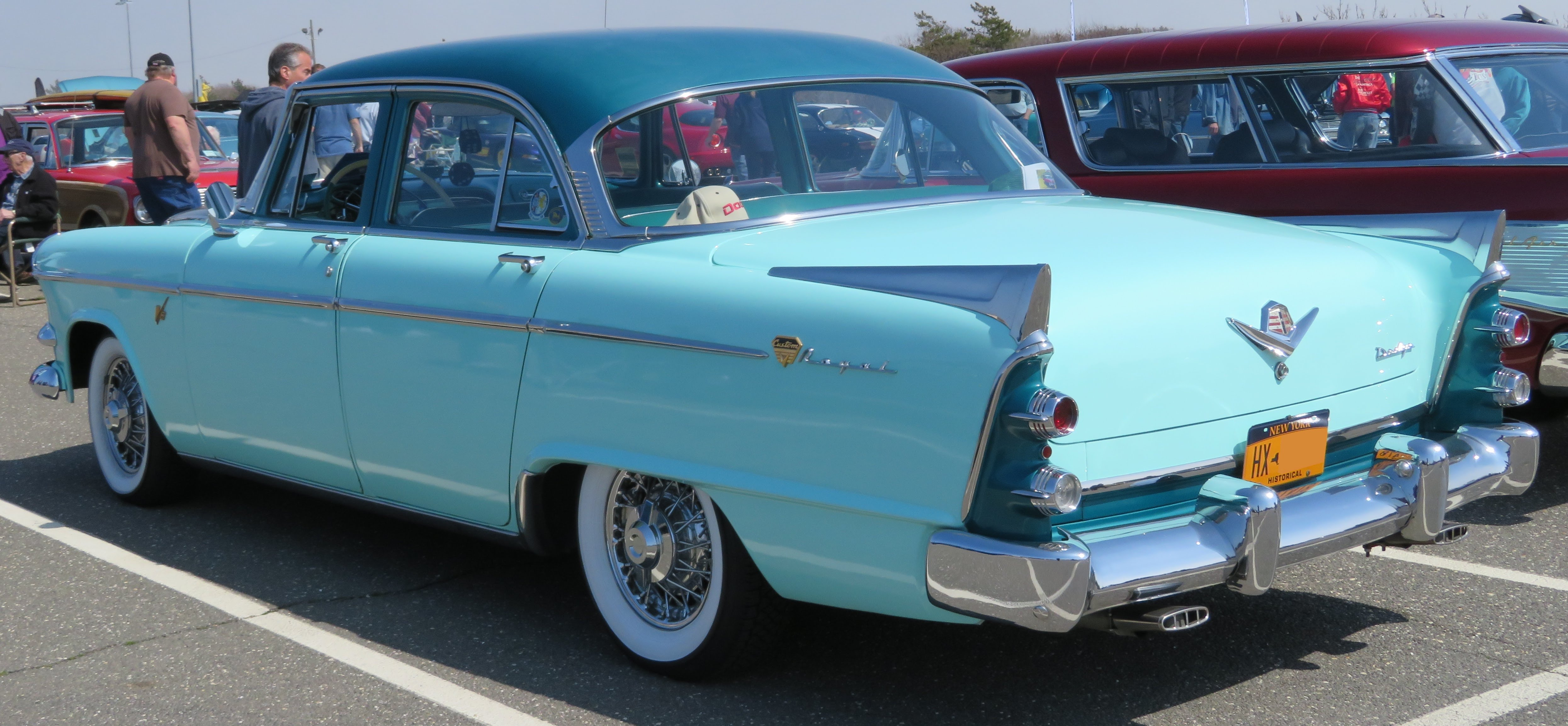
1955 Dodge Custom Royal 4-Door Sedan

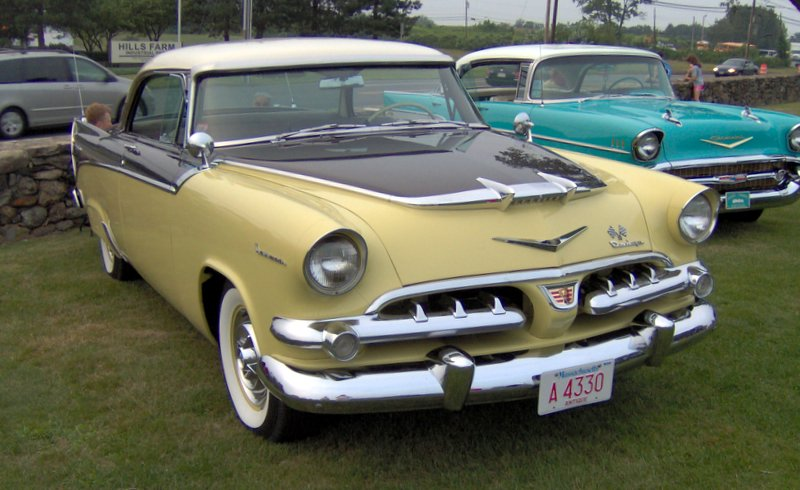
1956 Dodge Custom Royal Lancer

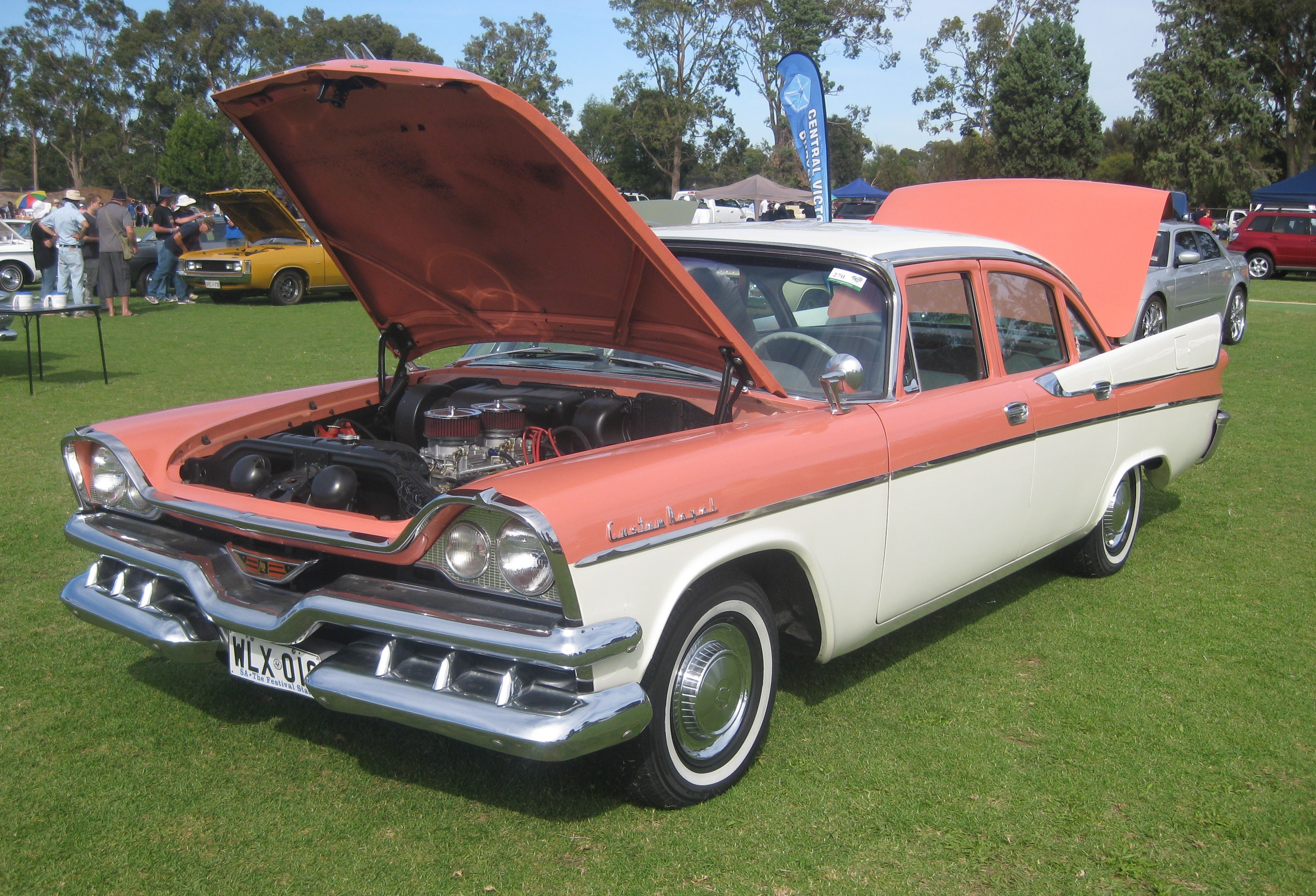
1957 Dodge Custom Royal 4-Door Sedan

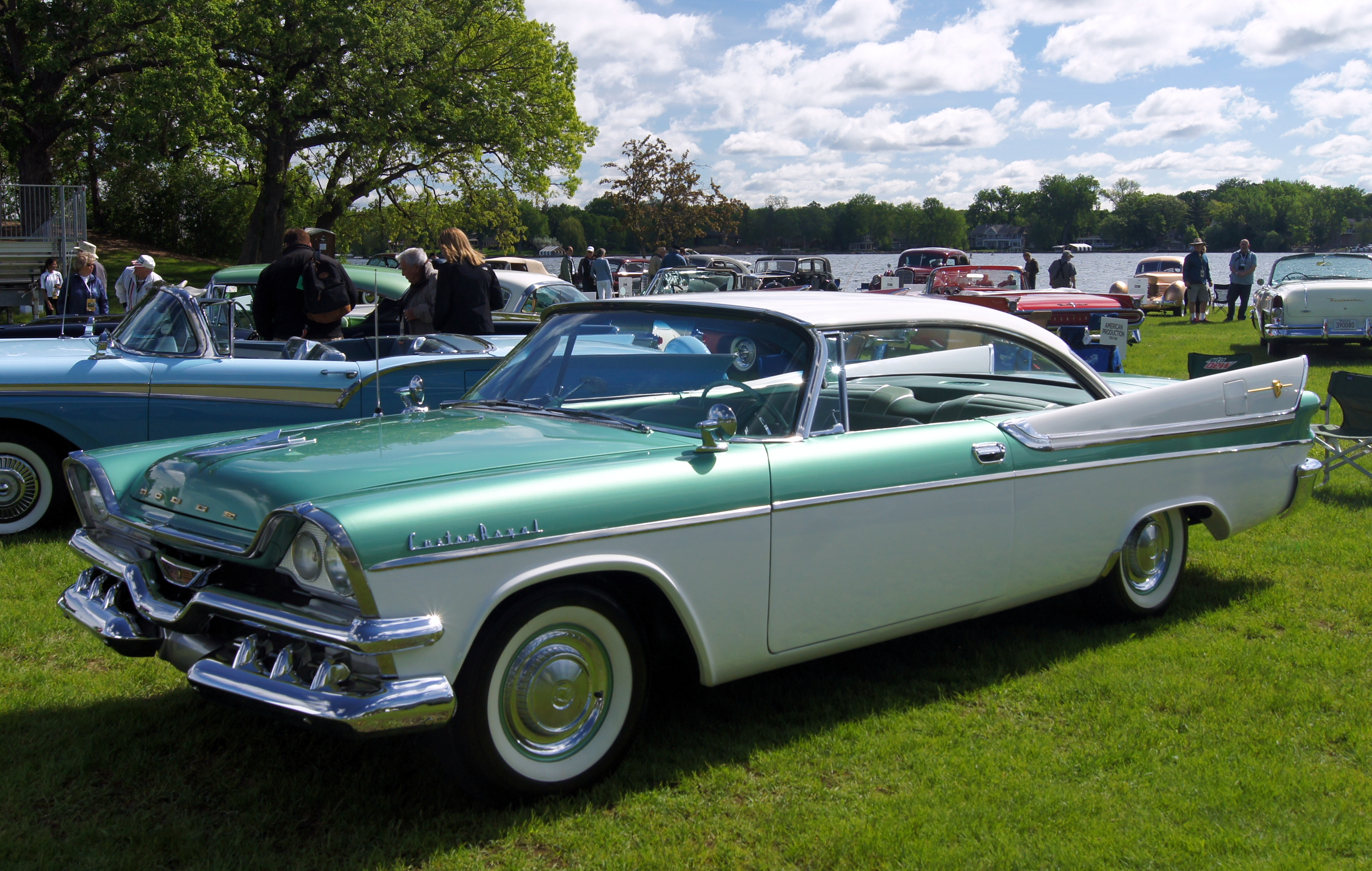
1957 Dodge Custom Royal Lancer 2-Door

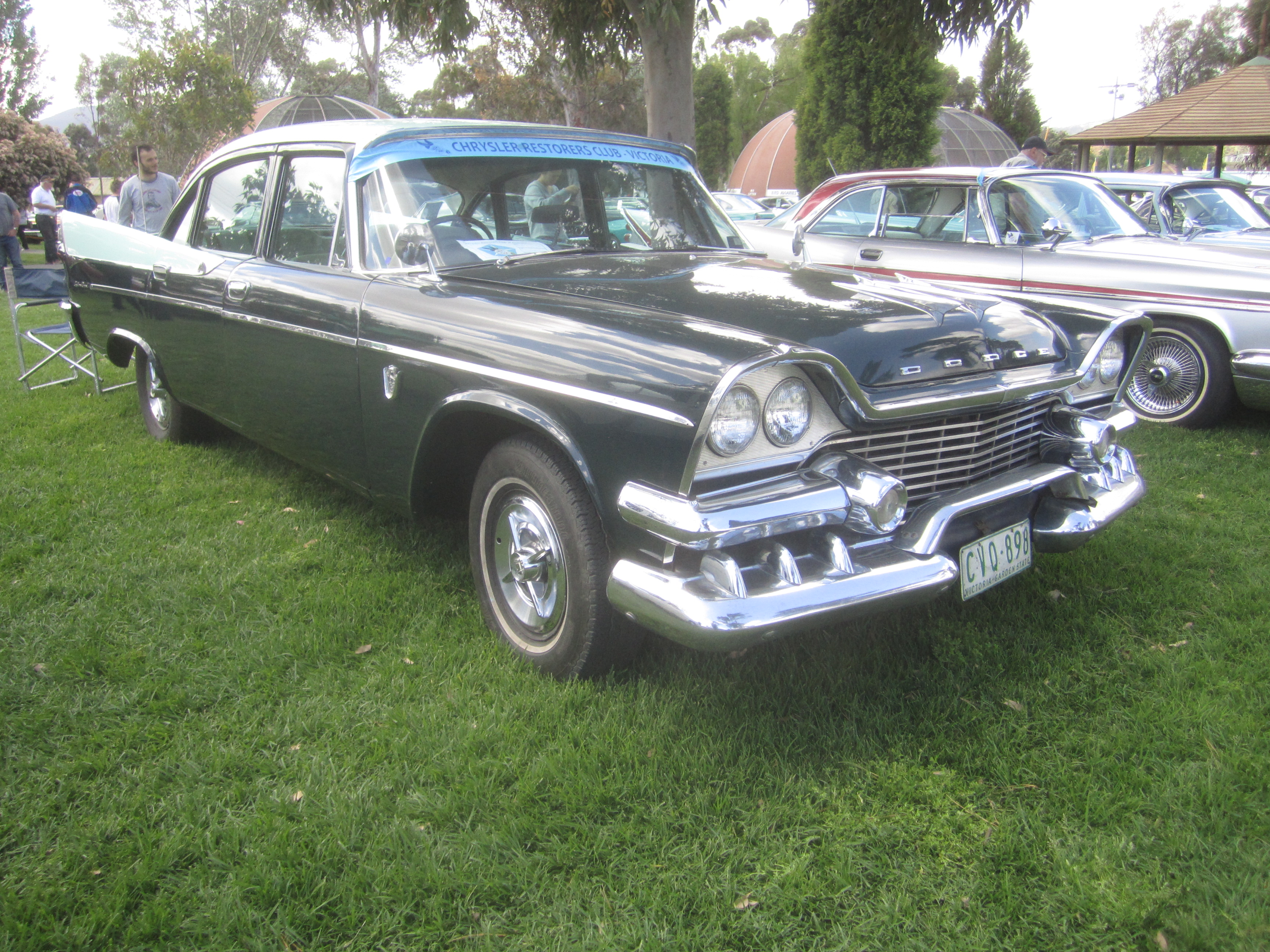
1958 Dodge Custom Royal 4-Door Sedan

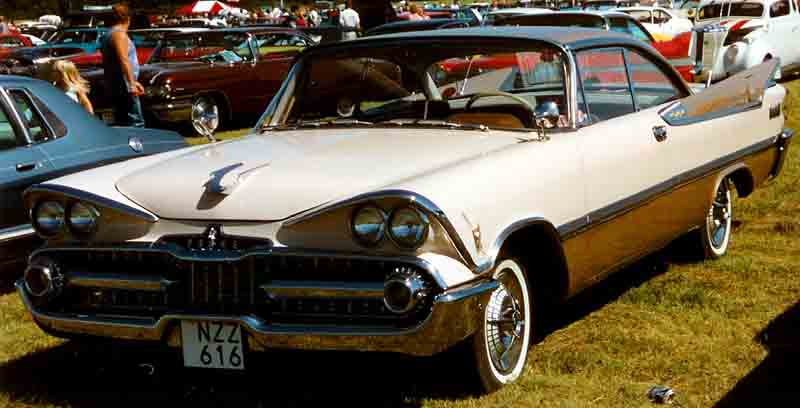
1959 Dodge Custom Royal Lancer 2-Door

== Australian production ==
The Custom Royal was assembled by Chrysler Australia at its Mile End plant in South Australia from early 1958 utilizing CKD kits imported from Detroit. It was offered only as a four-door sedan.

== See also ==
- 1955 Dodge
- 1958 Dodge
