= Dodge Royal =

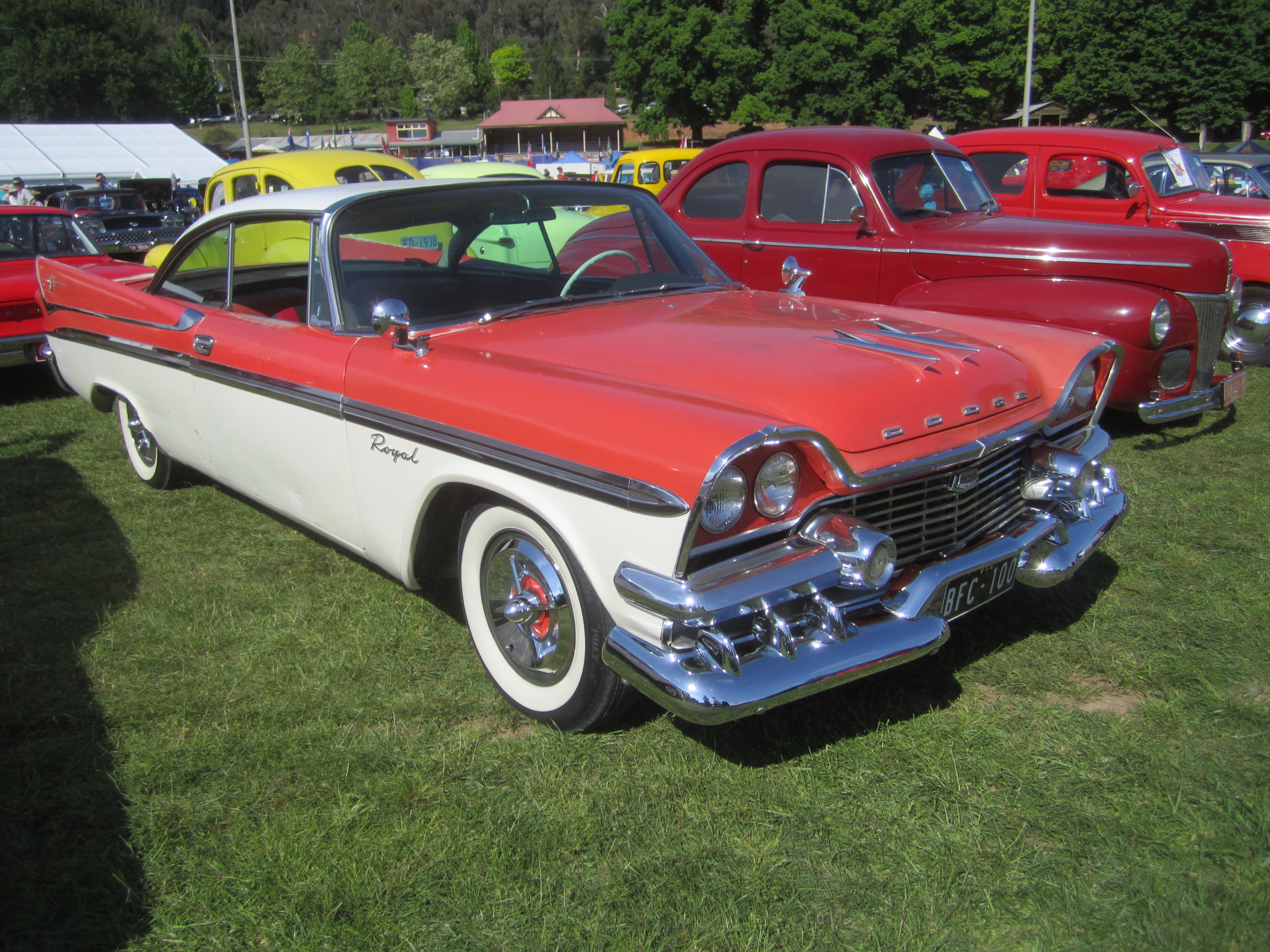
- 1958 Dodge Royal Lancer 2-Door

Overview
- Manufacturer: Dodge
- Production: 1954–1959
- Model years: 1954–1959

Body and chassis
- Class: Full-size
- Body style: 4-door sedan 2-door coupe 2-door hardtop 4-door hardtop 2-door convertible 2-door station wagon 4-door station wagon
- Layout: FR layout

Chronology
- Successor: Dodge Matador

The Dodge Royal is an automobile produced by Dodge in the United States from the 1954 through 1959 model years.

== First generation (1954) ==
The Royal was introduced for the 1954 model year as the top trim level of the Dodge line, above the mid level Dodge Coronet and the base level Dodge Meadowbrook. It was offered only with a 241 cubic inch 'Hemi' V8 engine. The 1954 Royal V-8 range comprised 4-Door Sedan, Convertible, Club Coupe and Sport Coupe, the latter being a 2-door hardtop.

In 1954, Dodge President William Newberg drove a yellow, Hemi-powered Dodge convertible as the pace car for the Indy 500, the first Dodge to ever do so. To commemorate the event, Dodge offered a mid-year package called the Royal 500, a special trim package to add to the Royal convertible. This package included chrome wire wheels, special badging and a continental spare wheel kit on the rear. Officially, Dodge built 701 of these pace car replicas.

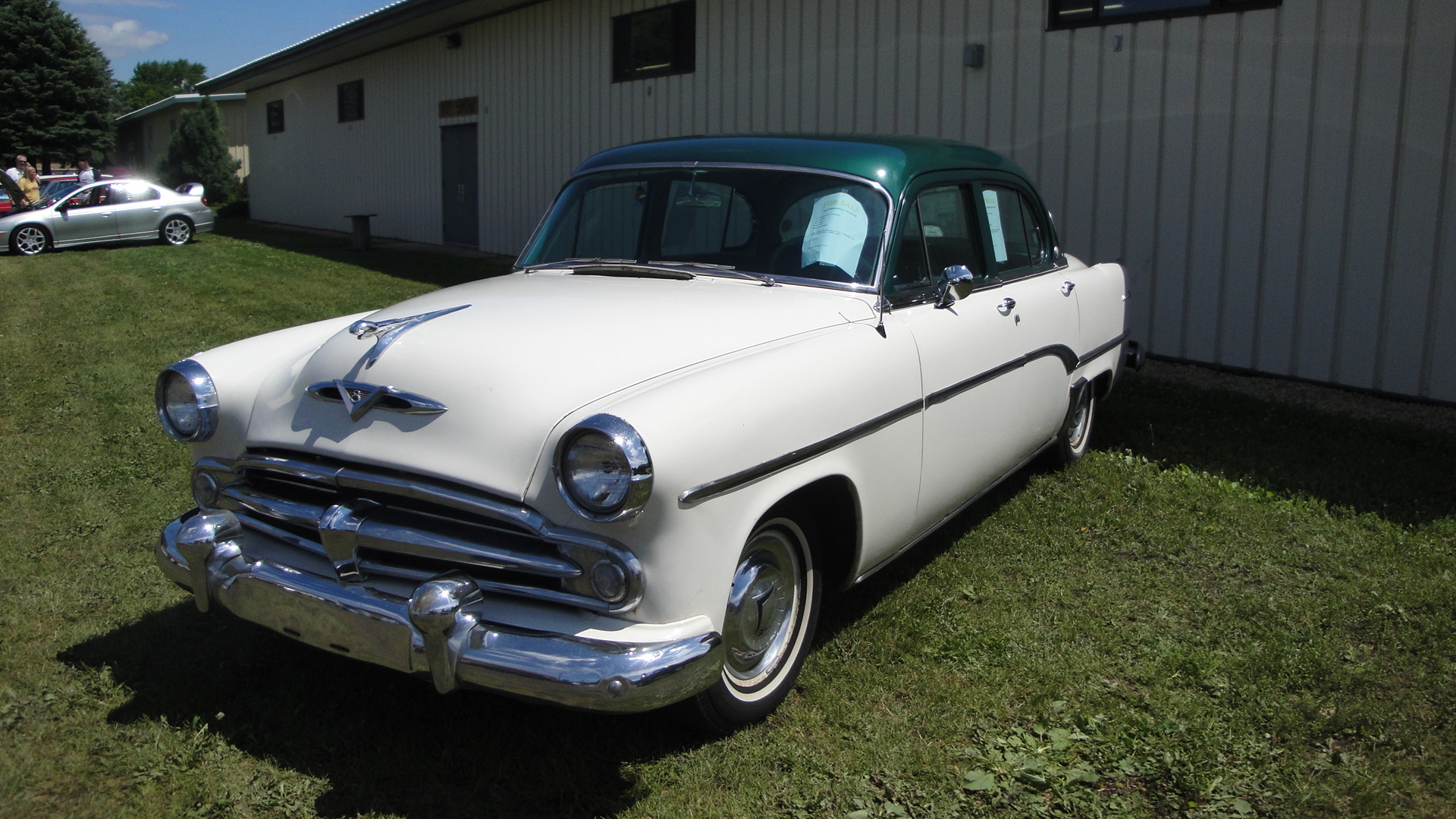
1954 Dodge Royal V-8 4-Door Sedan

== Second generation (1955–1956) ==
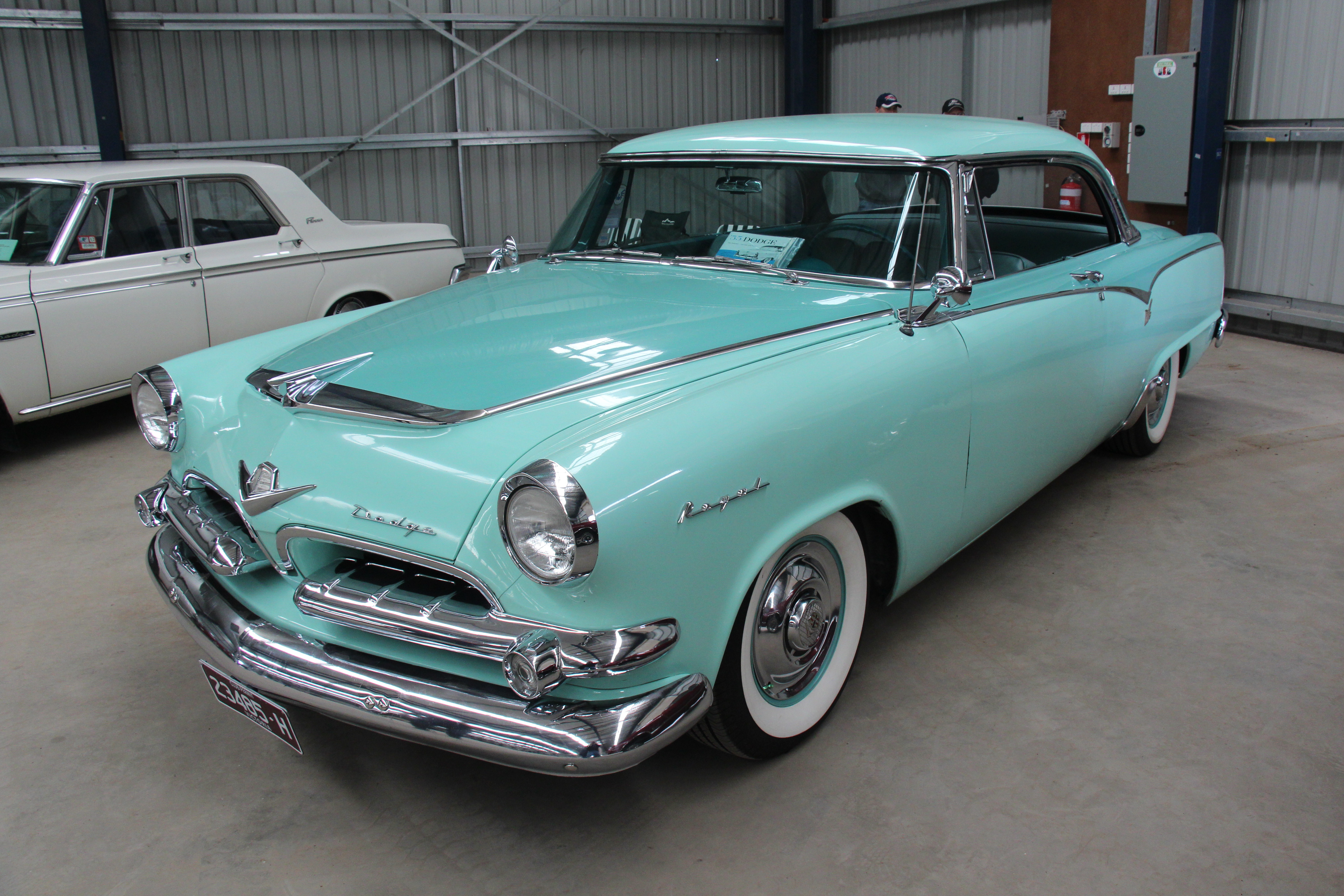
1955 Dodge Royal Lancer V-8

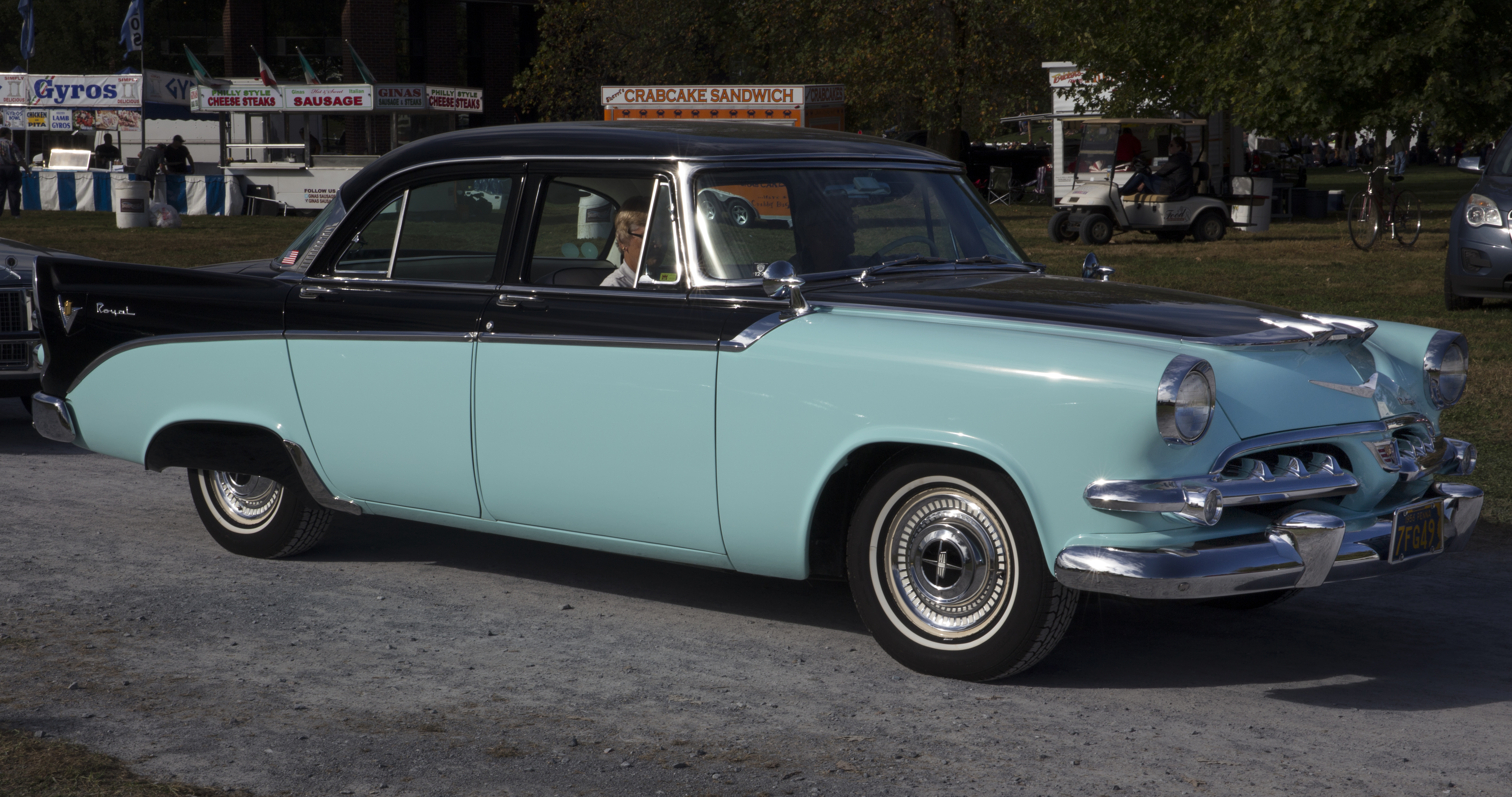
The 1956 Dodge Royal only saw detail changes

The introduction of the Dodge Custom Royal for the 1955 model year saw the Royal moved down to the intermediate trim level, above the now base-model Coronet. The Royal Lancer name was applied to the 2-door hardtop model and Royal Sierra to the new station wagon models.

For 1956 the use of the Royal Lancer name was extended to include a new 4-door hardtop model. Station wagons now included 2-door Royal Custom Suburban and 4-door Royal Custom Sierra models. External changes were mainly the growth of tailfins, redesigned taillight housings and side trim treatments. Changes at the front were limited to the addition of six "fins" in the grille (not to be found on the lower-grade Coronet) and an altered hood ornament.

== Third generation (1957–1959) ==
The Royal continued as the intermediate trim level in the Dodge line for models years 1957 through 1959. A Royal Lancer Convertible was added for 1957 only and the station wagons were moved to their own series in the same year.

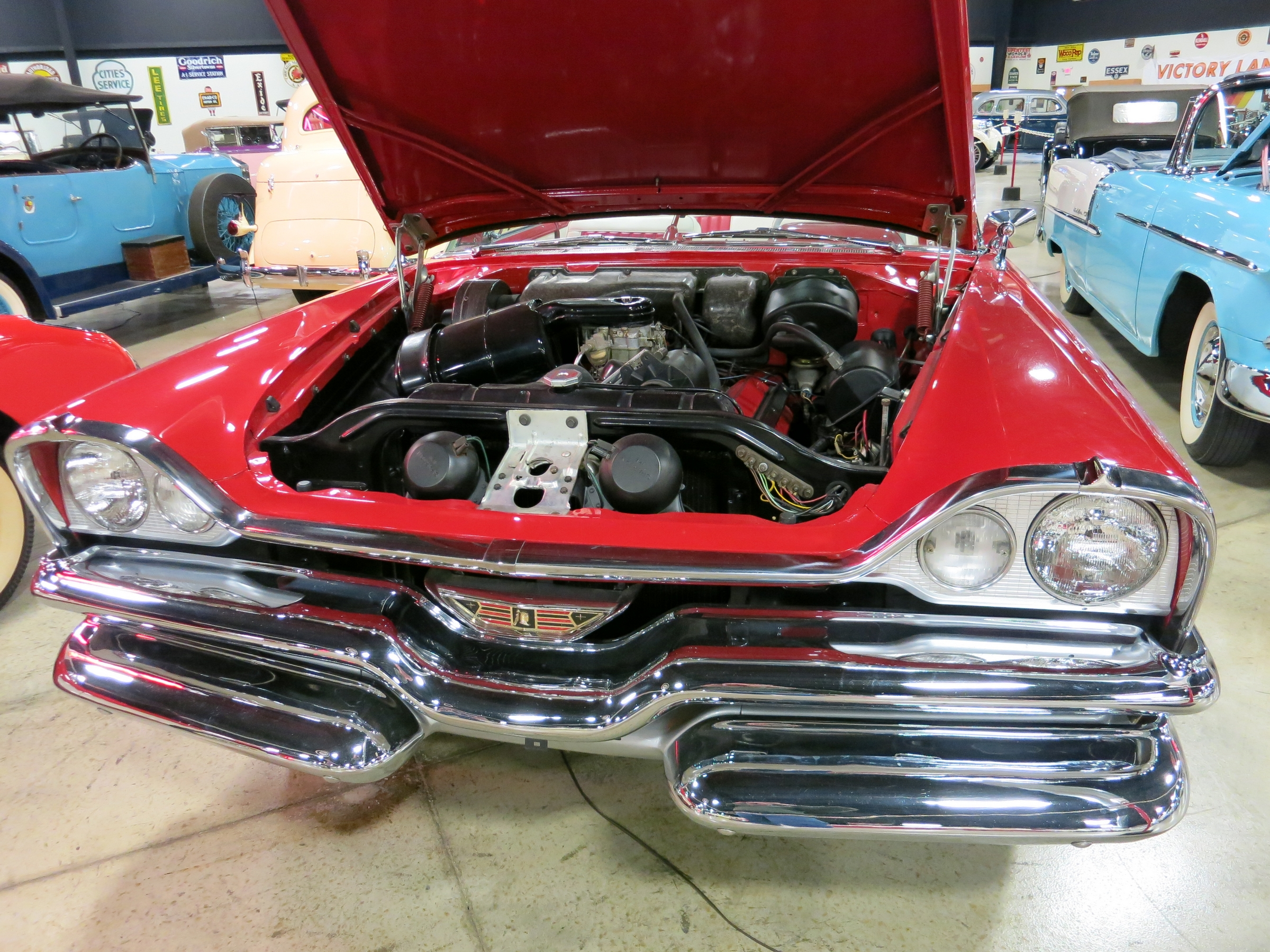
1957 Dodge Royal

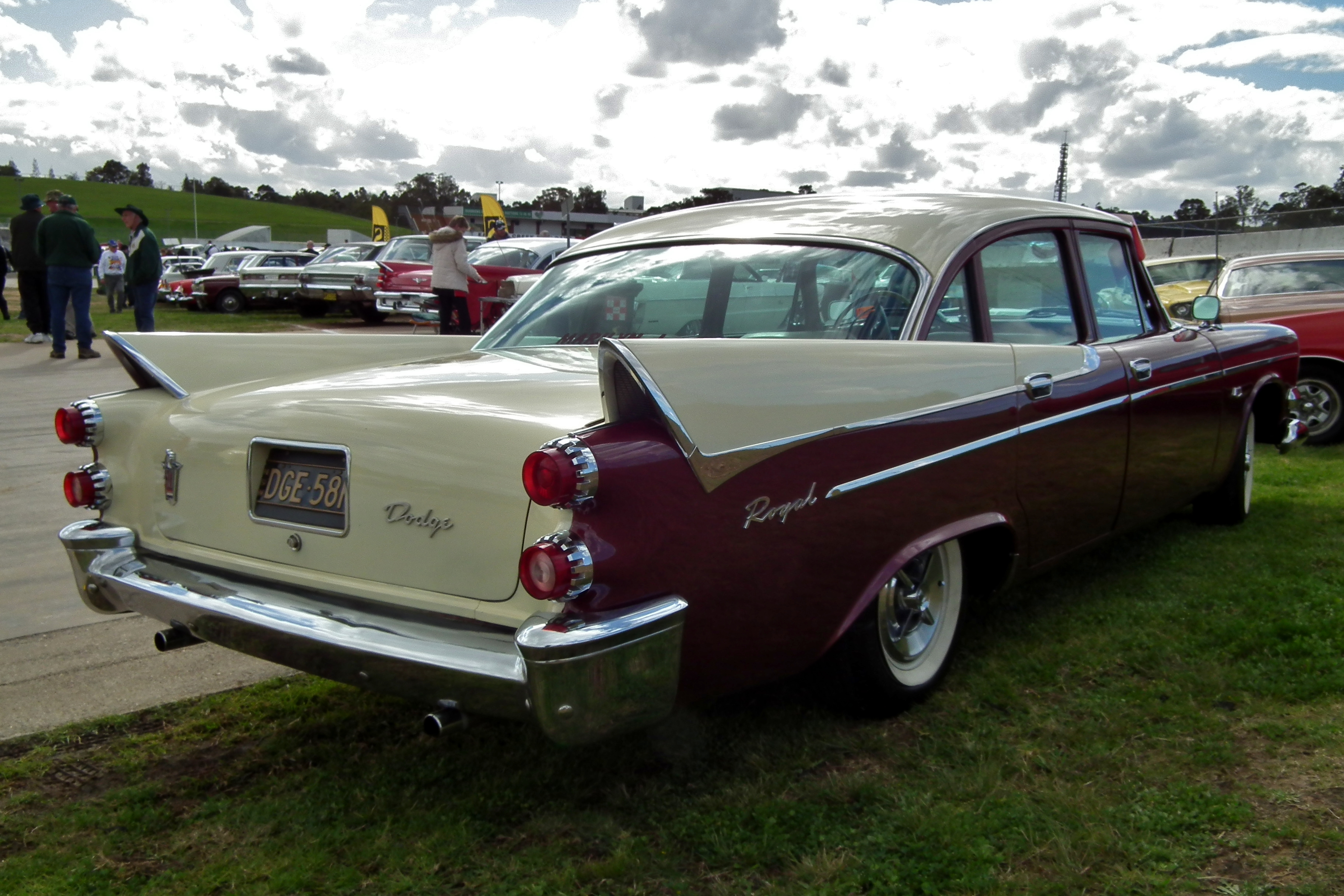
1958 Dodge Royal 4-Door Sedan

== Discontinuation ==
The Royal was discontinued for the 1960 model year, when the full-size Dodge line was reduced to two trim levels.

== Bibliography ==
- Genat, Robert (2005). Mopar Muscle. Crestline. ISBN 978-0-7603-2374-8.
