= 1958 Dodge =

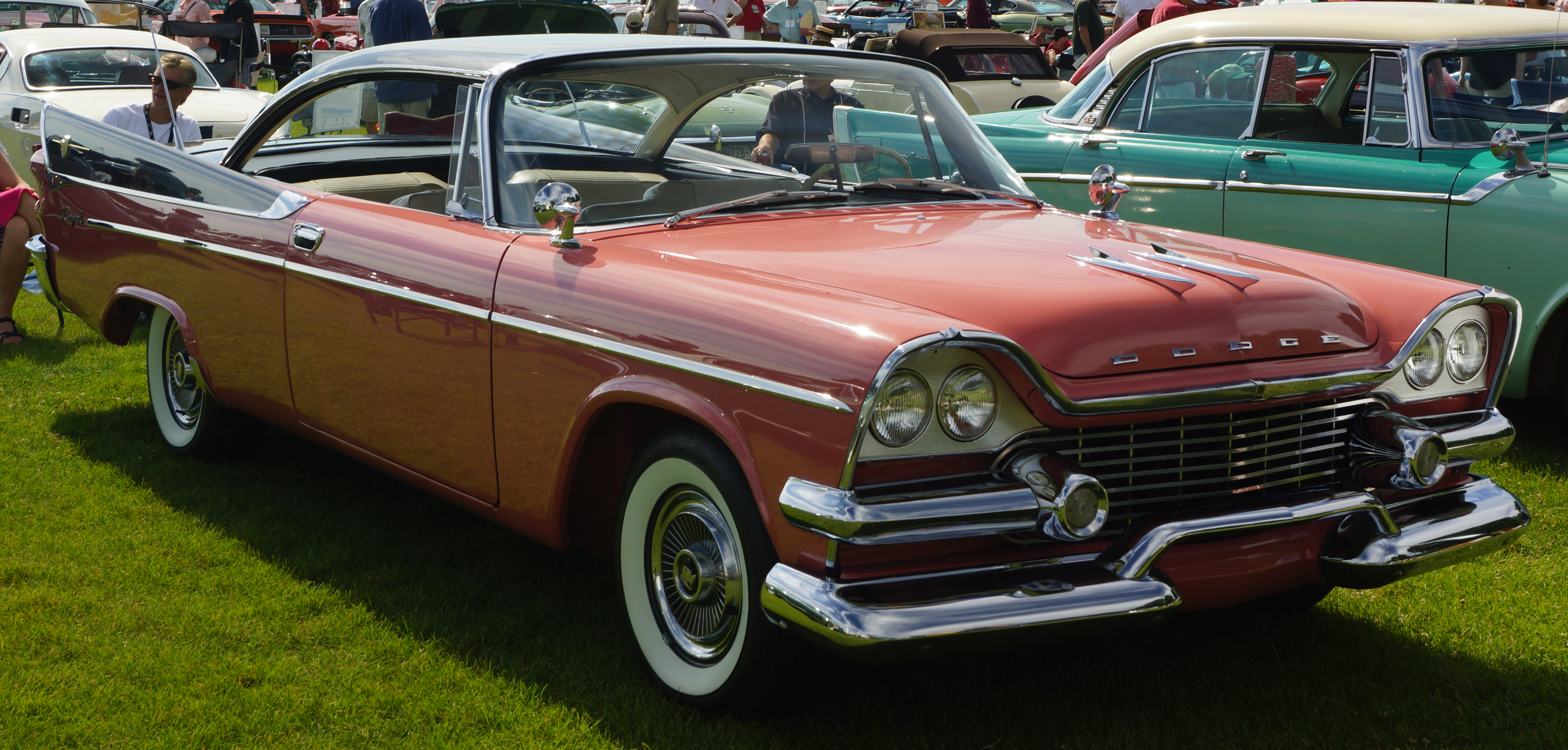
- 1958 Dodge Royal Lancer

Overview
- Manufacturer: Dodge (Chrysler)
- Also called: Dodge Coronet; Dodge D-500; Dodge Royal; Dodge Royal Lancer; Dodge Custom Royal; Dodge Custom Royal Lancer; Dodge Regal Lancer
- Production: 1957–1961
- Model years: 1958–1961

Body and chassis
- Class: Mid-size
- Body style: 2-door coupe 4-door sedan 2-door hardtop coupe 2-door wagon 4-door wagon 2-door convertible
- Layout: FR layout

Powertrain
- Engine: 230 in^{3} (3.8 L) Getaway I6; 325 in^{3} (5.3 L)Red Ram V8; 350 in^{3} (5.7 L) Super Red Ram V8; 361 in^{3} (5.9 L) D-500 V8; 361 in^{3} (5.9 L) Super D-500 V8
- Transmission: 2-speed automatic 3-speed automatic

Chronology
- Predecessor: 1955 Dodge

The Dodge lineup was refreshed for the 1958 model year, continuing the three-line scheme of the 1955 Dodges with the entry-level Coronet, Royal, and ornate Custom Royal. The Regal Lancer was added as a new top-of-the-line model in spring.

== Overview ==
The 1958 Dodges shared their basic mechanicals with the De Soto, but featured special styling. The Coronet lasted through the 1959 model years.

== Coronet ==
The Coronet was the base model. This was the only line to feature the 230 in^{3} (3.8 L) Getaway I6 with 123 hp (92 kW), but the 325 in^{3} (5.3 L) Red Ram (2bbl)/Super Red Ram (4bbl) V8 was an option. Coronets may typically be identified by a script mounted at the trailing edge of the belt-line stainless steel trim strip and a plain "up-sweep" molding of the rear fin trim, where both Royal and Custom Royal had a "dipping" element to the up-sweep trim. Fin cap inserts were painted with a horizontally ribbed pattern. Body styles offered were club sedan, sedan, two-door hardtop (Lancer), four-door hardtop (Lancer), and two-door convertible (Lancer). Lancers were further identified by a lance and shield emblem on each fin.

== Royal ==
The Royal were the next step up. They used only the V8 engine. Identifying exterior characteristics include Royal script at the trailing edge of the belt-line molding, a pronounced "check-mark" at the rear up-sweep of the fin, chrome Dodge block letters on the front of the hood, chrome Dodge script on the passenger side of the trunk, and hood ornaments as standard equipment. Fin cap inserts were anodized with a horizontally ribbed pattern. Body styles offered were sedan, two-door hardtop (Lancer), and four-door hardtop (Lancer). Lancers were further identified by a lance and shield emblem on each fin.

== Custom Royal ==
The flagship model was the Custom Royal. It came with the 350 in^{3} (5.7 L) Ram Fire V8 with a standard two-barrel carburetor, but the optional four-barrel carburetor delivered 300 hp (224 kW). A feature of the Custom Royal was its bumper-mounted exhaust ports which were only available on the Royal and Coronet models as part of the D-500 options. Identifying exterior characteristics include Custom Royal script at the trailing edge of the belt-line molding, the pronounced check-mark, gold anodized Dodge block letters on the hood, and gold anodized Dodge script on the passenger side of the trunk. Fin cap inserts were anodized and had a unique rectangular pattern. All Custom Royals included a stainless molding above the bumper, on the flat edge below the trunk opening. Body styles offered were sedan, two-door hardtop (Lancer), four-door hardtop (Lancer), and two-door convertible (Lancer). Lancers were further identified by a lance and shield emblem on each fin.

== Spring Specials ==
To combat the recession of 1958, the Chrysler Corporation developed a program of spring specials to present a mid-year trim change on most of its makes. The factory-produced spring specials for Dodge included a new wide, full-length belt line molding, grille emblem, fin end-caps, and a wide license plate escutcheon. The Chrysler Corporation also shipped out all of these trim items individually to dealers so the dealers could "freshen up" the cars sitting on their lots. Dealer-installed spring specials often include some elements of the factory spring special trim, but not always all. New exterior colors introduced for spring were Poppy Red, Frosted Turquoise, and Paris Rose.

Unrelated to spring specials, Dodge changed the headlight trim midway through the production run. Later cars have a wide lower edge to the headlight trim while early cars have a thin lower edge.

== Regal Lancer ==
Trying to boost sales, the Regal Lancer model was added in February and only available as a two-door hardtop with special colors, exterior trim and interior. Four color combinations were available: bronze with white trim, bronze with black trim, black with bronze trim, and white with bronze trim. It featured special nameplates at the front of the side spear trim and heavy eyebrow trim. Inside, Regal Lancers got their own interior with unique trim and door panels featuring molded armrests. A bronze instrument panel with textured aluminum inserts was a Regal Lancer exclusive. The standard engine offered for Regal Lancers was the 350 cubic inch displacement "Ram Fire" V8. Optional engine choices were the 361 cubic inch displacement D-500 and Super D-500 iterations. Only 1,163 were produced.

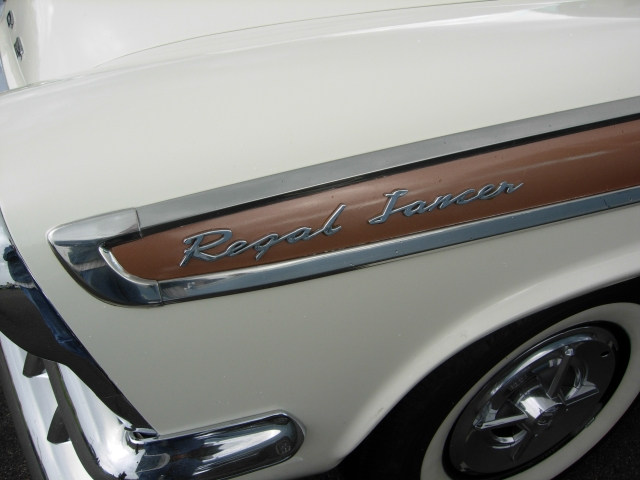
Dodge Custom Royal Regal Lancer name plate

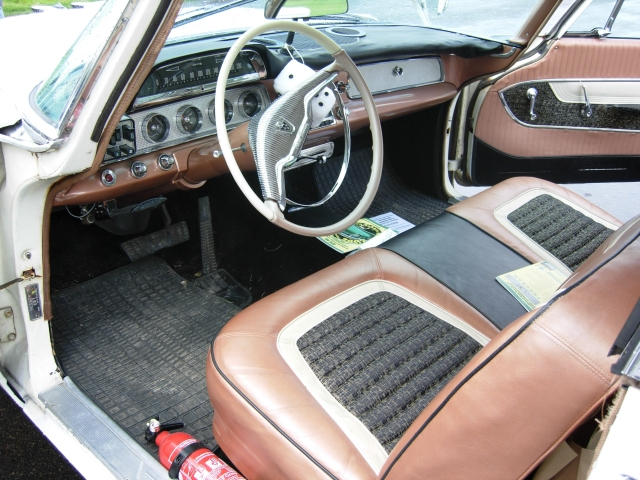
Dodge Custom Royal Regal Lancer interior

== Suburban ==
The Suburban was Dodge's two-door station wagon in 1958. All station wagons came standard with the 350 Ram Fire engine.

== Sierra ==
The entry level four-door station wagon in 1958 was the Sierra. Sierras came in either the six-passenger seat configuration or the nine-passenger "Spectator" seat configuration. From the exterior the nine-passenger configuration can be easily identified by the spare tire panel behind the rear wheel opening and the rubber step-spots on the rear bumper.

== Custom Sierra ==
Custom Sierra wagons were the top-of-the-line station wagon offering for Dodge. As with Sierras, they were available as either six-passenger or Spectators.

== D-500 ==
The D-500 engine option was available across all models and all body styles including station wagons and the Regal Lancer. The D-500 family of engines includes a four-barrel option, a dual four-barrel (Super D-500), and a Bendix electronic fuel injection system for the Super D-500. The Bendix E.F.I. system proved to be troublesome and what few examples were built were recalled to be fitted with the normally aspirated dual four-barrel carburetor system. On passenger cars, the D-500 emblem was located on the driver side of the trunk. On station wagons, the D-500 emblem was located below the tail gate latch. The 1958 D-500 emblem was unique to that year. All D-500s came with bumper mounted exhaust ports.

The California Highway patrol was so impressed with the performance of the new Dodge they ordered 200 vehicles with the D-500 option to be used on patrol duty. This was Chrysler's first move into specialized Police cars, and its success paved the way for decades of special police packages.

Dodge also offered a D-500-1 that was strictly for racing. It set several speed records on the sand at Daytona and the salt flats at Bonneville. They were also designed for NASCAR and drag racing. The D-500-1 package was only available in a Coronet hardtop, convertible or two-door sedan with a manual transmission.

== Paint and Trim Schemes ==
Apart from the spring specials, Dodge offered a variety of paint and trim schemes for 1958. Solid color cars were standard. Two-tone options were: 1) the basic two-tone which had a roof color and a body color, 2) a "deluxe" two-tone, which had the roof, fins, and trunk as one color and the body as another; and 3) a "saddle" two-tone, which had the roof and all of the body below the belt-line trim as one color and the body above the belt-line trim as another; and 4) Regal two-tone, exclusive to the Regal Lancer two-door hardtop. The monotone, basic, and deluxe two-tones all used the "short" belt-line trim with model script behind the trailing edge. The saddle two-tone used the 1957 full-length belt-line trim and placed the model script below the front fender belt-line trim. The Regal Lancer had paint and trim unique to that model.

== Bibliography ==
- "Dodge coronet and Custom Royal". Allpar.com.
- Genat, Robert (2005). Mopar Muscle. Crestline. ISBN 978-0-7603-2374-8.
