= Dodge Coronet =

American car model sold 1949–1959, 1965–1976

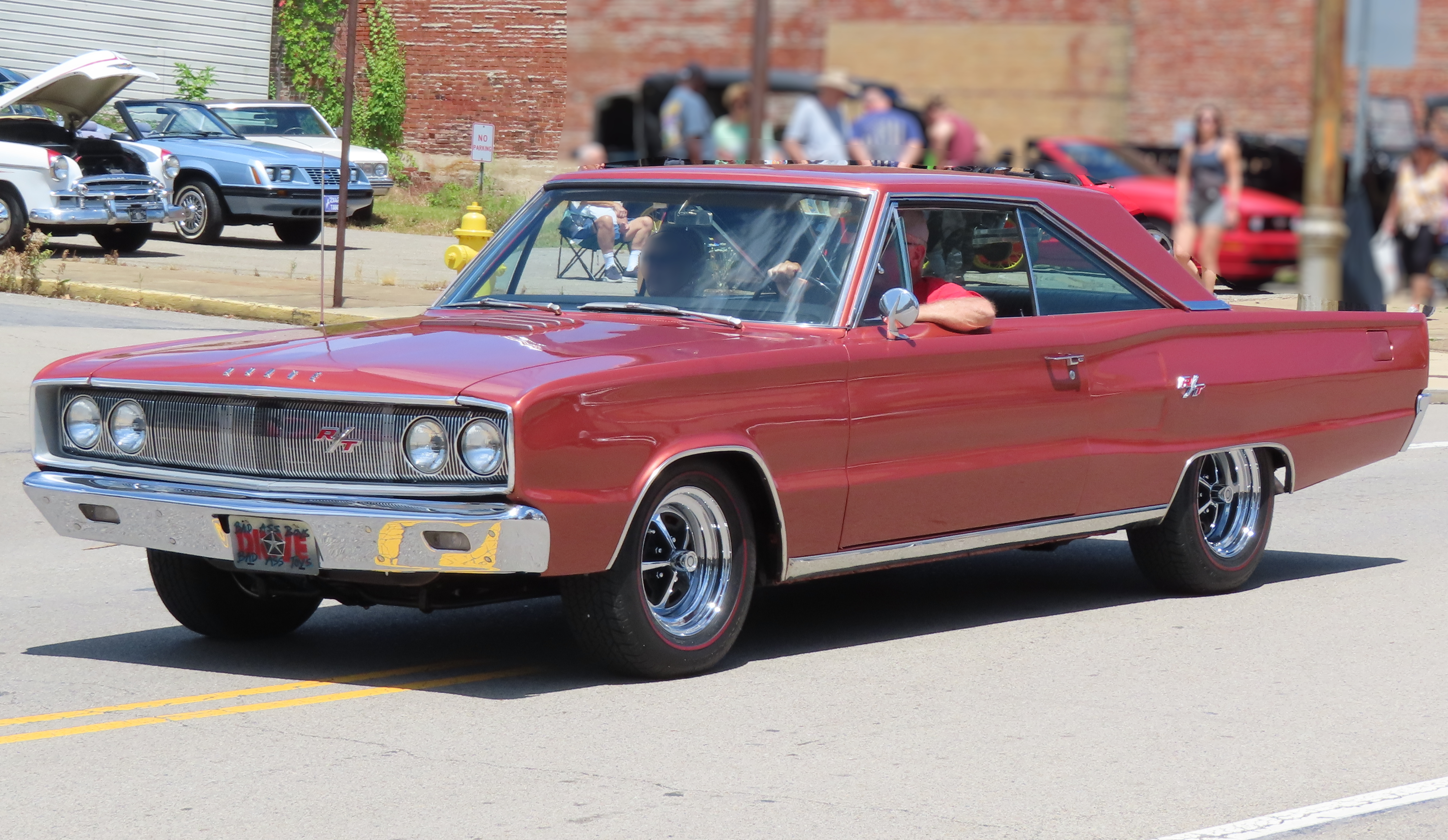
- 1967 Dodge Coronet R/T

Overview
- Manufacturer: Dodge (Chrysler)
- Production: 1949–1959; 1965–1976

Body and chassis
- Class: Full-size (1949–1959); Mid-size (1965–1976)
- Layout: FR layout

Chronology
- Predecessor: Dodge Custom
- Successor: Full-size: Dodge Dart (1960); Dodge Polara (1960); Dodge Matador (1960); Mid-size: Dodge Monaco (1977)

The Dodge Coronet is an automobile that was marketed by Dodge in seven generations, and shared nameplates with the same bodyshell with varying levels of equipment installed. Introduced as a full-size car in 1949, it was the division's highest trim line and moved to the lowest level starting in 1955 through 1959. The name was reintroduced on intermediate-sized models from the 1965 until 1976 model years. Muscle car versions were available starting in 1965 with the 383 and 426 wedge cu in (7.0 L) Chrysler RB engine, followed in 1966 by the powerful 426 cu in (7.0 L) Chrysler Hemi. Other performance models included the "Superbee", and featured, the 383 cu in (6.3 L) Magnum, among other engine options. The nameplate "coronet" is a type of crown worn by royalty.

In the 1980s, the Coronet was used on Dodge models marketed in Colombia.

== First generation (1949–1952) ==
First generation
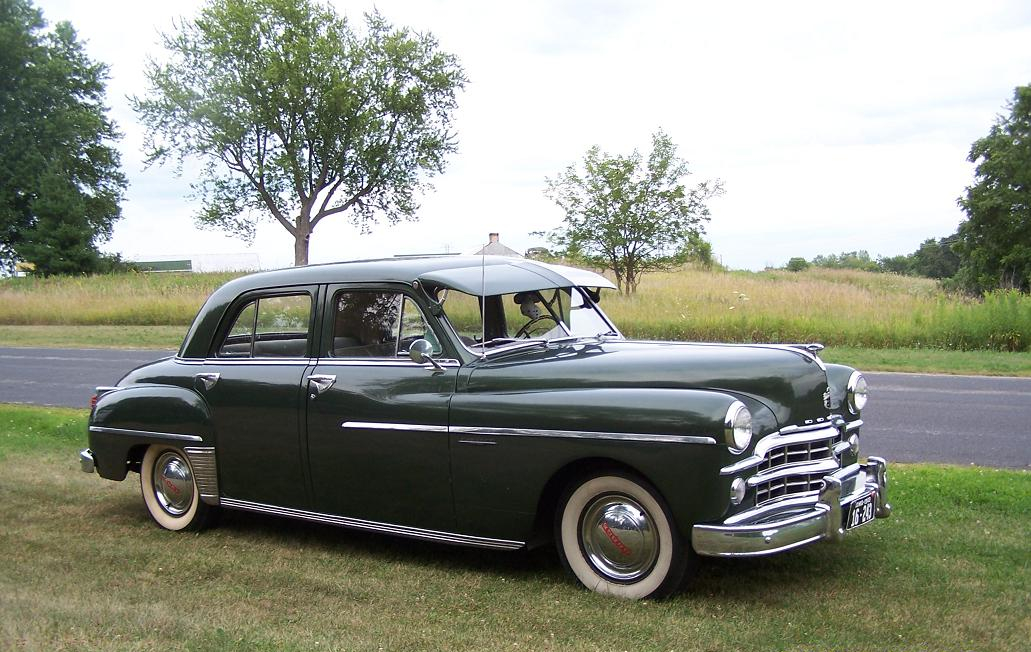
- 1949 Dodge Coronet 4-Door Sedan

Overview
- Production: 1949–1952
- Assembly: United States: Hamtramck, Michigan (Dodge Main Factory); United States: Evansville, Indiana (Evansville Assembly); United States: Maywood, California (Los Angeles Assembly); United States: San Leandro, California (San Leandro Assembly); Canada: Windsor, Ontario (Windsor Assembly)

Body and chassis
- Body style: 2-door coupe; 2-door roadster/Sportabout; 2-door hardtop; 2-door business coupe; 4-door sedan; 4-door limousine (8 passenger); 4-door station wagon
- Related: Chrysler Windsor; DeSoto Custom; Plymouth De Luxe (Canadian Market only); Dodge Regent

Powertrain
- Engine: 230 cu in (3.8 L) Dodge Straight 6
- Transmission: 2-speed automatic 3-speed manual "Gyromatic or Fluid drive"

Dimensions
- Wheelbase: 115 in (2,921 mm); 123.5 in (3,137 mm)
- Length: 203.6 in (5,171 mm) (1949); 202.8 in (5,151 mm) (1950); 195 in (4,953 mm) (1949–1950); 199 7/8 in (5,077 mm) (1951–1952)
- Width: 73 in (1,854 mm) (1949–1952); 74 in (1,880 mm)
- Height: 63 1/2 in (1,613 mm)

The Dodge Coronet was introduced with the division's first postwar body styles. Lower trim lines were the Wayfarer and Meadowbrook, with the Wayfarer being built on a shorter 115 inch wheelbase. The only engine for Dodge was a 230-cubic-inch (3,800 cc) flat-head straight six cylinder engine with a single barrel Stromberg carburetor, producing 103 hp (77 kW) (gross). The stock Dodge Coronet was a smooth-running car, and the six-cylinder engine could power the car to 90 mph (145 km/h). A limited production model was a four-door, eight-passenger limousine, an extended version of the stock Dodge Coronet which was related to the DeSoto Suburban. One of the most notable features of the first-generation Coronet was Chrysler's four forward-speed, a fluid-driven semi-automatic transmission that Dodge Division called Gyromatic. After using the clutch and gear shift to select the high range, upshifts and downshifts were operated by the accelerator pedal on the floor. The clutch did not need to be depressed in stop-and-go driving once underway. It had full instrumentation and 37 inches of head room both front and rear.

All Dodge vehicles received a facelift for 1950 but like the 1949 models were still divided into Wayfarer, Meadowbrook, and Coronet lines. The 1950 models can be identified easily by the new grille design which featured 3 heavy horizontal bars. The upper and lower bars formed a stylish oblong shape. Within this oblong grille was a thick center bar with parking lights on each end and a large chrome plaque in the center bearing the Dodge crest. The 8-passenger sedan's length was 216.8 in (5,507 mm).

Dodge received yet another facelift in 1951 but this time the cars remained virtually unchanged for two model years. Busy manufacturing military vehicles for use in Korea, they chose not to dedicate valuable resources to completely redesign civilian vehicles. Still divided into Wayfarer, Meadowbrook, and Coronet lines through 1952, by 1953 the Wayfarer line had been discontinued. The grille of the 1951 model was similar in shape to the 1950 grille, but with the elimination of the thick vertical center bar and the addition of six vents running horizontally between the top and center bars, a whole new look was achieved. The Coronet Diplomat was Dodge's first hardtop coupe, featuring a pillarless steel roof styled after the contemporary Chrysler Newport. The speedometer was now circular, and the other four gauges were rectangles. For 1952 the Coronet had a painted lower grille louver.

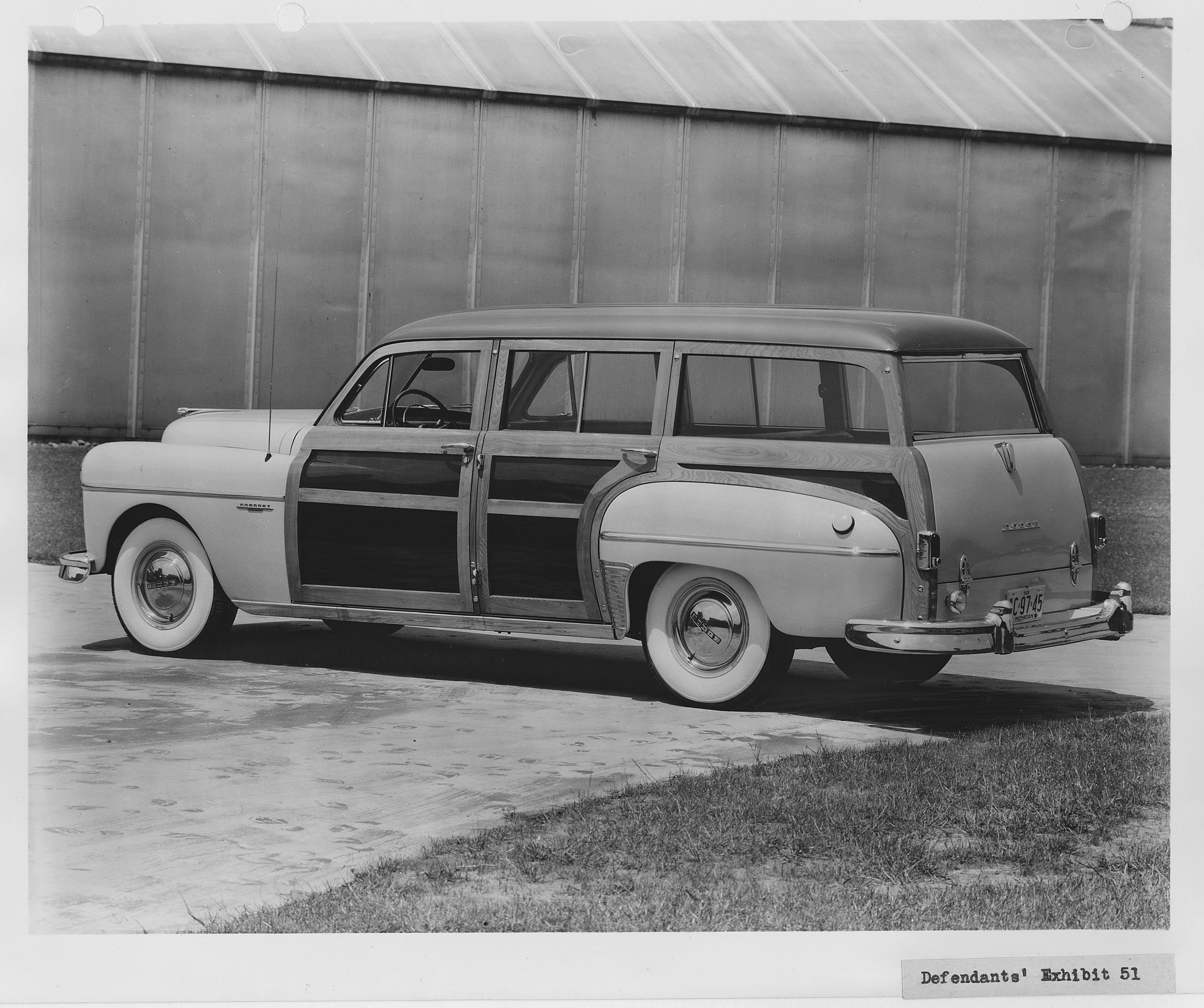
1949 Dodge Coronet station wagon

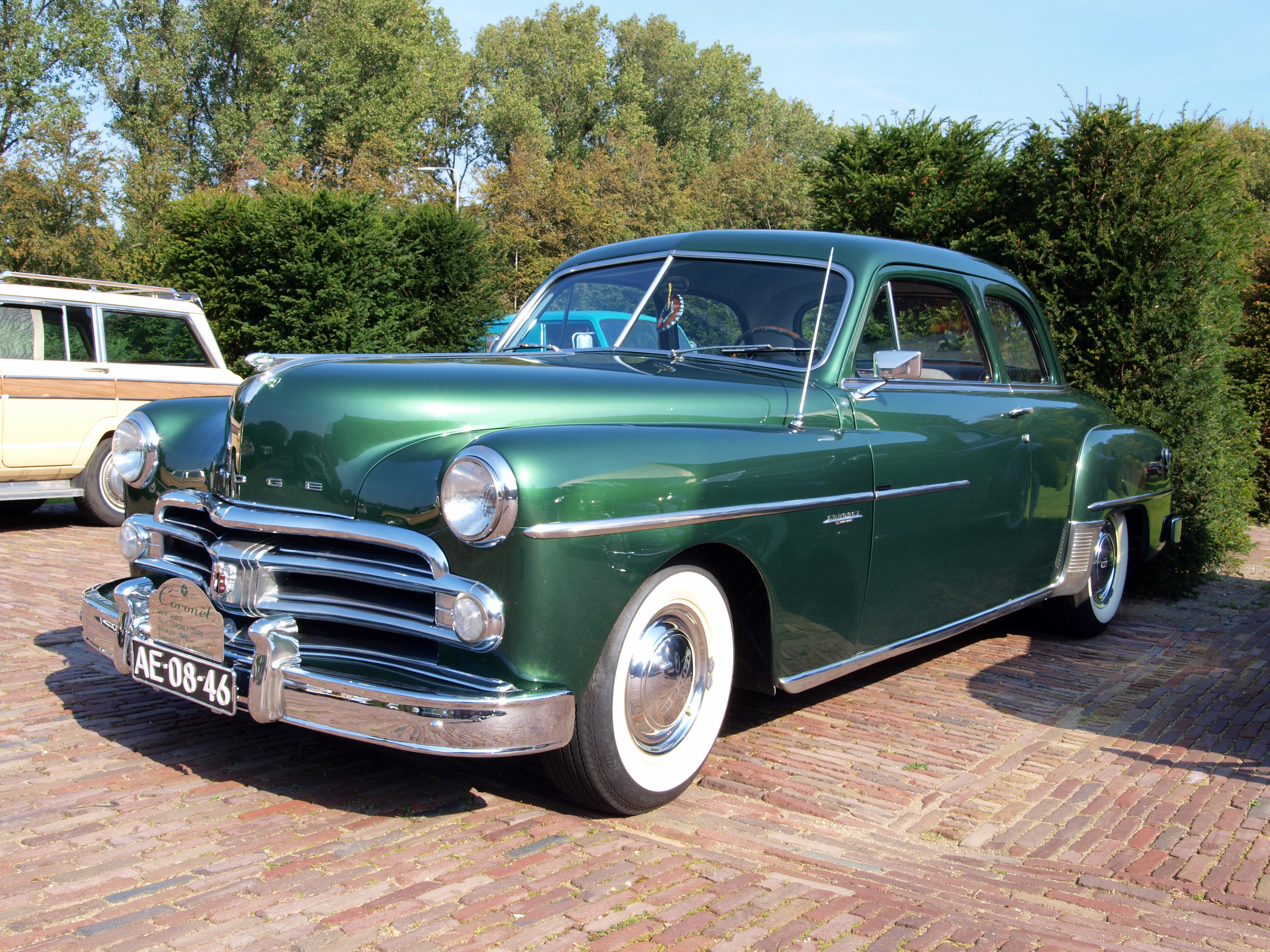
1950 Dodge Coronet Club Coupe

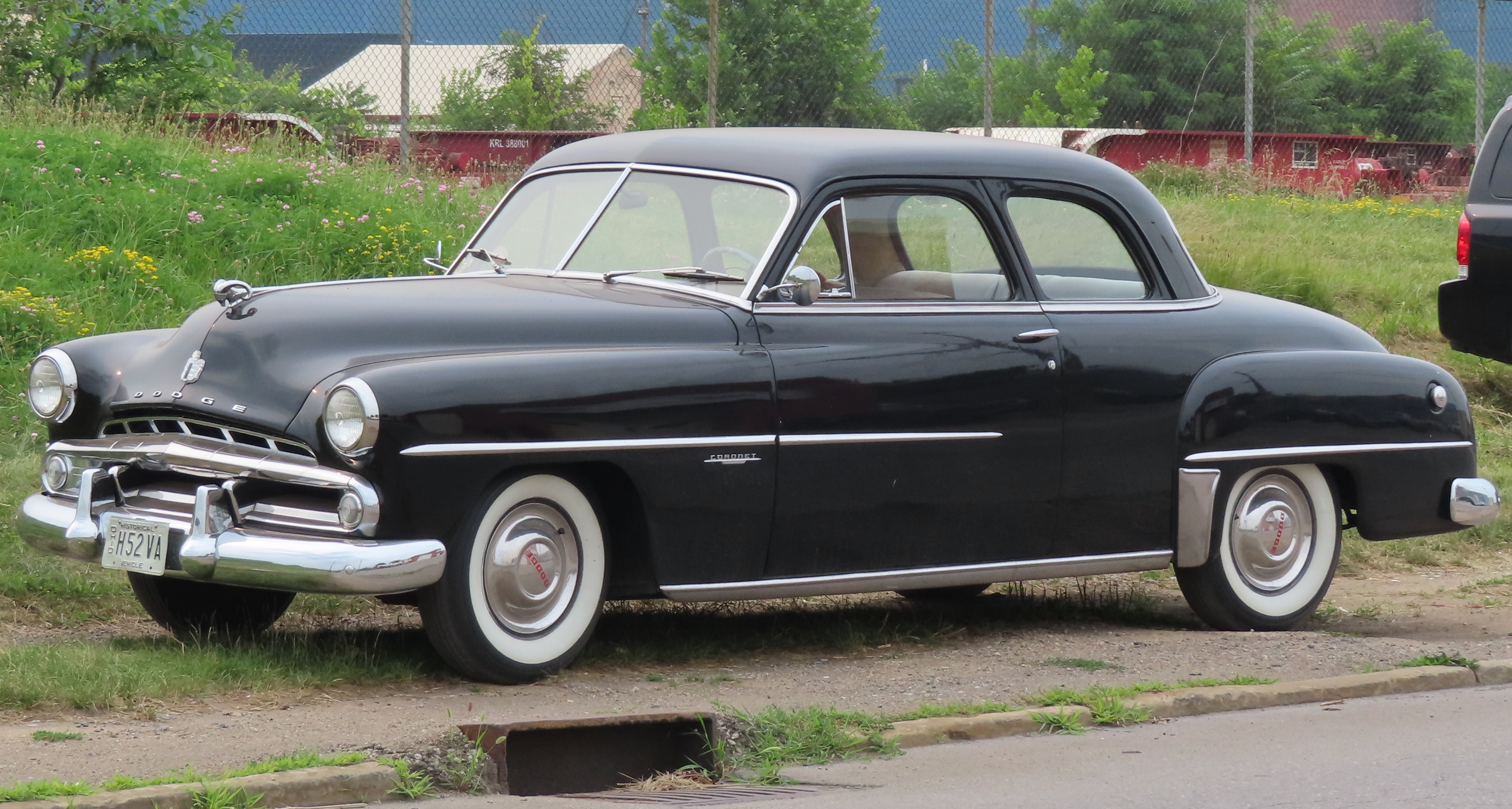
1951 Dodge Coronet Club Coupe

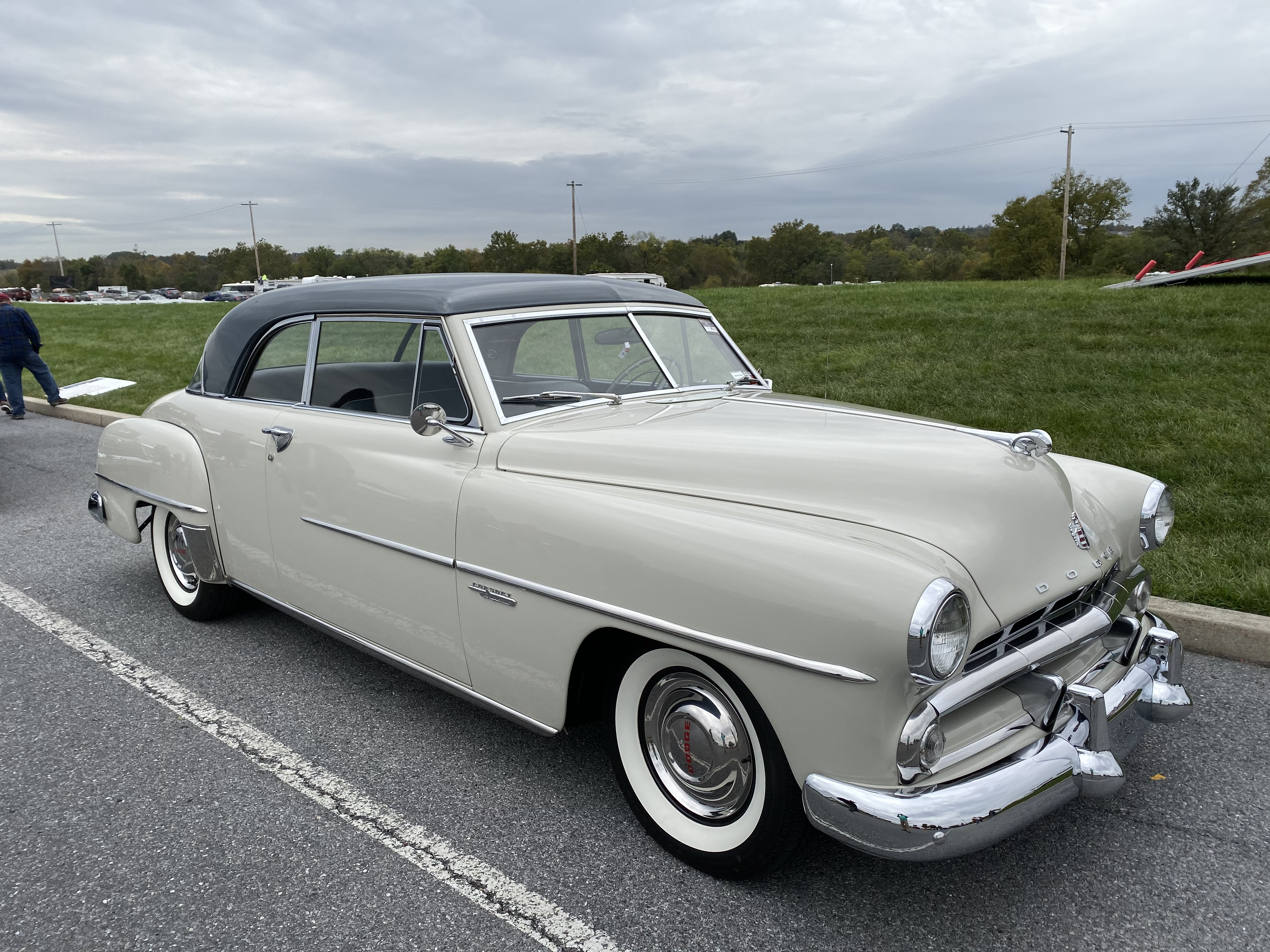
1952 Dodge Coronet Diplomat

== Second generation (1953–1954) ==
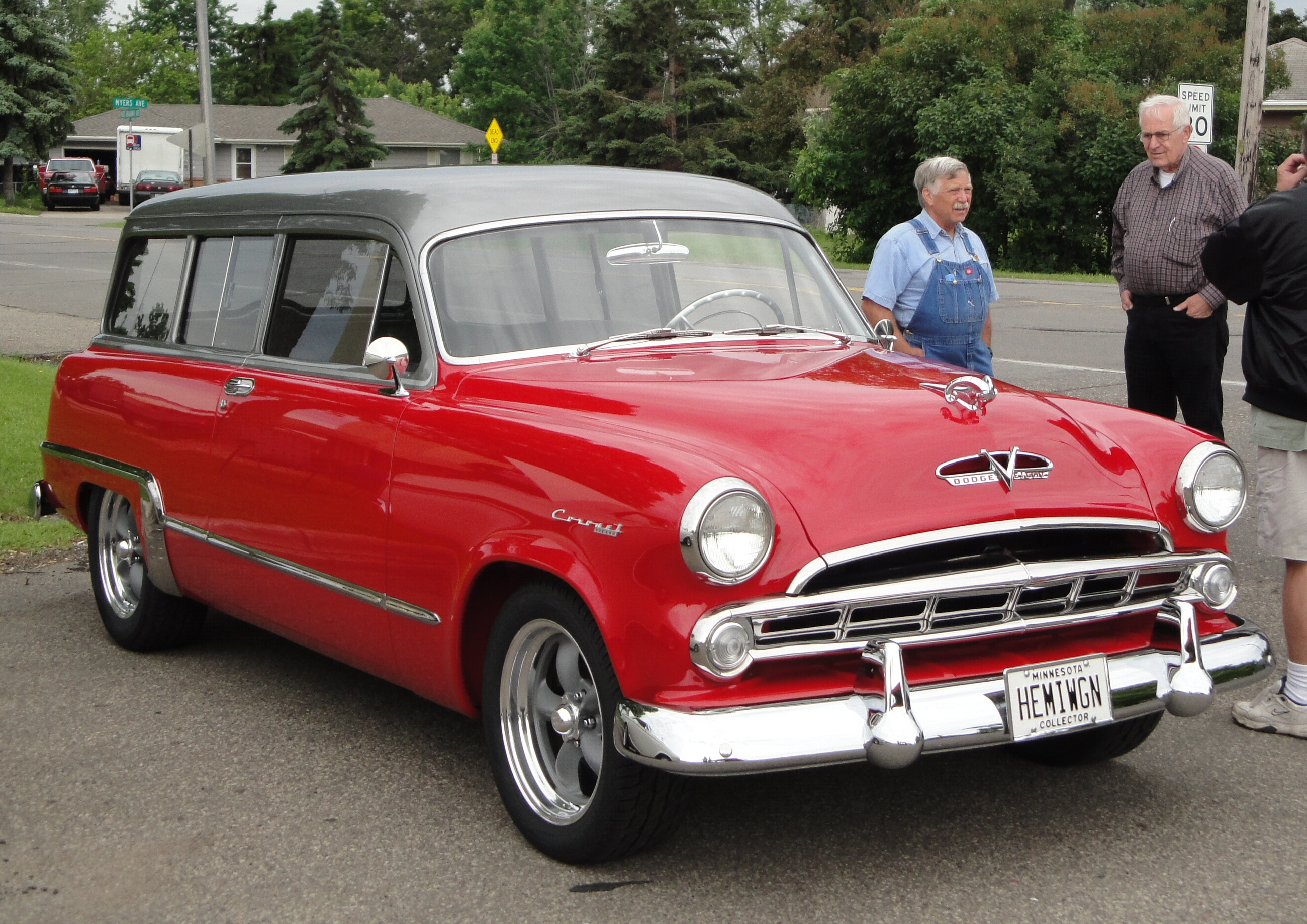
1953 Dodge Coronet Sierra (with non-standard wheels)

Second generation
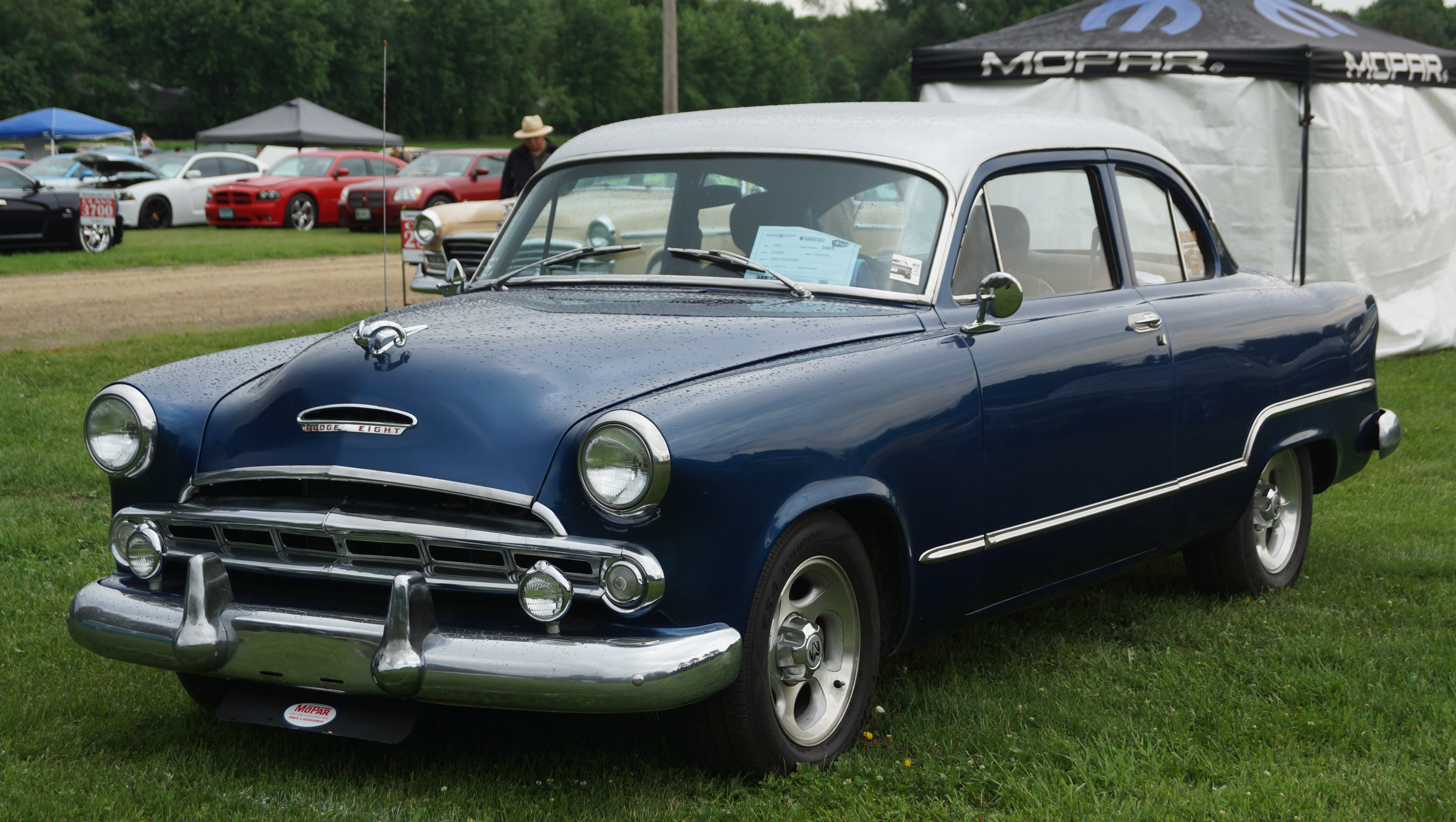
- 1953 Dodge Coronet Club Coupe (with non-standard wheels)

Overview
- Model years: 1953–1954
- Assembly: United States: Hamtramck, Michigan (Dodge Main Factory); United States: Evansville, Indiana (Evansville Assembly); United States: Maywood, California (Los Angeles Assembly); United States: San Leandro, California (San Leandro Assembly); Canada: Windsor, Ontario (Windsor Assembly)

Body and chassis
- Body style: 4-door sedan 2-door coupe 2-door station wagon
- Related: DeSoto Fireflite; Plymouth Belvedere (Canadian market only); Dodge Mayfair

Powertrain
- Engine: 241 cu in (3.9 L) Red Ram V8; 230 cu in (3.8 L) Dodge Straight 6
- Transmission: 2-speed automatic 3-speed manual Gyrol fluid Drive; Gyro-Torque Drive

Dimensions
- Wheelbase: 119 in (3,023 mm)
- Length: 201.4 in (5,116 mm)

For 1953, the Coronet was totally redesigned. It gained an optional 241 cu in (3.9 L) "Red Ram" Hemi Engine and set over 100 land speed records at the Bonneville Salt Flats. The windshield finally became one-piece. Electric windshield wipers were standard, while the radio cost $83.

The Dodge Royal line was added above the Coronet in 1954. Dodge was putting more luxury into all of its models which included the Meadowbrook, Coronet and new Royal lines. Still, styling changes for 1954 were modest. The chrome molding on the hood lip was wider than on the 1953 models and a large chrome upright in the center of the grille replaced the five vertical dividers used previously. It still came with full instrumentation. 1954 saw Chrysler's first fully automatic transmission, two-speed PowerFlite, offered as an extra-cost option on all Dodges.

== Third generation (1955–1956) ==
Third generation
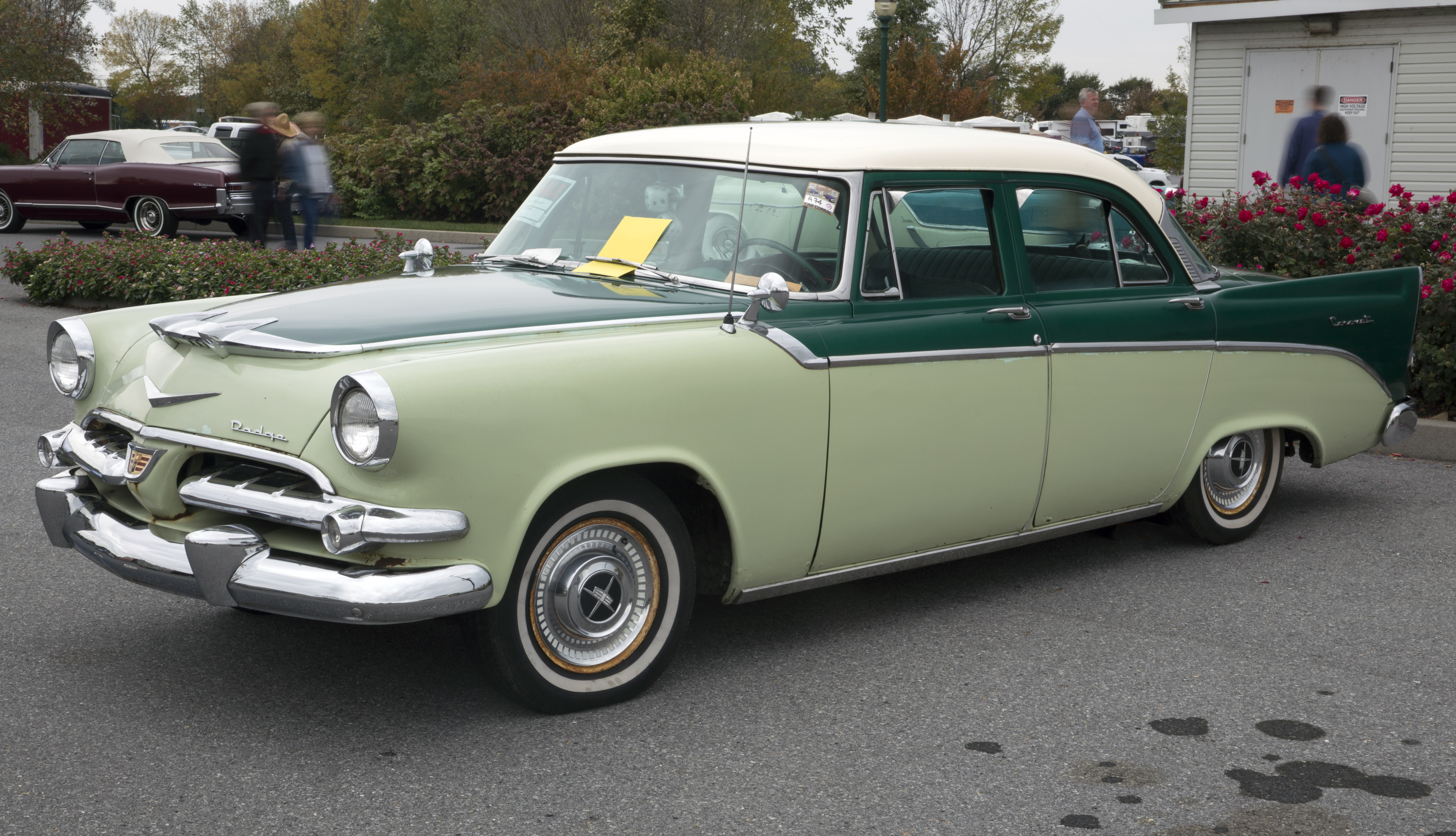
- 1956 Dodge Coronet four-door sedan

Overview
- Model years: 1955–1956
- Assembly: United States: Hamtramck, Michigan (Dodge Main Factory); United States: Evansville, Indiana (Evansville Assembly); United States: Maywood, California (Los Angeles Assembly); United States: San Leandro, California (San Leandro Assembly); Canada: Windsor, Ontario (Windsor Assembly)

Body and chassis
- Body style: 2-door sedan 4-door sedan 2-door hardtop 2-door station wagon 4-door station wagon

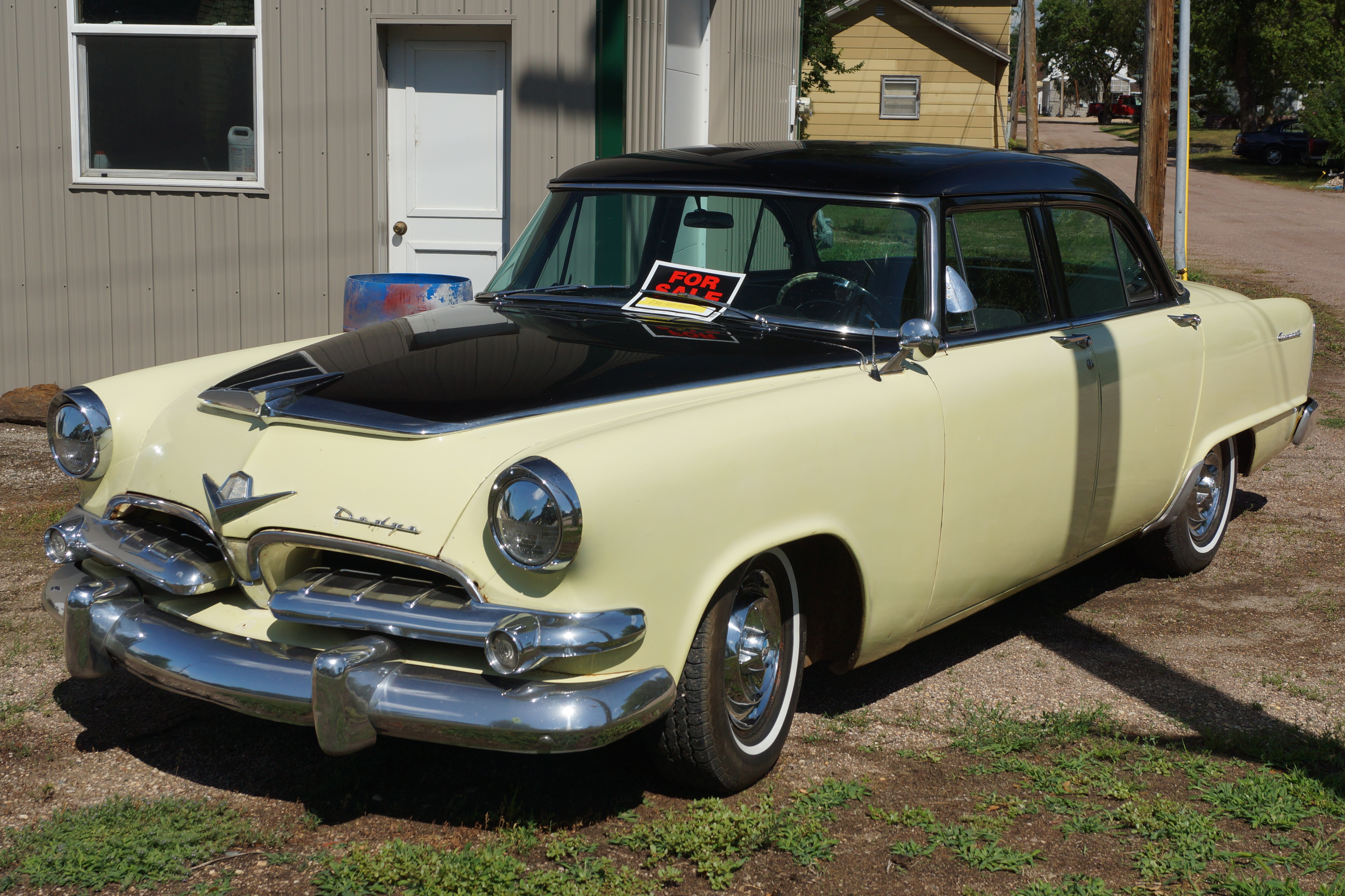
1955 Dodge Coronet 4-door sedan

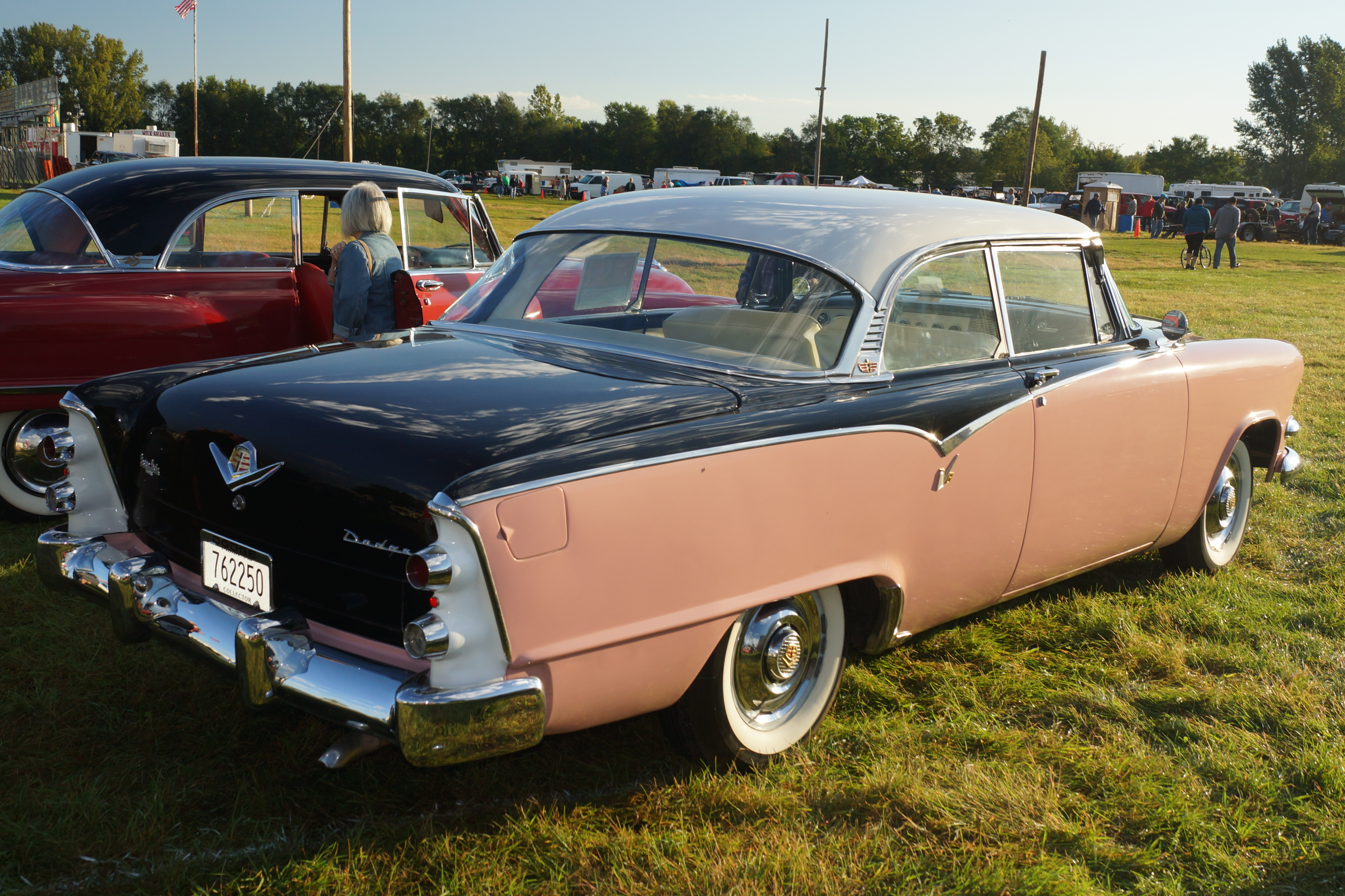
1955 Dodge Coronet Lancer 2-door hardtop

The 1955 Coronet dropped to the lower end of the Dodge vehicle lineup, with the Wayfarer and Meadowbrook names no longer used and the Custom Royal added above the Royal, Lancer, and La Femme. Bodies were restyled with help from newly hired Virgil Exner to be lower, wider, and longer than the lumpy prewar style, which in turn generated a healthy boost in sales over 1954. Power came from either a 230 cu in (3.8 L) Chrysler Flathead engine straight-6, now producing 123 hp (92 kW)

Two V8 engines were offered: 270 cu in (4.4 L) Polyspheric (poly or semi-hemi) heads producing 175 hp (130 kW) and a 315 cu in (5.2 L) (the "Hemi"). Driven almost out of business in 1953 and 1954, the Chrysler Corporation was revived with a $250 million loan from Prudential and new models designed by Virgil Exner. The Dodge lineup was positioned as the mainstream line in Chrysler's hierarchy, between DeSoto and Plymouth.

The Coronet (and Suburban station wagon) was the base model. This was the only line to feature the 230 in^{3} (3.8 L) Getaway I6 as well as the 270 in^{3} (4.4 L) Red Ram V8. Coronets were available in all body styles except the convertible. Sedans feature "Coronet" badges on the fenders, while the station wagons are called "Suburban". Although the hardtop coupe was officially named "Lancer", it wore only "Coronet" badges. Turn signals were standard on the Royal and Custom Royal models but optional on the base Coronet.

Power windows were added to the available options. Wheelbase was 120 inches. They were 212.1 inches long. The trim lines available:

- 2- or 4-door station wagon — The Coronet wagon used the Suburban name and had the V8 or six
- hardtop coupé — The V8 Coronet Lancer
- 2- or 4-door sedan — V8 or Six
- 2-door sedan — V8 or Six
- 4-door, eight-passenger limousine

1956 (See also: Plymouth Fury) was the last year of this body style before the change in 1957, the only differences offered in 1956 from the previous year were trim packages and the new Dodge D-500. The D-500 was the first Dodge factory high-performance production version as a tribute to the (D-500-1) "Super Stock" model. The only external clues were small crossed checkered flags and "500" lettering on its hood and lower rear deck. It was also available for order from the dealer on Coronet models, including station wagons and two-door sedans. The standard D-500 trim included a 315 cu in (5.2 L) V8 with hemispherical heads (unlike other Dodge V8s (List of Chrysler engines) which used Polyspheric heads), a unique camshaft, valve lifters, pushrods, carburetor, ignition, and pistons. With a compression ratio of 9.25:1, four-barrel Carter WCFB carburetor, and dual-point distribution, peak horsepower was 260 bhp (190 kW) while torque was a solid 330 lb⋅ft (450 N⋅m). The D-500 also received an upgraded suspension with stiff front coil springs; heavy-duty Oriflow shock absorbers, with the same valving specified for Dodge police cars, were mounted in the springs. Similar units were used in the rear. The overall height of the D-500 was 1.5 inches (38 mm) lower than its standard Dodge counterpart. The D-500 came standard with 15x5.5 inch wheels with 7.60x15 inch tubeless tires. New for safety were safety door locks. The D-500-1 the first 500 made required by NASCAR, was intended for NASCAR competition. The D-500-1 had an even stiffer suspension than the D-500. Under the hood, the engine received larger valves (about 18% larger), a full-race camshaft, and a double log intake manifold that used two four-barrel Carter WCFB carburetors and a shaved deck for 8.25:1 compression. The 285 bhp (213 kW) meant it was the fastest car that year from the factory.

== Fourth generation (1957–1959) ==
Fourth generation
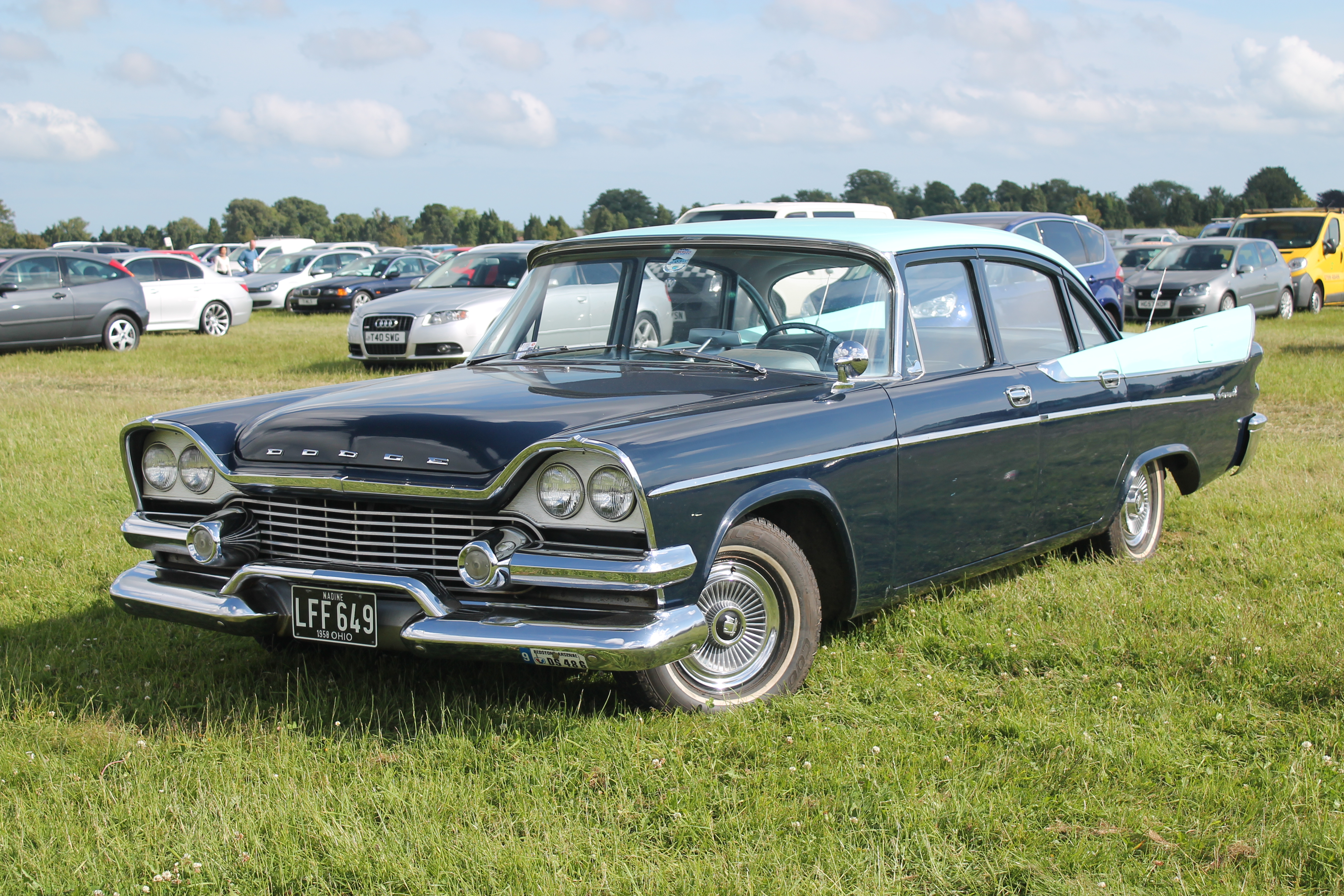
- 1958 Dodge Coronet 4-Door Sedan

Overview
- Also called: Dodge D-501
- Production: 1957–1959
- Assembly: United States: Hamtramck, Michigan (Dodge Main Factory); United States: Maywood, California (Los Angeles Assembly); United States: Newark, Delaware (Newark Assembly)

Body and chassis
- Body style: 2-door coupe 4-door sedan 4-door station wagon 2-door convertible
- Related: Chrysler Saratoga; Chrysler Windsor; DeSoto Firedome; Plymouth Belvedere

Powertrain
- Engine: 354 cu in (5.8 L) Chrysler FirePower V8; 325 cu in (5.3 L) "Red Ram"; 230 cu in (3.8 L) "Getaway" L-head straight-6

Dimensions
- Wheelbase: 122 in (3,099 mm); 126 in (3,200 mm)
- Length: 218 in (5,537 mm) (1957); 222.1 in (5,641 mm) (1959)
- Width: 78.2 in (1,986 mm) (1957)

Chronology
- Successor: Dodge Dart (1960); Dodge Matador (1960); Dodge Polara (1960–61); Dodge Custom 880 (full-size 1962)

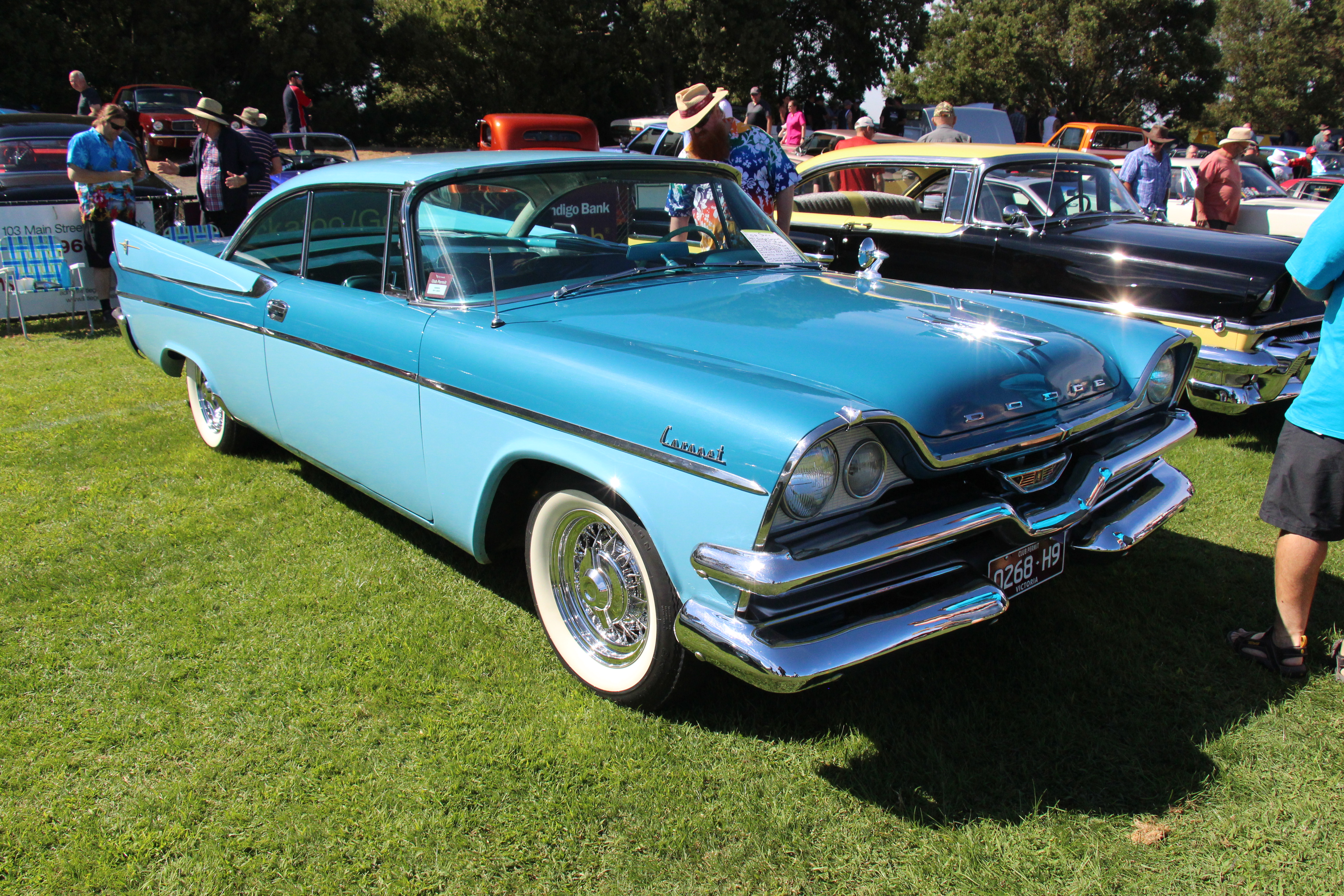
1957 Dodge Coronet Lancer 2-Door Hardtop

The 1957 model year debuted a new D-501, which replaced the D-500 from the year before as the top Coronet. The D-501 received Chrysler's proven 354 cu in (5.8 L) Hemi V8, which were actually leftover engines from the 1956 Chrysler 300B production. Camshafts from the 1957 Chrysler 392 cu in (6.4 L) engines were installed in the 354 cu in (5.8 L) V8s. A pair of Carter four-barrel carburetors fed the 10.0:1 compression ratio to produce 340 bhp (250 kW), shared with the DeSoto Adventurer and the Chrysler 300C. Other changes included the addition of the Torsion-Aire Ride (torsion bar) front suspension and a heavy-duty suspension with heavy-duty shock absorbers and a heavy-duty leaf-sprung rear. A 3.73:1 rear axle was standard with the three-speed manual transmission and automatic cars included a 3.18:1 rear axle. There were 13 optional rear axles available, ranging from 2.92:1 through 6.17:1. The D-501 received 7.60x15 tires on 15x8-inch wheels. Brakes were 12-inch (300 mm) diameter drums. Only 101 D-501s were produced. A padded dash was optional.

In the September 1957 issue of Popular Mechanics, owners of both the Coronet six-cylinder and eight-cylinder were surveyed. Many (37.6% of I6 owners and 34.8% of V8 owners) complained that there were too many water leaks. When PM tested a V8 Coronet for water resistance, water got into the engine and pooled in "two spark plug wells" which had to be siphoned out before the engine could run with all cylinders again. However, many did like the exterior styling and the ride comfort. Acceleration from 0-60 mph on 90 octane gasoline was 12.3 seconds.

The 1958 and 1959 Coronet, Royal, and Custom Royal used a DeSoto Fireflite chassis but had less ornate trim. Power came from the 230 cu in (3.8 L) "Getaway" L-head straight-6 or the 325 cu in (5.3 L) "Red Ram" V8. In 1959 a Silver Challenger model was also offered on the Coronet line. This was a six-cylinder or V-8 model available only in silver paint and only on a two-door body. It came with many extra features at no cost, such as wall-to-wall deep pile carpeting, premium white wall tires and wheel covers, luxury fabrics and upgraded interior and electric windshield wipers. The overall length was increased to 217.4 inches.

A Dodge Coronet was the only known example of the JATO Rocket Car legend. To publicize Dodge's 'total contact' front dual-leading shoe drum brakes a JATO unit was fitted to a 1958 Coronet and driven at speed across the El Mirage dry lake. A TV advertisement was broadcast during Dodge-sponsored Lawrence Welk Show.

=== 1959 Dodge Silver Challenger ===
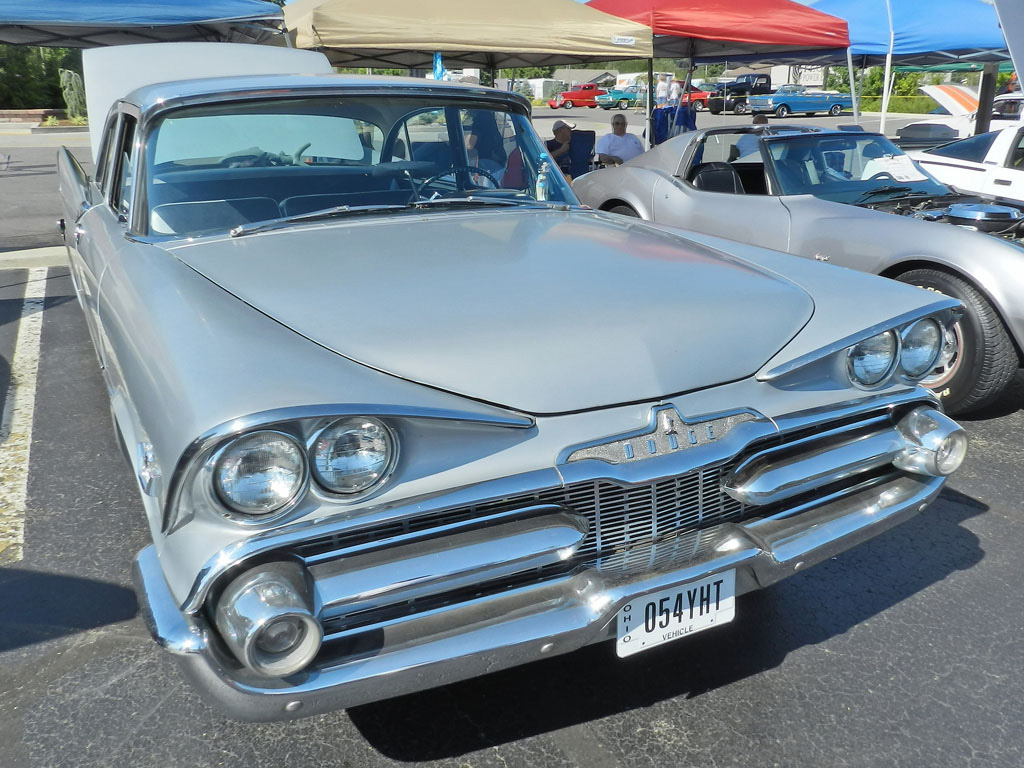
1959 Dodge Silver Challenger

The first car that carried the Challenger name was introduced as the limited edition Dodge Silver Challenger Club Sedan, an addition to the 1959 full-sized Dodge Coronet model line. and was related to the Dodge Matador.

The Silver Challenger came only in silver paint and exclusively on Chrysler's 217.4 in (5,520 mm) long two-door, on a 122 in (3,100 mm) wheelbase. It was available with either the 230 cu in (3.8 L) "Getaway" L-head straight-six engine for $2,297 ($25,369 in 2025 dollars), or the 326 cu in (5.3 L) "Red Ram" V8 for $2,408 ($26,595 in 2025 dollars). This car was marketed for the spring selling season to "new-car buyers who've been waiting to get the most for the least." A column-shifted three-speed manual transmission was standard and an automatic was optional.

The 1959 Silver Challenger was marketed with extra features at no extra cost. These included premium white wall tires, full wheel covers, electric windshield wipers, as well as an upgraded interior with silver metallic vinyl and black "Manchu" fabric upholstery, dual arm rests and sun visors, as well as deep pile wall-to-wall carpeting.

== Fifth generation (1965–1970) ==
=== 1965–1967 ===
Fifth generation
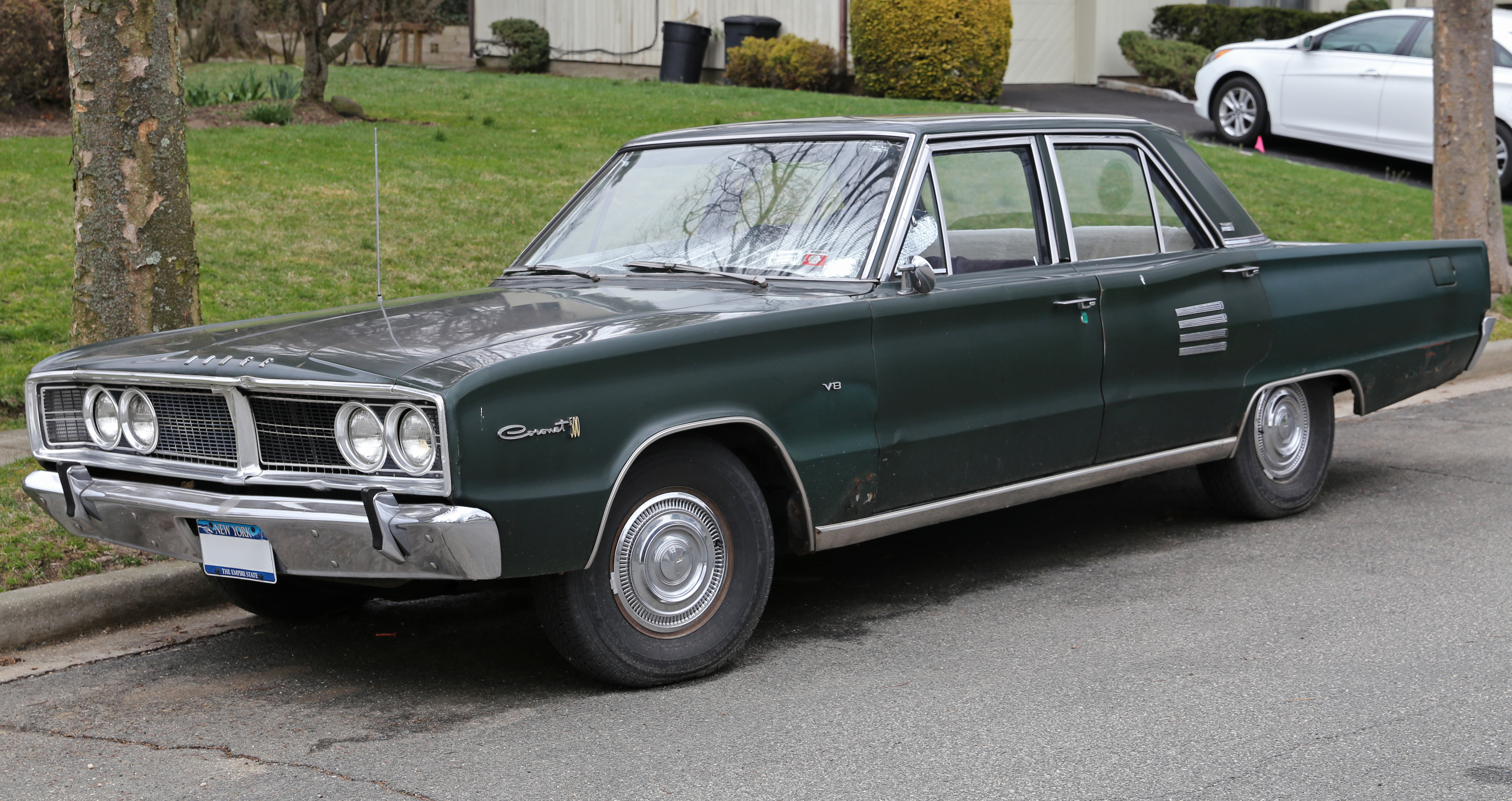
- 1966 Dodge Coronet 500 SE

Overview
- Production: 1965–1970
- Assembly: United States: Detroit, Michigan (Lynch Road Assembly); United States: Maywood, California (Los Angeles Assembly); United States: Fenton, Missouri (Saint Louis Assembly)
- Designer: Elwood Engel, Virgil Exner

Body and chassis
- Body style: 4-door wagon (1965–1970); 4-door sedan (1965–1970); 2-door sedan (1965–1967); 2-door coupe (1968–1970); 2-door hardtop (1965–1970); 2-door convertible (1965–1970)
- Platform: B-body
- Related: Plymouth Belvedere; Dodge Charger; Plymouth GTX; Plymouth Road Runner

Powertrain
- Engine: 225 cu in (3.7 L) Slant-6 I6; 273 cu in (4.5 L) LA V8; 318 cu in (5.2 L) A V8; 318 cu in (5.2 L) LA V8; 361 cu in (5.9 L) B V8; 383 cu in (6.3 L) B "Magnum" V8; 426 cu in (7.0 L) Hemi V8; 440 cu in (7.2 L) RB "Magnum" V8
- Transmission: 3-speed manual 4-speed manual 3-speed automatic

Dimensions
- Wheelbase: 116.0 in (2,946 mm); Wagon: 117.0 in (2,972 mm)
- Length: 209.7 in (5,326 mm)

The Coronet reappeared for the 1965 model year as the intermediate-sized B-body using a 117-inch wheelbase, continuing what had been the Dodge Polara, which was once again full-size. For 1965, Dodge sold slightly over 209,000 units, making the Coronet the most popular model sold by Dodge that year. Trim levels initially were base Coronet, Coronet 440, and Coronet 500.

The base Coronet was available as two-door sedans, four-door sedans, and station wagons. Front seat belts and padded dash were standard.

The middle of the Coronet line-up was the 440 which was available as a two-door hardtop, convertible, or station wagon. The 440 designation did not indicate engine displacement as commonly assumed (both then and now, which helped sales to an extent). The nomenclature was a carryover theme from the 1963–64 Polara series. The top of the Coronet line-up was the Coronet 500 which was available as a two-door hardtop or convertible in 1965. Slightly over 33,300 units were sold in 1965 and included as standard, a V8 engine (273 cubic inches), exterior trim and badging, bucket seats, padded dash, and chrome floor console.

Coronets were manufactured at Chrysler's Los Angeles assembly plant, the Lynch Road assembly plant in Detroit, and the St. Louis plant in Missouri. Engines offered for 1965 included the base 225 Slant-Six, and optional 273, 318, 361, 383, and 426 V8s, the latter available with either single or dual four-barrel carburetors. Sales brochures list the 413 (its last year offered) as available, but no records exist of this engine, commonly used in Imperials, being installed in Coronets for 1965. A tachometer was optional.

In 1966 a four-door Coronet 500 was added, called the Coronet 500 SE (Special Edition). It had special "SE" logos on the C-pillars and on the seatback. There would be no Coronet 500 wagon until 1968. Coronet received a redesign in 1966, and a facelift in 1967. Trim levels initially were base Coronet, Coronet 440, and Coronet 500. In 1966, the Coronet Deluxe was introduced, fitting between the base Coronet and the Coronet 440. The Coronet R/T was introduced in 1967.

The Coronet R/T was available as a two-door hardtop or convertible. The standard engine was Chrysler's largest, the 440 cu in (7.2 L) V8 producing 375 bhp and dubbed the Magnum. The only engine option was the 426-cid Hemi, now in its second year in "Street" trim and again rated at 425 bhp. It was a $908 option. Transmission choices were Mopar's excellent heavy-duty three-speed TorqueFlite automatic or a four-speed manual.

When the 426ci Hemi was made available to the general public for the 1966 model year, it could be ordered in any Coronet model or trim level. No Hemi-powered Coronet wagons have been verified, but a few Coronet Deluxe four-door sedans are known to exist. A total of 136 Coronet 500 Street Hemis were built for 1966. Beginning in 1967, Chrysler decided that the Hemi should be available only in their badged muscle cars: the Dodge Charger, Coronet R/T, and the Plymouth Belvedere GTX. The top engine option for the rest of the Coronet line was supposed to be the 383-ci, 4-barrel V8. Despite this, some Hemi-powered 1967 Coronet Deluxe two-door sedans were produced. There is also one Hemi-powered 1967 Coronet 440 two-door hardtop known, and One Hemi-powered 1967 Coronet 500 two-door hardtop known, which is not among the 55 WO23 Super Stock cars produced for Dodge drag racers.

=== 1968–1970 ===
The Coronet and similar Plymouth Belvedere received complete redesigns in 1968, as did the Dodge Charger, which shared the B-body platform. There was a mild facelift in 1970. Trim levels initially included the base Coronet, Coronet Deluxe, Coronet 440, Coronet 500, and Coronet R/T. The Coronet Super Bee was introduced in early 1968 as a companion to the Plymouth Road Runner. In keeping with Dodge's position as a step above Plymouth, the Super Bee shared the Charger's Rallye instrument cluster and the Coronet 440's rear finish panel.

As in 1967, the 440ci RB V8 was only available in the Coronet R/T in 1968. The 426ci Hemi V8 was supposed to be limited to the R/T and Super Bee, but two 1968 Coronet 440s are known to have been built with this engine.

In mid-1969, the A12 package was introduced on the Super Bee. It included a 390 hp (291 kW) version of the 440 with three 2bbl Holley carburetors on an aluminum intake manifold, a black fiberglass lift-off hood secured with metal pins, heavy-duty suspension, and 15-inch steel wheels with no hubcaps or wheel covers. The hood had an integrated forward-facing scoop which sealed to the air cleaner assembly and bore a decal on each side with the words "SIX PACK" in red letters, "Six Pack" being the name used for the 6-bbl induction setup when installed on a Dodge (Plymouth went with "440 6bbl" on the A12 Road Runners). The A12 Super Bee could be had with most Super Bee options, with the exception of air conditioning and tire-wheel packages. The A12 option was a 1969-only package, but the 440 6bbl returned in 1970 as an optional engine on the Super Bee. This engine option was exclusive to the Super Bee and not available on any other Coronet.

The base Coronet and Deluxe were available as 2-door coupes, 4-door sedans, or station wagons. The base Coronet was dropped in 1969, leaving the Deluxe as the lowest trim level through 1970. The Coronet 440 convertible was dropped for 1968, but a 2-door coupe was added along with the 2-door hardtop, 4-door sedan, and station wagon. This would remain the lineup through 1970. Coronet 500 retained its 2-door hardtop, convertible, and 4-door sedan through 1970. A Coronet 500 station wagon made its debut in 1968, continuing through 1970. Simulated woodgrain trim was standard on the Coronet 500 wagon.

The Coronet R/T 2-door hardtop and convertible continued through 1970.

The Super Bee was available as a 2-door coupe or 2-door hardtop. Chrysler displayed a convertible with Super Bee stripes at car shows in 1968, but never offered it as a production model.

The Dodge Super Bee was a limited-production muscle car from 1968 through 1971. The original Super Bee was based on the Dodge Coronet, a 2-door model, and was produced from 1968 until 1970. It was Dodge's low-priced muscle car, the equivalent to Plymouth Road Runner, and was priced at $3,027. Available with the Hemi engine, this option increased the price by 33% thus 125 models were sold with this engine option. The Super Bee included a heavy-duty suspension, an optional Mopar A-833 four-speed manual transmission, high-performance tires, and a stripe (with the bee logo) wrapped around the tail. The name "Super Bee" was derived from the "B" Body designation given Chrysler's mid-size cars which included the Coronet.

A “six-pack” (three two-barrel carburetors) version of the 440 engine was added to the list mid-year. This engine was between the standard engine and the Hemi as a $463 option. The 1969 model year included the base 383 hp (high performance) with the 440 six-pack and 426 Hemi optional. The 440 Magnum (4-bbl) was not available in the Coronet R/T.

In 1970, the Super Bee was given a different front-end look that consisted of a dual oval-shaped grille that was referred to as “bumble bee wings”. Engines, as well as the "ramcharger" hood (that carried over from the 1969 model). Sales fell for the 1970 model. In 1970, four Super Bee convertibles were built.

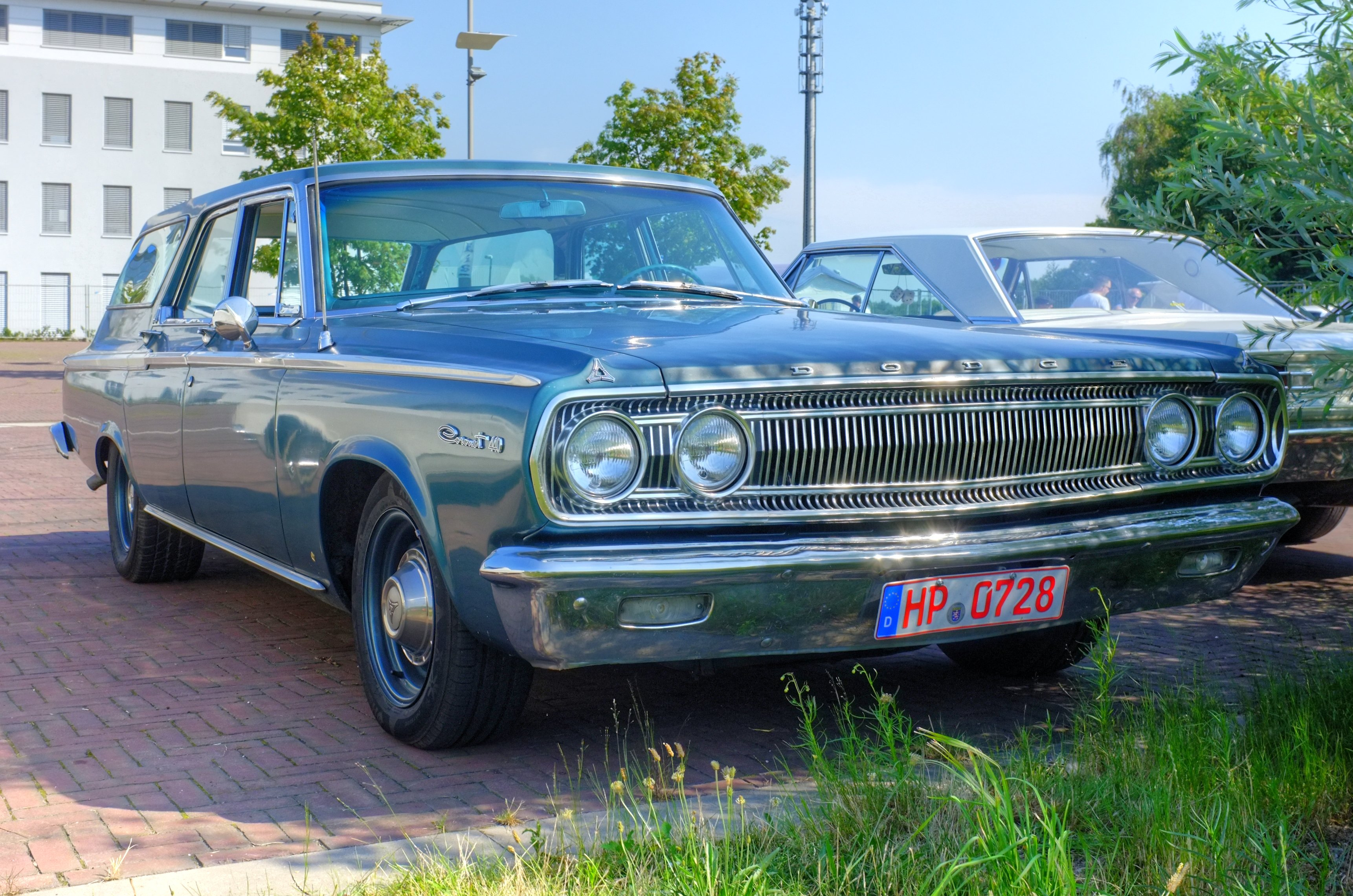
1965 Dodge Coronet 440 4-Door Station Wagon

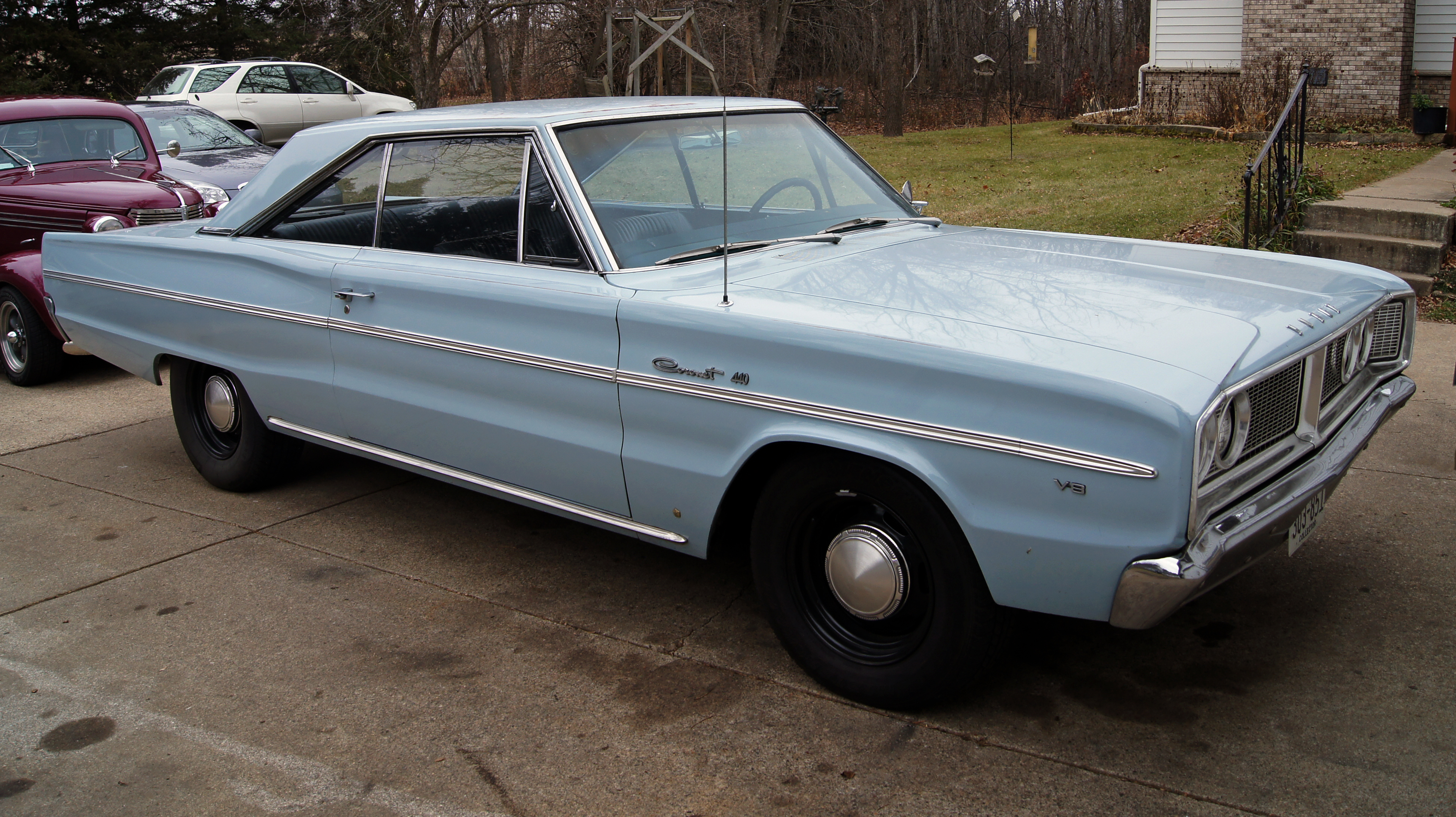
1966 Dodge Coronet 440 2-door hardtop

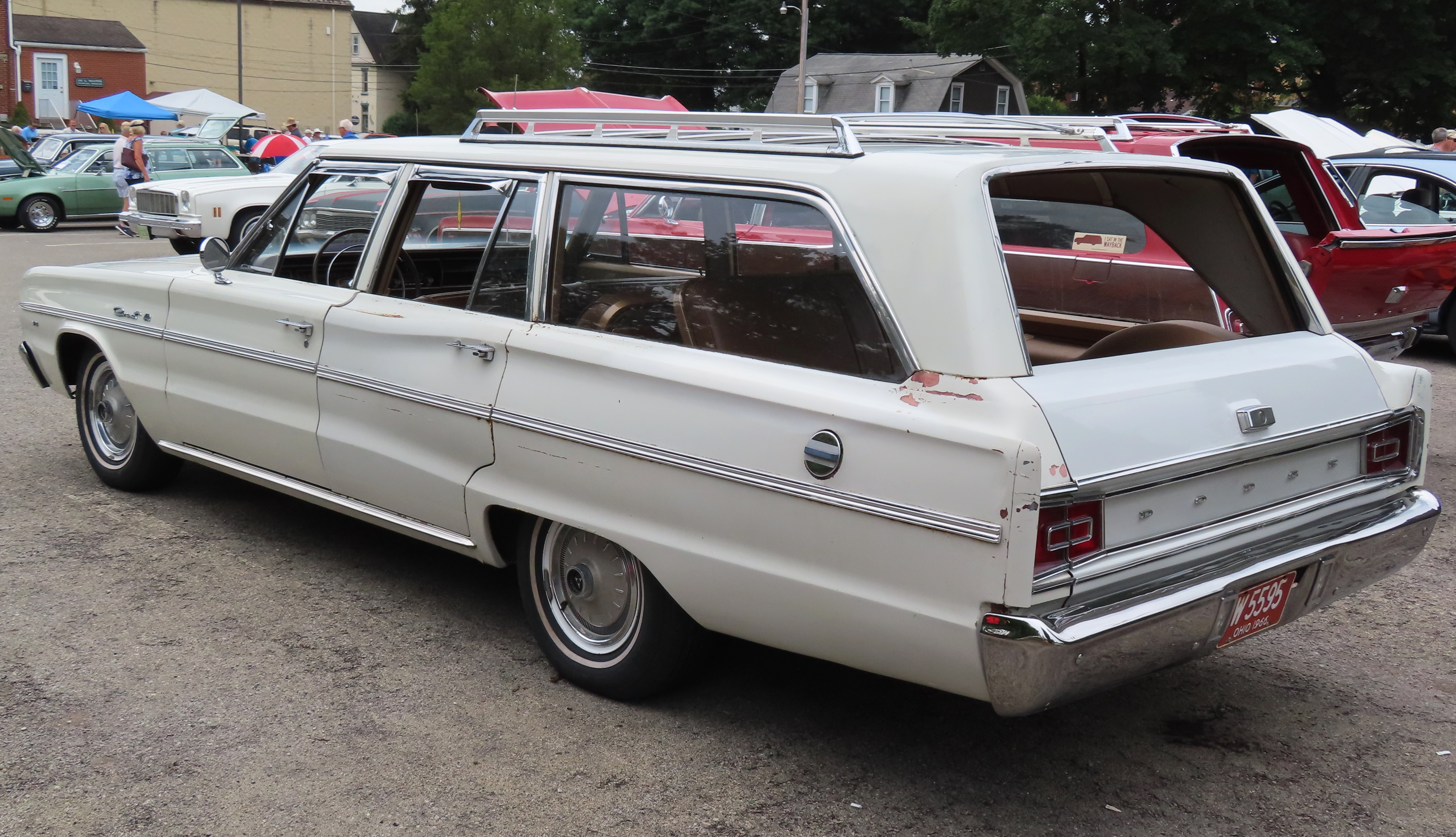
1966 Dodge Coronet 440 station wagon

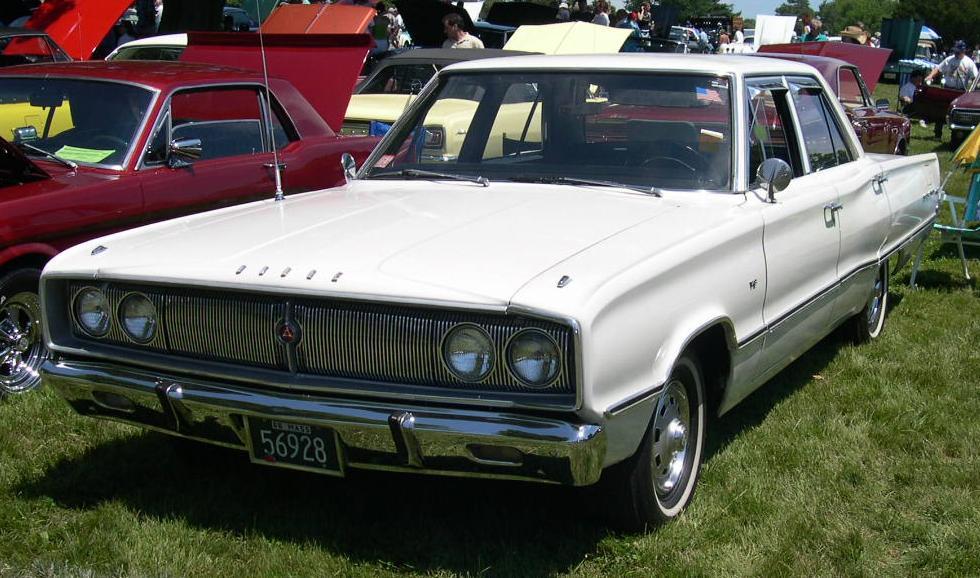
1967 Dodge Coronet 4-door sedan

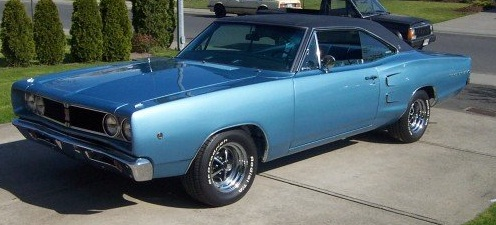
1968 Dodge Coronet 500

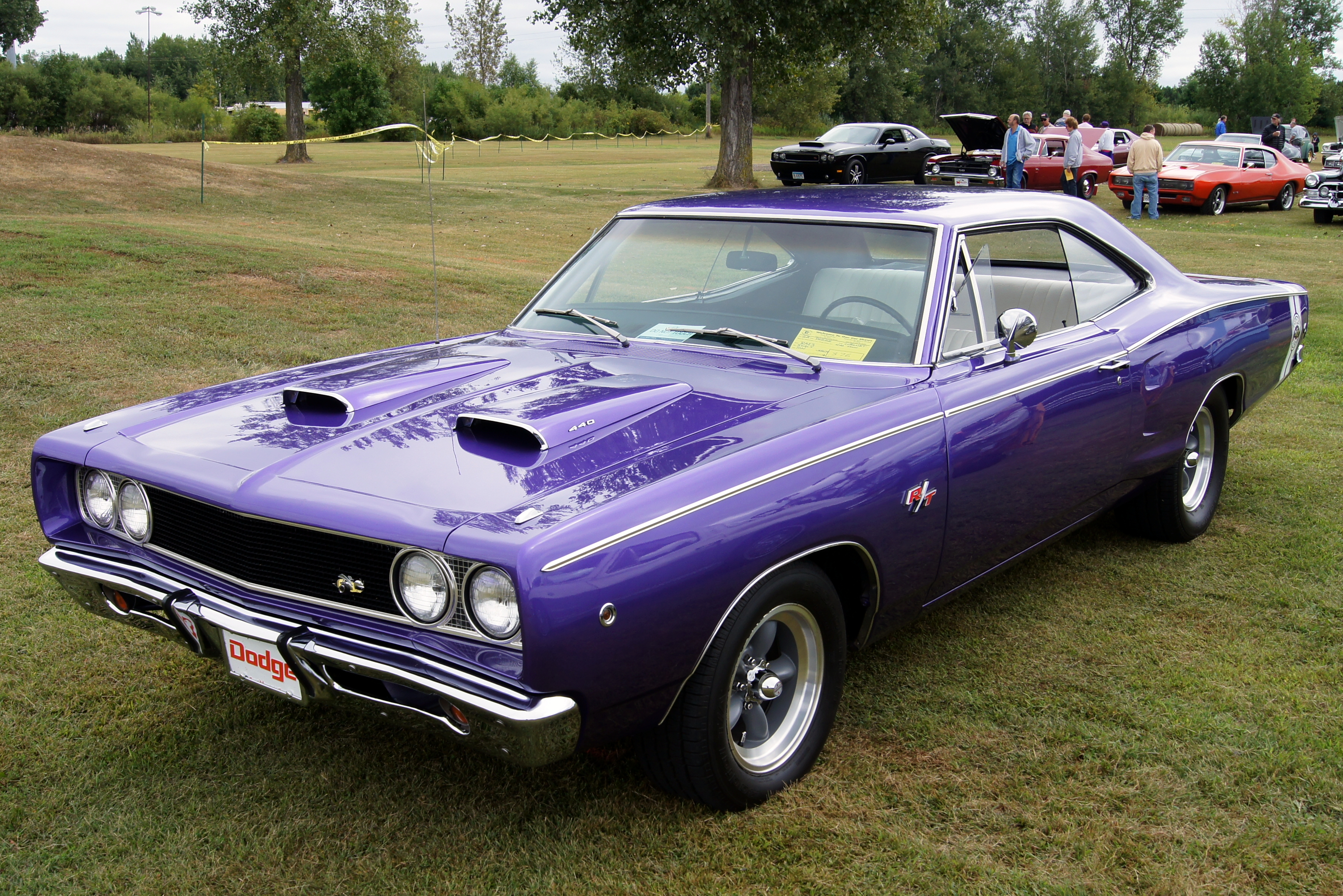
1968 Dodge Coronet R/T

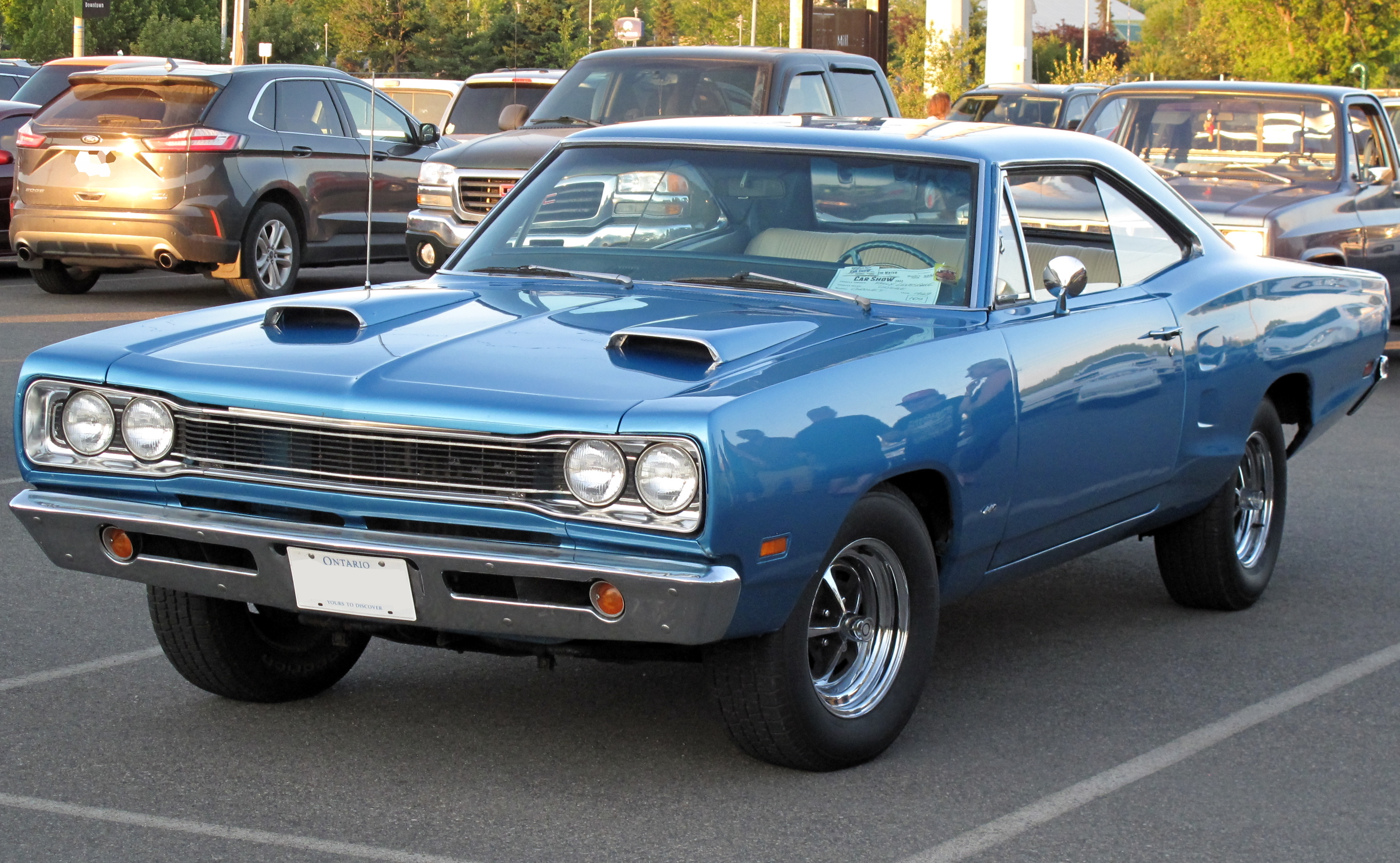
1969 Dodge Coronet R/T

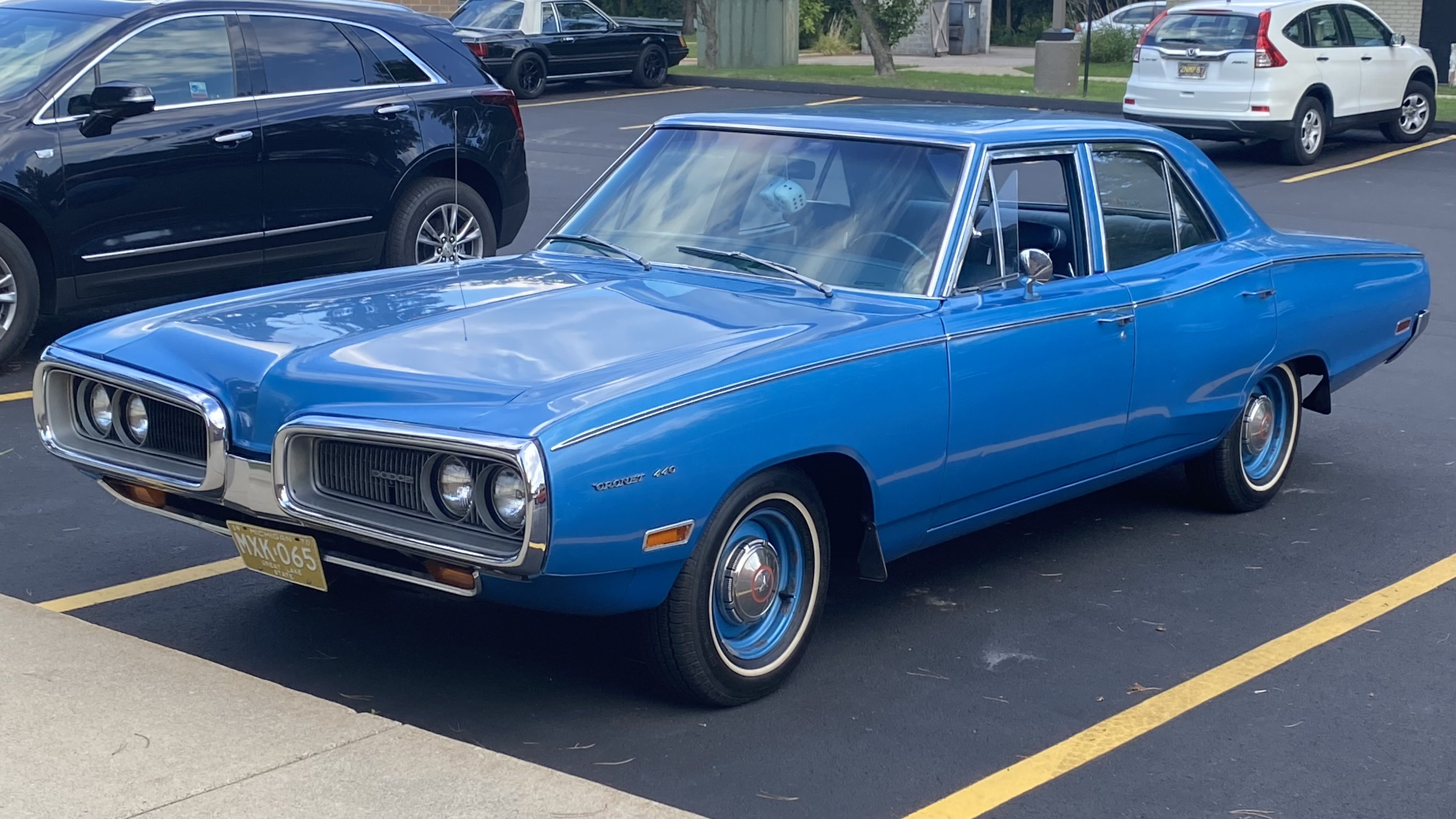
1970 Dodge Coronet 440 Sedan

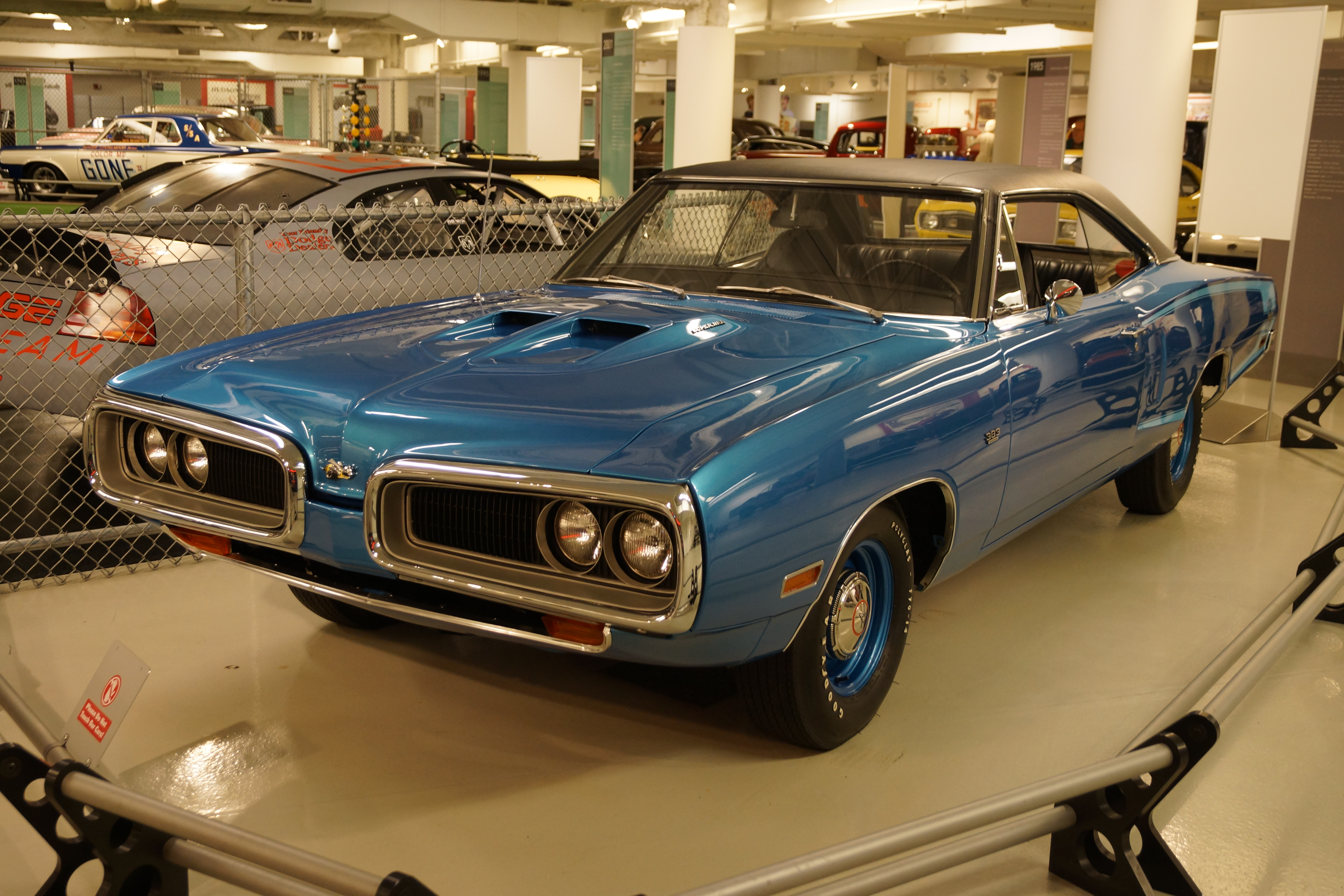
1970 Dodge Coronet Super Bee

== Sixth generation (1971–1974) ==
Sixth generation
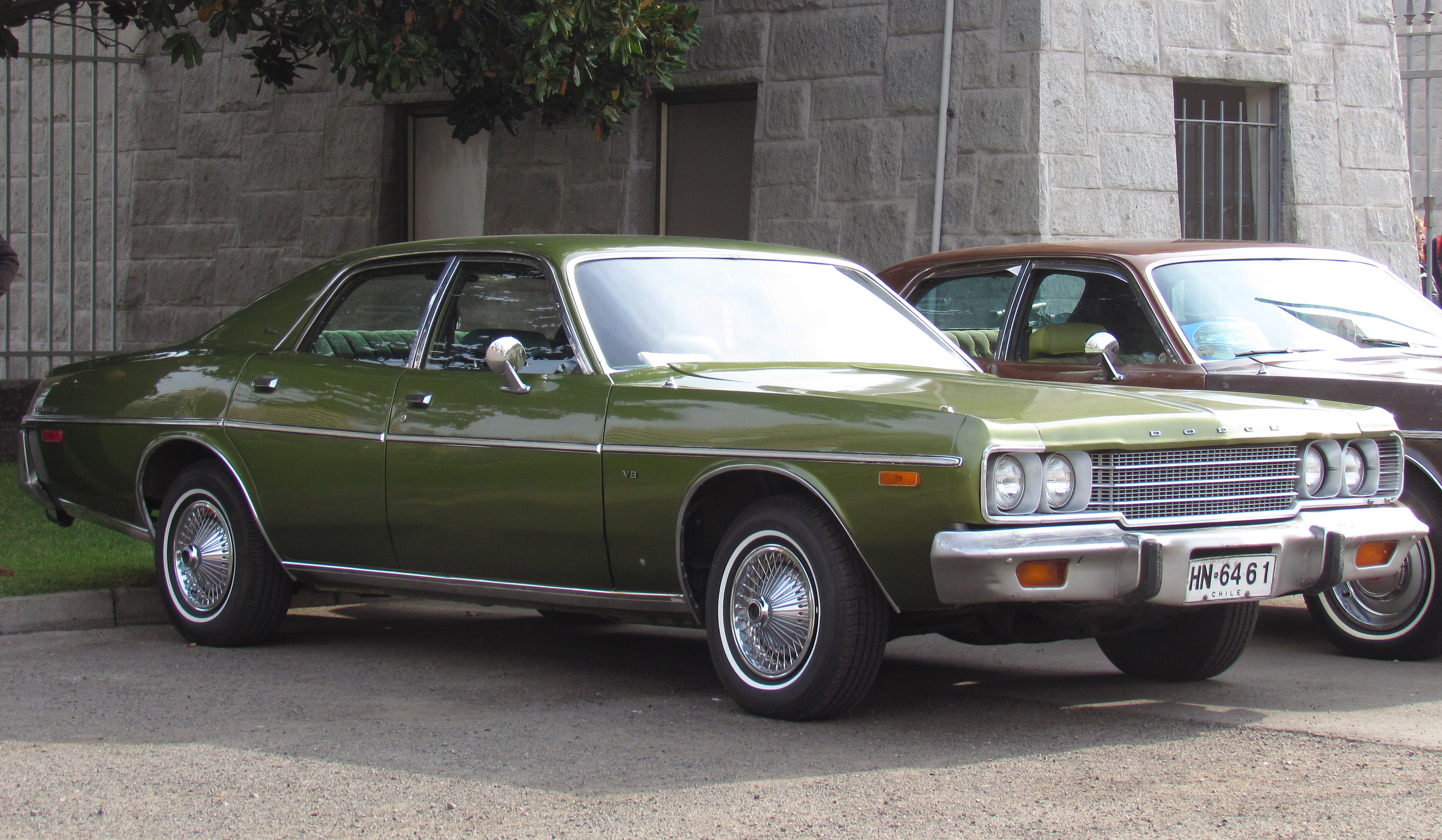
- 1974 Dodge Coronet Custom 4-Door Sedan

Overview
- Production: 1971–1974
- Assembly: United States: Hamtramck, Michigan (Dodge Main Factory)

Body and chassis
- Body style: 4-door wagon 4-door sedan
- Platform: B-body
- Related: Plymouth Satellite; Dodge Charger; Plymouth GTX; Plymouth Road Runner

Powertrain
- Engine: 225 cu in (3.7 L) Slant-6 I6; 318 cu in (5.2 L) 318 LA V8; 383 cu in (6.3 L) B "Magnum" V8; 400 cu in (6.6 L) B V8; 440 cu in (7.2 L) RB "Magnum" V8
- Transmission: 3-speed Chrysler A320 manual 3-speed TorqueFlite A727 automatic 4-speed Chrysler A833 manual

Dimensions
- Wheelbase: 118.0 in (2,997 mm)
- Length: Sedan: 207.0 in (5,258 mm); Wagon: 213.4 in (5,420 mm)
- Width: Sedan: 77.7 in (1,974 mm); Wagon: 78.8 in (2,002 mm)
- Height: Sedan: 53.7 in (1,364 mm); Wagon: 63.4 in (1,610 mm)

The new Coronet was a twin of the four-door Plymouth Satellite and featured more flowing styling. It was offered as a sedan and wagon, the related and also restyled Dodge Charger covering the coupe market. Slight alterations of the front grille, headlights, and taillights followed in 1972. Sales of the Coronet were low from this point onwards, with around 80–90,000 produced each year through 1973 (compared with 196,242 as recently as 1968), due both to the fuel crisis and to a proliferation of Dodge and Plymouth models, and the growing effect of overlap with the other Chrysler Corporation brands. In addition to the usual changes to the grille, lights, and interior, Dodge introduced in 1973 to mid-size models its "TorsionQuiet" system of additional silencers and rubber vibration insulators, providing a much smoother ride and a quieter interior.

The front and rear fascias were redesigned, most notably the rear bumper, which met the 1974 DOT requirements. The sedan body style would be the basis of the later Coronets (and its twin, the Plymouth Fury) until the 1978 model year.

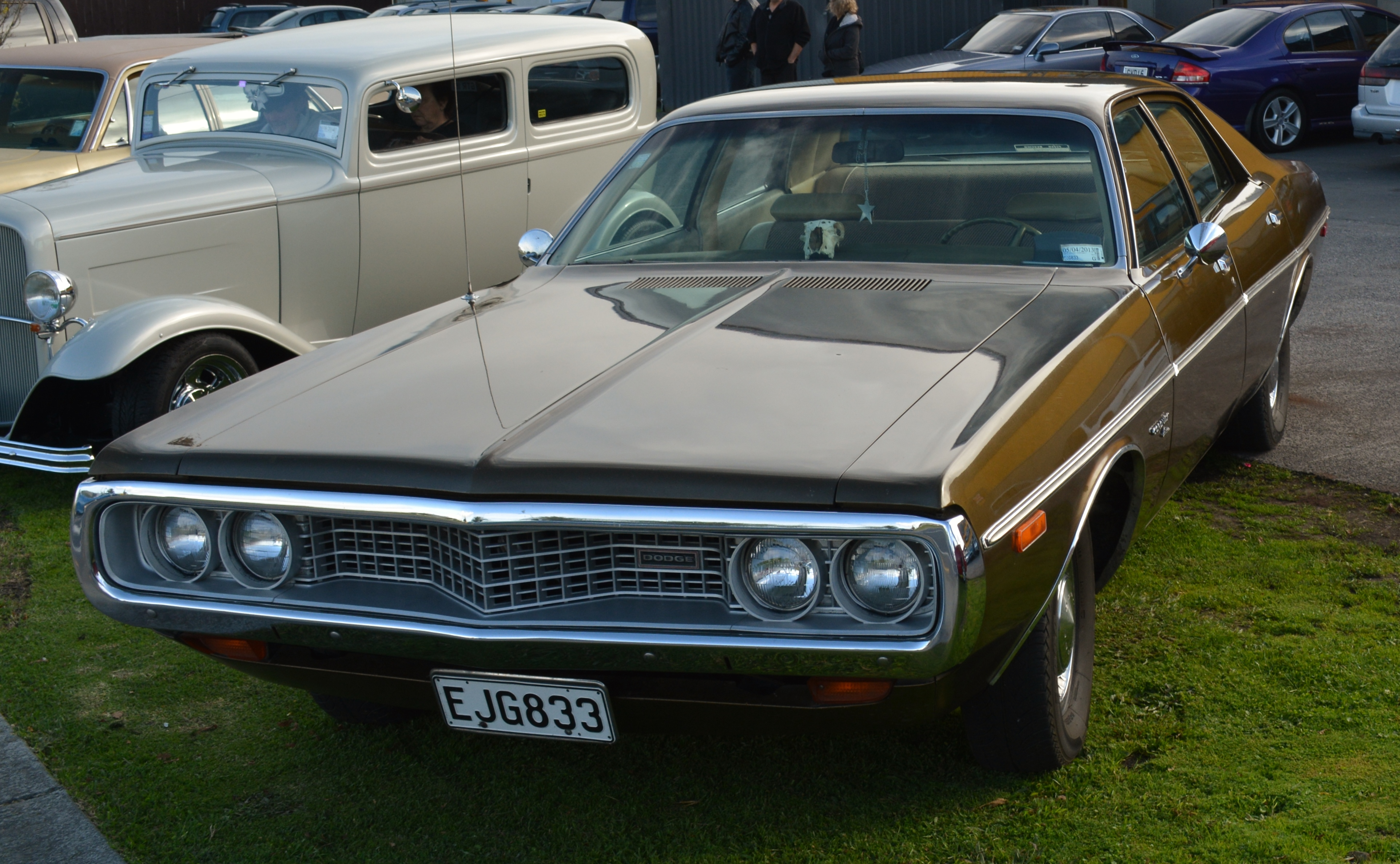
1972 Dodge Coronet Custom sedan

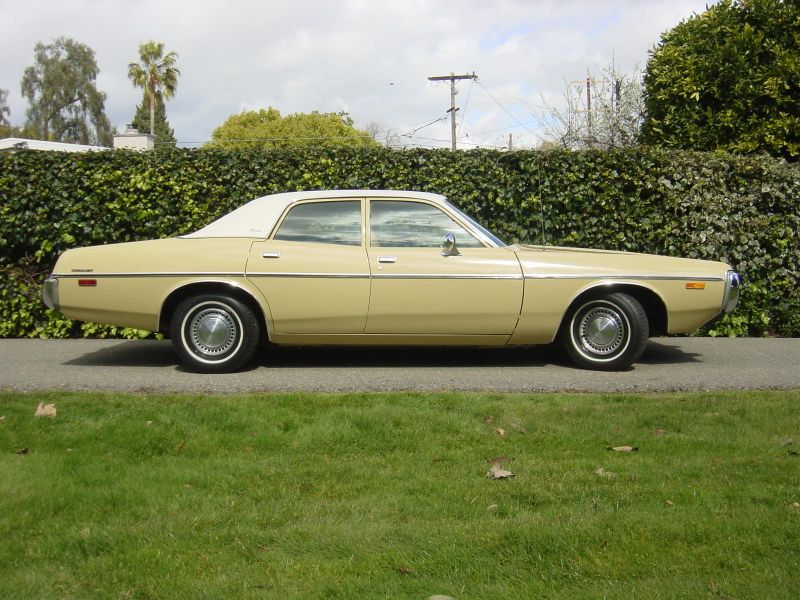
1973 Dodge Coronet Custom sedan

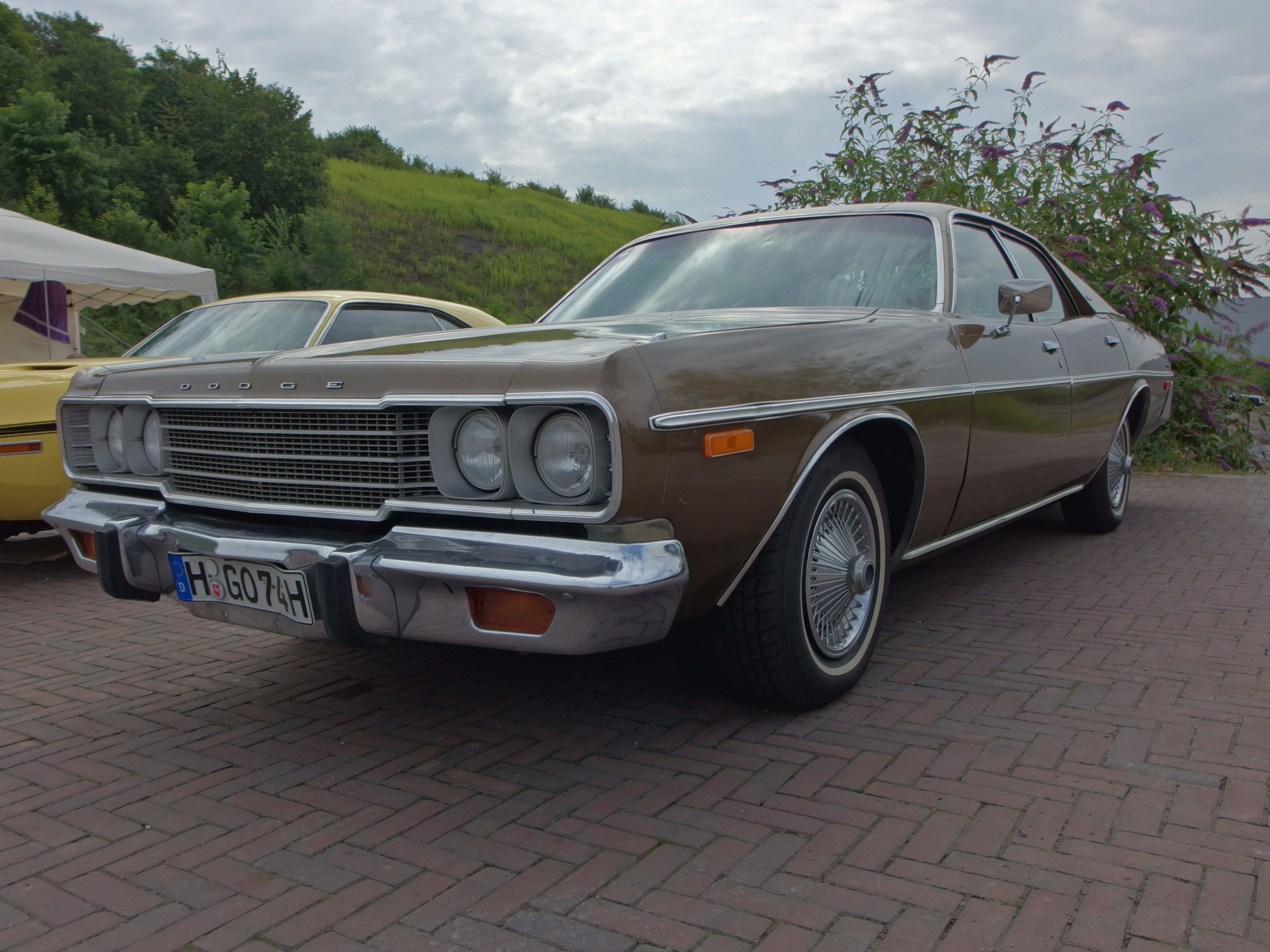
1974 Dodge Coronet Custom 4-Door Sedan

== Seventh generation (1975–1976) ==
Seventh generation
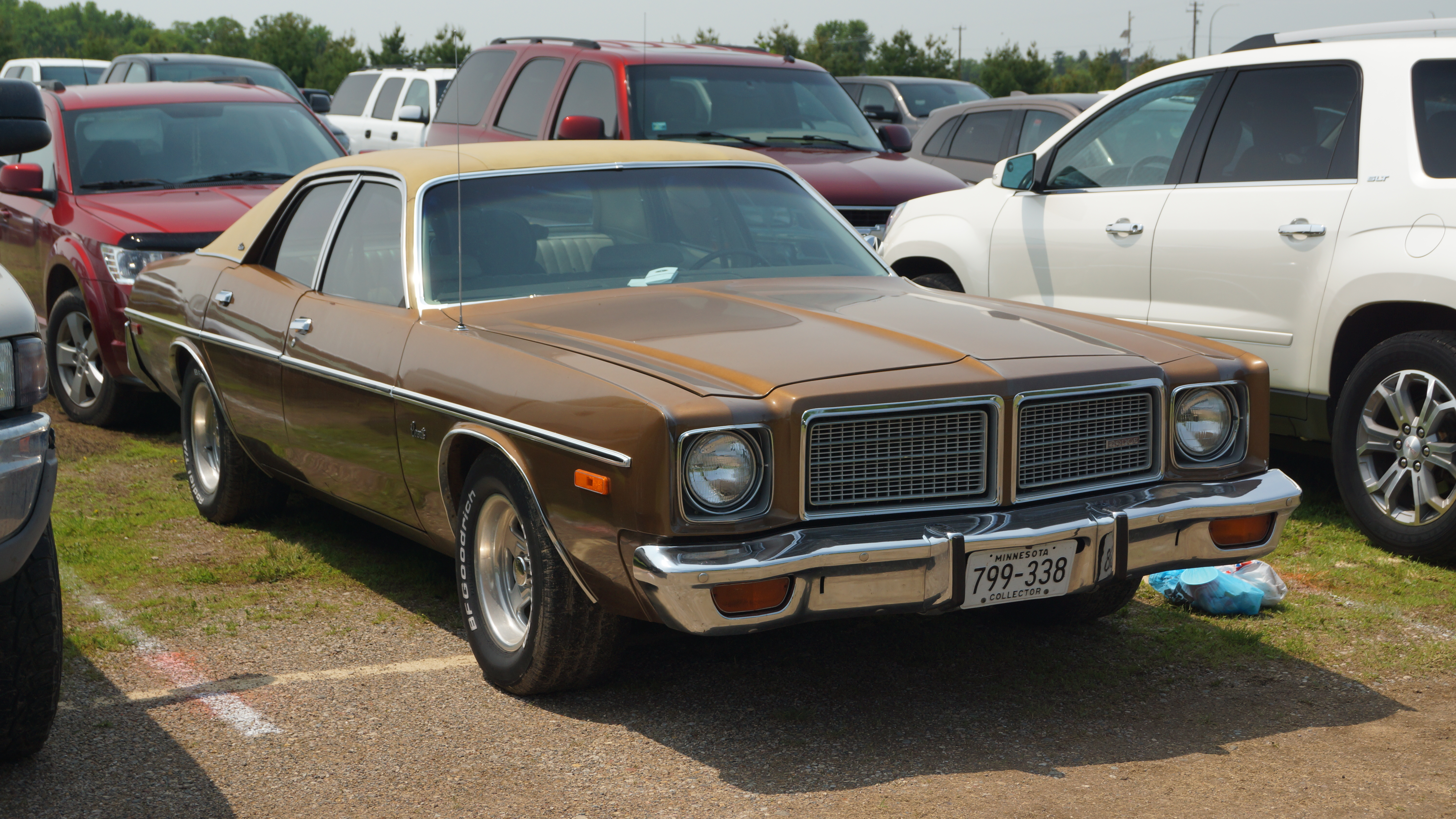
- 1975 Dodge Coronet Custom 4-Door Sedan (with aftermarket wheels)

Overview
- Production: 1975–1976
- Assembly: United States: Hamtramck, Michigan (Dodge Main Factory)

Body and chassis
- Body style: 4-door wagon (1975–1976); 4-door sedan (1975–1976); 2-door hardtop/coupe (1975 only)
- Platform: B-body
- Related: Plymouth Fury

Powertrain
- Engine: 225 cu in (3.7 L) Slant-6 I6; 318 cu in (5.2 L) LA V8; 360 cu in (5.9 L) LA V8; 400 cu in (6.6 L) B V8; 440 cu in (7.2 L) RB V8 (police)
- Transmission: 3-speed Chrysler A320 manual 3-speed TorqueFlite A727 automatic 4-speed Chrysler A833 manual

Dimensions
- Wheelbase: Sedan & Wagon: 118.0 in (2,997 mm); Coupe: 115.0 in (2,921 mm)
- Length: Sedan: 217.9 in (5,535 mm); Coupe: 213.8 in (5,431 mm); Wagon: 225.6 in (5,730 mm)
- Width: Sedan: 77.7 in (1,974 mm); Coupe: 77.4 in (1,966 mm); Wagon: 79.2 in (2,012 mm)
- Height: Sedan: 53.9 in (1,369 mm); Coupe: 52.6 in (1,336 mm); Wagon: 56.5 in (1,435 mm)

=== 1975 ===
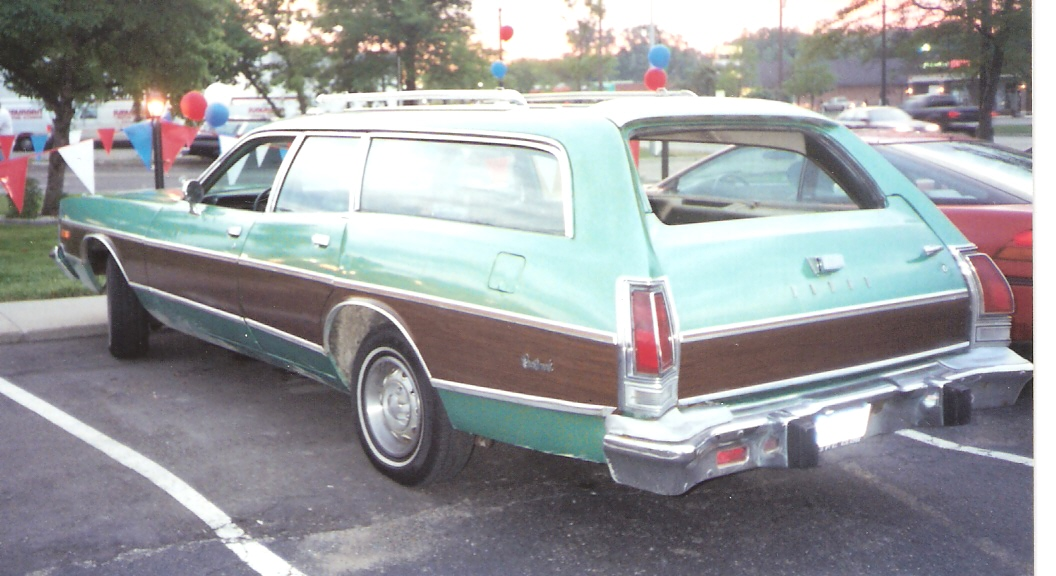
1975 Dodge Coronet Crestwood wagon

For 1975 the Coronet received a refreshed squarer-appearing body as well as a new front fascia with two round dual-beam headlights shared with its Plymouth Fury stablemate. After a four model year absence, a Dodge Coronet 2-door returned for 1975.

=== 1976 ===
1976 was the final model year for the Dodge Coronet and its body style choices were reduced to four-door wagon and four-door sedan. The former Dodge Coronet 2-door model was replaced by the Dodge Charger Sport for the 1976 model year.

For the 1977 model year, the mid-size Dodge Coronet was renamed Monaco, and the full-size Dodge Monaco was renamed Royal Monaco.

== Bibliography ==
- Gunnell, John, ed. (2004). The Standard Guide to 1950s American Cars. Krause Publications. ISBN 0-87349-868-2.
- "Dodge Coronet cars". Allpar.com.
- "Dodge Coronet History". Muscle Car Club.com.
- Godshall, Jeffrey I. (1980). "Wayward Wayfarer: The story of a Dodge". Automobile Quarterly. XVIII (1, first quarter 1980). Princeton, NJ: 72–81. ISSN 0005-1438.
- Guyette, James (January 2004). "LaFemme: a fancy and feminine statement of the chauvinist '50s". Aftermarket Business.
- Lindsey, Tony (February 1988). "1955–56 Dodge La Femme: "By Appointment to Her Majesty – the American Woman"". Collectible Automobile.
- Dodge La Femme Website and Registry
- "Dodge cars of 1955". Allpar.com.
- "D-500". Allpar.com.
- "Dodge Coronet History Part I". Musclecarclub.com. Archived from the original on July 20, 2006.
