= Dodge Matador =

Full-size car produced by Chrysler Corporation

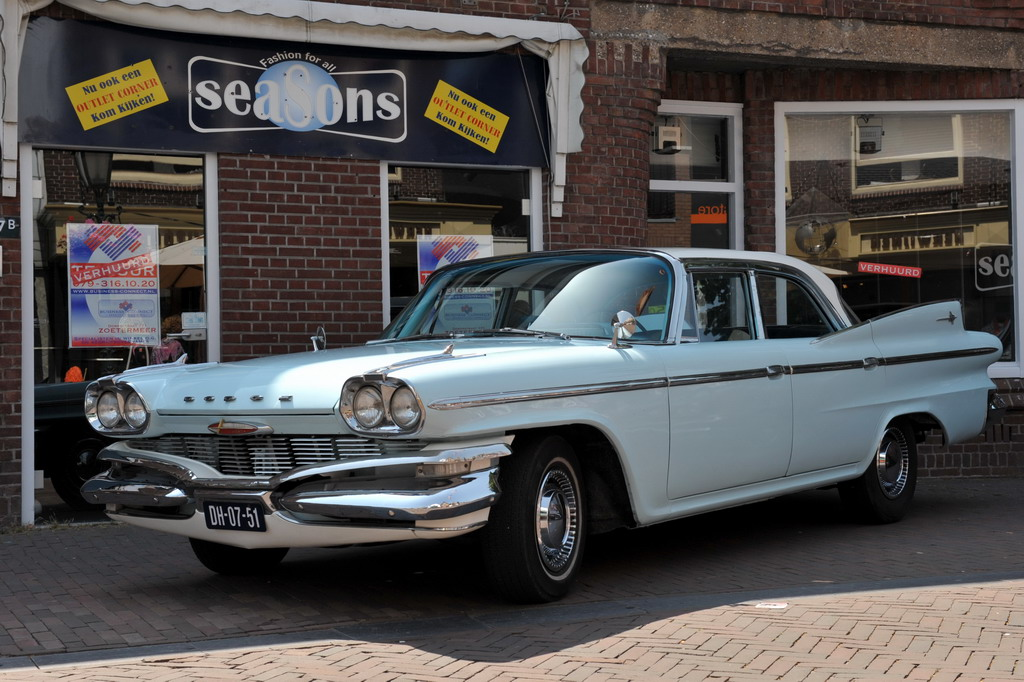
- 1960 Dodge Matador 4-door sedan

Overview
- Manufacturer: Dodge (Chrysler)
- Production: 1959–1960
- Model years: 1960
- Designer: Virgil Exner

Body and chassis
- Class: Full-size
- Body style: 2-door hardtop 4-door hardtop 4-door sedan 4-door wagon
- Layout: FR layout
- Related: Dodge Polara; Plymouth Belvedere

Powertrain
- Engine: 361 cu in (5.9 L) V8; 383 cu in (6.3 L) V8
- Transmission: 3-speed manual 2-speed PowerFlite automatic 3-speed TorqueFlite automatic

Dimensions
- Wheelbase: 122 in (3,099 mm)
- Length: 214 in (5,436 mm)
- Curb weight: 3,880 lb (1,760 kg) approx.

Chronology
- Predecessor: Dodge Coronet (Fourth generation)
- Successor: Dodge Polara

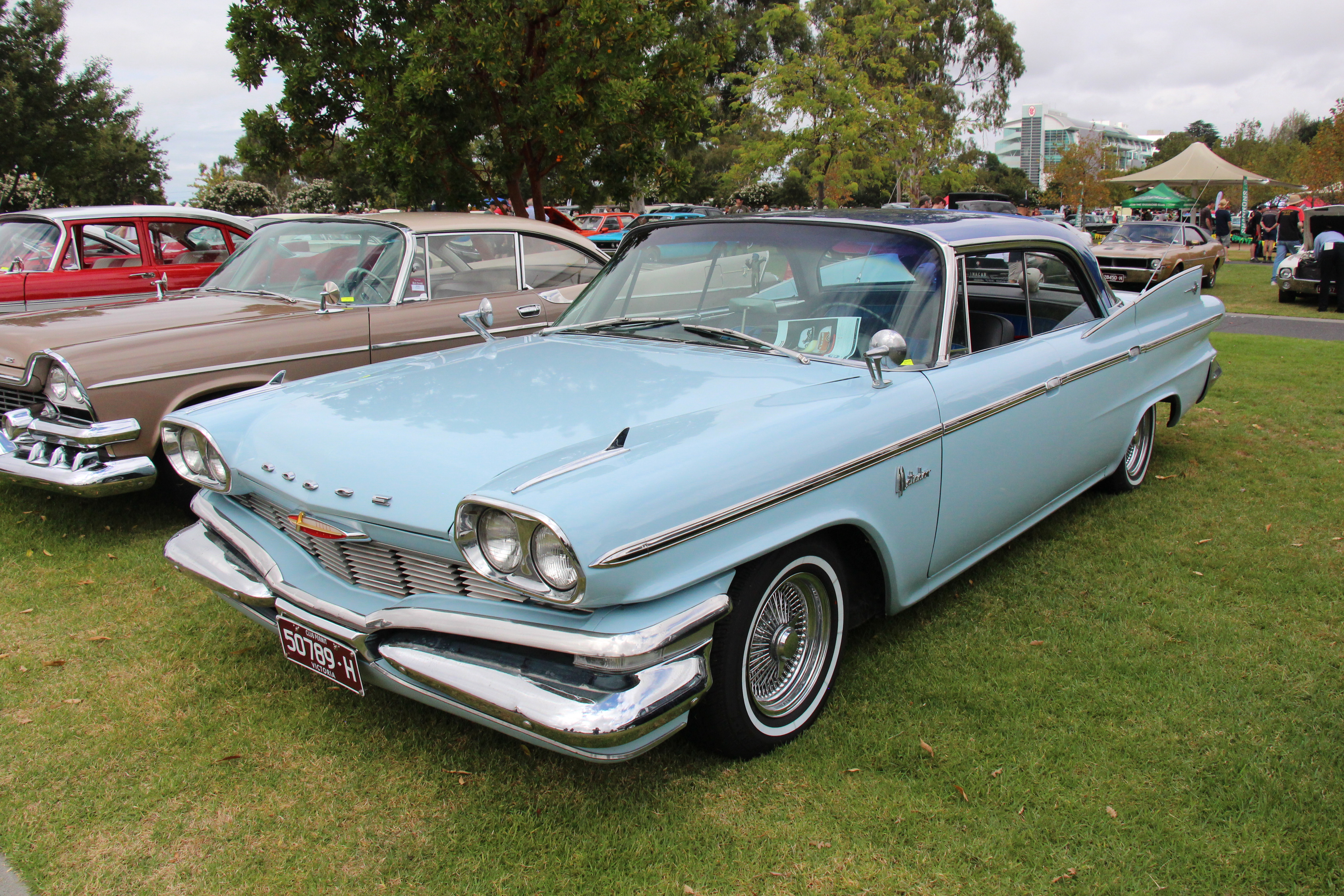
1960 Dodge Matador 4-door hardtop

1960 Dodge Matador station wagon

The Dodge Matador is a full-sized automobile produced for the 1960 model year by Dodge. The Matador was the base model, positioned below the top trim level Dodge Polara that also used the 122-inch (3,099 mm) wheelbase platform of the Chrysler Windsor and Chrysler Newport models.

== Design ==
The Matador was one of two new models produced by Dodge in 1960 when the marque dropped its long-running Coronet, Custom, Custom Royal, and Lancer models. Sharing the same newly engineered unibody platform as the slightly smaller Dodge Dart, the Matador was designated Dodge's full-size base trim vehicle, with the Dodge Polara becoming the make's full-sized premium model. The Matador line was positioned as a lower priced option to the Polara line to serve as the base-level, full-size car to above the newly introduced and successful 118-inch (2,997 mm) wheelbase Dart series. However, full-sized cars in the U.S. market were at their lowest sales level since the end of World War II, and 1959 was not the best time to launch a new nameplate into the full-size segment for the 1960 model year.

The 1960 Matador and Polara were built on a 4-inch (102 mm) longer wheelbase, along with the 1960 DeSoto and Chrysler models. All Matadors featured a standard "Super Red Ram" 295 hp (220 kW; 299 PS) 361 cu in (5.9 L) V8 engine. The "D-500 with Ram Induction" 383 cu in (6.3 L) with dual four-barrel carburetors was optional, along with a three-speed TorqueFlite automatic transmission. Similarly to other contemporary Chrysler automobiles, the automatic transmission was controlled by mechanical pushbuttons on the left side of the instrument panel.

The Matador (and the similar, better-trimmed Polara) featured styling cues that were carried over from 1959 models, themselves an evolution of Virgil Exner's "Forward Look" cars introduced in 1957. Exner was responsible for some of the most memorable vehicles during the tailfin era. The 1960 Dodge version has been described as a "rocket age design." Now built on a new unibody chassis, the 1960 Matador continued the Dodge styling hallmarks of stacked "jet pod" taillights; however, the size of the lights was greatly exaggerated, with the lower light set into the rear bumper. The design also incorporated Dodge's shortened tailfins, with small vertical taillight lenses mounted on the vertical surface at the back of each fin. The shortened fin was meant to exaggerate the length of the "jet pods" holding the taillights. The front end featured a small grille comprising six stacks of aluminum rectangles nested in a massive, complex front bumper assembly.

The interior featured cloth and vinyl bench seats with premium trim and an "X-within-an-X four-spoke steering wheel." The dashboard was "space-age-styled," featuring a bridged-over sweep-style speedometer on top flanked by gauge pods and an optional "revolving turret clock" centered on the instrument panel. The "satellite-styled" clock featured a stationary pointer with the hour numerals on the top revolving dial, minutes on the lower dial, and the seconds by an orbiting red dot. Other options included vacuum door locks on four-door models and new front swivel seats with a folding center armrest. The seat automatically rotated out upon opening the door and returned to position when closing the door.

All 1960 Dodge station wagons used the 122 in (3,099 mm) wheelbase, providing 98.5 cubic feet (2.79 m^{3}) of cargo space with the back seats folded flat. The Matador trim was available in six- or nine-passenger (with a rear-facing third-row bench seat) versions, both featuring a roll-down rear window into the tailgate.

The Matador had less exterior chrome trim and plainer interiors than the Polara. The majority of cars built by Dodge and sold during the 1960 model year were the new "smaller" and less expensive full-size model, the Dodge Dart, which fielded three sub-series (Seneca, Pioneer, and Phoenix) of its own.

A total of 27,908 Dodge Matadors were produced for the 1960 model year. The low sales of the Matador, the continuing popularity of the Dart models, and the launch of the new 1961 compact-sized Lancer meant the Matador nameplate was dropped for the 1961 model year, leaving only the Polara as the full-size Dodge.

== Legacy ==
The Matador nameplate was later used by AMC from 1971 until 1978 for its mid- and full-sized AMC Matador cars. Coincidentally, Chrysler went on to purchase American Motors Corporation (AMC) in 1987.
