= Plymouth Belvedere =

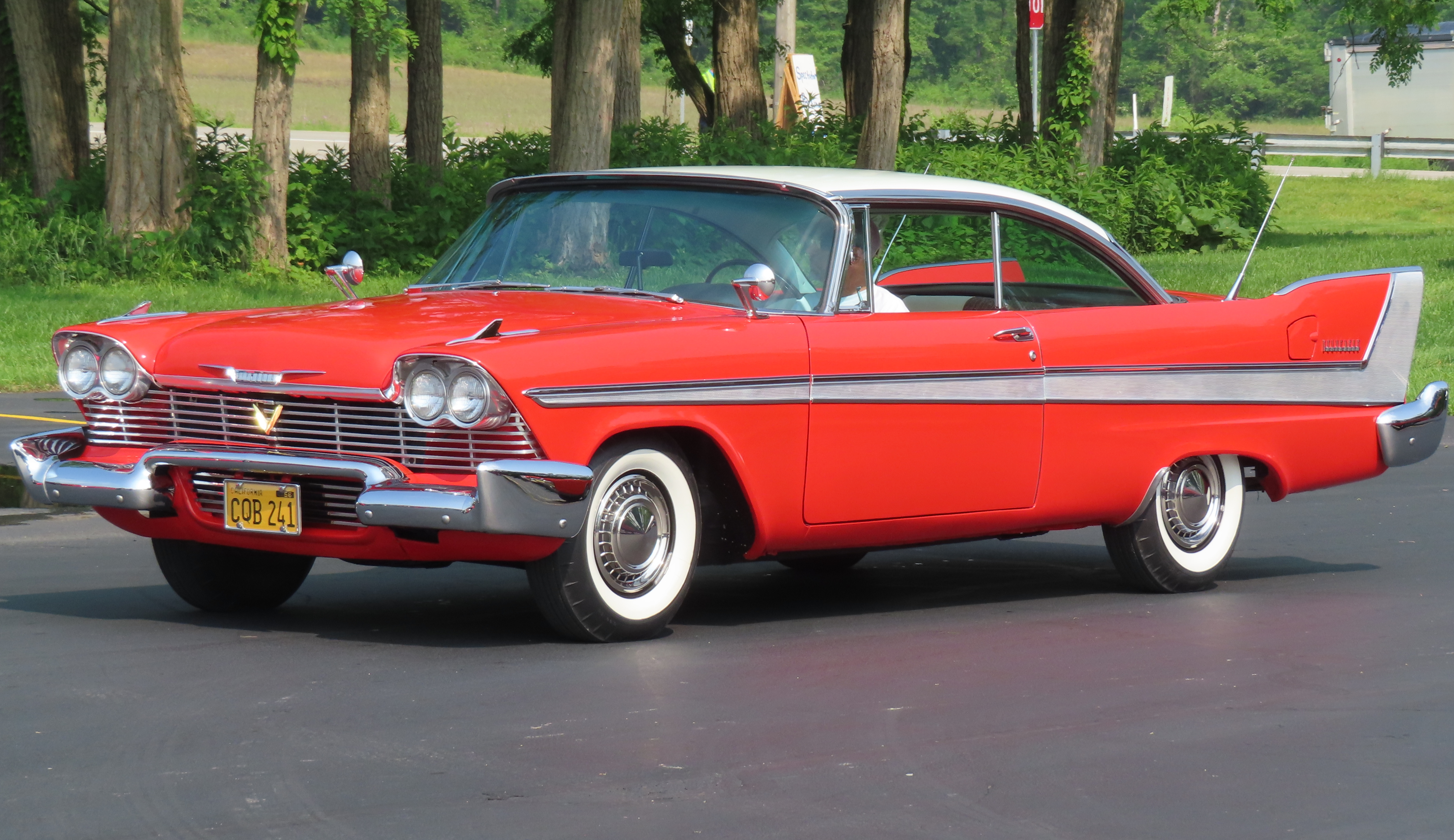
- 1958 Plymouth Belvedere 2-door hardtop

Overview
- Manufacturer: Plymouth (Chrysler)
- Production: 1954–1970

Body and chassis
- Class: Full-size (1954–1961); Mid-size (1962–1970)
- Layout: FR layout

Chronology
- Predecessor: Plymouth Cranbrook
- Successor: Plymouth Satellite

The Plymouth Belvedere is a series of American automobile models made by Plymouth from 1954 until 1970.

The Belvedere name was first used for a new hardtop body style in the Plymouth Cranbrook line for the 1951 model year. In 1954, the Belvedere replaced the Cranbrook as the top trim and became a full model line with sedans, station wagons, and convertible body styles. The Belvedere continued as Plymouth's full-sized car until 1965 when it became an intermediate. It was replaced after the 1970 model year by the Satellite, a name originally used for the top-trim level Belvederes.

The word belvedere is Italian for "beautiful sight" or "fair view." Chrysler also had the Belvidere Assembly Plant in Belvidere, Illinois, which began vehicle production in 1965. However, the Plymouth Belvedere was never assembled there.

During the 1950s and 1960s Chrysler Canada built the Belvedere for Commonwealth export markets such as New Zealand, India, and South Africa, in either CKD form or in factory right-hand-drive. Australia's local Chrysler operation built its own variation of the model until 1960.

== Cranbrook Belvedere (1951–1953) ==
Plymouth Cranbrook Belvedere
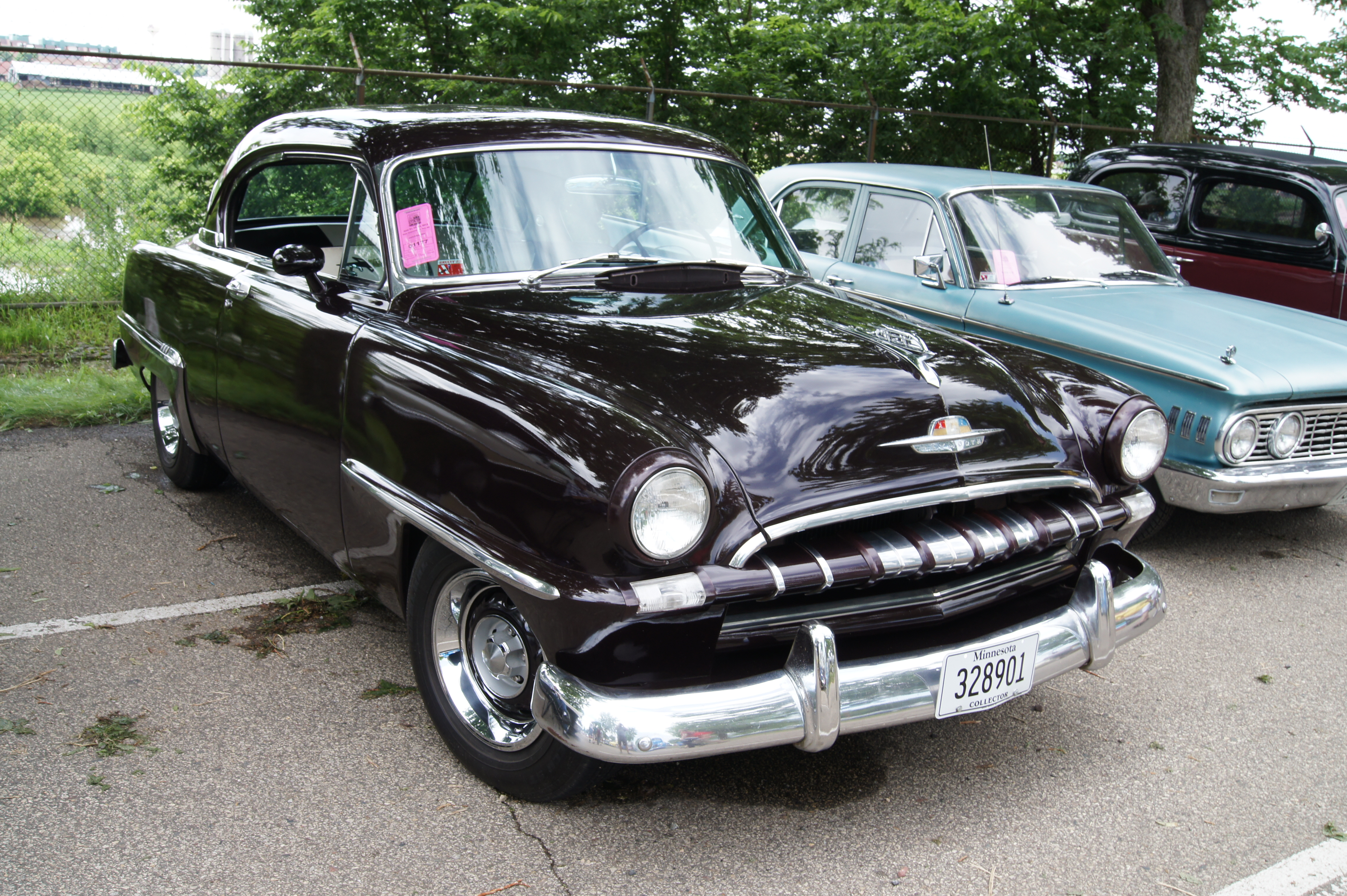

Overview
- Also called: Dodge Regent (Canada)
- Model years: 1951–1953
- Assembly: Lynch Road Assembly, Highland Park, Michigan; Los Angeles Assembly, Maywood, California; San Leandro Assembly, San Leandro, California

Body and chassis
- Class: Full-size car
- Body style: 2-door hardtop
- Related: DeSoto Custom; Dodge Custom

Powertrain
- Engine: 218 cu in (3.6 L) Chrysler Flathead I6

Dimensions
- Wheelbase: 114.0 in (2,896 mm)

The Plymouth Cranbrook Belvedere was introduced as a two-door pillarless hardtop on March 31, 1951. It was Plymouth's first such body design. The model was developed in response to the 1950 Chevrolet Bel Air and the Ford Victoria, the first two-door hardtop in the low-priced American market.

The Cranbrook Belvedere was the name for the two-door hardtop version of the Cranbrook and was built on the same 118.5 in (3,010 mm) wheelbase. Powering the Belvedere is the Chrysler flathead 217.8 cu in (3.6 L) straight-6 engine with a 7.00:1 compression ratio producing 97 hp (72 kW; 98 PS) (SAE gross).

For 1952, Plymouth kept the Cranbrook Belvedere essentially unchanged. The most significant upgrade was to the color scheme; to further distinguish the top-level Belvedere from other Plymouths, the two tones now flowed from the roof over the beltline onto the trunk, referred to as the "saddleback" treatment. Two-tone color schemes were "sable bronze" over suede, black over "mint green", and gray over blue. Overdrive was made available as optional equipment in the 1952 Plymouth. In overdrive, the engine made three revolutions for each rear wheel revolution and four without overdrive. The engine was a complete carryover from 1951. Production for 1951 and 1952 totaled 51,266 units.

The Belvedere remained a part of the Cranbrook series through the 1953 model year, which saw all Plymouth models completely restyled. Significant changes include a shorter 114 in (2,900 mm) wheelbase, a one-piece windshield, flush rear fenders, and a lower hood line. In April 1953, Plymouths received the Hy-Drive semi-automatic transmission. The engine was carried over from 1952, with the only enhancement being a slight increase in the compression ratio to 7.10:1, which yielded a rating of 100 hp (75 kW). A total of 35,185 Belvederes were sold in 1953.

== Full-size series ==
=== 1954 ===
First generation
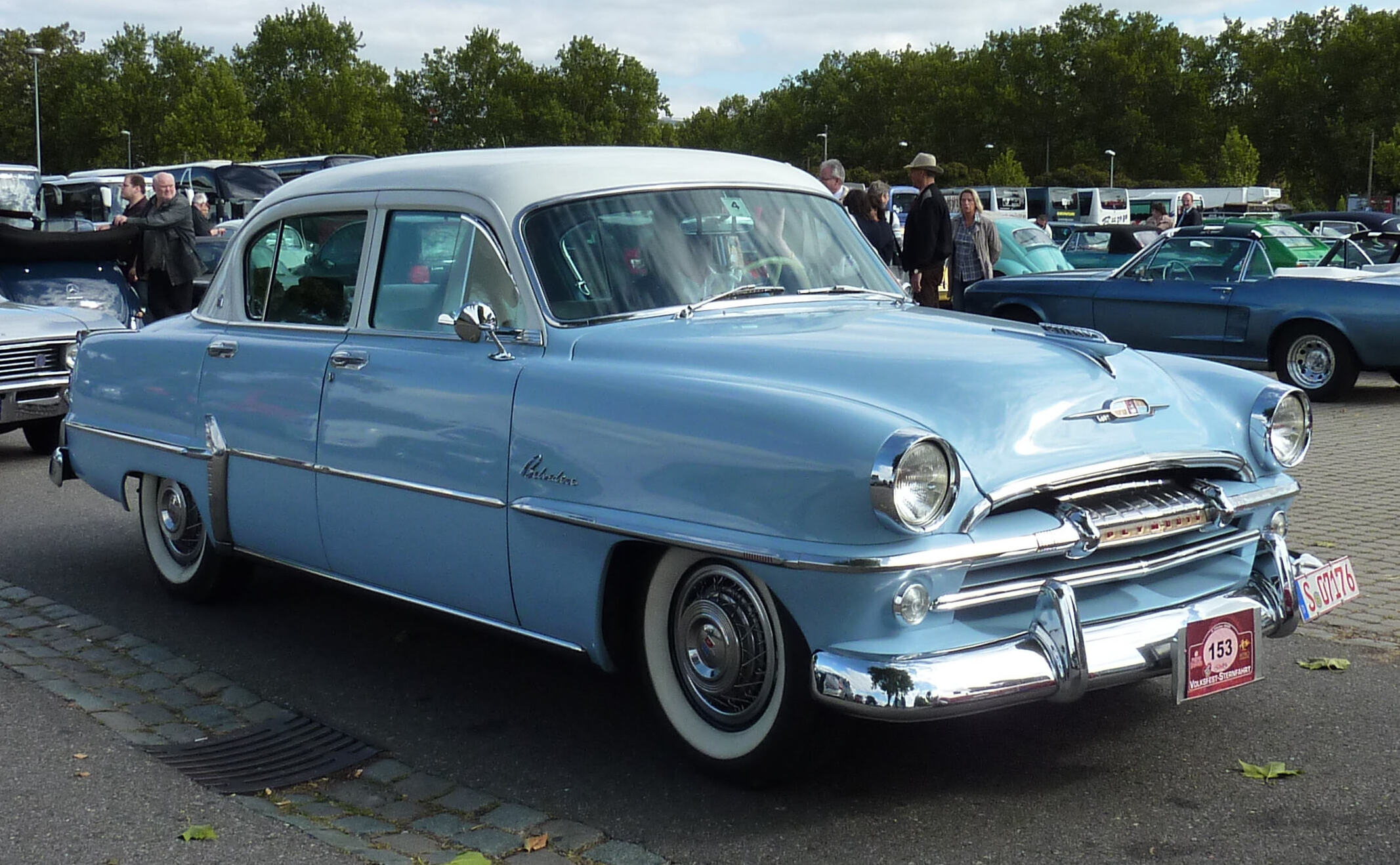
- 1954 Plymouth Belvedere four-door sedan

Overview
- Model years: 1954
- Assembly: Lynch Road Assembly, Highland Park, Michigan; Los Angeles Assembly, Maywood, California; San Leandro Assembly, San Leandro, California

Body and chassis
- Class: Full-size car
- Body style: 4-door sedan 2-door hardtop 2-door convertible 2-door station wagon
- Related: DeSoto Firedome; Dodge Meadowbrook

Powertrain
- Engine: 230 cu in (3.8 L) Chrysler Flathead I6

Dimensions
- Wheelbase: 114.0 in (2,896 mm)

The Belvedere replaced the Cranbrook as the top-line offering for 1954. Now, a separate model instead of just a two-door hardtop, the Belvedere was also available as a convertible, two-door station wagon, and four-door sedan. The two-door hardtop version was now called the "Sport Coupe." The 1954 Belvederes featured full-length rocker sill moldings.

Minor styling updates adorned the carry-over body design. For the first time, small chrome tailfins appeared on the rear fenders. An entry-level nameplate, the Plymouth Plaza, was introduced sharing the same design and technology at a lower price.

In March 1954, Plymouth finally offered a fully automatic transmission, the Chrysler PowerFlite two-speed. Also new was a larger standard engine: a 230.2 cu in (3.8 L) I6 that was also used by the Dodge Division. Power was now rated at 110 hp (82 kW).

Belvedere production totaled 32,492 for the year.

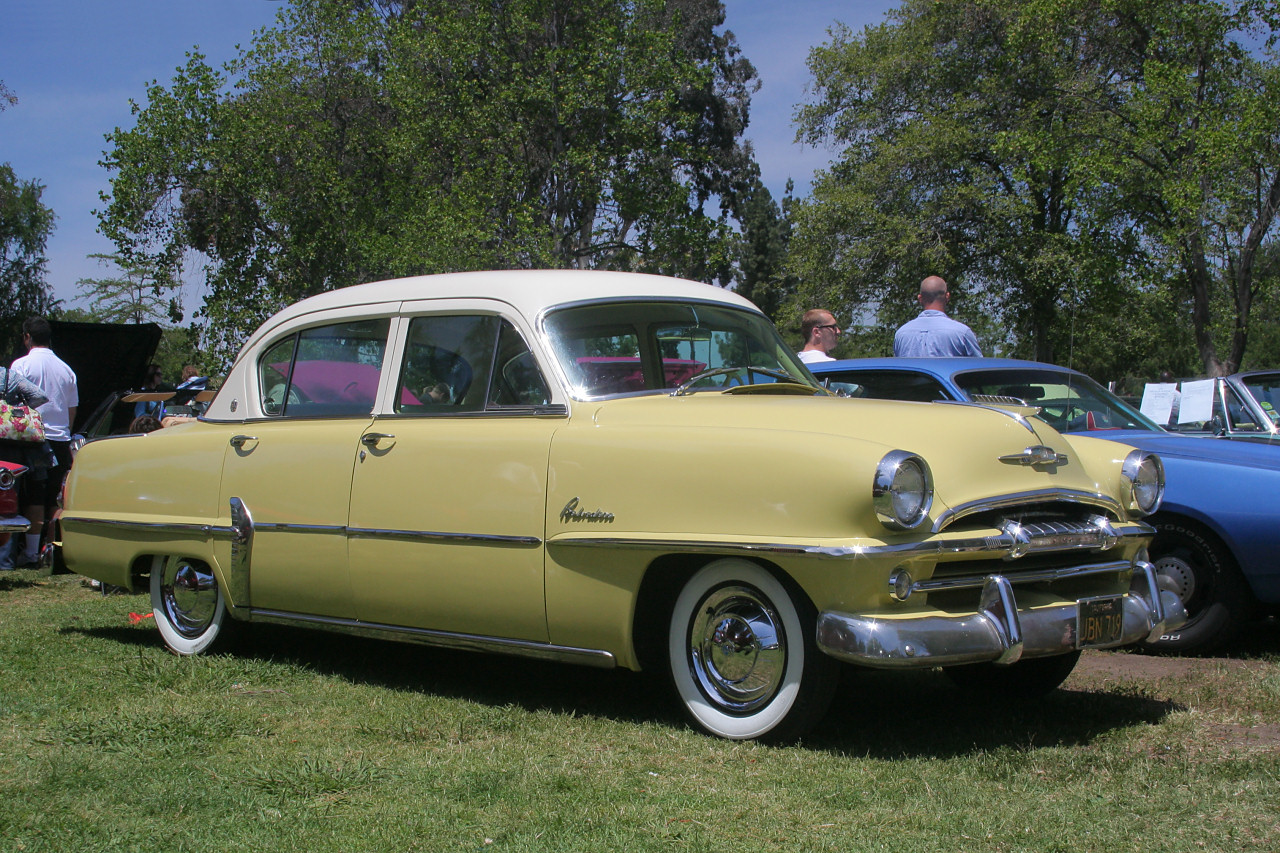
1954 Plymouth Belvedere four-door sedan

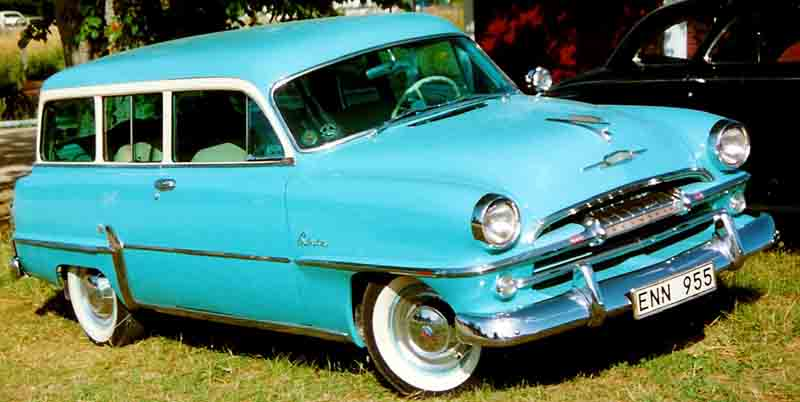
1954 Plymouth Belvedere Suburban

=== 1955–1956 ===
Second generation
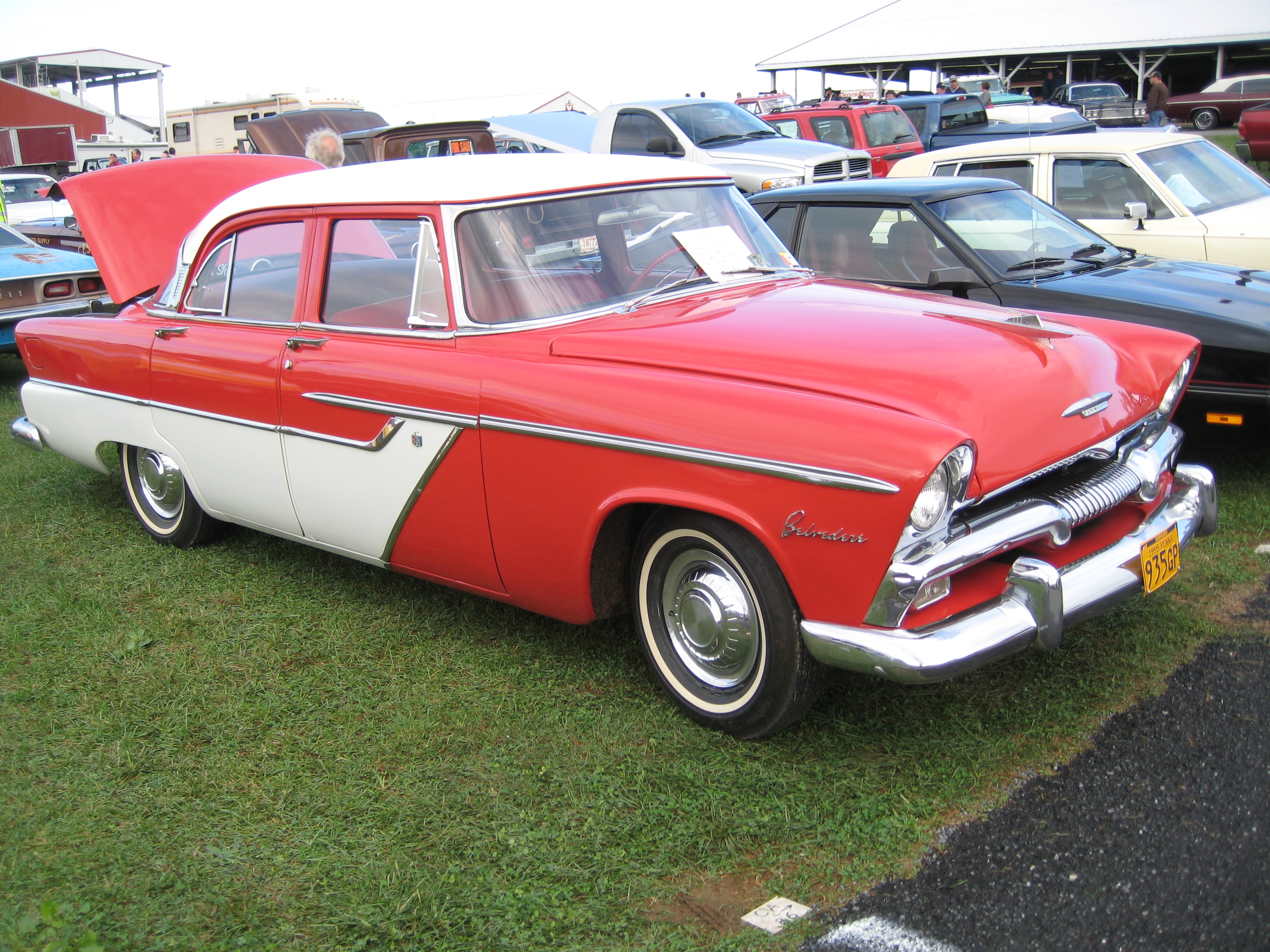
- 1955 Plymouth Belvedere 4-door sedan

Overview
- Also called: Dodge Mayfair (Canada)
- Model years: 1955–1956
- Assembly: Lynch Road Assembly, Highland Park, Michigan; Los Angeles Assembly, Maywood, California

Body and chassis
- Body style: 2-door sedan 4-door sedan 2-door hardtop 4-door hardtop 2-door convertible 4-door station wagon
- Related: DeSoto Powermaster; Dodge Coronet

Powertrain
- Engine: 230 cu in (3.8 L) Chrysler Flathead I6; 241 cu in (3.9 L) V8; 260 cu in (4.3 L) V8; 277 cu in (4.5 L) V8; 303 cu in (5.0 L) V8
- Transmission: 2-speed automatic

Dimensions
- Wheelbase: 115.0 in (2,921 mm)

All Plymouths underwent a major overhaul for the 1955 model year. This was the first year of Chrysler stylist Virgil Exner's "Forward Look." The Belvedere returned as top-of-the-line, and the Plaza remained the entry-level model. Chrysler promoted the all-new appearance, showing cars built at the Lynch Road Factory in a featurette movie Here. Midway through the model year (on February 26), the engine's stroke was increased by a quarter inch, increasing displacement from 217.8 to 230.2 cu in (3.6 to 3.8 L) and increasing power from 100 to 110 hp (75 to 82 kW).

For 1956, Plymouth styling evolved from that of the 1955s. Most notable was the introduction of the first push-button automatic transmission to appear in an American automobile, and a more dramatic rear-end treatment highlighted by a pair of rakish tail-fins. In early 1956, the Fury joined the Belvedere line as a special-edition high-performance coupe. Belvedere remained the top full-line series through 1958. In 1956, Plymouth added seat belts.

In 1956, Chrysler's chief engineer George Huebner in a public-relations campaign took a Belvedere and had a Chrysler turbine engine fitted instead of the standard gasoline engine, and was driven across the U.S.

The 1956 models came with more V8 power upgrades: options were the 180 bhp 270 cu in (4.4 L) V8, 187 bhp 277 cu in (4.5 L) V8, 200 bhp 277 cid V8, and for the Fury, a 240 bhp 303 cu in (5.0 L) V8. Tail fins featured for the first time, in what Exner described as the "Forward Look."

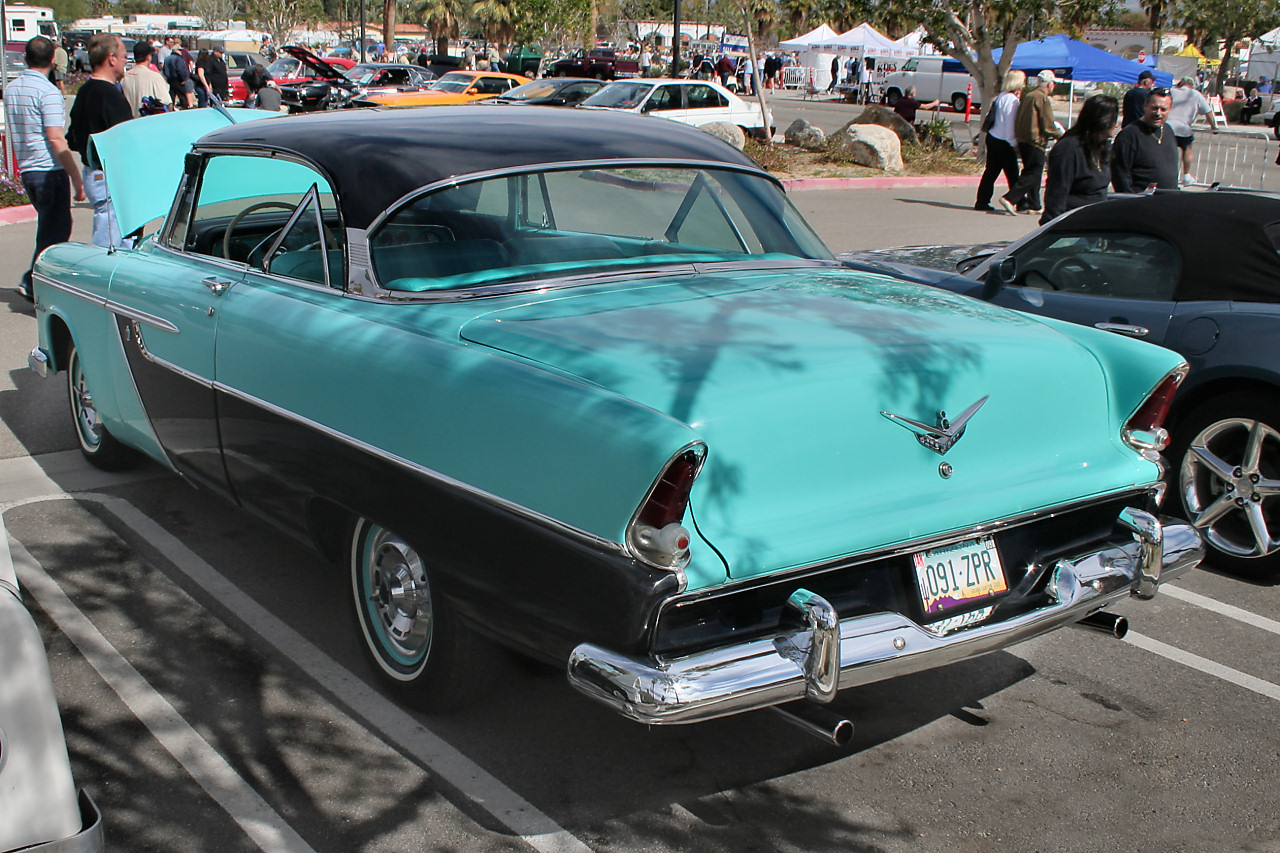
1955 Plymouth Belvedere Sport Coupe

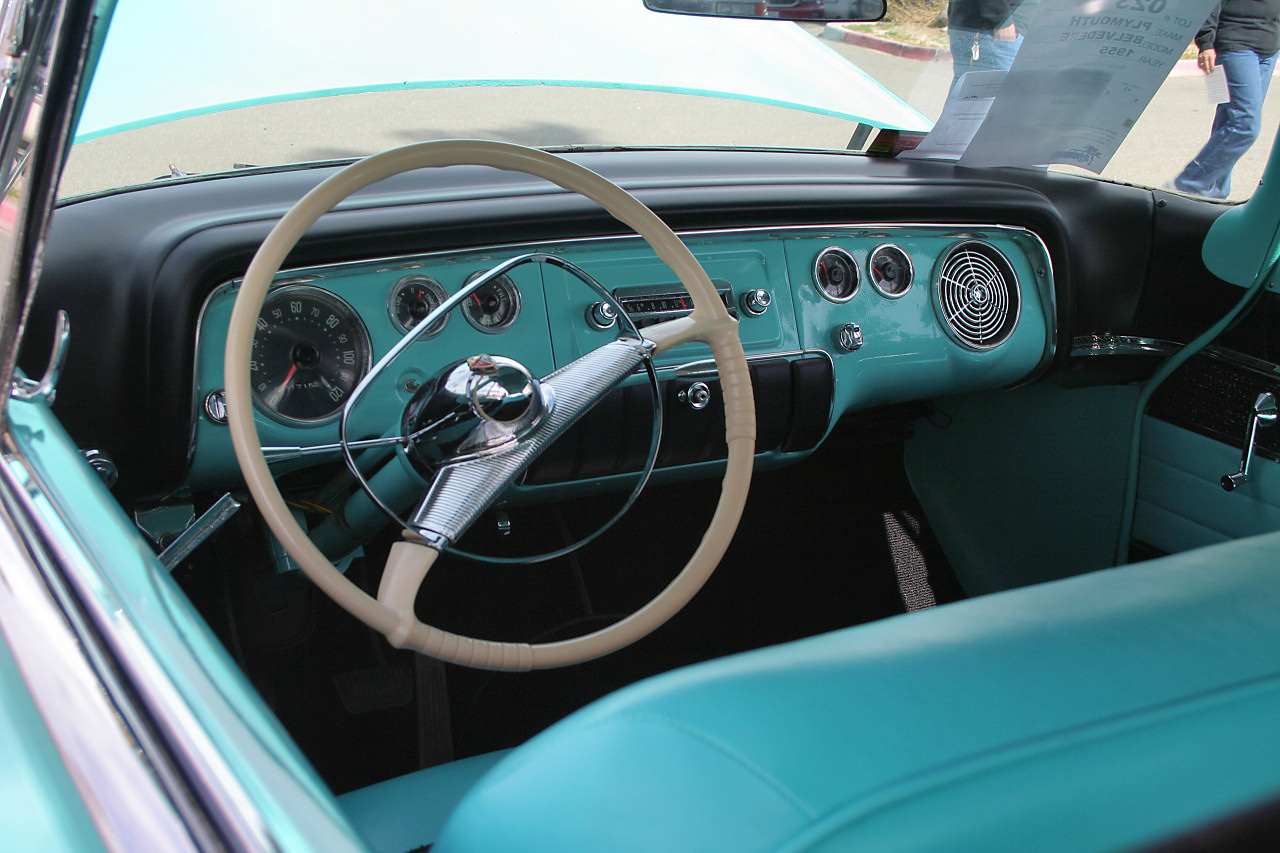
1955 Plymouth Belvedere Sport Coupe interior

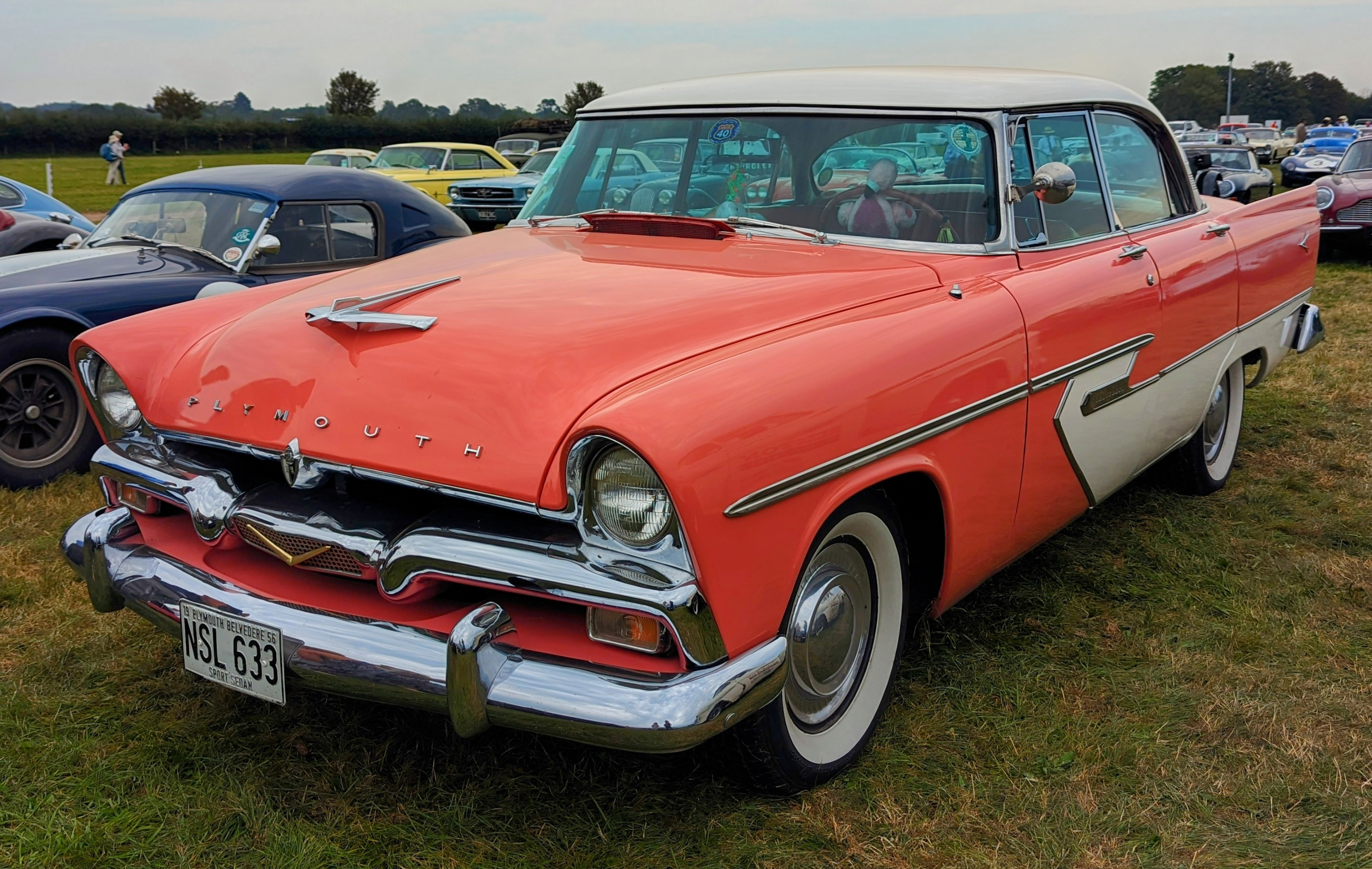
1956 Plymouth Belvedere 4-door hardtop

=== 1957–1959 ===
Third generation
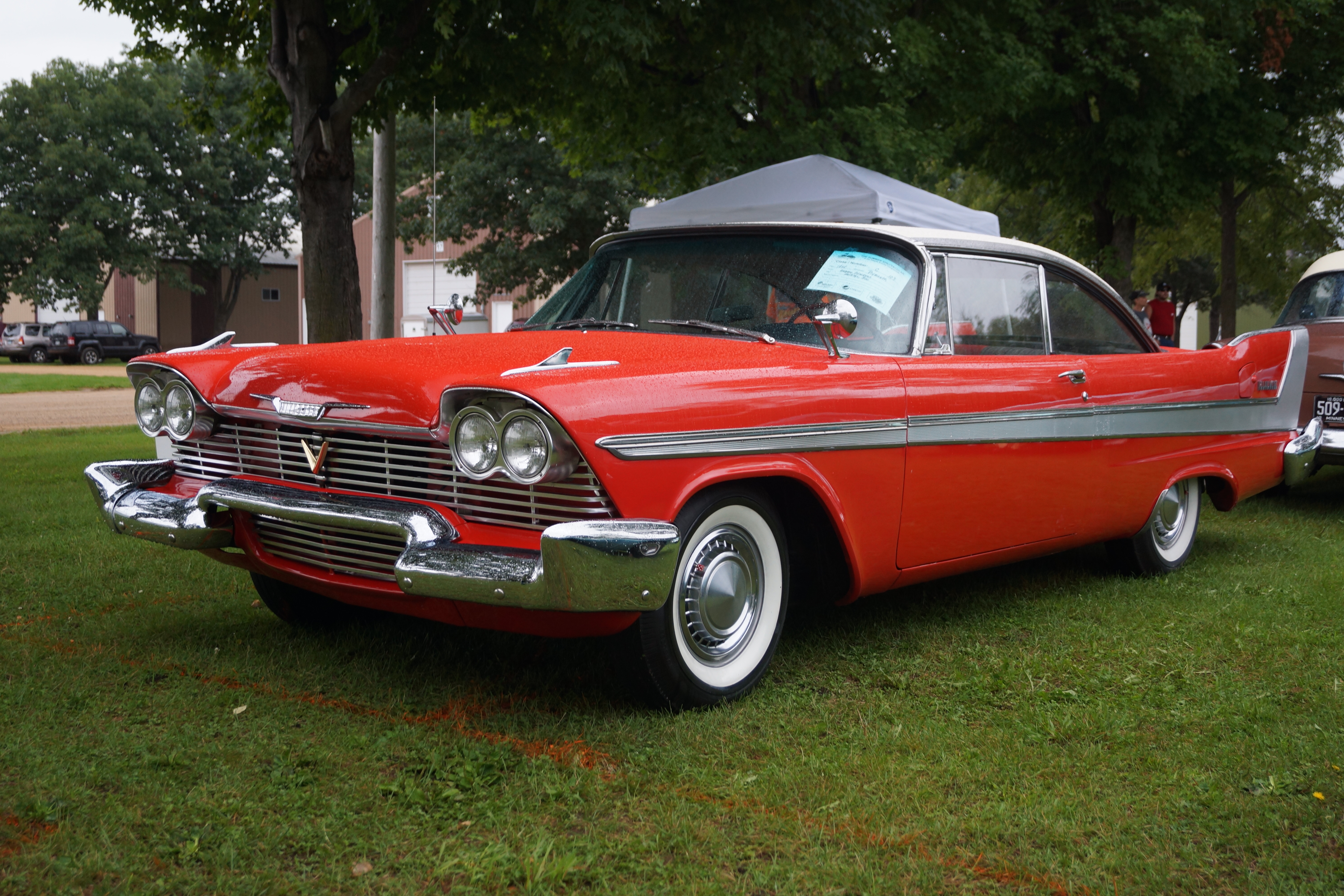
- 1958 Plymouth Belvedere 2-door Hardtop

Overview
- Model years: 1957–1959
- Assembly: Newark Assembly, Newark, Delaware; Lynch Road Assembly, Detroit, Michigan

Body and chassis
- Body style: 2-door sedan 4-door sedan 2-door hardtop 4-door hardtop 2-door convertible 2-door station wagon 4-door station wagon
- Related: DeSoto Firedome; Dodge Coronet

Powertrain
- Engine: 230.2 cu in (3.8 L) Chrysler Flathead I6; 241 cu in (3.9 L) V8; 260 cu in (4.3 L) V8; 273 cu in (4.5 L) V8; 301 cu in (4.9 L) V8; 318 cu in (5.2 L) V8; 340 cu in (5.6 L) V8; 350 cu in (5.7 L) "Golden Commando" twin 4-barrel V8
- Transmission: 2-speed or 3-speed automatic

Dimensions
- Wheelbase: station wagon: 122.0 in (3,099 mm) all other: 118.0 in (2,997 mm)

The 1957 model year had high sales for the Chrysler Corporation and for the Plymouth line. Plymouth's design was so revolutionary that Chrysler used the slogan, "Suddenly, it's 1960!" to promote the new car.

Standard on all body styles except the convertible was the "Powerflow 6" L-head engine. The convertible was only V8 powered and V8s were available in other Belvederes with an optional "Fury" 301 cu in (4.9 L) version as well as a "High-Performance PowerPAC" at extra cost. A manual transmission was standard with the push-button two-speed PowerFlite optional and the push-button three-speed TorqueFlite automatic also optional on V8 cars. The front suspension introduced Chrysler's Torsion-Aire Torsion bar suspension shared with all Chrysler products starting in 1957.

In 1957, Chrysler products offered a choice of either single or dual headlights. Plymouth installed the headlights in a facia that accommodated dual headlights while offering both single and dual lamps. This appearance can be seen with front turn signal lamps installed inboard, next to the headlight, while vehicles installed with dual headlights offered a concealed turn signal above the headlights in the headlight alcove.

The Belvedere would once again return as a top-level trim for 1958 for the last time. Styling was a continuation of the 1957 models. A 350 cu in (5.7 L) big-block "B" V8 with dual four-barrel carburetors—dubbed "Golden Commando"—was optional on all models. For 1959, the Fury became the top range with a full array of sedans and coupes, and the Belvedere became the middle range. The Savoy became the least expensive model, and the Plaza was discontinued.

The convertible was only available in the Belvedere model between 1956 and 1958.

The 1957–58 Belvedere two-door hardtop gained notoriety from the 1983 movie Christine based on the novel by Stephen King. In the opening scene, in which the title is set as "Detroit, 1957," Christine appears near the end of the assembly line as a lone bright red car in a long line of Buckskin Beige Furys being built for the new model year (1958). (In the novel, it is revealed that her first owner, Roland Lebay, had ordered her with custom paint, as the standard 1958 Fury came only in beige.) For the movie, Christine was painted "toreador red" with an "iceberg white" top.

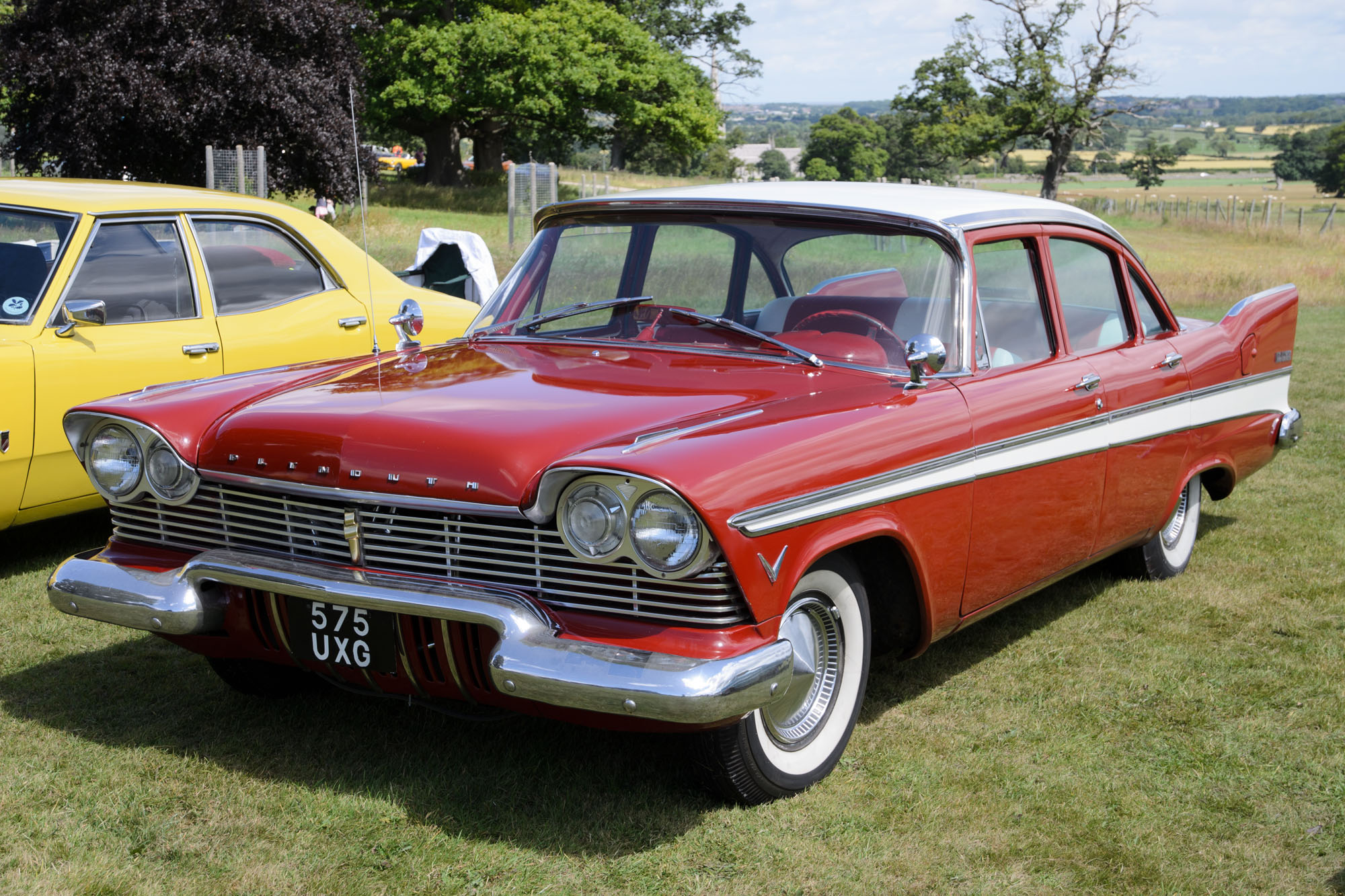
1957 Plymouth Belvedere 4-Door Sedan

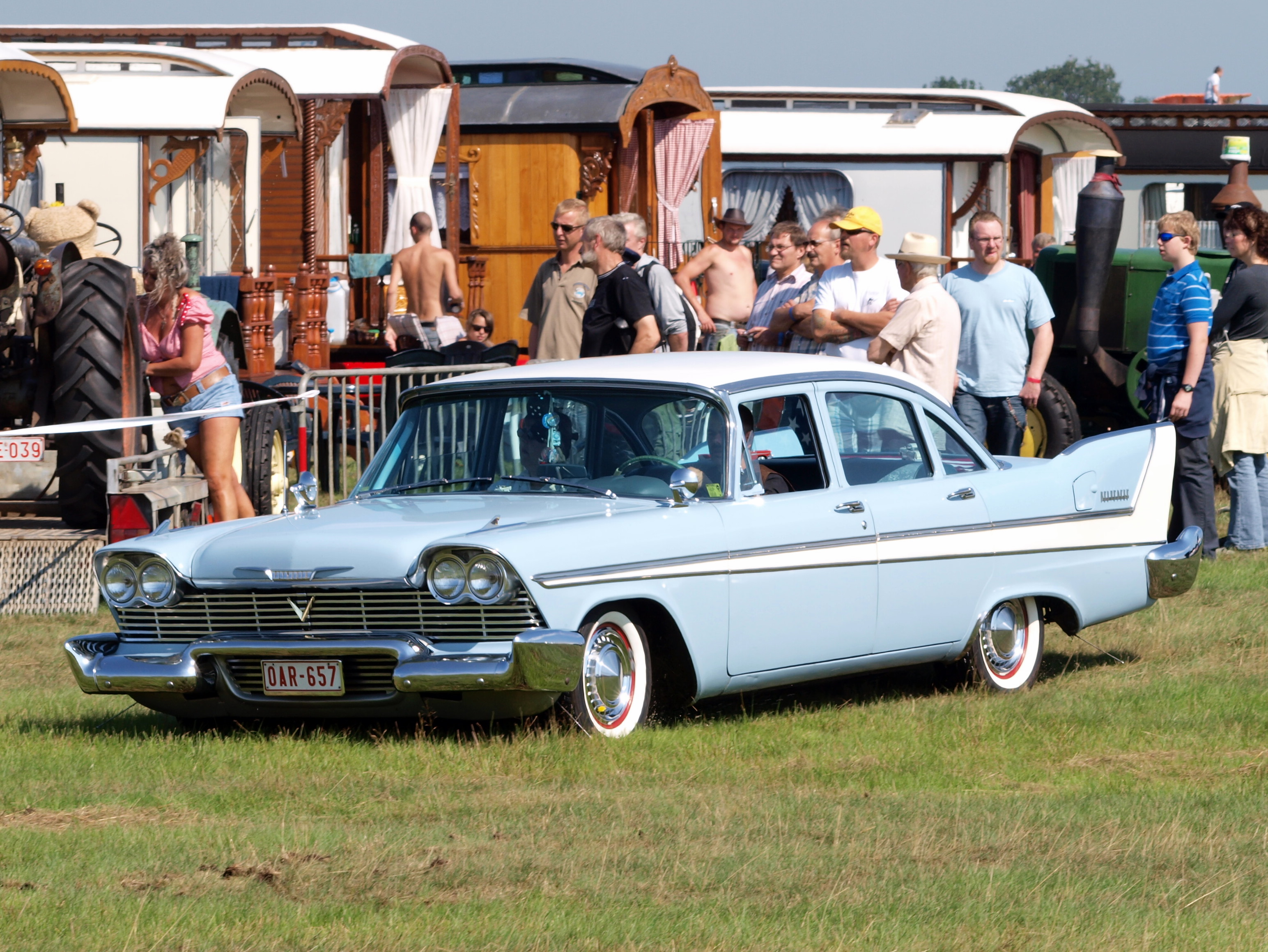
1958 Plymouth Belvedere 4-door sedan

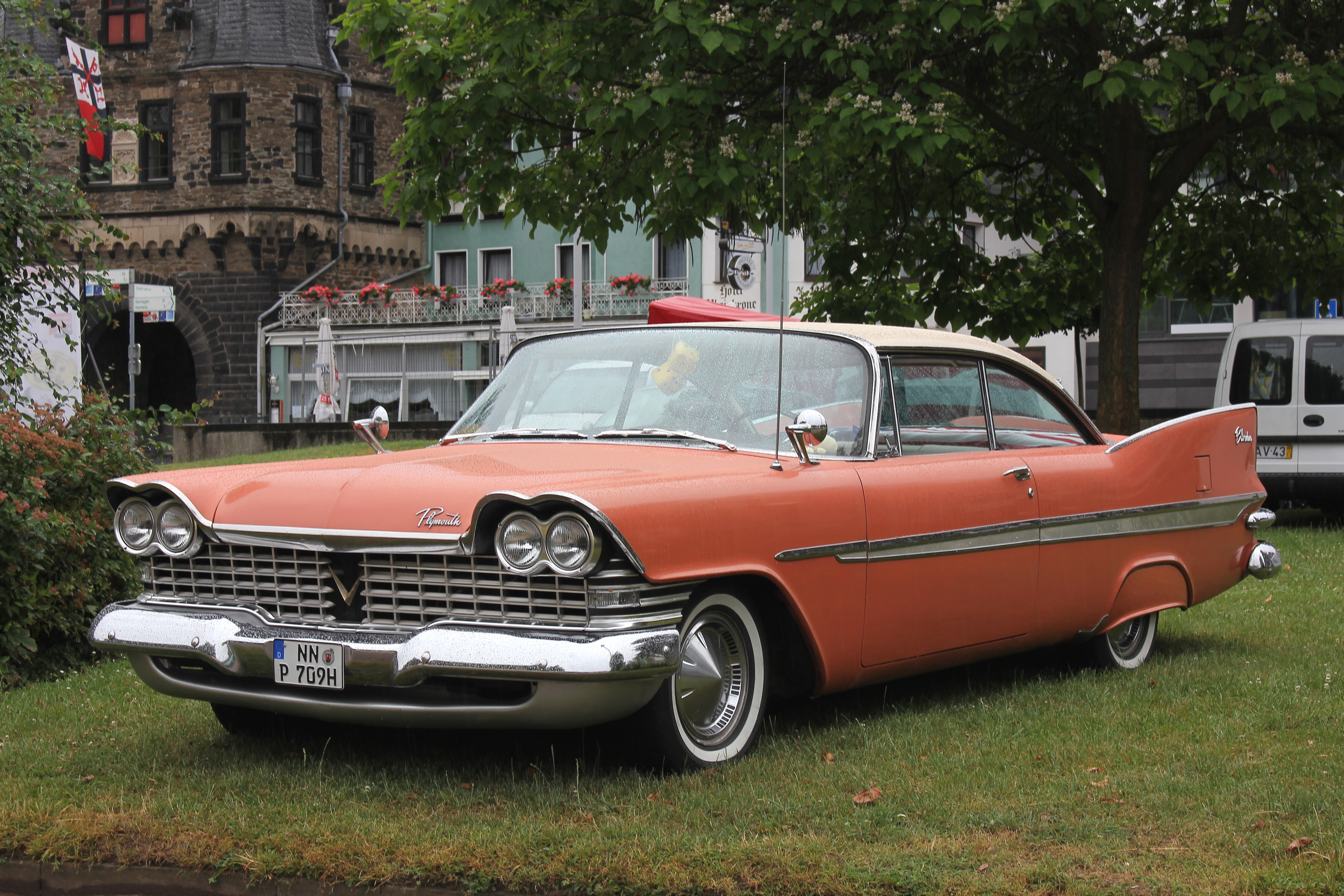
1959 Plymouth Belvedere 2-door hardtop

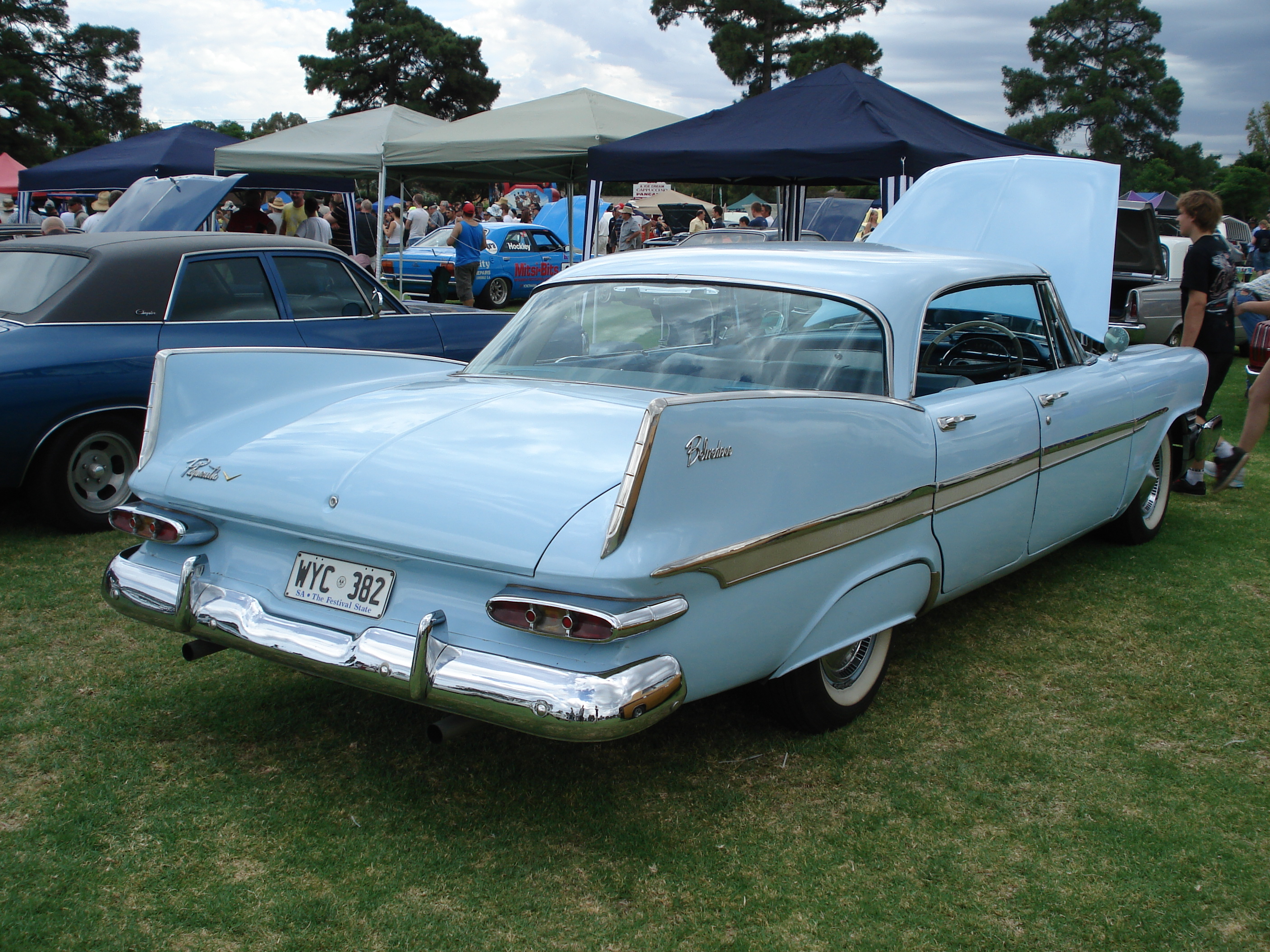
1959 Plymouth Belvedere 4-door hardtop

=== 1960–1961 ===
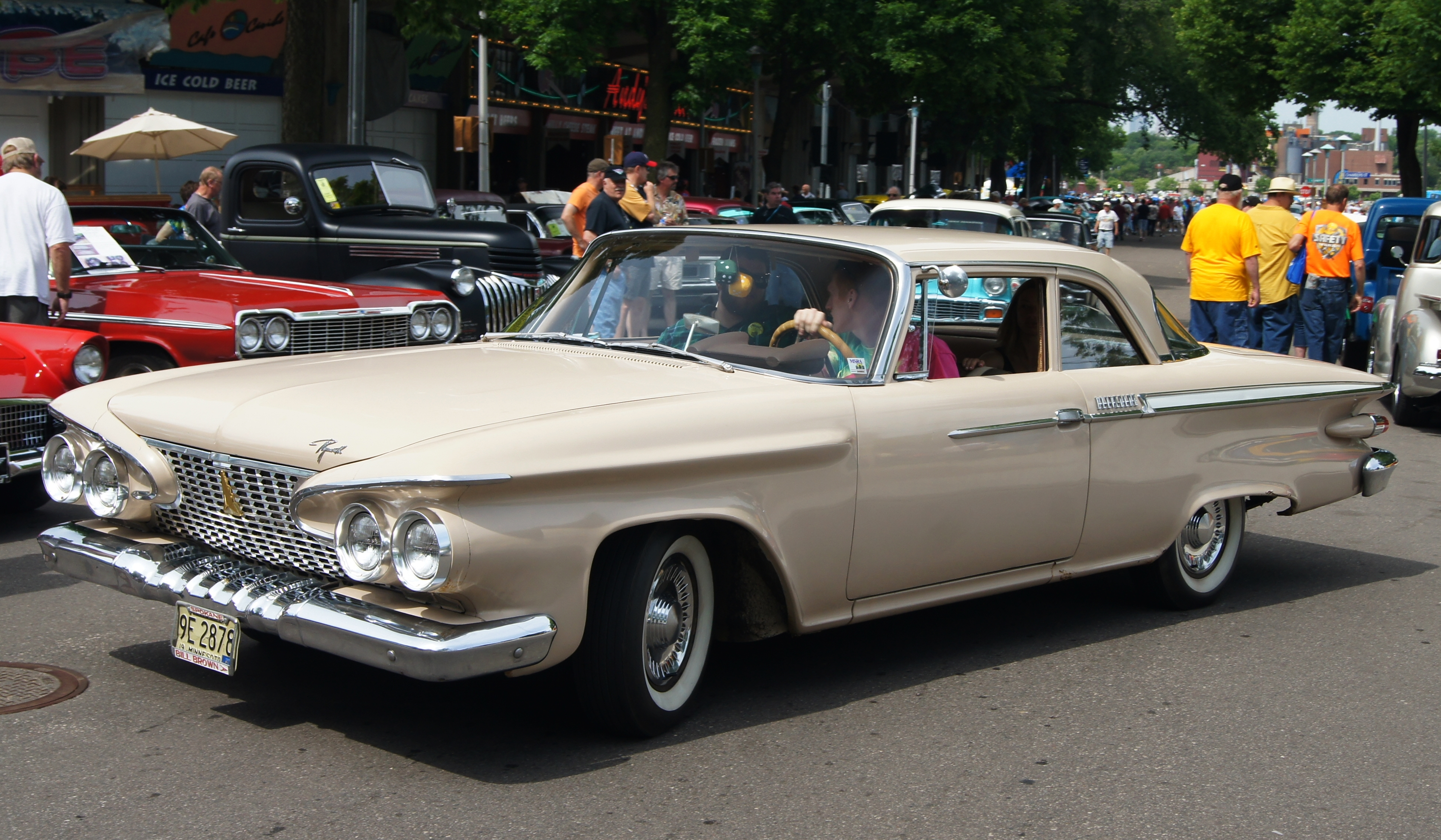
1961 Plymouth Belvedere 2-door sedan

Fourth generation
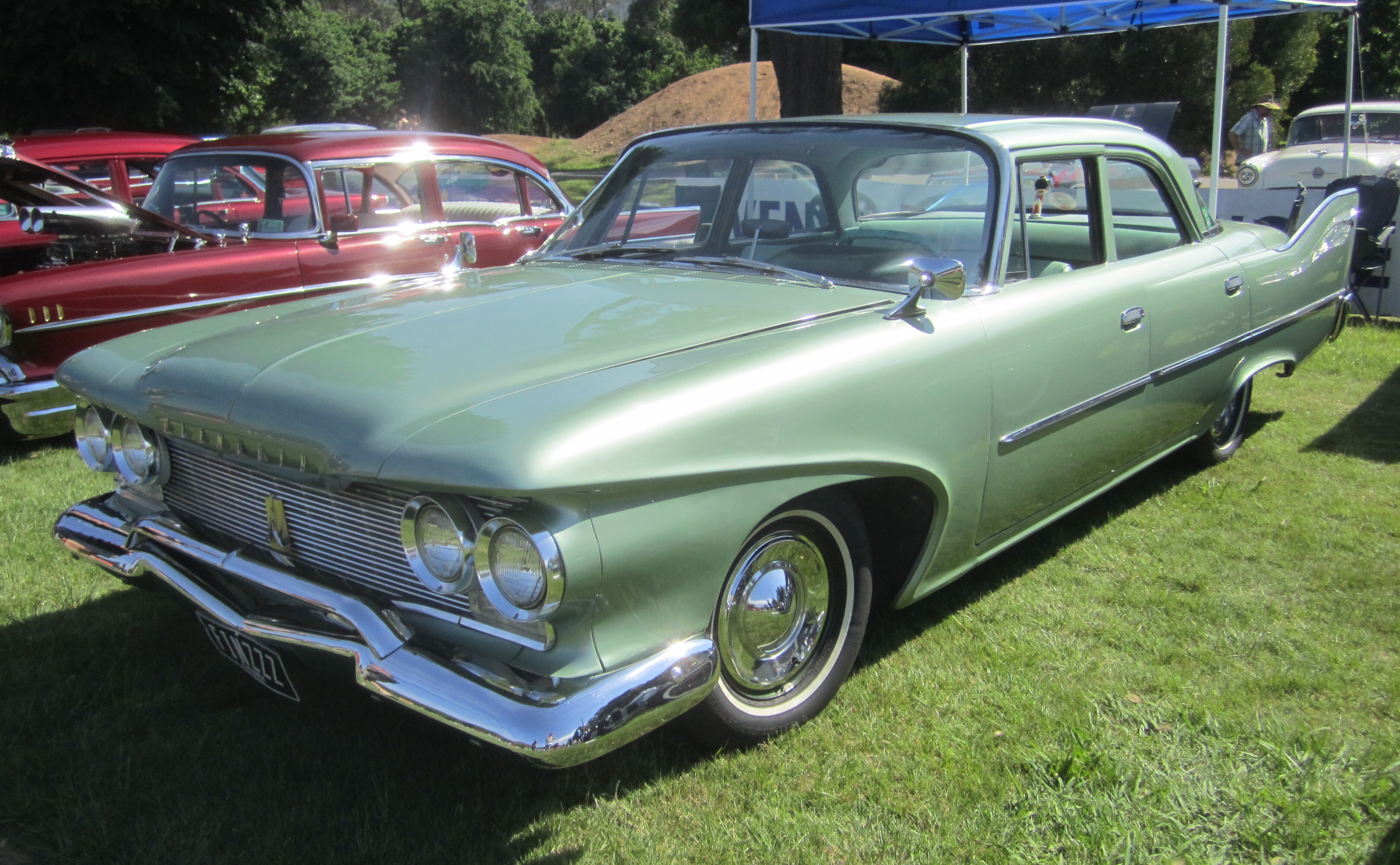
- 1960 Plymouth Belvedere 4-door Sedan

Overview
- Also called: Dodge Savoy (Mexico)
- Model years: 1960–1961
- Assembly: Newark Assembly, Newark, Delaware; Lynch Road Assembly, Detroit, Michigan

Body and chassis
- Body style: 2-door sedan 4-door sedan 2-door hardtop 4-door station wagon
- Related: Dodge Polara; Dodge Dart; Dodge Matador

Powertrain
- Engine: 230.2 cu in (3.8 L) Chrysler Slant Six I6; 241 cu in (3.9 L) V8; 260 cu in (4.3 L) V8; 273 cu in (4.5 L) V8; 318 cu in (5.2 L) V8; 340 cu in (5.6 L) V8; 350 cu in (5.7 L) "Golden Commando" twin 4-barrel V8
- Transmission: 2-speed automatic

Dimensions
- Wheelbase: 118.0 in (2,997 mm)

Starting in 1960, Belvederes got a brand-new standard inline six-cylinder engine replacing the venerable valve-in-block "flathead" six. Colloquially known as the Slant Six, it displaced 225 cu in (3.7 L), featured overhead valves, and a block that was inclined 30 degrees to the right to permit a lower hood line with maximum displacement. This engine used a single-barrel Holley carburetor and became known for its extremely rugged construction, exceptional reliability, and longevity. The V8 engines continued to be optionally available, in displacements of 318 cu in (5.2 L) and 361 cu in (5.9 L).

Unit body construction was introduced throughout the line, though it appeared on certain Plymouths in earlier years such as the 1953 hardtop coupe. This eliminated the frame and was advertised as Unibody.

Under Chrysler president William Newberg, Virgil Exner's styling team was encouraged to go "over the top" with distinctive styling, leading the 1960 models to be popularly dubbed the "jukebox on wheels" and the 1961 models were not well-received and "unfairly maligned just for being different... the cleaner, finless look was certainly on the way in, and today the Belvedere looks distinctive." Despite being good cars in performance, handling, modest weight, and appealing interiors, sales suffered. Plymouth yielded third place in U.S. sales to the 1960 Ramblers.

== Intermediate series ==
=== 1962–1964 ===
Fifth generation
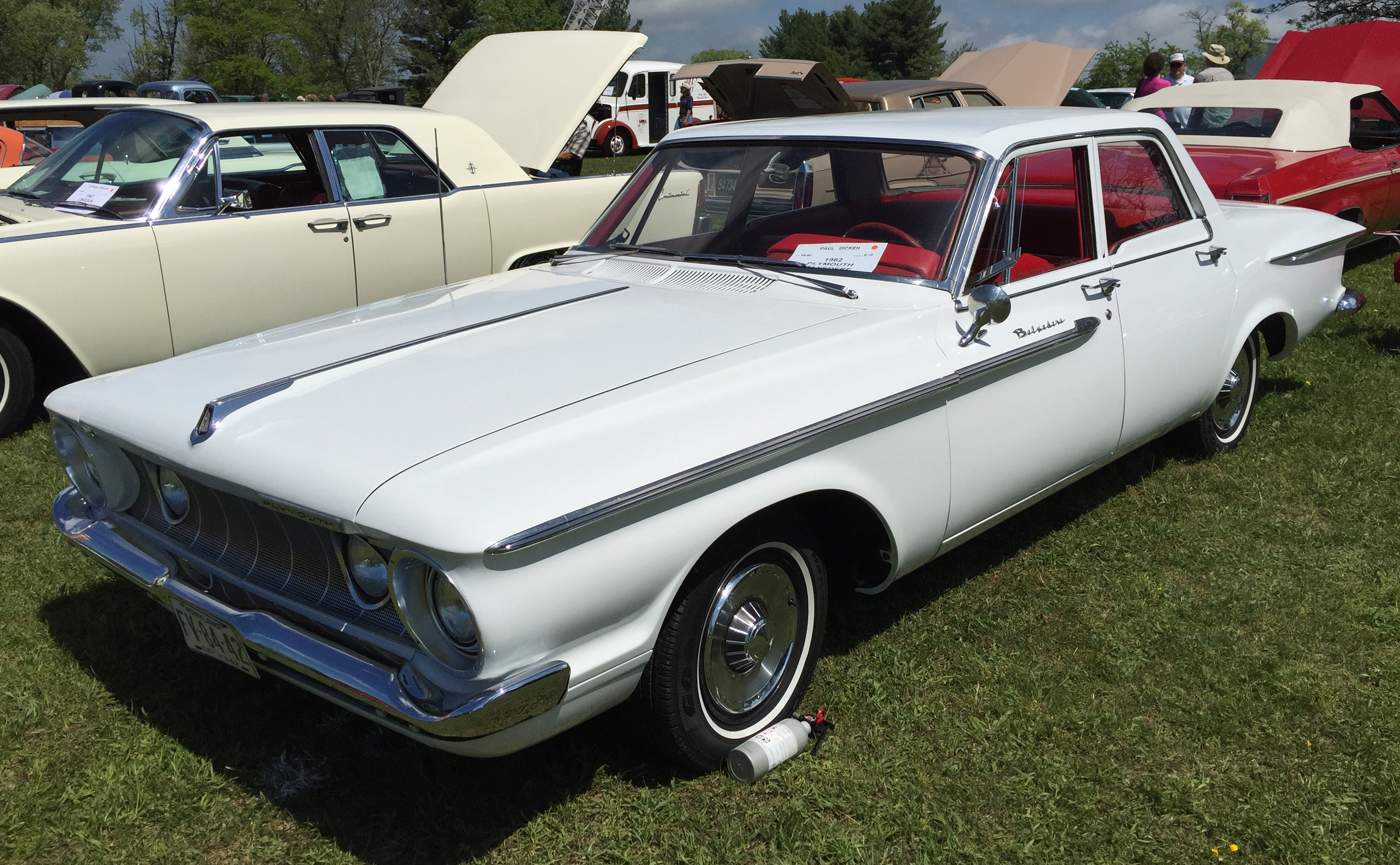
- 1962 Plymouth Belvedere Sedan

Overview
- Model years: 1962–1964
- Assembly: Lynch Road Assembly, Detroit, Michigan; Saint Louis Assembly, Fenton, Missouri; Los Angeles (Maywood) Assembly, Maywood, California

Body and chassis
- Body style: 2-door sedan 4-door sedan 2-door hardtop coupe 4-door station wagon
- Platform: B-body
- Related: Dodge Polara (1962–1964)

Powertrain
- Engine: 225 cu in (3.7 L) Chrysler Slant Six I6; 383 cu in (6.3 L) V8; 413 cu in (6.8 L) V8; 426 cu in (7.0 L) V8 (1964 only)

The 1962 model year full-size Plymouths were "downsized," with more compact outside dimensions. American car buyers at the time were in the thought mode of "bigger is better", and sales of these models suffered. However, the smaller Plymouth provided greater owner approval in their actual use. A Plymouth Belvedere with a six-cylinder engine and automatic transmission was compared to the intermediate-size Ford Fairlane and the compact-size Chevrolet Chevy II in an economy test by Popular Mechanics and the road test concluded that the Belvedere was "a very pleasant transportation package." Another advantage of the smaller and lighter body was in drag racing.

The 1963 and 1964 models used the same unibody platform as the 1962s, but were restyled to look longer and wider.

The 1964 Belvedere (and corresponding Fury hardtop coupes) featured a new "slant-back" roofline that proved to be popular, and sales improved significantly over the previous design.

The 1964 Belvedere was also the car used to introduce the 426 Chrysler Hemi engine, which used a canted large-valve arrangement. This was such a significant high-RPM breathing improvement that Hemi-equipped Plymouth Belvederes won first, second, and third at NASCAR's 1964 Daytona race. One of the winning drivers was Richard Petty.

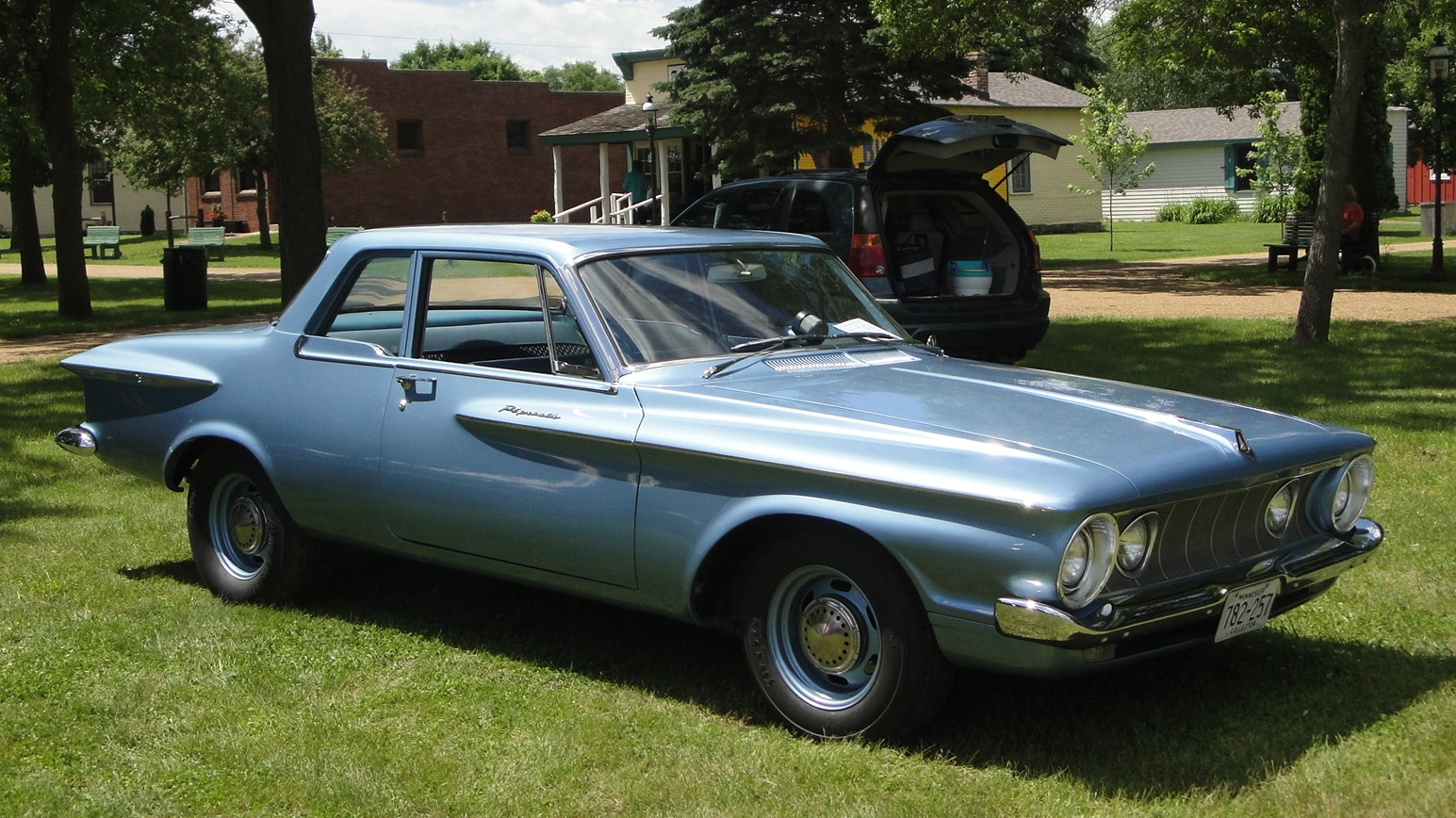
1962 Plymouth Belvedere 2-door Hardtop

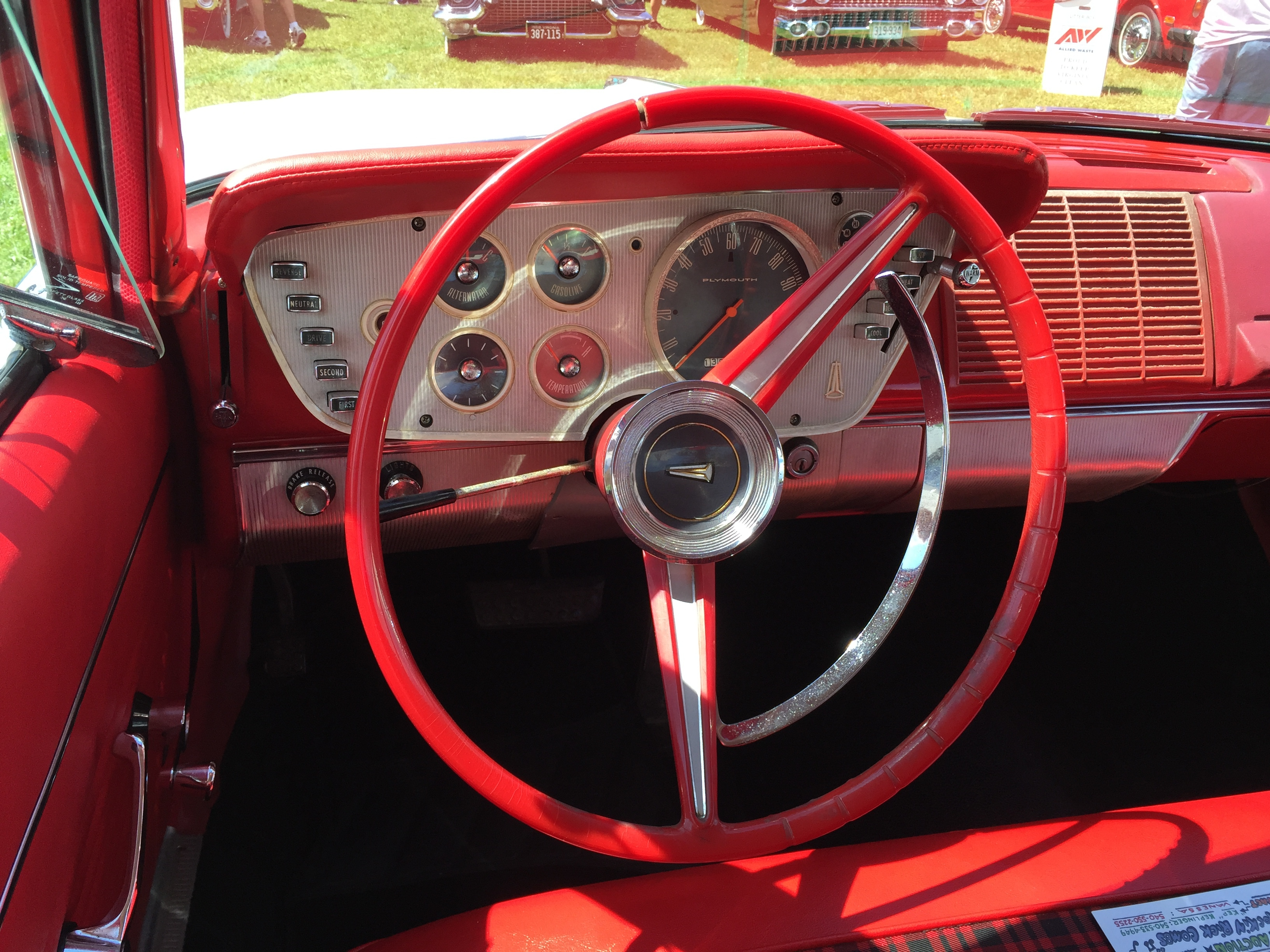
1962 Plymouth Beldevere 4-door sedan interior

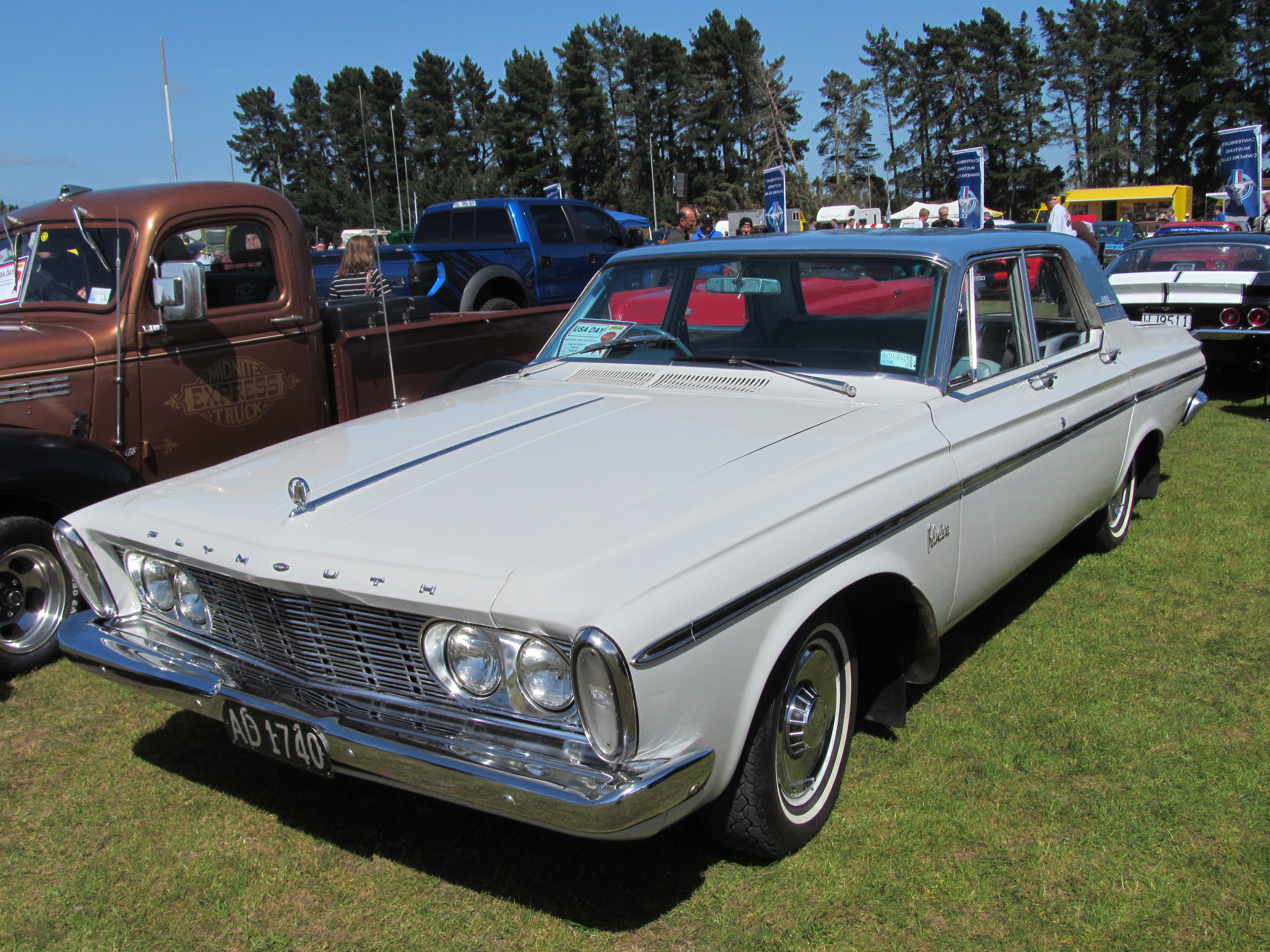
1963 Plymouth Belvedere 4-Door Sedan

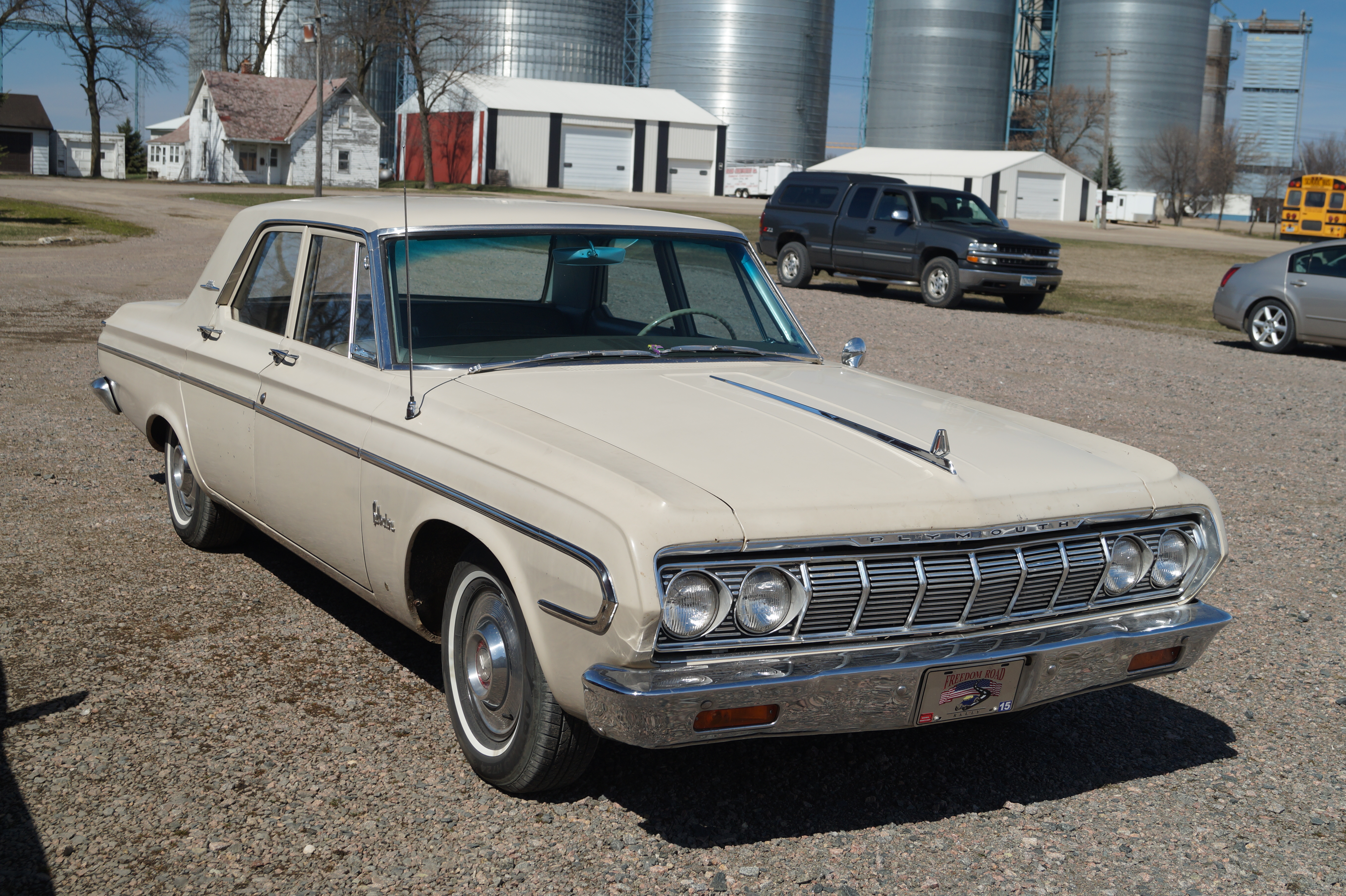
1964 Plymouth Belvedere 4-door sedan

=== 1965–1967 ===
Sixth generation
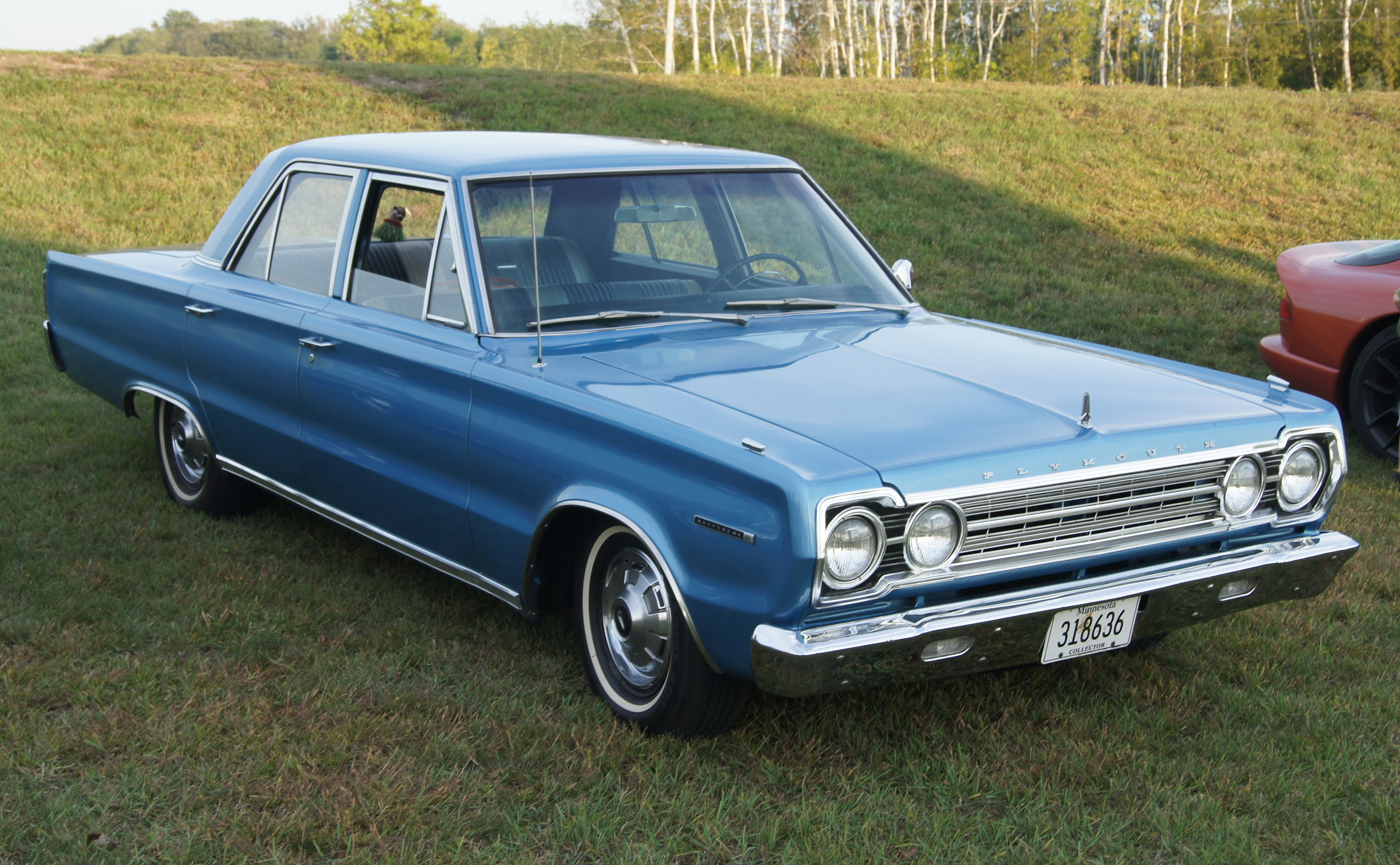
- 1967 Plymouth Belvedere II 4-door sedan

Overview
- Model years: 1965–1967
- Assembly: Lynch Road Assembly, Detroit, Michigan; Saint Louis Assembly, Fenton, Missouri; Los Angeles Assembly, Maywood, California

Body and chassis
- Body style: 2-door sedan 4-door sedan 2-door hardtop 2-door convertible 4-door station wagon
- Platform: B-body
- Related: Dodge Coronet

Powertrain
- Engine: 225 cu in (3.7 L) Slant-6 I6 273 cu in (4.5 L) LA V8; 318 cu in (5.2 L) LA V8; 361 cu in (5.9 L) B V8; 383 cu in (6.3 L) B V8; 426 cu in (7.0 L) Wedge V8; 426 cu in (7.0 L) Hemi V8 440 cu in (7.2 L) RB V8
- Transmission: 3-speed A903 Manual; 3-speed A727 automatic 4-speed A833 manual

In 1965, Plymouth once again made the Fury a full-size car, and Belvedere ostensibly became the intermediate size offering. However, the Belvedere was little changed, and most dimensions and weights remained the same—the Fury was merely enlarged, restoring a full-sized line which Plymouth had been lacking. The Belvedere line was divided into the Belvedere I, Belvedere II, and Satellite subseries, the latter available only as hardtop coupe and convertible, and featuring the 273 cu in (4.5 L) "LA block" V8 as standard equipment. The line was restyled in 1966, and the high-performance GTX was added in 1967.

The pilot episode for the television show Adam-12 featured a 1967 Belvedere as the standard LAPD police cruiser.

Engines:

Model Year	Displacement, Designation, Carburetor	Power	Torque
1965–1967	225 cu in (3.7 L) Slant-6 I6 1-Barrel	145 hp (108 kW; 147 PS)	215 lb⋅ft (292 N⋅m)
1965–1967	273 cu in (4.5 L) LA V8 2-Barrel	180 hp (134 kW; 182 PS)	260 lb⋅ft (353 N⋅m)
1965–1967	318 cu in (5.2 L) LA V8 2-Barrel	230 hp (172 kW; 233 PS)	340 lb⋅ft (461 N⋅m)
1965	361 cu in (5.9 L) B V8 2-Barrel	265 hp (198 kW; 269 PS)	380 lb⋅ft (515 N⋅m)
1967	383 cu in (6.3 L) B V8 2-Barrel	270 hp (201 kW; 274 PS)	390 lb⋅ft (529 N⋅m)
1965–1967	383 cu in (6.3 L) B V8 4-Barrel	325 hp (242 kW; 330 PS)	425 lb⋅ft (576 N⋅m)
1965	426 cu in (7.0 L) Wedge V8 4-Barrel	365 hp (272 kW; 370 PS)	470 lb⋅ft (637 N⋅m)
1967	426 cu in (7.0 L) Hemi V8 2×4-Barrel	425 hp (317 kW; 431 PS)	490 lb⋅ft (664 N⋅m)
1967	440 cu in (7.2 L) RB V8 4-Barrel	375 hp (280 kW; 380 PS)	480 lb⋅ft (651 N⋅m)

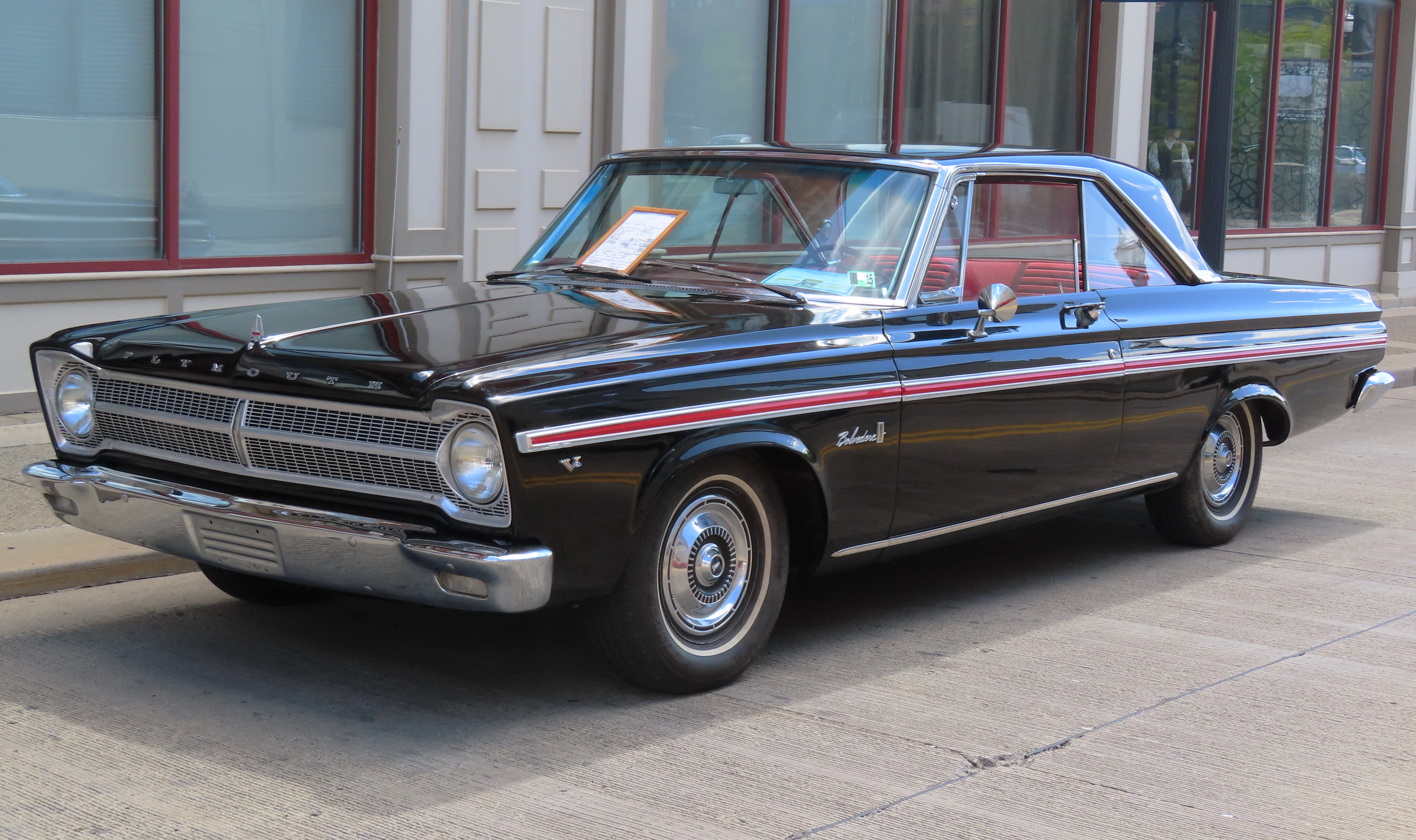
1965 Plymouth Belvedere II 2-door hardtop

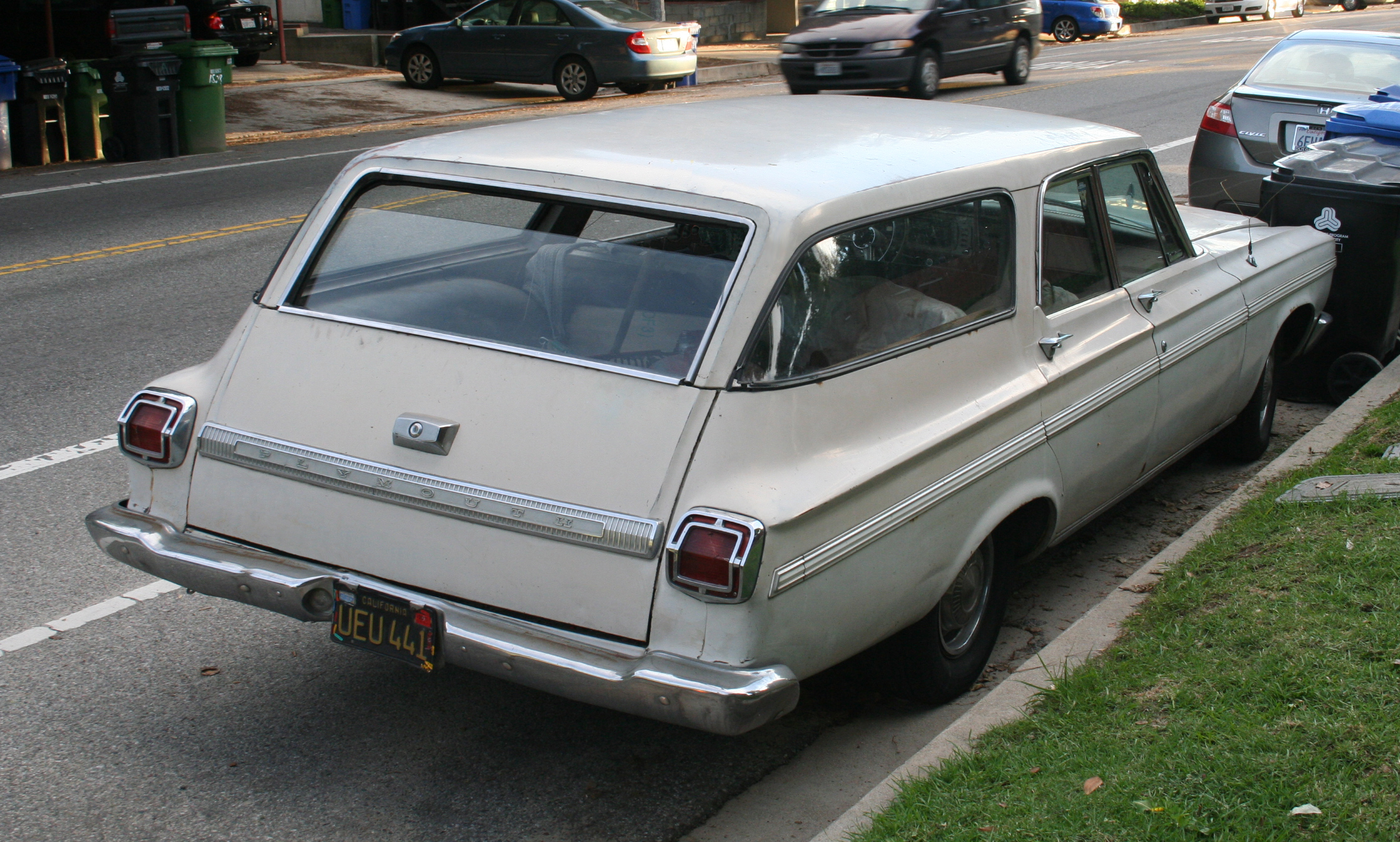
1965 Plymouth Belvedere II wagon

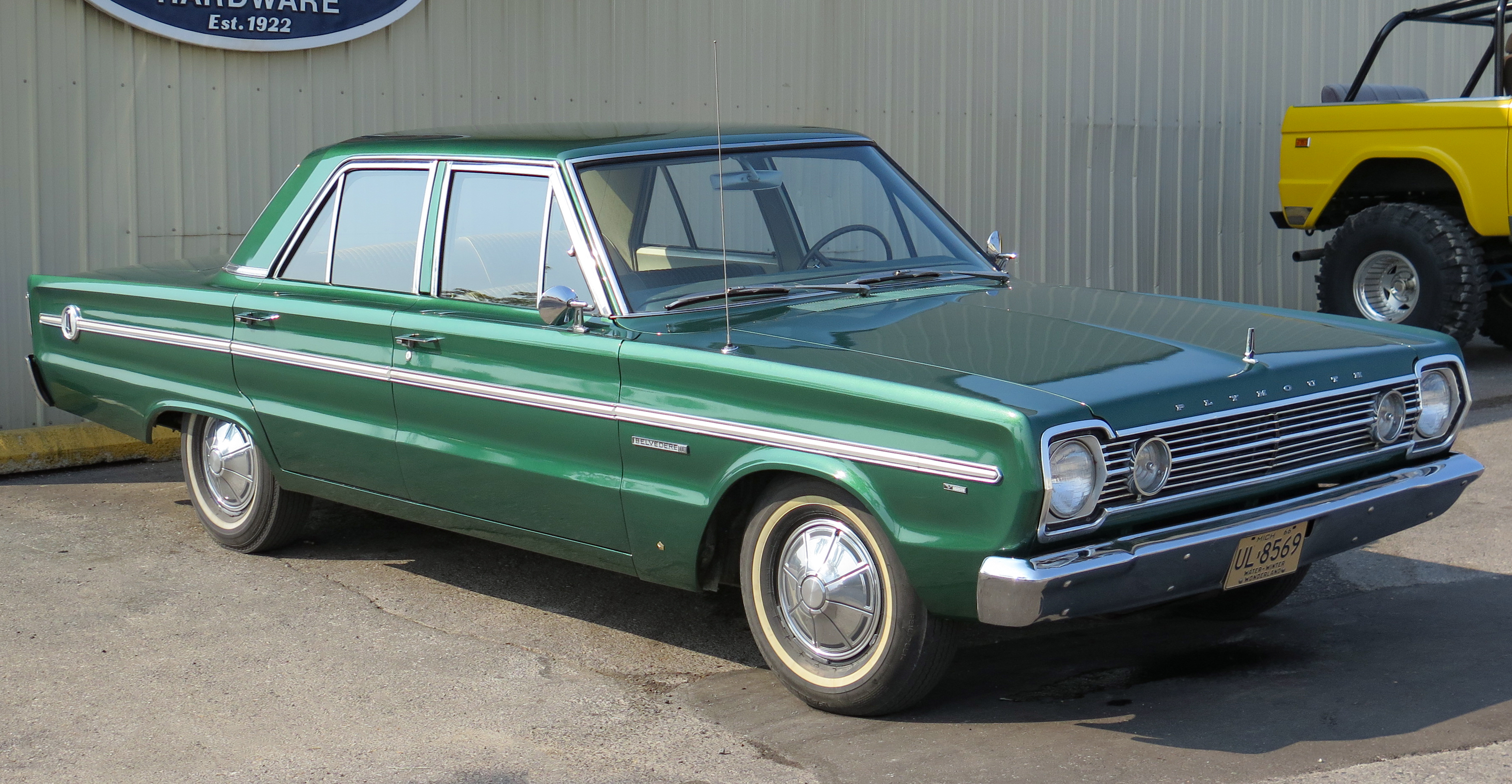
1966 Plymouth Belvedere II 4-door Sedan

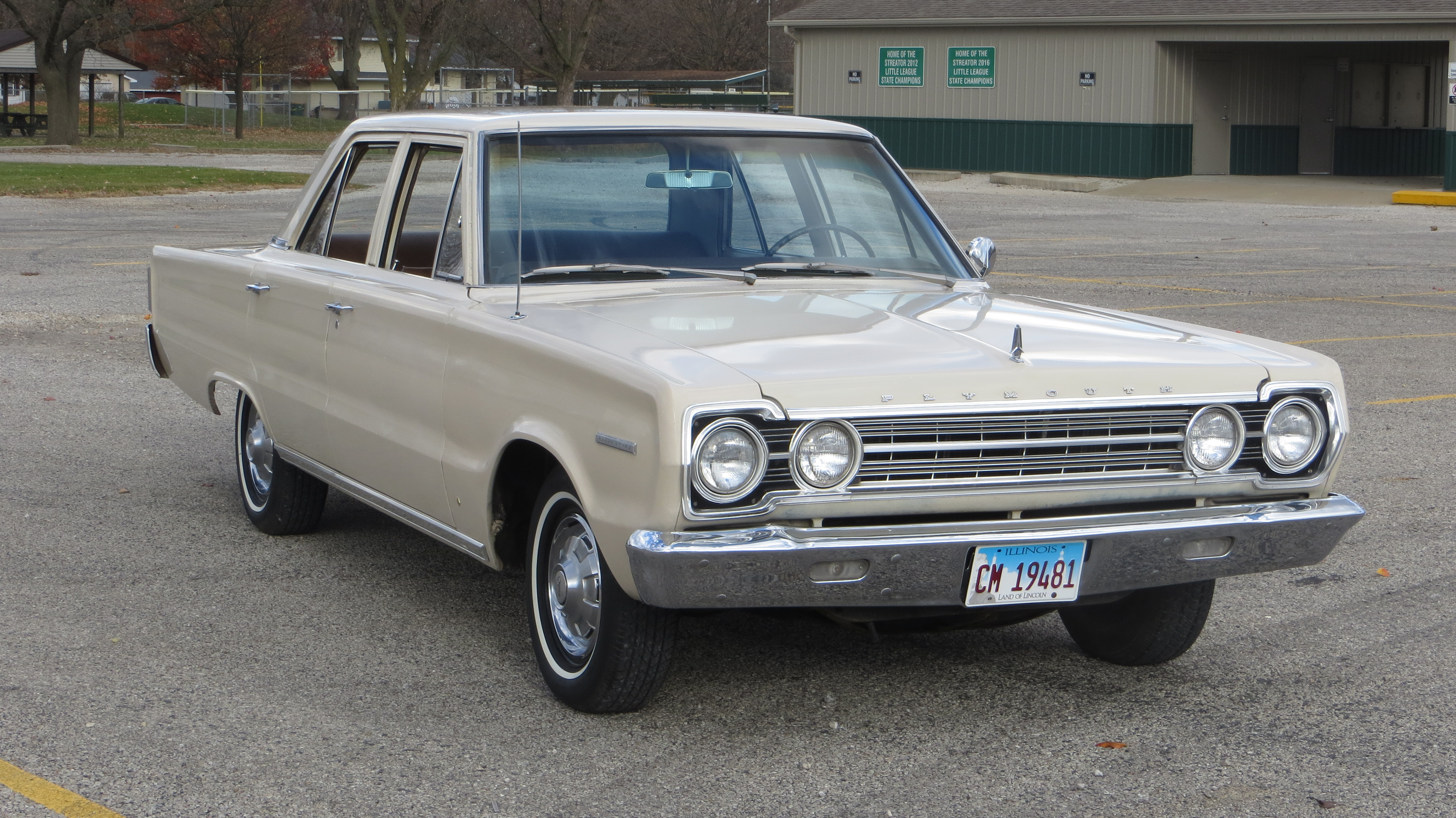
1967 Plymouth Belvedere I 4-door sedan

=== 1968–1970 ===
Seventh generation
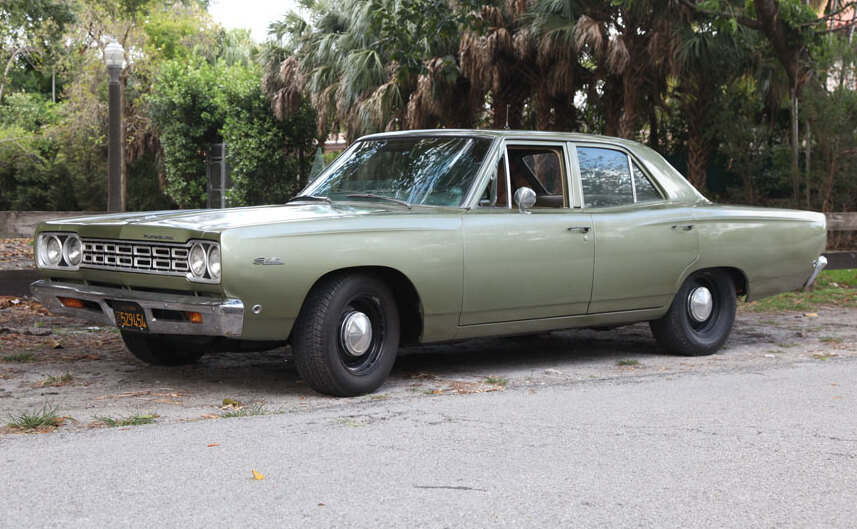
- 1968 Plymouth Satellite

Overview
- Model years: 1968–1970
- Assembly: Lynch Road Assembly, Detroit, Michigan; Saint Louis Assembly, Fenton, Missouri; Los Angeles Assembly, Maywood, California

Body and chassis
- Body style: 2-door coupe 4-door sedan 4-door station wagon
- Platform: B-body

Powertrain
- Engine: 273 cu in (4.5 L) V8; 383 cu in (6.3 L) V8; 318 cu in (5.2 L) V8; 340 cu in (5.6 L) V8; 426 cu in (7.0 L) Hemi V8

Dimensions
- Wheelbase: 116.0 in (2,946 mm)
- Length: 202.7 in (5,149 mm)
- Width: 76.4 in (1,941 mm)
- Height: 54.7 in (1,389 mm)

In 1968, the Belvedere—along with the rest of Chrysler's B-body offerings—was reskinned with "Coke bottle styling." The Belvedere II was dropped, but the Sport Satellite was added to the overall lineup, using the same sheet metal.

The new LA-style lightweight 318 engine was introduced this year and would remain available on the Belvedere throughout its production. The Plymouth Road Runner was introduced as a low-price, high-performance alternative to the GTX. Richard Petty won the Grand National championship in NASCAR in a Belvedere. The GTX came standard with the 440 CID engine and the Road Runner with the 383 Magnum, with the 440 six-barrel or the 426 Hemi engines optional.

The Belvedere name was dropped at the end of the 1970 model year, replaced by the Satellite name originally reserved for higher-end Belvederes. It lasted only through 1974, becoming the Fury in 1975 when the longer-wheelbase Fury model became the Gran Fury.

== NASCAR ==
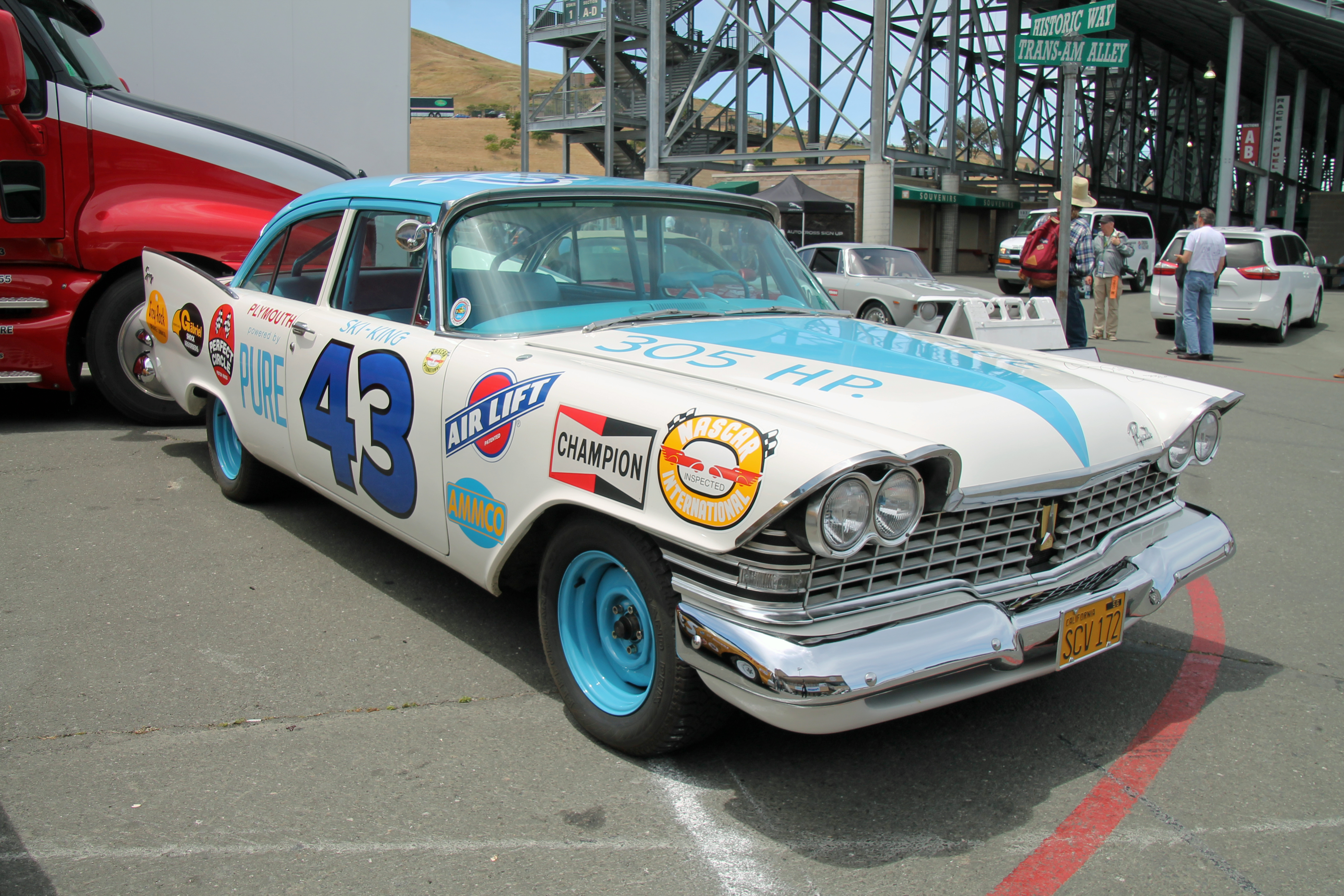
1959 Plymouth Belvedere

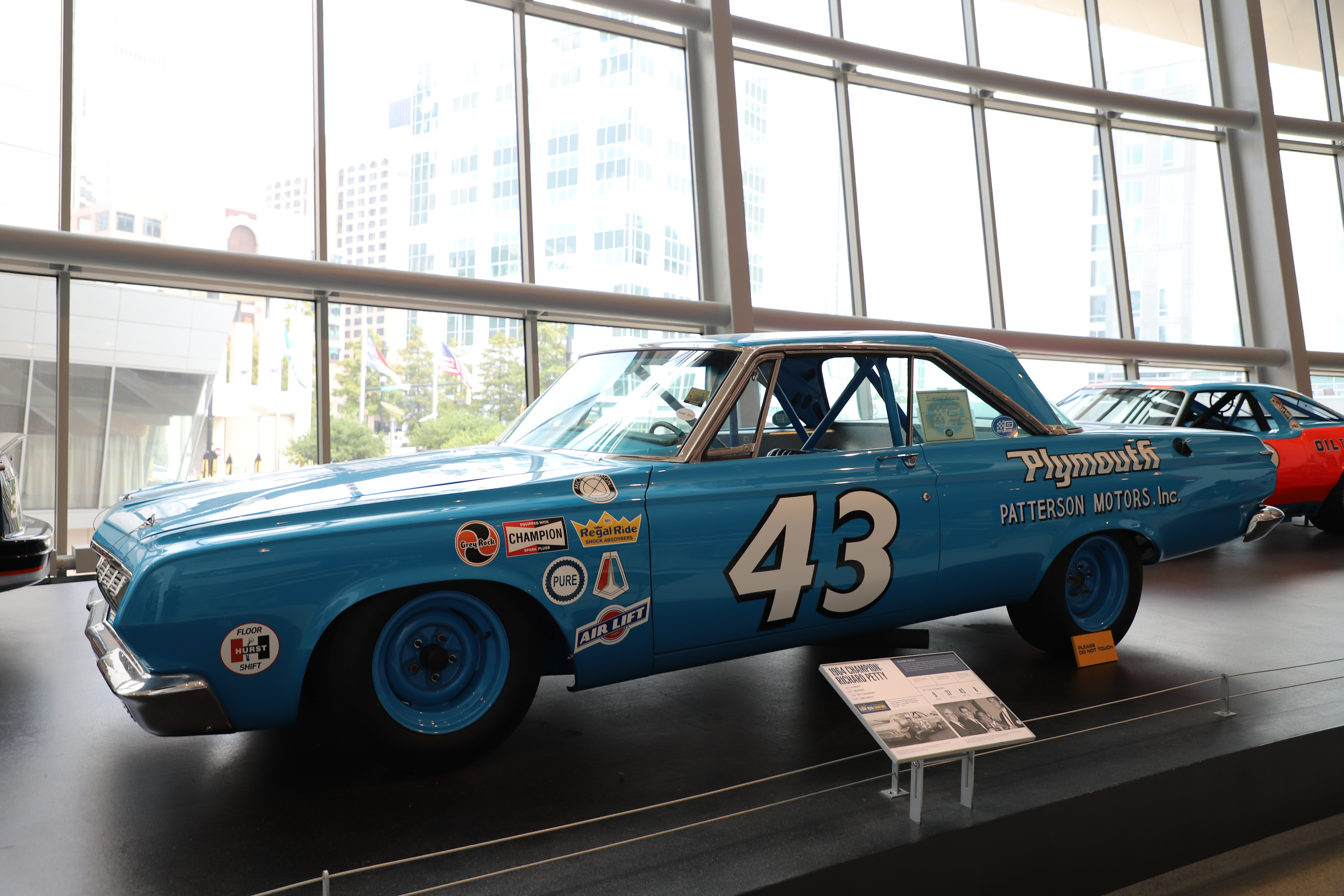
Richard Petty's 1964 Plymouth Belvedere at the NASCAR Hall of Fame in Charlotte, NC.

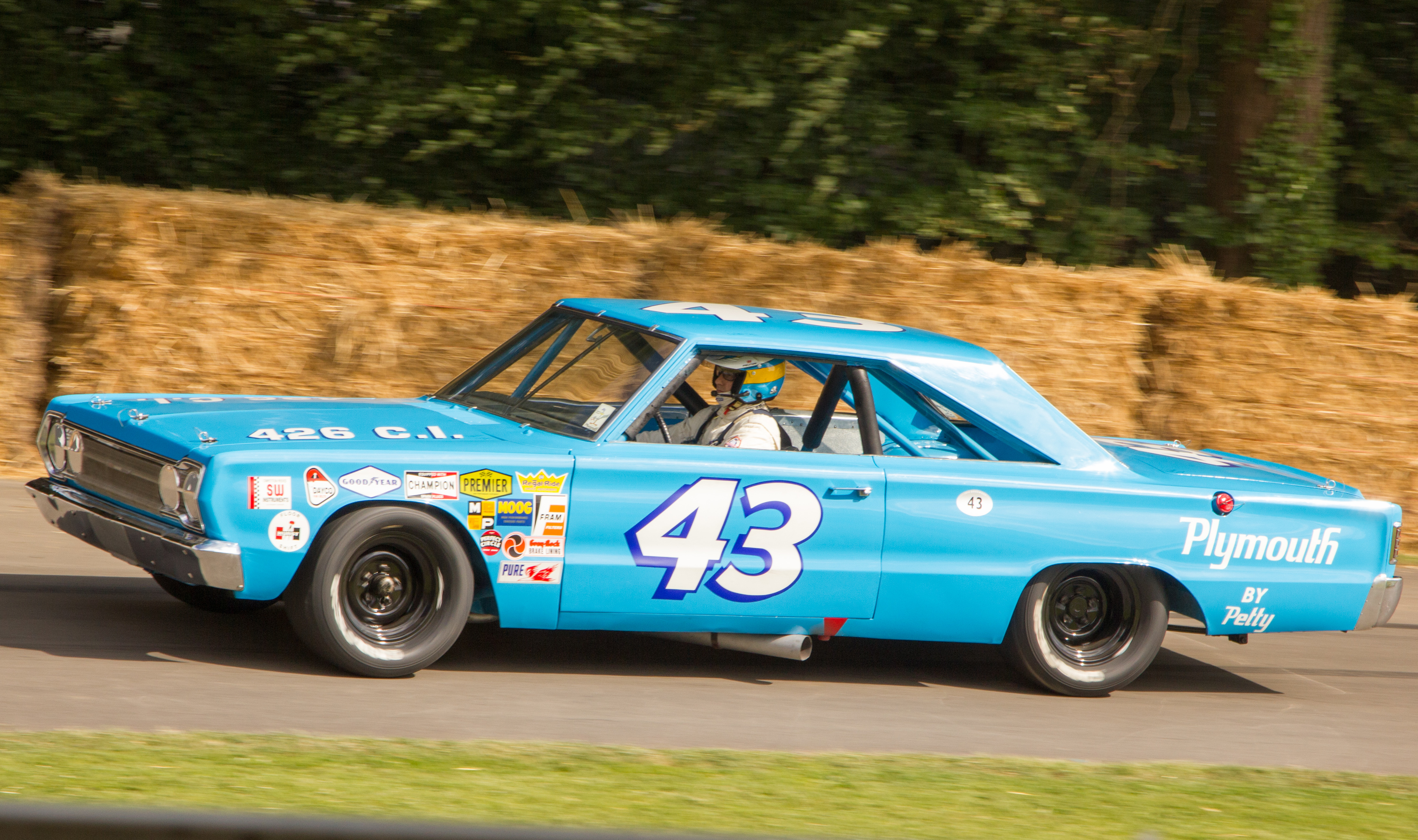
Richard Petty's 1967 Plymouth Belvedere at the Goodwood Festival of Speed in 2014

== Police ==
Belvederes were used in police service from the late 1960s to the early 1970s, when they were replaced by the Plymouth Gran Fury. They were prominent in both the LAPD and New York Police Department.

== Australian production ==
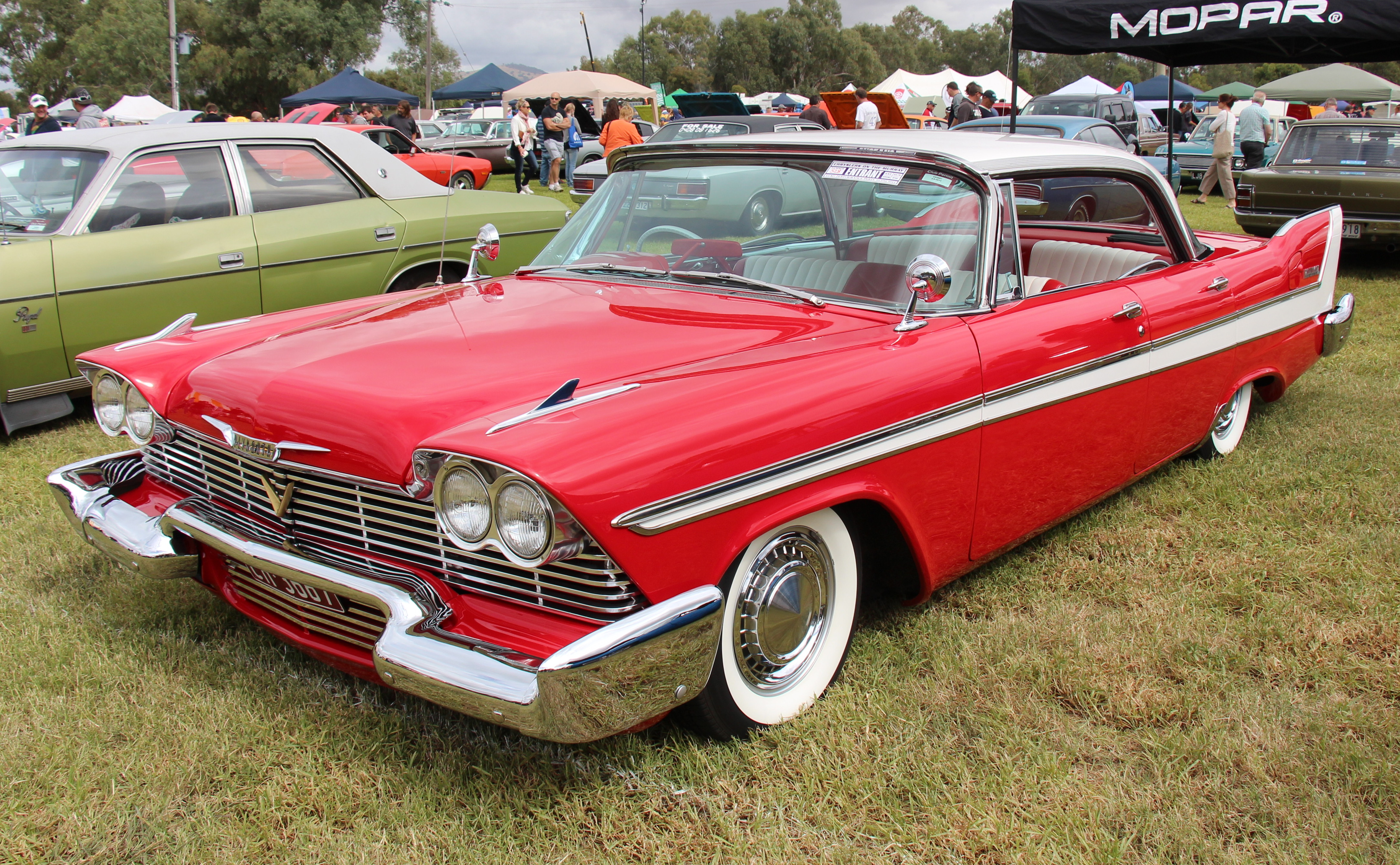
Chrysler Australia also produced the 4 door Hardtop in 1958

The Plymouth Belvedere was also produced by Chrysler Australia. The first model, based on the 1953 US Plymouth, featured a high level of Australian content, with body panels pressed in Chrysler Australia's Keswick facility in South Australia and matched with a 217.8 cubic inch (3,569 cc) side-valve six-cylinder engine, imported from Chrysler UK. It was produced as a four-door sedan and as a locally developed two-door coupe utility, along with similar Cranbrook and Savoy models, until it was replaced by the Chrysler Royal in 1957. The Belvedere was reintroduced to the Australian market in early 1958 when Chrysler Australia began assembling the current model Belvedere four-door hardtop which was imported from the U.S. in knocked-down form. The 1959 model was equipped with a 318 cubic inch V8 engine and push-button automatic transmission. Chrysler Australia replaced their Plymouth Belvedere, Dodge Custom Royal and De Soto Firesweep models with the Dodge Phoenix in 1960.

== Oklahoma semicentennial ==
During Oklahoma's 50th anniversary, a new 1957 Plymouth Belvedere was sealed in a concrete enclosure as a time capsule in downtown Tulsa on the grounds of the brand-new county courthouse. It was unearthed on June 14, 2007, during the state's centennial celebrations, and was publicly unveiled the following day. In line with the Cold War realities of late-1950s America, the concrete enclosure was advertised as having been built to withstand a nuclear attack. The concrete enclosure, however, was not airtight and allowed water to leak in, which caused significant damage to the vehicle.

The controversial televised vehicle customizer Boyd Coddington was to have been the first to start the unburied car, had it been operable.

The car was the prize of a 1957 contest to guess the population of Tulsa in the year 2007. The winning entrant, Raymond Humbertson, guessed 384,743 versus the actual figure of 382,457. However, Humbertson died in 1979 and now only distant relatives remain.

A second car, this time a Plymouth Prowler, was encased in a vault in Tulsa's Centennial Park (formerly Central Park) in 1998 to celebrate the city's centennial. After discovering what had become of the 1957 Belvedere, the Prowler was moved above ground, and a mound was formed over it. It is to be revealed after the same time as the Belvedere, in 2048.
