= Los Angeles (Maywood) Assembly =

Former Chrysler assembly plant in Commerce, California, USA

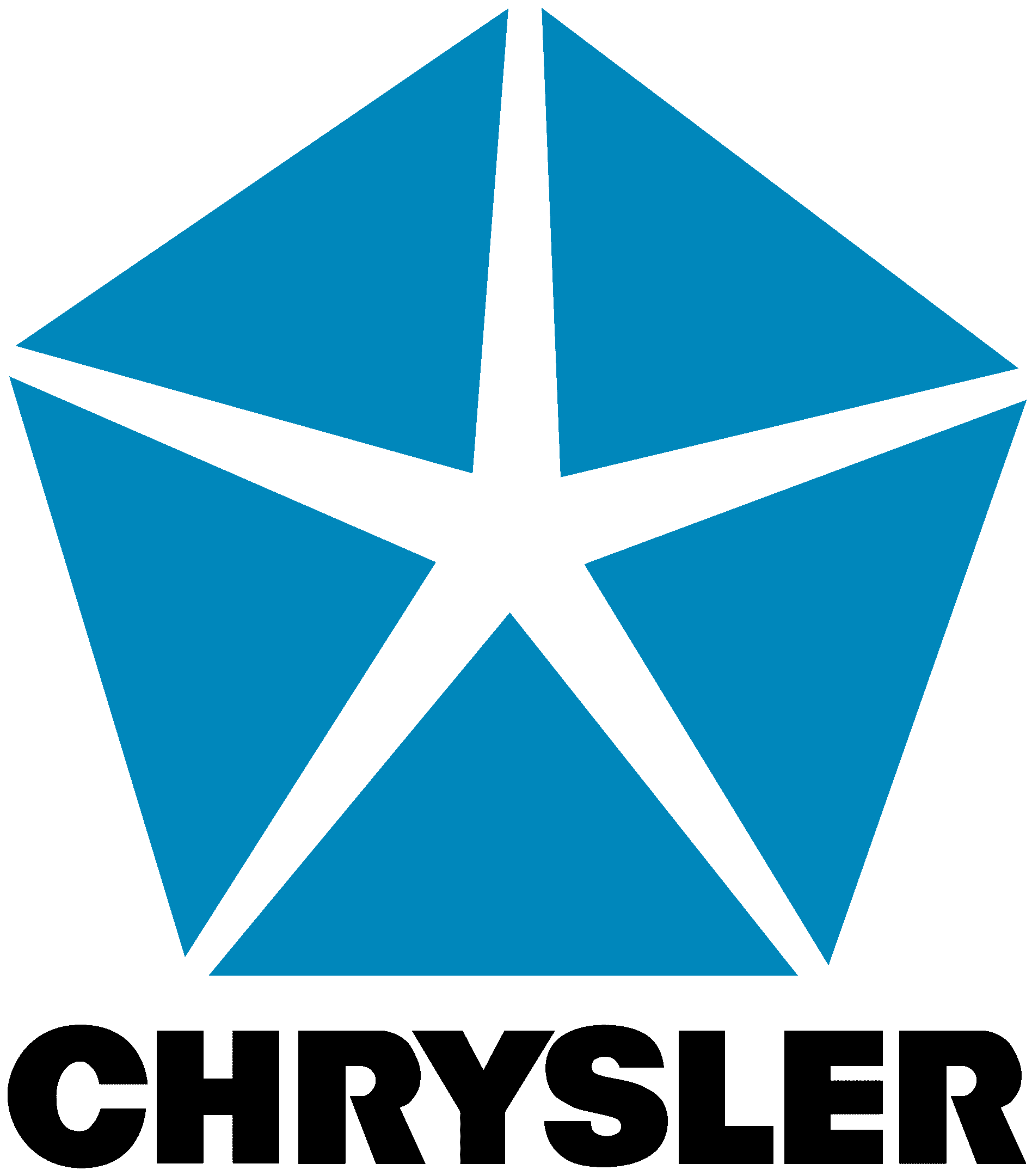
- Operated: 1932–1971
- Location: 5800 Eastern Avenue; Commerce, California, United States
- Coordinates: 33.9853°N 118.1616°W
- Industry: Automotive
- Products: Automobiles
- Owner: Chrysler

Los Angeles (Maywood) Assembly was a Chrysler assembly plant located in Commerce, California. It was an assembly location where vehicles were shipped by railroad in "knock-down kits" from Detroit. The kits were locally assembled, combined with locally sourced parts. Vehicles assembled at Maywood were largely sold in California and the Western United States. It operated from 1932 until 1971.

The Ford Maywood Assembly Plant was across the street and began operations in 1948. GM later opened the South Gate Assembly farther south in 1936.

== History ==
In 1932 the Los Angeles Assembly manufactured Dodge and Plymouth trucks. During World War II the plant switched to war production, manufacturing over 40,000 aircraft engines, as well as Boeing B-17 Flying Fortress and Lockheed PV-2 cabin tops.

=== Automobiles ===
Chrysler Corporation automobiles assembled there were:

- Plymouth (1932-1964)
- Dodge (1946-1964)
- DeSoto (1932-1959)
- Chrysler (1948-1960)

Models assembled there include:

- Plymouth Valiant (1960-1971)
- Dodge Lancer (1960-1962)
- Plymouth Barracuda (1964-1966, 1969-1970)
- Dodge Challenger (1969-1970)
- Plymouth Belvedere (1964-1971)
- Dodge Coronet (1964-1971)

== See also ==
- List of Chrysler factories
- Motor vehicle assembly plants in California
