= Benson Municipal Airport =

Benson Municipal Airport may refer to:

- Benson Municipal Airport (Arizona) in Benson, Arizona, United States (FAA: E95)
- Benson Municipal Airport (Minnesota) in Benson, Minnesota, United States (FAA/IATA: BBB)
