= Dodge Lancer =

Cars marketed by Dodge division of Chrysler

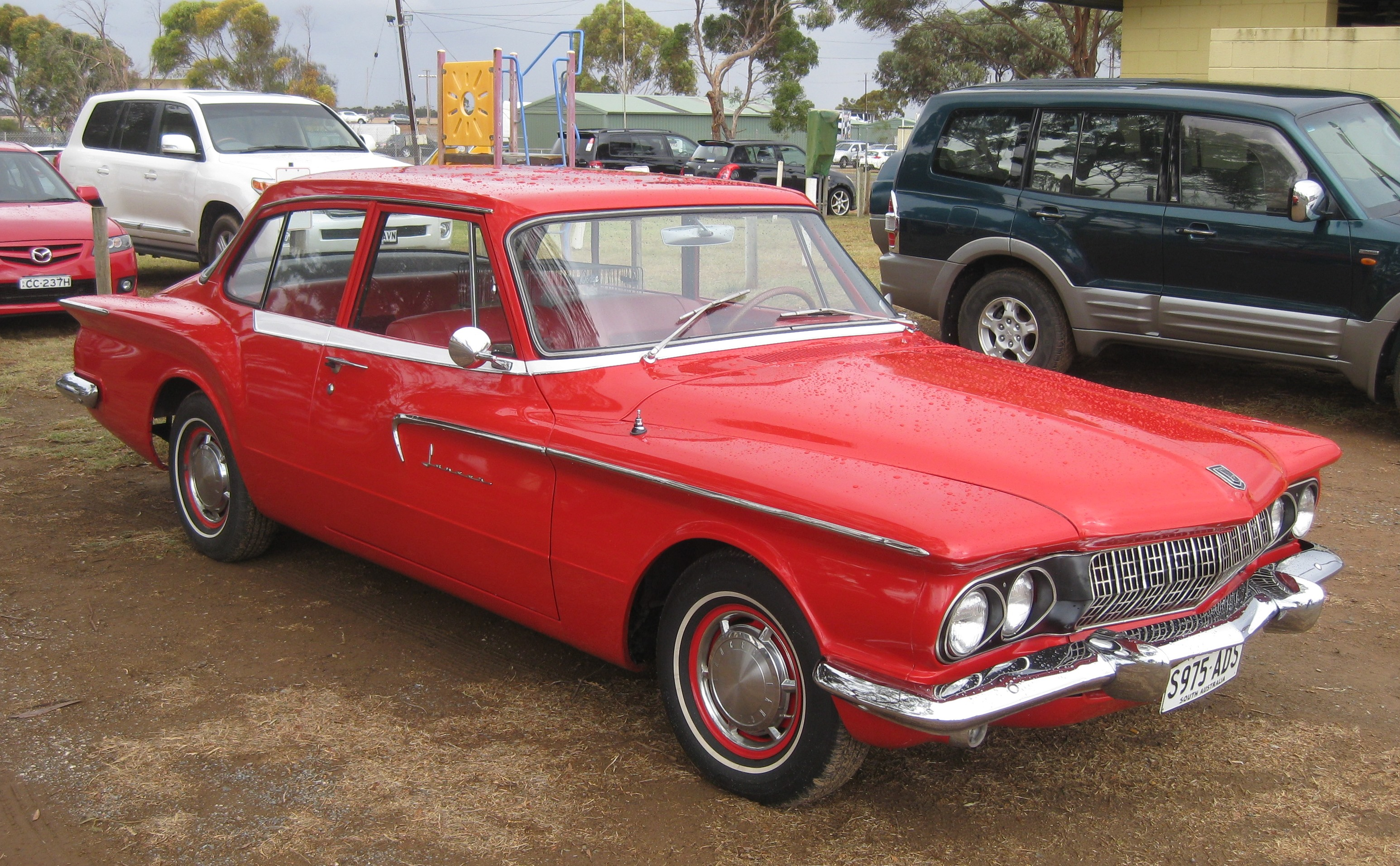
- 1962 Dodge Lancer 170 2-Door Sedan

Overview
- Manufacturer: Dodge (Chrysler)
- Production: 1955–1959; 1960–1962; 1984–1989

Body and chassis
- Platform: FR layout A-body (for 1961–62); FF layout H-body (for 1985–89)

Chronology
- Successor: Dodge Dart (for 1963); Dodge Spirit (for 1989)

The Dodge Lancer is an automobile that was marketed in three unrelated versions by Dodge during the 1950s, 1960s, and 1980s. The first version debuted as a hardtop version of the full-sized 1955 Dodge, and was produced in that form until 1959. The second version revived the nameplate in 1961 for a Chrysler A platform-based compact that was marketed for two model years and replaced by the Dodge Dart. The third version returned the Lancer nameplate in 1985 for a front-wheel drive mid-sized Chrysler H platform model that was in production until 1989 after which it was replaced by the Dodge Spirit.

== 1955–1959: Coronet Lancer, Royal Lancer and Custom Royal Lancer ==
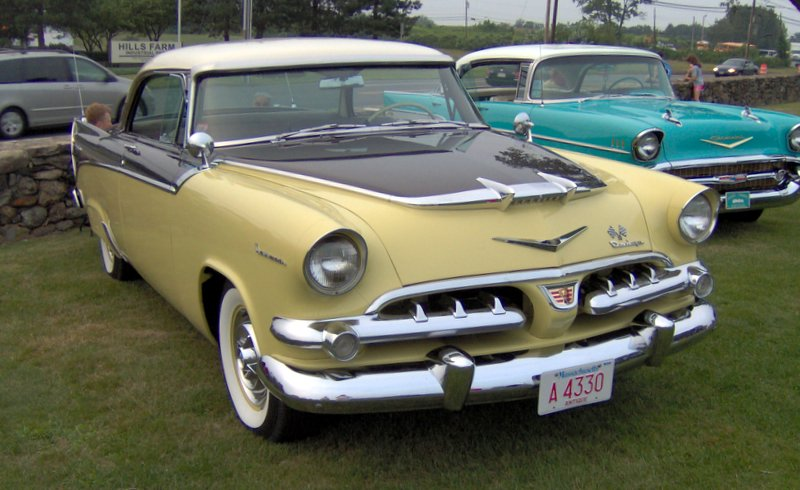
1956 Dodge Custom Royal Lancer

Dodge used the Lancer name from 1955 until 1959 to designate the two- and four-door hardtop (no B-pillar) models in the full-sized Coronet, Royal, and Custom Royal lines. The Custom Royal Lancer was a hardtop only and top-of-the-line model for Dodge in 1959. There were 6,278 two-door and 5,019 four-door hardtops made in 1959. A total of 11,397 Custom Royal Lancers were built.

The Custom Royal Lancer featured a big-block V8 engine, the 361 cu in (5.9 L) producing 305 hp (227 kW; 309 PS). A D-500 option was available, which included a 383 cu in (6.3 L) engine with a single Carter four-barrel carburetor rated at 320 hp (239 kW; 324 PS), as well as a Super D-500 version with dual four-barrel carburetors producing 340 hp (254 kW; 345 PS).

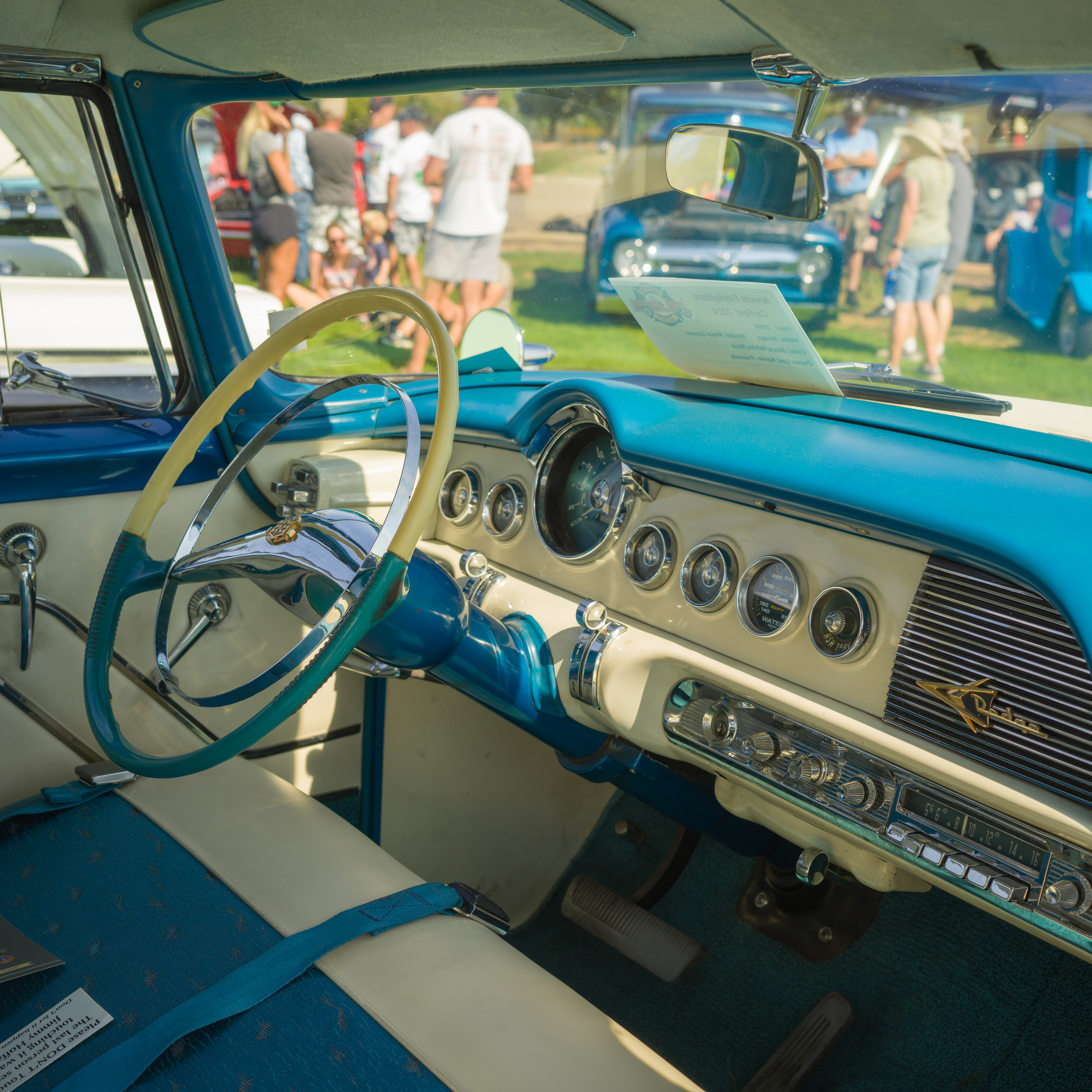
Interior of 1956 Dodge Royal Lancer

The Custom Royal Lancer featured a padded dashboard and steering wheel, Lancer emblems on the fenders, steering wheel, hubcaps, foot-operated windshield wipers, dual-radio antennas, deluxe side trim, and thick chrome eyebrows. Optional equipment included power windows and brakes, air conditioning, and swivel seats. The Lancer designation was dropped for 1960.

== 1961–1962: Lancer ==
1961–1962
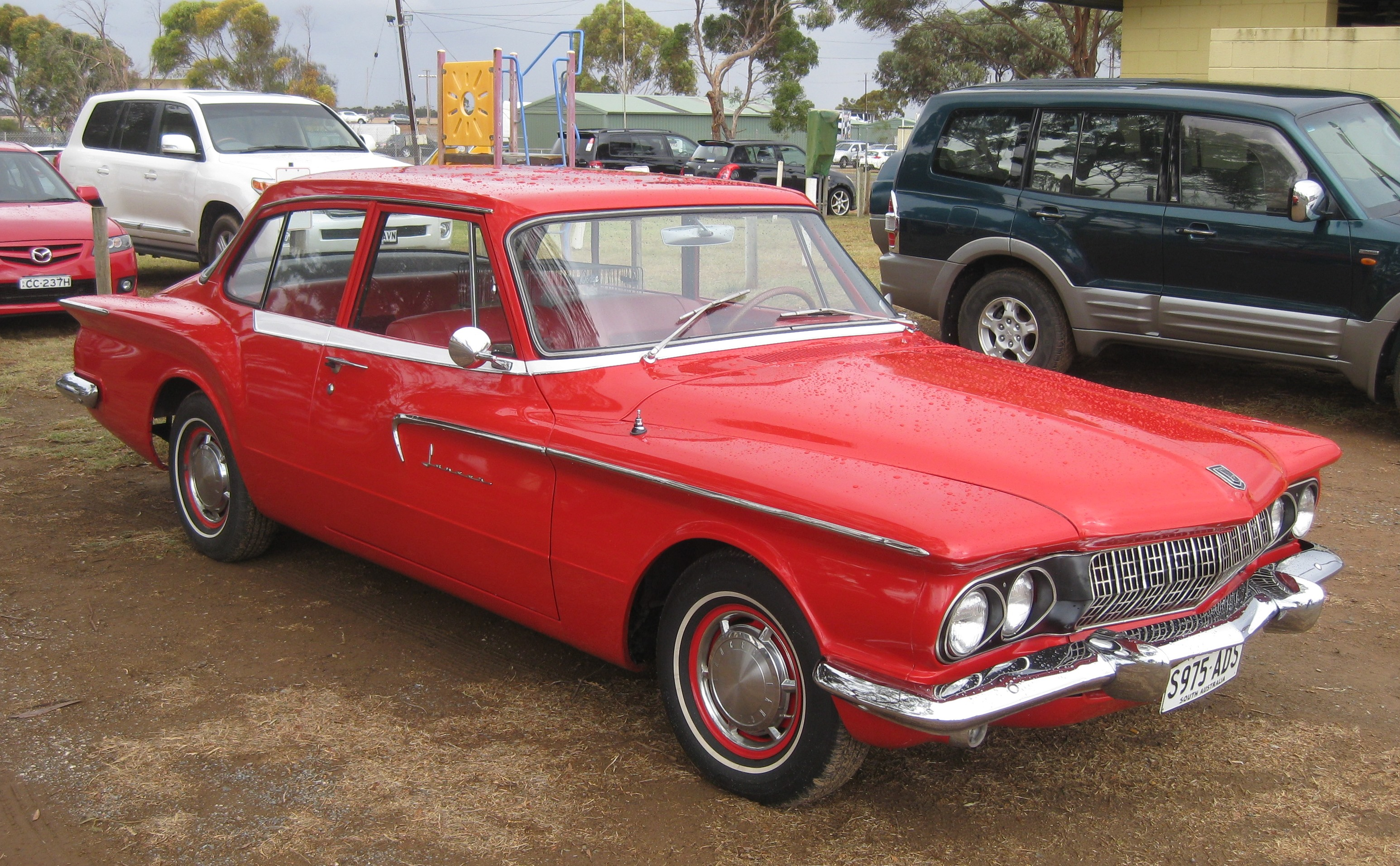
- 1962 Dodge Lancer 170 2-Door Sedan

Overview
- Also called: DeSoto Rebel (South Africa)
- Production: 1960–1962
- Model years: 1961–1962
- Assembly: United States: Los Angeles, California; Newark, Delaware; St. Louis, Missouri; Mexico: Mexico City; Switzerland: AMAG Automobil- und Motoren, Schinznach

Body and chassis
- Class: Compact
- Body style: 2/4-door sedan 2-door hardtop 4-door wagon
- Layout: FR layout
- Platform: A-body
- Related: Plymouth Valiant; Chrysler Valiant

Powertrain
- Engine: 170 cu in (2.8 L) Slant-6; 225 cu in (3.7 L) Slant-6
- Transmission: 3-speed manual 3-speed A904 automatic

Dimensions
- Wheelbase: 106.5 in (2,705 mm)
- Length: 188.8 in (4,796 mm)

Chronology
- Successor: Dodge Dart

For the 1961 model year, Dodge applied the Lancer nameplate to a higher-priced, upmarket badge-engineered version of Chrysler's Valiant compact. The model was introduced when Chrysler officially assigned the Valiant to the Plymouth division for 1961, leaving Dodge dealers without a compact car to sell. All body styles of the Valiant were also available on the Lancer: two- and four-door sedans, two-door hardtop, and a four-door wagon. After 1962, the line was renamed the Dodge Dart.

A survey of 1961 Lancer owners by Popular Mechanics based on a total of 1,023,938-mile (1,647,868 km) miles driven reported that 77.6.2% rated their cars as excellent with handling, comfortable ride, power/performance, and styling as their top likes.

=== Styling & trim ===
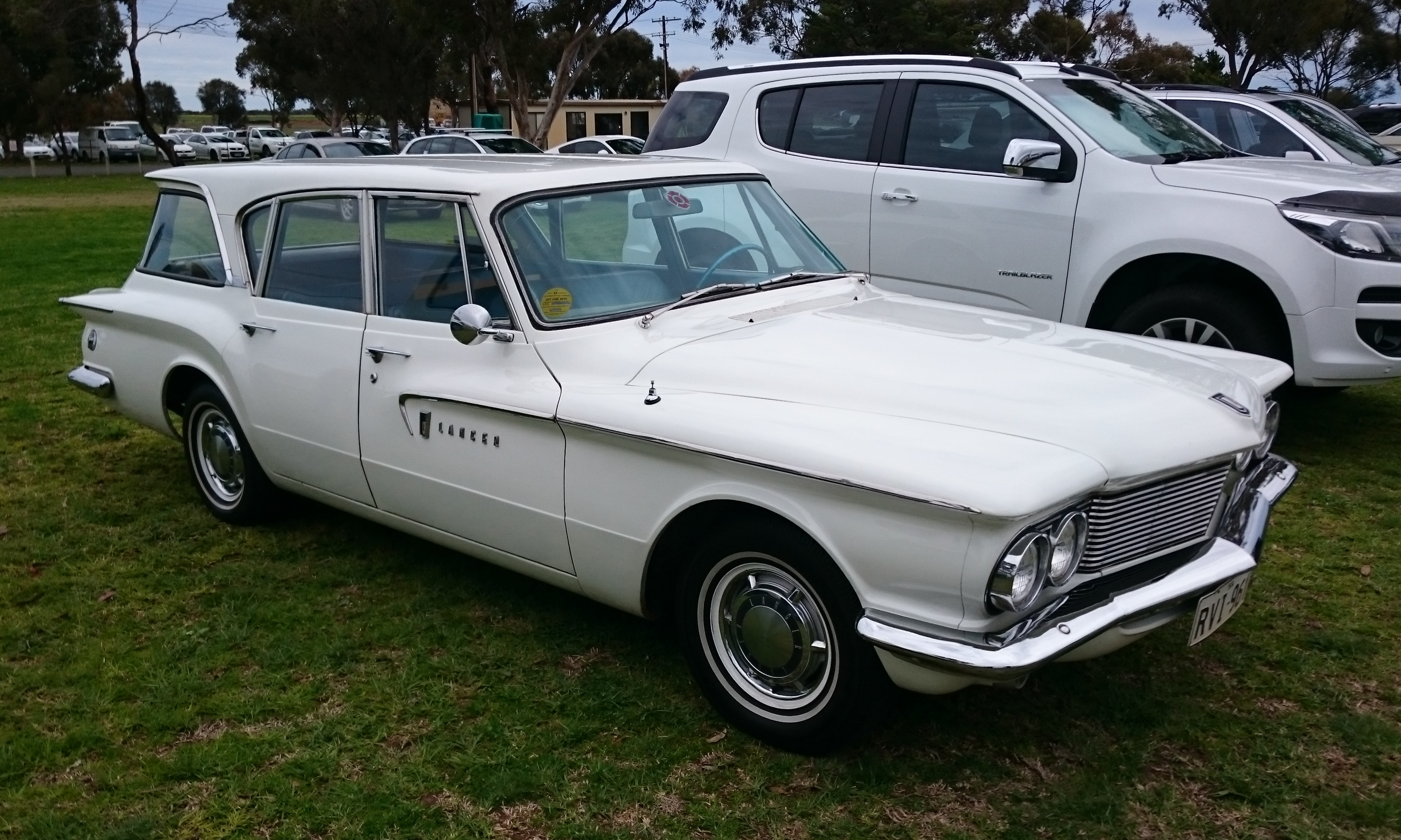
1961 Dodge Lancer 770 Station Wagon

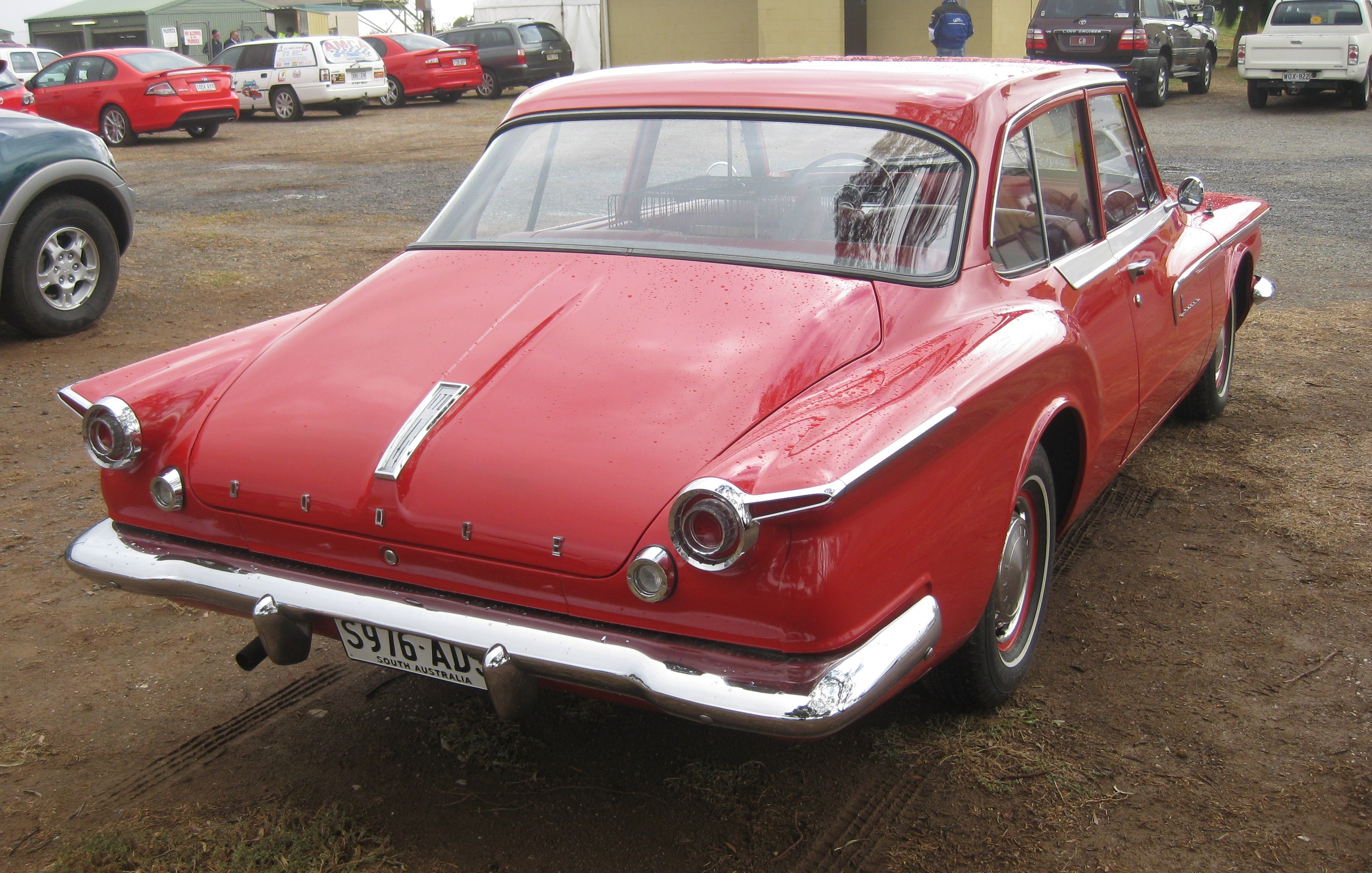
1962 Dodge Lancer 170 2-Door Sedan

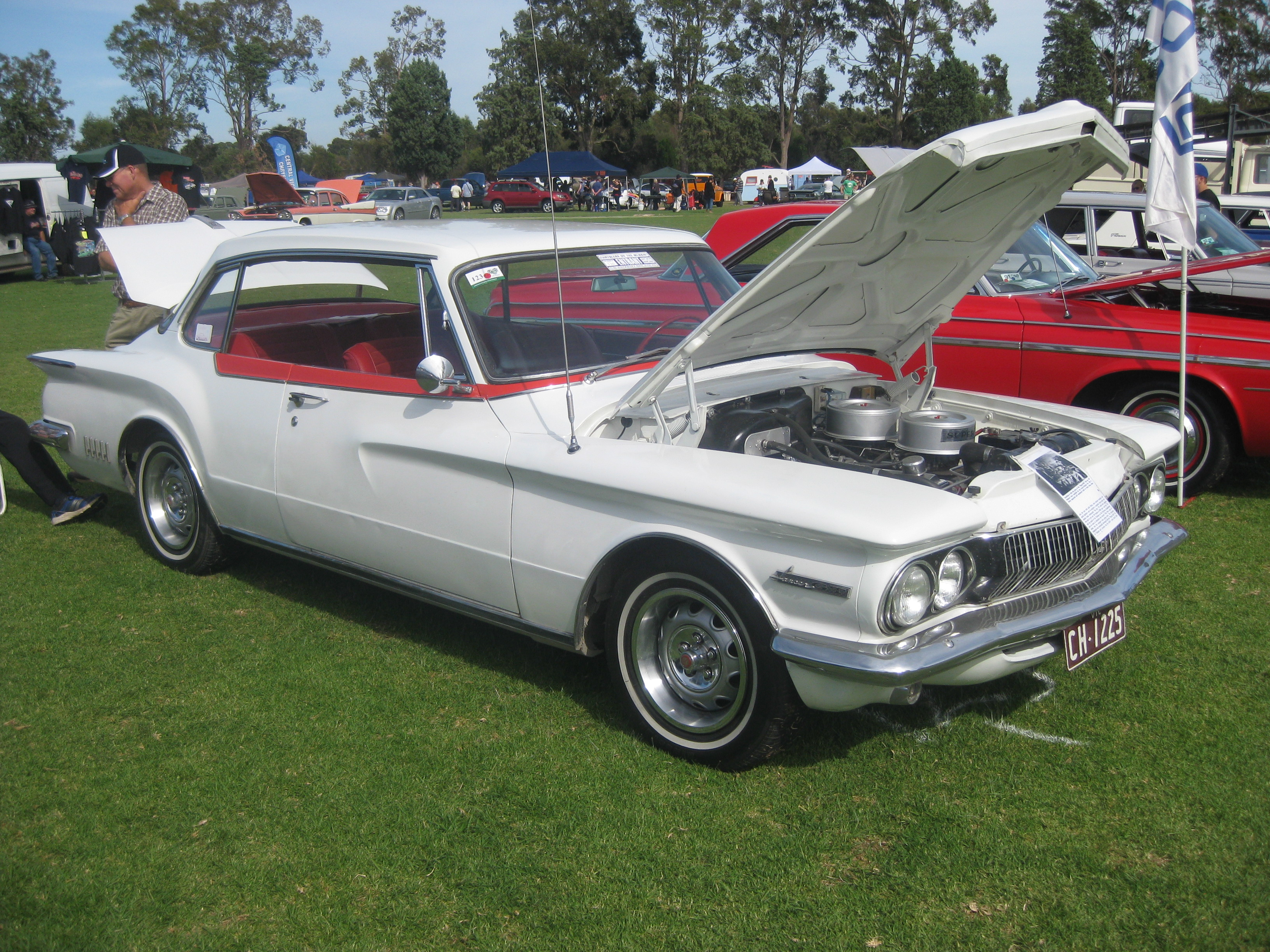
1962 Dodge Lancer GT 2-Door Hardtop

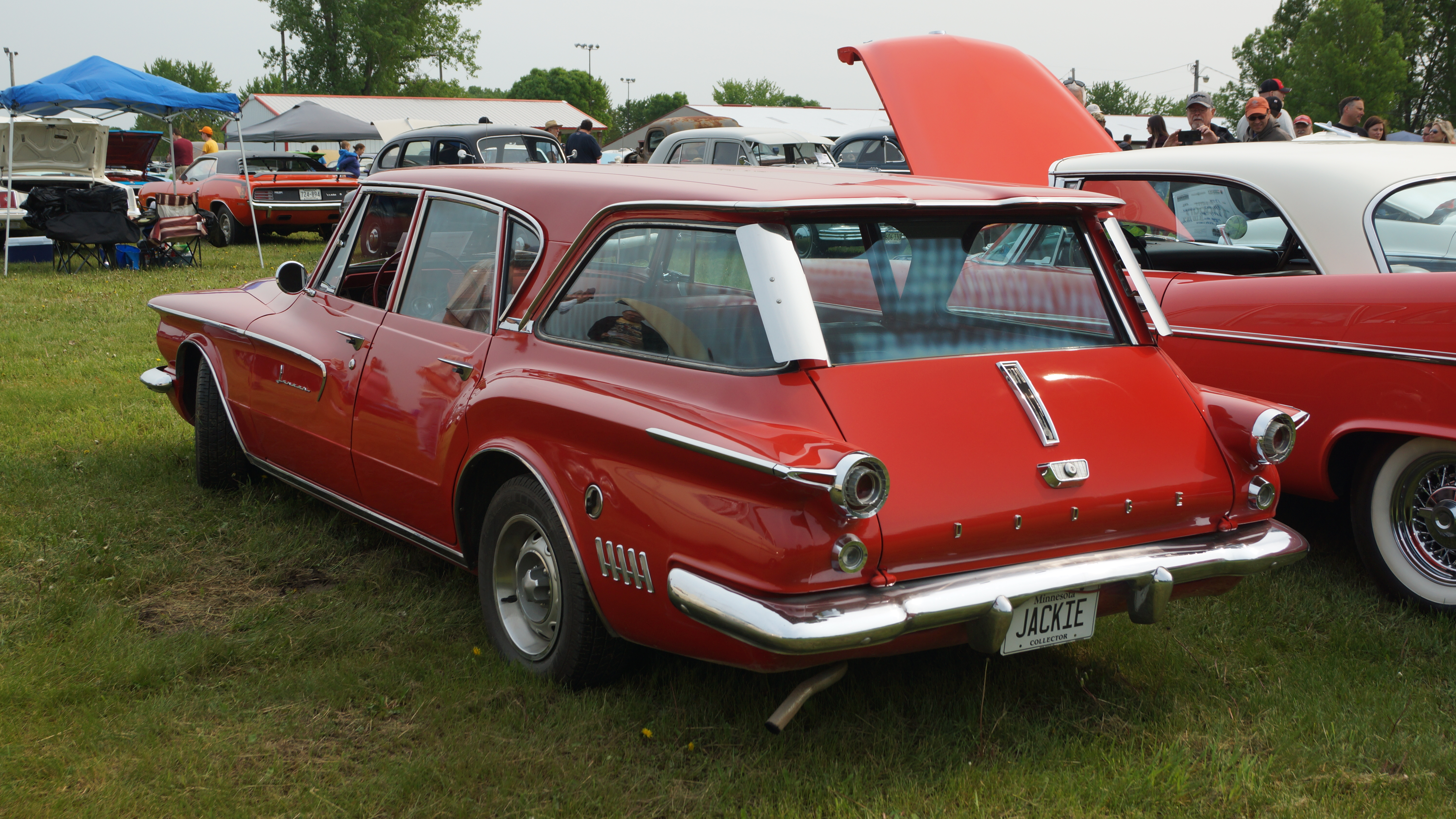
1962 Dodge Lancer 770 station wagon rear view

The Lancer wheelbase and body shell were identical to those of the Valiant, but interior and exterior trim were more upscale for the Lancer. Lancers featured round taillights and a full-width grille, instead of the Valiant's cat's-eye taillights and central grille. For 1961, trim levels were the basic "170" and the premium "770". During 1961, the two-door hardtop was marketed as the "Lancer 770 2-Door Hardtop". For the 1962 model year, the hardtop was marketed as the "GT 2-Door Hardtop" and carried premium trim. Two-tone paint was available and instead of the front bench seat, there were two bucket seats. Also for the 1962 model, "Lancer GT" medallions were mounted on the doors' interior trim panels below the vent window and on the sides of the front fenders just aft of the headlamps. "GT" emblems were placed on the hood, the deck lid, and on the vinyl dash pad. The headlamp bezels and the grille's horizontal slats were blacked-out. The GT also lacked certain ornamentation found on the 170s and 770s such as the "Lancer" door scripts, the slanted chrome hash marks on the lower quarter panel, and the hook-ended stainless steel door-to-fender spears.

=== Powertrains ===
The Lancer used the slant-6 engine. The base engine was the 170 cu in (2.8 L) unit, rated at 101 bhp (75 kW). The optional power package consisted of the larger 225 cu in (3.7 L) engine, rated at 145 bhp (108 kW). After the start of the 1961 model year, a die-cast aluminum version of the 225 engine block was made available. The aluminum 225 weighed 45 lb (20 kg) less than the iron 170 and 80 lb (36 kg) less than the iron 225. Any of the available engines could be equipped at the dealer with Chrysler's Hyper Pak parts kit for a significant power upgrade: the 170 Hyper Pak's published output was 148 bhp (110 kW), while the 225 Hyper Pak's was 196 bhp (146 kW). The Hyper-Pak shaved more than four seconds off the 0 to 60 mph (97 km/h) time versus the standard 225, and was over a second quicker and seven miles per hour faster in the quarter mile. With the Hyper Pak, a 225 Lancer could go from 0 to 60 mph (97 km/h) in 8.6 seconds and turn in a standing quarter-mile time of 16.4 seconds. 1962 cars had the engine and transmission moved for a flatter front floor.

Transmission options were a Chrysler-built A903 three-speed manual with the shifter on the floor in 1961 and on the steering column in 1962, or a pushbutton-operated A904 Torqueflite three-speed automatic.

=== Drag strip & sales competition ===
In the 1962 NHRA Winternationals, Wayne Weihe won the C/FX (Factory Experimental) class with a Hyper-Pak-equipped Lancer, clocking a 15.67 E.T. Although the bigger Dodges were beginning to appear at drag strips around the country, the "Golden Lancer" of Dode Martin and Jim Nelson was one of the fastest compacts on the strips in 1962. The engine was a 413 cu in (6.77 liters) Chrysler RB V8 engine modified by the Chrysler engineers' "Ramchargers" racing team. The Golden Lancer raced successfully in A/FX class and could do the quarter-mile in 12.68 seconds at 113 mph (182 km/h).

Lancer sales did not meet expectations and sold about half as well as the Valiant. As a late part of the total redesign of Dodge's compact car for 1963, the Lancer name was discontinued. Dodge compacts for 1963 through 1976 were named Dart, a name that had previously been assigned to a larger car produced by Dodge from 1960 through 1962.

=== South African market ===
In South Africa, a right hand drive version of the Lancer was sold from 1961 through 1963, badged as the DeSoto Rebel not long after the DeSoto name was discontinued in the U.S. All were equipped with the 170 cu in (2.8 L) Slant 6 engine, and most had the three-speed manual transmission. As with the Australian RV1 and SV1 Valiants, the DeSoto Rebel used the instrument cluster from the U.S. 1961 Plymouth Valiant. White reflectors were mounted to the front bumper, in compliance with South African vehicle equipment regulations.

The Rebel name was re-introduced by Chrysler South Africa in 1967 as the economy-priced "Valiant Rebel".

== 1985–1989: Lancer ==
1985–1989
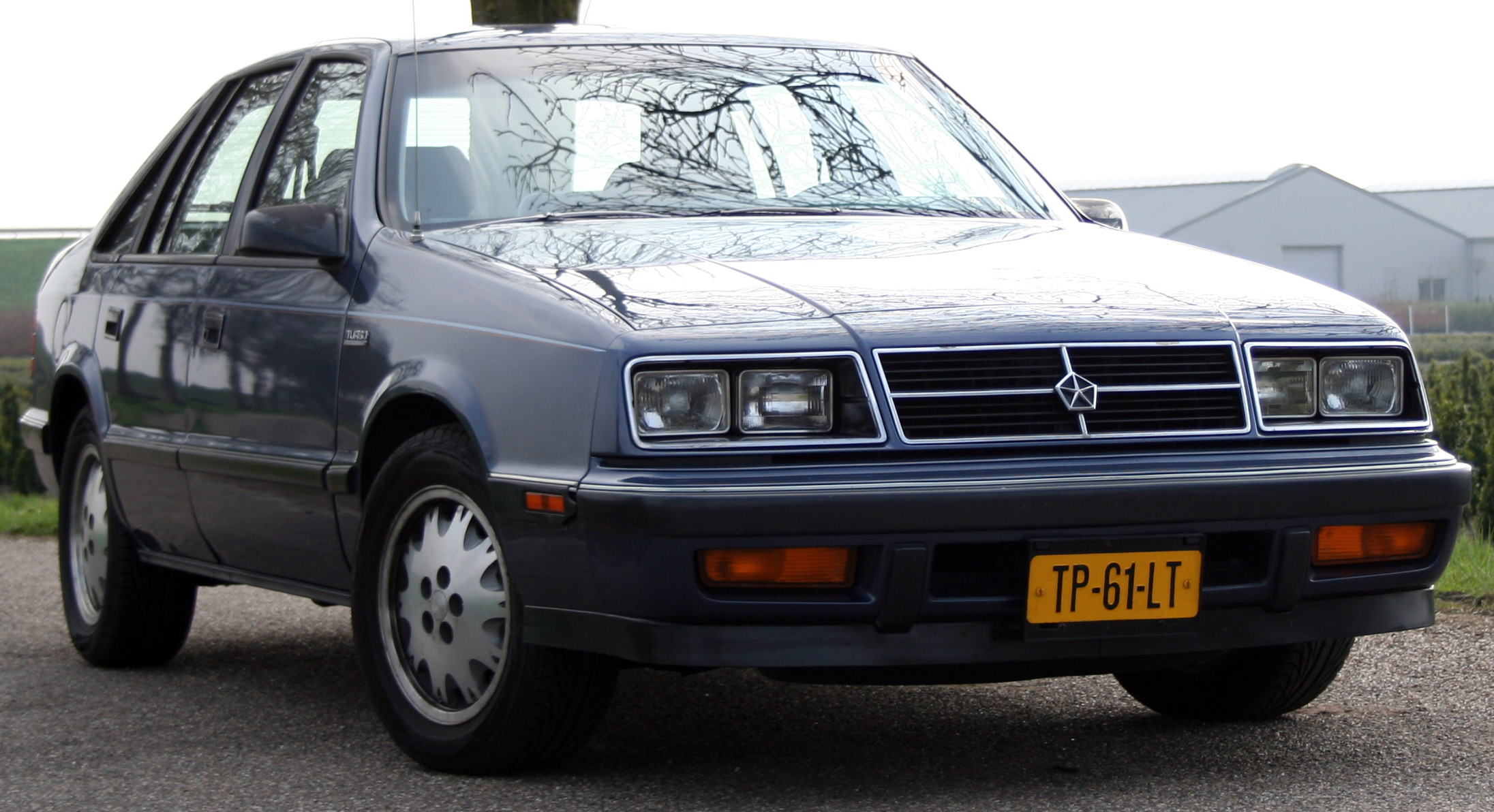
- 1988 Dodge Lancer ES Turbo

Overview
- Production: August 1984–April 7, 1989
- Model years: 1985–1989
- Assembly: Sterling Heights, Michigan, United States

Body and chassis
- Class: Mid-size
- Body style: 5-door hatchback
- Layout: Transverse front-engine, front-wheel drive
- Platform: H-body
- Related: Chrysler LeBaron GTS; Chrysler LeBaron; Chrysler GTS (Europe); Shelby Lancer

Powertrain
- Engine: 2.2 L (134 cu in) K I4; 2.2 L (134 cu in) Turbo I I4; 2.2 L (134 cu in) Turbo II I4; 2.5 L (153 cu in) K I4
- Transmission: 5-speed manual 3-speed A413 automatic

Dimensions
- Wheelbase: 103.1 in (2,619 mm)
- Length: 180.4 in (4,582 mm)
- Width: 68.3 in (1,735 mm)
- Height: 53 in (1,346 mm)

The Dodge Lancer was re-introduced in 1985 as a mid-sized 5-door hatchback. It was a rebadged version of the Chrysler LeBaron GTS and was based on the Chrysler H platform, a stretched version of the Chrysler K platform. The Lancer eventually slotted between the Aries and the 600. All Lancers were built in Sterling Heights, Michigan. Production ended on April 7, 1989, and the market position was replaced by the Spirit.

=== Shelby Lancer ===
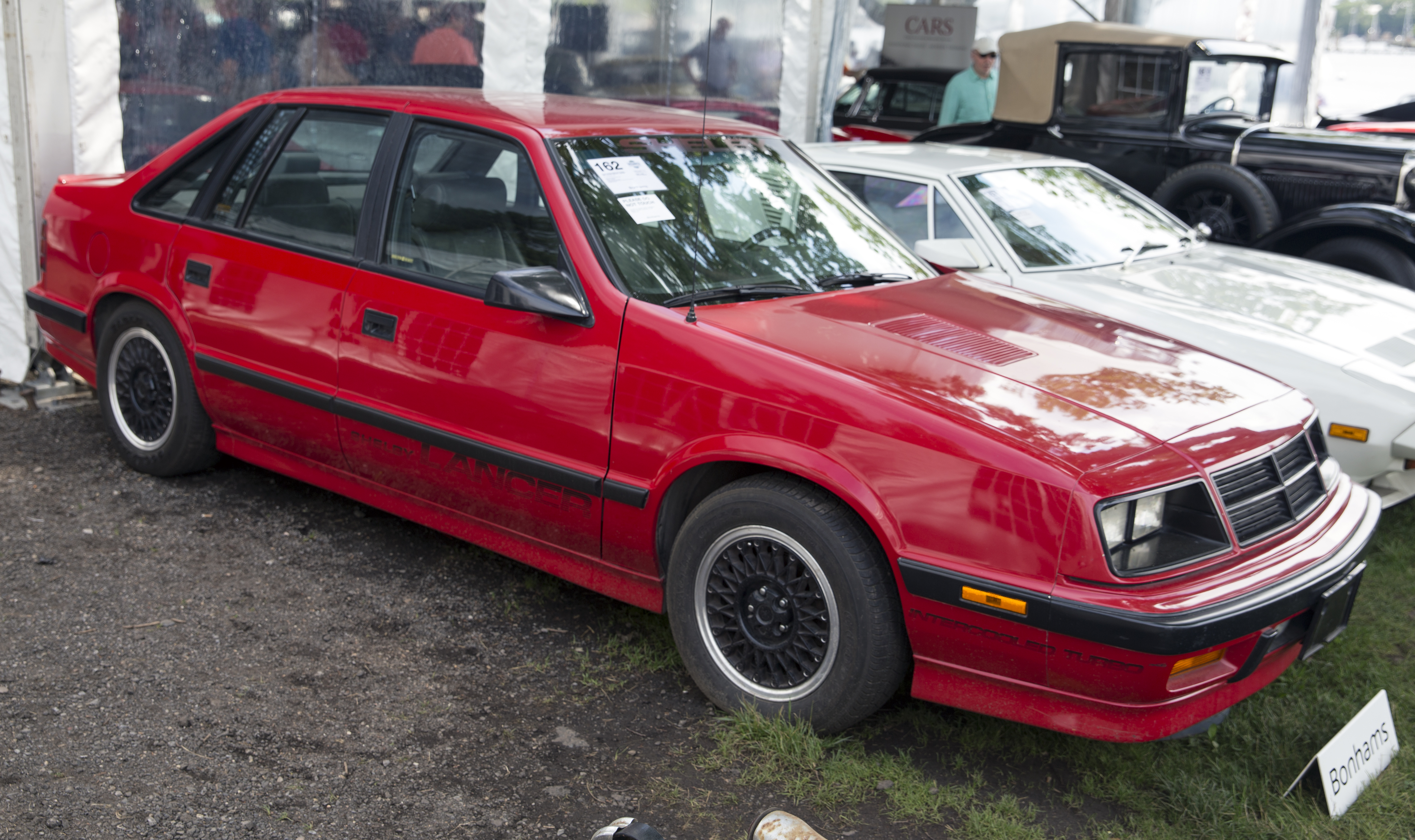
1987 Shelby Lancer

For the 1987 model year, Shelby Automobiles in Whittier, California, built a modified version sold as the Shelby Lancer. It was titled as a Shelby rather than a Dodge, and is distinct from the Dodge Lancer Shelby that Dodge built for 1988 and 1989. An announced 800 units were produced, all in Graphic Red, with half featuring a 5-speed manual transmission and cloth seats while the other half were equipped with a 3-speed automatic transmission and leather upholstery. It listed for $16,995, compared with $11,250 for a standard Lancer ES.

Along with Shelby-themed trim changes, the cars included a modified suspension with Monroe gas-charged struts and shocks, upgraded sway bars, and lowered springs, as well as four-wheel disc brakes and a Pioneer CD player, an unusual feature for the time. The Shelby Lancer is powered by a 2.2 L Turbo I engine converted to Turbo II specifications with an intercooler, producing 175 hp (130 kW) and 175 lb⋅ft (237 N⋅m) of torque. Shelby claimed 0–60 mph (97 km/h) in 7.7 seconds, and period tests recorded between 7.2 and 8.0 seconds.

=== Dodge Lancer Shelby ===
Dodge took over for the 1988 model year, building the car in the same Sterling Heights plant as regular Lancers and selling it as the Dodge Lancer Shelby, an option package on the Lancer ES. Unlike the 1987 Shelby Lancer, it was not numbered or titled as a Shelby.

The Dodge Lancer Shelby kept much of the 1987 car's appearance, with some omissions. It used the Lancer ES sport handling suspension in place of the Shelby-modified setup, and the rear disc brakes were dropped in favor of the regular Lancer's rear drums. The Shelby wheels, steering wheel, and numbered dash plaque were not carried over, and the Pioneer CD player was replaced by Chrysler's Infinity II system. While the 1987 models were only available in red, the 1988 and 1989 models added a choice of white or black. The base price was $16,530.

The manual-transmission version used an intercooled Turbo II engine rated at 174 hp (130 kW), while the automatic variant was equipped with the non-intercooled 146 hp (109 kW) Turbo I. Car and Driver tested a 1988 car in June 1988 and recorded 0–60 mph in 7.2 seconds. Dodge built 279 Lancer Shelbys in 1988 and 208 in 1989, for a total of 487 units.

=== European market ===
In April 1988, Chrysler started offering some models on the European market. One of them was the "Chrysler GTS", a rebadged version of the Dodge Lancer ES. Due to European vehicle regulations, the exterior appearance was slightly different. The rear turn signals were amber rather than red, the front sidemarkers and the centre high mount stop lamp (CHMSL) were blanked off, small round repeaters were installed into the front fenders and the sideview mirrors were of spring-hinged rather than rigid design. The engine options included the naturally aspirated 2.2 L (134 cu in) Four, and a turbocharged version of the same engine. From 1989 on, the 2.5 L (153 cu in) Four became available with or without a turbocharger. The 2.2 engine was dropped, except for the Turbo II version that was standard equipment on the Chrysler GTS Shelby, the European sibling of the Dodge Lancer Shelby. A five-speed manual gearbox was standard, with a three-speed automatic transmission as an extra-cost option. The GTS Shelby came only with a manual transmission; a 1989 Dutch-language brochure lists it at 130 kW (174 hp) with a top speed of 208 km/h (129 mph). The Chrysler GTS had few buyers in Europe; the competition was too hard. Even the comparatively low prices could not help, and sales figures were very low. By the end of 1989, the GTS was replaced by the Saratoga.

Production Figures:

Dodge Lancer Production Figures
	Hatchback	Shelby	Yearly Total
1985	45,853	-	45,853
1986	51,897	-	51,897
1987	26,569	-	26,569
1988	9,064	279	9,343
1989	2,585	208	2,793
Total	135,968	487	136,455
