= E95 =

E95 may refer to:

- King's Indian Defense, Encyclopaedia of Chess Openings code
- An ethanol fuel mixture used in modified diesel engines. The fuel's commercial name is ED95
- The FAA location identifier for Benson Municipal Airport (Arizona).
- European route E95, a road connecting St Petersburg in Russia and Merzifon in Turkey passing through Belarus and Ukraine
- Bantan Renraku Road, route E95 in Japan.
