= Benson High School (Minnesota) =

Coordinates: 45.3202778°N 95.5977778°W

- 1400 Montana Avenue; Benson, Minnesota 56215; United States

Information
- Type: Public
- Established: 1890
- School district: Benson Public Schools
- Superintendent: Dennis Laumeyer
- Principal: Michael Knutson
- Teaching staff: 26.44 (on FTE basis)
- Grades: 6 to 12
- Enrollment: 334 (2024-2025)
- Student to teacher ratio: 12.63
- Colors: Maroon and Gold
- Athletics conference: MSHSL Region 3A
- Sports: Cross Country, Football, Tennis (boys and girls), Volleyball, Hockey (boys and girls), Basketball (boys and girls), Gymnastics, Wrestling, Baseball, Softball, Golf (boys and girls), Track and Field (boys and girls), Clay Target
- Team name: Braves, Storm (hockey)
- Website: Benson High School

Benson High School is a public high school located in Benson, Minnesota. The school educates about 400 students in grades 6 to 12 in the Benson Public Schools District. Others schools in Benson include Northside Elementary School (PK-5).

== Alumni ==
- Henry G. Young, state legislator
- Tiny Moving Parts - Rock band
