= KBBB =

KBBB may refer to:

- Benson Municipal Airport (Minnesota), an airport in Benson, Minnesota with the ICAO code KBBB
- KBBB (FM), a radio station (102.5 FM) licensed to serve Bay City, Texas, United States
- KMHK, a radio station (103.7 FM) licensed to Billings, Montana, United States, which held the call sign KBBB from 1996 to 2010
