= Froshaug =

Froshaug is a surname. Notable people with this surname include:

- Anthony Froshaug (1920–1984), English typographer
- Saxe J. Froshaug (1867–1916), American politician

== See also ==
- Mats Frøshaug (born 1988), Norwegian ice hockey player
