= Tiny Moving Parts =

American emo band

- Origin: Benson, Minnesota
- Genres: Midwest emo; screamo; math rock; indie rock; post-hardcore
- Years active: 2008–present
- Labels: Hopeless; Kind of Like; Triple Crown; Big Scary Monsters
- Members: Dylan Mattheisen; William Chevalier; Matthew Chevalier
- Website: Bandcamp

Tiny Moving Parts is an American emo band from Benson, Minnesota. Formed by brothers William and Matthew Chevalier, and their cousin Dylan Mattheisen, the band has released seven studio albums since their 2008 formation in junior high. Their most recent album Deep in the Blue was self-released on November 15, 2024.

== History ==
Tiny Moving Parts is a self-described family band consisting of brothers William Chevalier (drums) and Matthew Chevalier (bass, vocals), and their cousin Dylan Mattheisen (guitar, vocals) who were also all students at Benson High School. The trio started playing together in junior high and have been together since then. After releasing their first demo album Waves Rise, Waves Recede, the Ocean Is Full of Waves, they followed up with a second, Moving to Antarctica on June 19, 2010. Their first official studio album, This Couch Is Long & Full of Friendship, was released through Kind of Like Records on January 13, 2013. On June 12, "Clouds Above My Head" was released as a free download. On July 9, the album was released physically. Later in the month, the group toured alongside The Front Bottoms, Frameworks and Hostage Calm.

In March 2014, the group performed with Japanther. Later that month, the band signed to Triple Crown Records. In April and May, the group went on tour with Frameworks, Gates and Free Throw. In June, the group supported Modern Baseball on their headlining US tour. On July 9, "Always Focused" was made available for streaming. On September 9, they released their second studio album, Pleasant Living. In July and August, the group supported State Champs on their headlining US tour, dubbed The Shot Boys of Summer Tour. Between October and December, the group supported Modern Baseball on their headlining US tour. In March 2016, they announced that their third studio album, Celebrate, will be released on May 20, 2016. In the same announcement, they released the first single from Celebrate entitled "Happy Birthday". The band went on a spring 2016 tour supporting The Wonder Years, Letlive and Microwave. The group's next album, Swell, was released on January 26, 2018. On June 26, 2019, the band signed to Hopeless Records and released the first single from their upcoming fifth studio album breathe. breathe was released on September 13, 2019. On August 26, 2022 Tiny Moving Parts independently released their self-titled sixth studio album. On October 1, 2024, the band announced a new album Deep in the Blue alongside a new single "Before I Go". Deep in the Blue was released on November 15, 2024.

=== Controversy ===
On February 28, 2019, an anonymous Twitter user accused Mattheisen of sexual assault. On March 7, Mattheisen released a statement on the band's Facebook to acknowledge the accusations and issued an apology to the victim. He further explained he reached out to the victim, offering to work with an independent mediator so she could have "a space to safely share their story while retaining privacy and confidentiality." The woman declined. In the same post, Mattheisen announced the band would be donating all the proceeds for their upcoming tour to charities, as well as committing to seeking therapy.

== Band members ==
- Dylan Mattheisen – lead vocals, guitar
- William "Bill" Chevalier – drums
- Matthew Chevalier – bass guitar, backing vocals

== Discography ==
Studio albums

- This Couch Is Long & Full of Friendship (Kind of Like Records, 2013)
- Pleasant Living (Triple Crown Records, 2014)
- Celebrate (Triple Crown Records, Big Scary Monsters(UK/Europe), 2016)
- Swell (Triple Crown Records, Big Scary Monsters(UK/Europe), 2018)
- Breathe (Hopeless Records, 2019)
- Tiny Moving Parts (self-released, 2022)
- Deep in the Blue (self-released, 2024)

Extended plays

- The Dan Martin Split w/ Victor Shores (2011)
- 7" Old Maid/Coffee with Tom (2012)
- Tiny Moving Parts/Old Gray Split (2014)
- For the Sake of Brevity / Fish Bowl (2019)

Demo albums

- Waves Rise, Waves Recede, the Ocean Is Full of Waves (self-released, 2008)
- Moving to Antarctica (self-released, 2010)

Singles

- You Lost Me/Guardians (2020)
- Life Jacket (2021)

== Videography ==
- "Waterbed" (2012) Directed by Kevin Ackley
- "Clouds Above My Head" (2013) Directed by Falcon Gott & TMP
- "Vacation Bible School" (2013) Directed by Falcon Gott
- "Fair Trade" (2014) Directed by Tiny Moving Parts
- "Always Focused" (2014) Directed by Kyle Thrash
- "Entrances and Exits" (2014) Directed by Tiny Moving Parts
- "Sundress" (2015)
- "Headache" (2016) Directed by Kyle Thrash
- "Common Cold" (2016) Directed by Kyle Thrash
- "Caution" (2017) Directed by John Komar
- "Applause" (2018) Directed by Samuel Halleen
- "Feel Alive" (2018) Directed by John Komar
- "For the Sake of Brevity" (2019) Directed by Brendan Lauer
- "Medicine" (2019) Directed by Lewis Cater
- "Bloody Nose" (2019) Directed by Michael Herrick
- "Vertebrae" (2019) Directed by Max Moore
- "Life Jacket" (2021)
