= Breathe (Tiny Moving Parts album) =

Studio album by Tiny Moving Parts
- Released: September 13, 2019
- Genres: Math rock; pop punk; emo revival
- Length: 31:14
- Label: Hopeless
- Producers: Greg Lindholm, John Fields

Tiny Moving Parts chronology
| Swell (2018) | Breathe (2019) |

Singles from Breathe
- 1. "Medicine" Released: June 25, 2019

Breathe (stylised as breathe) is the fifth studio album by American rock trio Tiny Moving Parts. It was released on September 13, 2019 through Hopeless Records, and is their only album to be released on the label.

== Critical reception ==
Professional ratings
Aggregate scores
| Source | Rating |
|---|---|
| Metacritic | 79/100 |
Review scores
| Source | Rating |
| Exclaim! | 9/10 |
| Kerrang! | 4/5 stars |
| Sputnikmusic | 3.5/5 stars |

Breathe was met with generally favorable reviews from critics. At Metacritic, which assigns a weighted average rating out of 100 to reviews from mainstream publications, this release received an average score of 79, based on 4 reviews.

== Track listing ==
All tracks are written by Tiny Moving Parts.

| No. | Title | Length |
|---|---|---|
| 1. | "The Midwest Sky" | 3:10 |
| 2. | "Light Bulb" | 2:56 |
| 3. | "Medicine" | 3:11 |
| 4. | "Icicles" | 3:19 |
| 5. | "Vertebrae" | 3:36 |
| 6. | "Polar Bear" | 2:43 |
| 7. | "Bloody Nose" | 2:48 |
| 8. | "Soft Spot" | 3:23 |
| 9. | "I Can't Shake" | 2:44 |
| 10. | "Hallmark" | 3:19 |
| Total length: | | 31:14 |

== Charts ==
| Chart | Peak position |
|---|---|
| US Heatseekers Albums (Billboard) | 3 |
| US Independent Albums (Billboard) | 8 |
