= Henry G. Young =

American lawyer and politician (1891–1956)

Henry G. Young (January 15, 1891 – March 7, 1956) was an American lawyer and politician.

Young was born on a farm in Arctander Township, Kandiyohi County, Minnesota and graduated from Benson High School in Benson, Minnesota. He served in the Minnesota National Guard and in the United States Army during World War I. Young received his law degree from University of Minnesota Law School in 1916. He moved to Willmar, Minnesota in 1918. He then moved to Minneapolis, Minnesota, in 1928 with his wife and family and practiced law in Minneapolis. He had served on the Willmar, Minnesota School Board. He also served as the Willmar city attorney and municipal court judge. Young served in the Minnesota House of Representatives from 1937 to 1940 and in the Minnesota Senate from 1941 to 1946. Young died at the United States Veterans Hospital in Minneapolis and he was buried in Benson, Minnesota.
