= Benson, Minnesota =

City in Minnesota, United States

Benson
- City
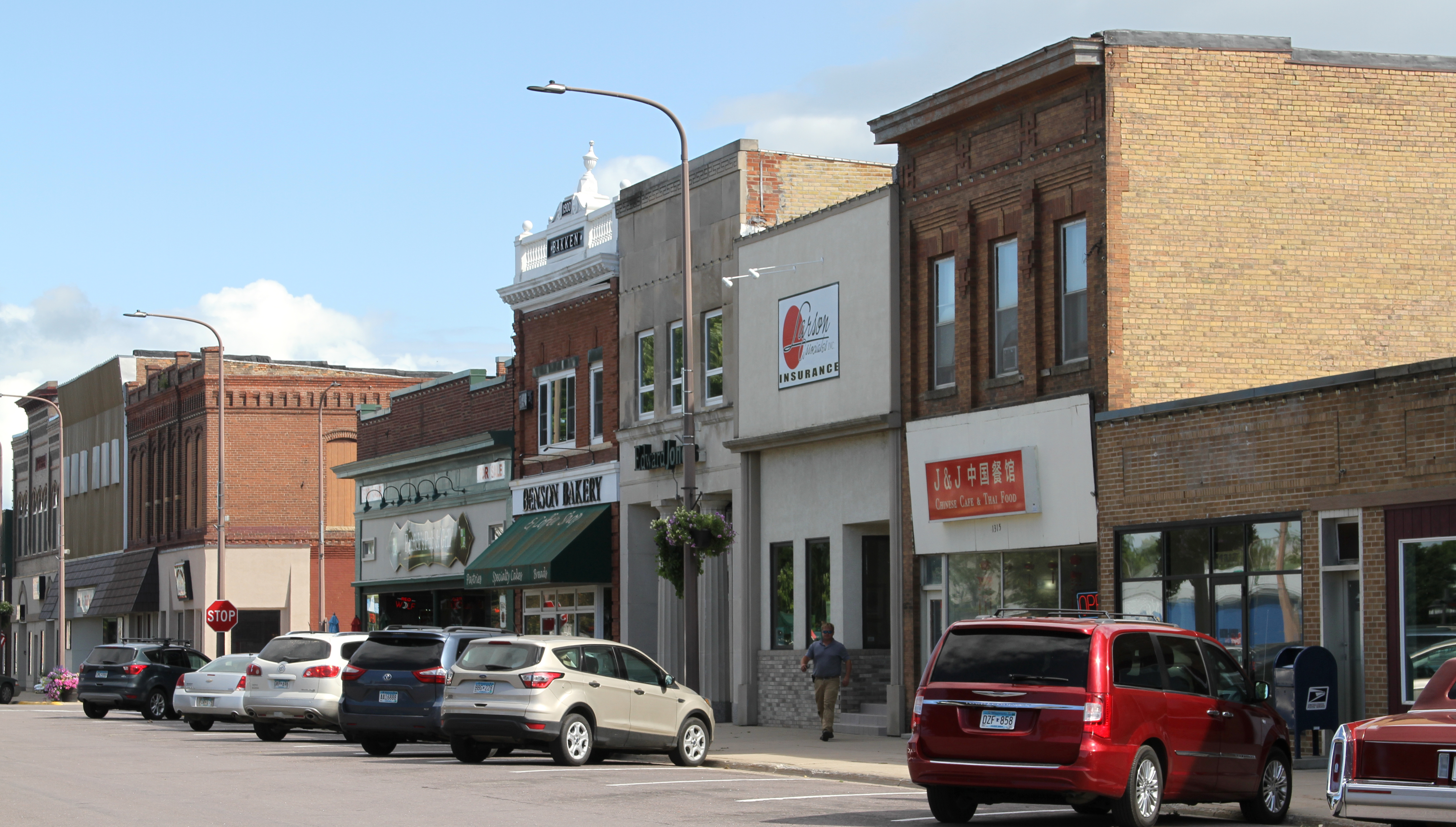
- Businesses on Pacific Avenue.

- Location of Benson within Swift County, Minnesota
- Coordinates: 45°18′55″N 95°36′21″W
- Country: United States
- State: Minnesota
- County: Swift

Area
  - Total: 3.12 sq mi (8.08 km^{2})
  - Land: 3.10 sq mi (8.03 km^{2})
  - Water: 0.019 sq mi (0.05 km^{2})
- Elevation: 1,040 ft (320 m)

Population (2020)
  - Total: 3,480
  - Density: 1,122.9/sq mi (433.55/km^{2})
- Time zone: UTC-6 (Central (CST))
  - Summer (DST): UTC-5 (CDT)
- ZIP code: 56215
- Area code: 320
- FIPS code: 27-05212
- GNIS feature ID: 2394138
- Website: https://cityofbensonmn.gov/

Benson is a city in Swift County, Minnesota, United States, along the Chippewa River. The population was 3,480 at the 2020 census. It is the county seat.

== History ==
Benson was platted in 1870 when the railroad was extended to that point. As the end of the tracks, Benson became a lively trading center. Benson was the market for a 100-mile area in almost all directions.

The city was named for Ben H. Benson, a Norwegian settler. Benson was incorporated as a city in 1908.

The town's early history included many tragedies, such as an 1872 smallpox epidemic, an 1876 grasshopper plague, and a fire in 1880 that wiped out a whole city block.

In 1869, the first general store in Benson was established. A post office has been in operation at Benson since 1870. The Benson Public Library was established in 1911 after a generous donation. In 1912, the Swift County Hospital was built, originally housing 19 patients. Benson's first one-room schoolhouse still stands as a historic site in Ambush Park and is open to the public. The current schools were established in 1890 (Benson High School]) and 1958 (Northside Elementary School).

== Geography ==
According to the United States Census Bureau, Benson has an area of 3.02 square miles (7.82 km^{2}); 3.00 square miles (7.77 km^{2}) is land and 0.02 square miles (0.05 km^{2}) is water.

U.S. Highway 12 and Minnesota State Highways 9 and 29 are three of the main routes in the city.

=== Climate ===
Climate data for Benson, Minnesota, 1991–2020 normals, extremes 1945–present
Month	Jan	Feb	Mar	Apr	May	Jun	Jul	Aug	Sep	Oct	Nov	Dec	Year
Record high °F (°C)	63 (17)	61 (16)	80 (27)	97 (36)	99 (37)	104 (40)	103 (39)	103 (39)	101 (38)	93 (34)	81 (27)	60 (16)	104 (40)
Mean maximum °F (°C)	41.3 (5.2)	45.1 (7.3)	62.2 (16.8)	79.6 (26.4)	89.7 (32.1)	93.4 (34.1)	93.6 (34.2)	91.8 (33.2)	88.8 (31.6)	82.0 (27.8)	62.3 (16.8)	44.2 (6.8)	96.2 (35.7)
Mean daily maximum °F (°C)	21.2 (−6.0)	26.0 (−3.3)	39.1 (3.9)	55.7 (13.2)	69.4 (20.8)	79.3 (26.3)	83.3 (28.5)	80.9 (27.2)	73.8 (23.2)	58.5 (14.7)	40.8 (4.9)	26.5 (−3.1)	54.5 (12.5)
Daily mean °F (°C)	11.0 (−11.7)	15.4 (−9.2)	28.7 (−1.8)	44.1 (6.7)	57.6 (14.2)	68.1 (20.1)	72.2 (22.3)	69.7 (20.9)	61.6 (16.4)	46.8 (8.2)	31.2 (−0.4)	17.4 (−8.1)	43.7 (6.5)
Mean daily minimum °F (°C)	0.8 (−17.3)	4.8 (−15.1)	18.4 (−7.6)	32.5 (0.3)	45.9 (7.7)	57.0 (13.9)	61.0 (16.1)	58.5 (14.7)	49.4 (9.7)	35.2 (1.8)	21.5 (−5.8)	8.3 (−13.2)	32.8 (0.4)
Mean minimum °F (°C)	−19.9 (−28.8)	—	−4.6 (−20.3)	17.6 (−8.0)	31.5 (−0.3)	44.7 (7.1)	50.4 (10.2)	46.7 (8.2)	33.5 (0.8)	20.0 (−6.7)	2.9 (−16.2)	−13.2 (−25.1)	−22.7 (−30.4)
Record low °F (°C)	−35 (−37)	−35 (−37)	−27 (−33)	0 (−18)	20 (−7)	34 (1)	41 (5)	36 (2)	21 (−6)	10 (−12)	−21 (−29)	−28 (−33)	−35 (−37)
Average precipitation inches (mm)	0.74 (19)	0.81 (21)	1.50 (38)	2.59 (66)	3.34 (85)	4.10 (104)	4.00 (102)	3.77 (96)	2.75 (70)	2.45 (62)	1.24 (31)	0.82 (21)	28.11 (715)
Average snowfall inches (cm)	8.3 (21)	8.5 (22)	7.1 (18)	4.2 (11)	0.1 (0.25)	0.0 (0.0)	0.0 (0.0)	0.0 (0.0)	0.0 (0.0)	0.3 (0.76)	5.7 (14)	8.4 (21)	42.6 (108.01)
Average extreme snow depth inches (cm)	9.9 (25)	11.4 (29)	10.7 (27)	3.3 (8.4)	0.1 (0.25)	0.0 (0.0)	0.0 (0.0)	0.0 (0.0)	0.0 (0.0)	0.3 (0.76)	4.0 (10)	7.4 (19)	14.4 (37)
Average precipitation days (≥ 0.01 in)	6.8	6.0	7.0	8.7	11.0	12.3	9.8	9.5	8.9	9.0	5.5	6.6	101.1
Average snowy days (≥ 0.1 in)	5.6	4.8	3.3	1.3	0.0	0.0	0.0	0.0	0.0	0.3	2.3	5.3	22.9
Source 1: NOAA
Source 2: National Weather Service

== Demographics ==
Historical population
Census	Pop.	Note	%±
1880	456		—
1890	877		92.3%
1900	1,525		73.9%
1910	1,677		10.0%
1920	2,111		25.9%
1930	2,095		−0.8%
1940	2,729		30.3%
1950	3,398		24.5%
1960	3,678		8.2%
1970	3,484		−5.3%
1980	3,656		4.9%
1990	3,235		−11.5%
2000	3,376		4.4%
2010	3,240		−4.0%
2020	3,480		7.4%
U.S. Decennial Census

=== 2020 census ===
As of the 2020 census, Benson had a population of 3,480. The median age was 43.5 years. 22.4% of residents were under the age of 18 and 26.2% of residents were 65 years of age or older. For every 100 females there were 92.1 males, and for every 100 females age 18 and over there were 86.0 males age 18 and over.

0.0% of residents lived in urban areas, while 100.0% lived in rural areas.

There were 1,498 households in Benson, of which 25.3% had children under the age of 18 living in them. Of all households, 40.2% were married-couple households, 20.4% were households with a male householder and no spouse or partner present, and 32.1% were households with a female householder and no spouse or partner present. About 38.7% of all households were made up of individuals and 18.8% had someone living alone who was 65 years of age or older.

There were 1,628 housing units, of which 8.0% were vacant. The homeowner vacancy rate was 3.1% and the rental vacancy rate was 9.2%.

Racial composition as of the 2020 census
Race	Number	Percent
White	3,144	90.3%
Black or African American	59	1.7%
American Indian and Alaska Native	15	0.4%
Asian	40	1.1%
Native Hawaiian and Other Pacific Islander	0	0.0%
Some other race	81	2.3%
Two or more races	141	4.1%
Hispanic or Latino (of any race)	245	7.0%

=== 2010 census ===
As of the census of 2010, there were 3,240 people, 1,469 households, and 828 families living in the city. The population density was 1,080.0 inhabitants per square mile (417.0/km^{2}). There were 1,602 housing units at an average density of 534.0 per square mile (206.2/km^{2}). The racial makeup of the city was 97.2% White, 0.5% African American, 0.4% Native American, 0.2% Asian, 0.1% Pacific Islander, 0.6% from other races, and 1.0% from two or more races. Hispanic or Latino of any race were 2.6% of the population.

There were 1,469 households, of which 24.8% had children under the age of 18 living with them, 44.7% were married couples living together, 8.0% had a female householder with no husband present, 3.7% had a male householder with no wife present, and 43.6% were non-families. 38.7% of all households were made up of individuals, and 21.2% had someone living alone who was 65 years of age or older. The average household size was 2.14 and the average family size was 2.85.

The median age in the city was 43.6 years. 21.9% of residents were under the age of 18; 7% were between the ages of 18 and 24; 22.5% were from 25 to 44; 25.9% were from 45 to 64; and 22.5% were 65 years of age or older. The gender makeup of the city was 47.8% male and 52.2% female.

=== 2000 census ===
As of the census of 2000, there were 3,376 people, 1,451 households, and 880 families living in the city. The population density was 1,360.5 inhabitants per square mile (525.3/km^{2}). There were 1,566 housing units at an average density of 631.1 per square mile (243.7/km^{2}). The racial makeup of the city was 98.07% White, 0.24% African American, 0.24% Native American, 0.24% Asian, 0.06% Pacific Islander, 0.50% from other races, and 0.65% from two or more races. Hispanic or Latino of any race were 1.18% of the population.

There were 1,451 households, out of which 27.8% had children under the age of 18 living with them, 51.5% were married couples living together, 6.6% had a female householder with no husband present, and 39.3% were non-families. 36.2% of all households were made up of individuals, and 23.6% had someone living alone who was 65 years of age or older. The average household size was 2.24 and the average family size was 2.94.

In the city, the population was spread out, with 23.5% under the age of 18, 7.7% from 18 to 24, 22.9% from 25 to 44, 21.6% from 45 to 64, and 24.4% who were 65 years of age or older. The median age was 42 years. For every 100 females, there were 86.2 males. For every 100 females age 18 and over, there were 82.9 males.

The median income for a household in the city was $32,234, and the median income for a family was $44,638. Males had a median income of $31,280 versus $23,444 for females. The per capita income for the city was $17,269. About 3.2% of families and 8.0% of the population were below the poverty line, including 4.0% of those under age 18 and 14.7% of those age 65 or over.

== Alternative energy ==
Benson is home to the Chippewa Valley Ethanol Company (CVEC), which produces a variety of ethanol products including E85. The plant also produces food-grade ethyl alcohol for adult beverages.

== Transport ==
The city owns and operates the Benson Municipal Airport Veterans Field.

== Notable people ==
- Lyn Yvonne Abramson, Professor of Psychology, University of Wisconsin–Madison
- Tiny Moving Parts, Midwest Emo band.
- Edgar Dale, Professor, College of Education and Human Ecology, Ohio State University, 1929–1970, internationally renowned developer of the Cone of Experience theory
- Saxe J. Froshaug, prohibitionist politician, member of U.S. House of Representatives, 1911–1915
- Darwin Hall, American politician, U.S. House of Representatives, 1889–1891
- David Hazewinkel, 1968 and 1972 U.S. Olympic Greco-Roman wrestler, coached wrestling in Benson in the 1970s
- Alfred I. Johnson, politician, Speaker of the Minnesota House of Representatives, 1955–1959
- James A. Johnson, Chairman and CEO, Fannie Mae, 1991–1998; Chairman, Kennedy Center for the Arts and Brookings Institution
- Mark Kennedy, American politician and university president, U.S. House of Representatives, 2001–2007
- Becca Kufrin, American television personality
- Ole J. Kvale, Lutheran minister and politician, U.S. House of Representatives, 1923–1929
- Paul John Kvale, Staff Editor of Minneapolis Tribune and politician, member of U.S. House of Representatives, 1929–1939
- Martha Ostenso, novelist and screenwriter, author of Wild Geese and 15 other novels, born in Norway (1900), emigrated to Minnesota, lived in rural Benson as a child
- Sandra Peterson, politician, Minnesota House of Representatives, 2005–2013
- Ernie Wheeler, longtime Benson educator and former professional football player, Chicago Cardinals and Pittsburgh Pirates, 1939–1942
- Henry G. Young, politician, Minnesota House of Representatives, 1937-40; Minnesota Senate, 1941-46

== Gallery ==
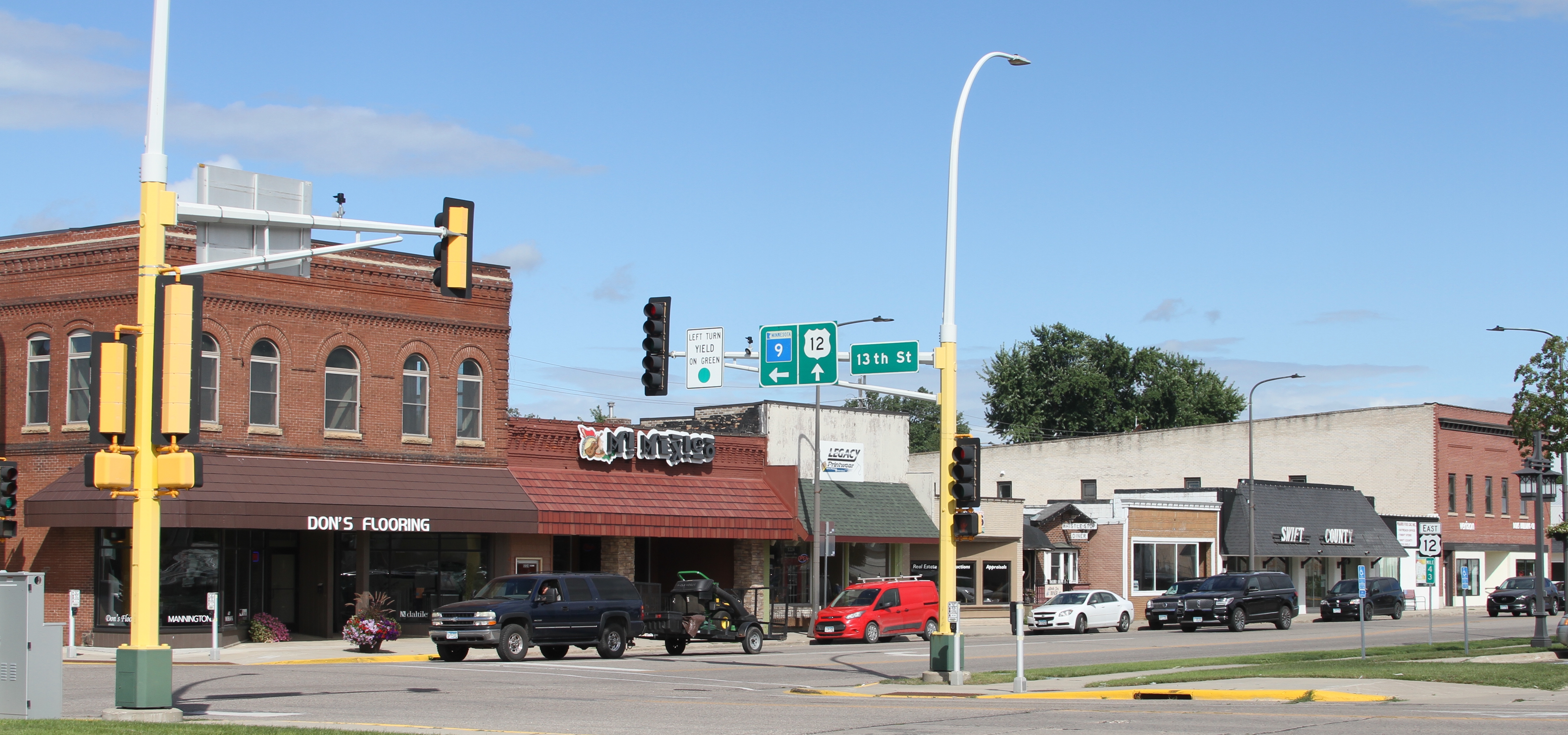
Atlantic Avenue and 13th Street

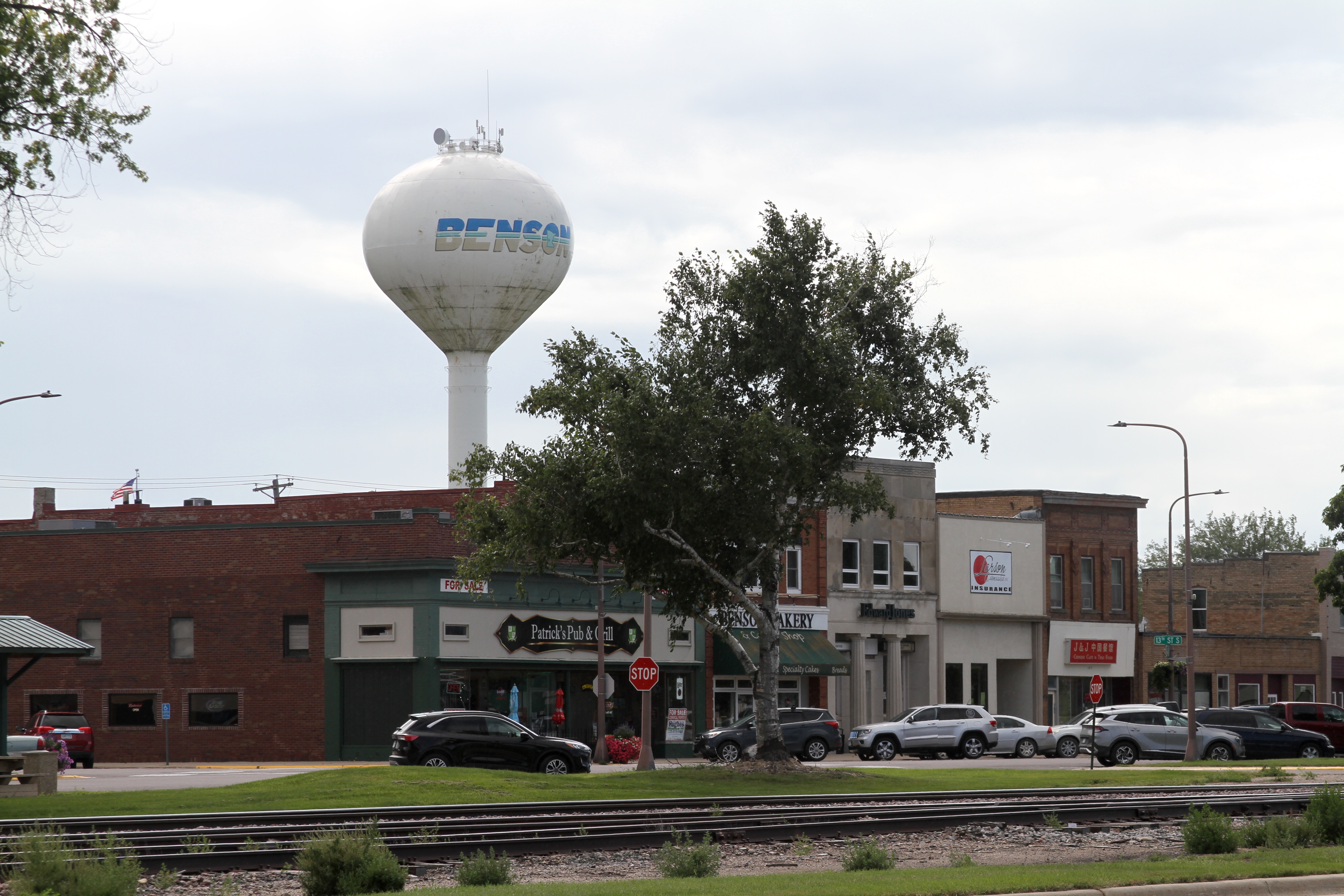
Pacific Avenue and 13th Street

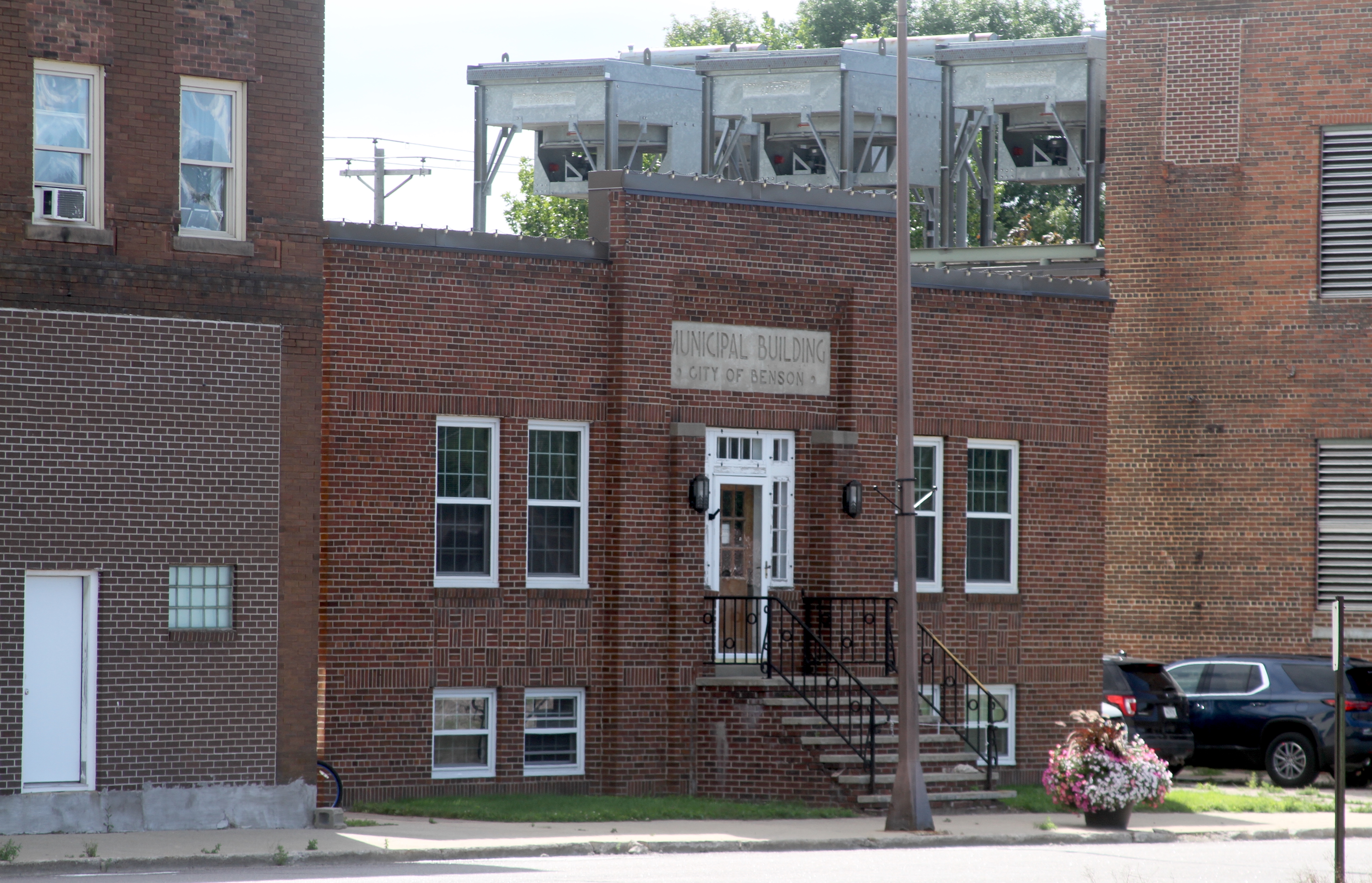
Former Municipal Building

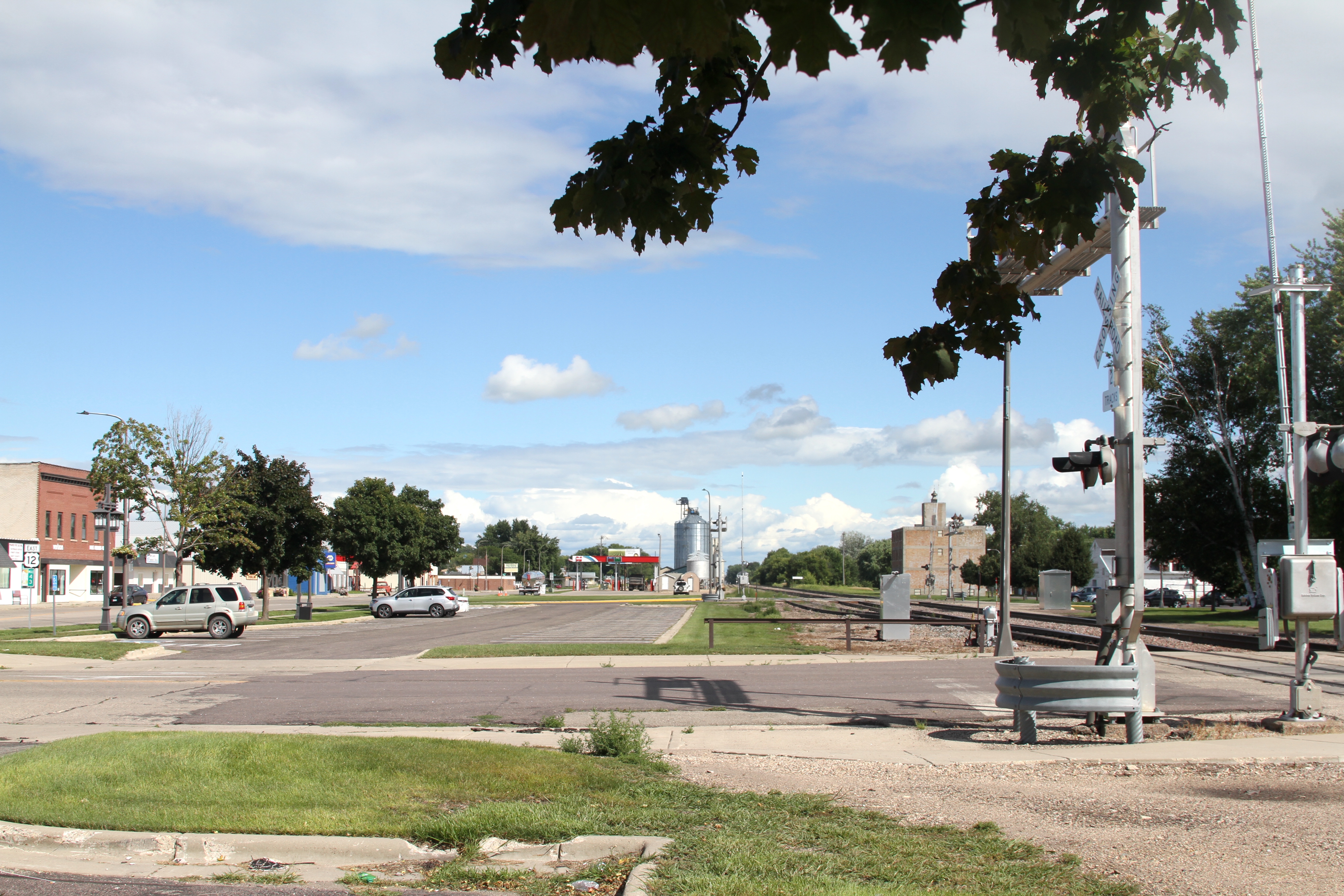
Railroad tracks between Atlantic and Pacific Avenues

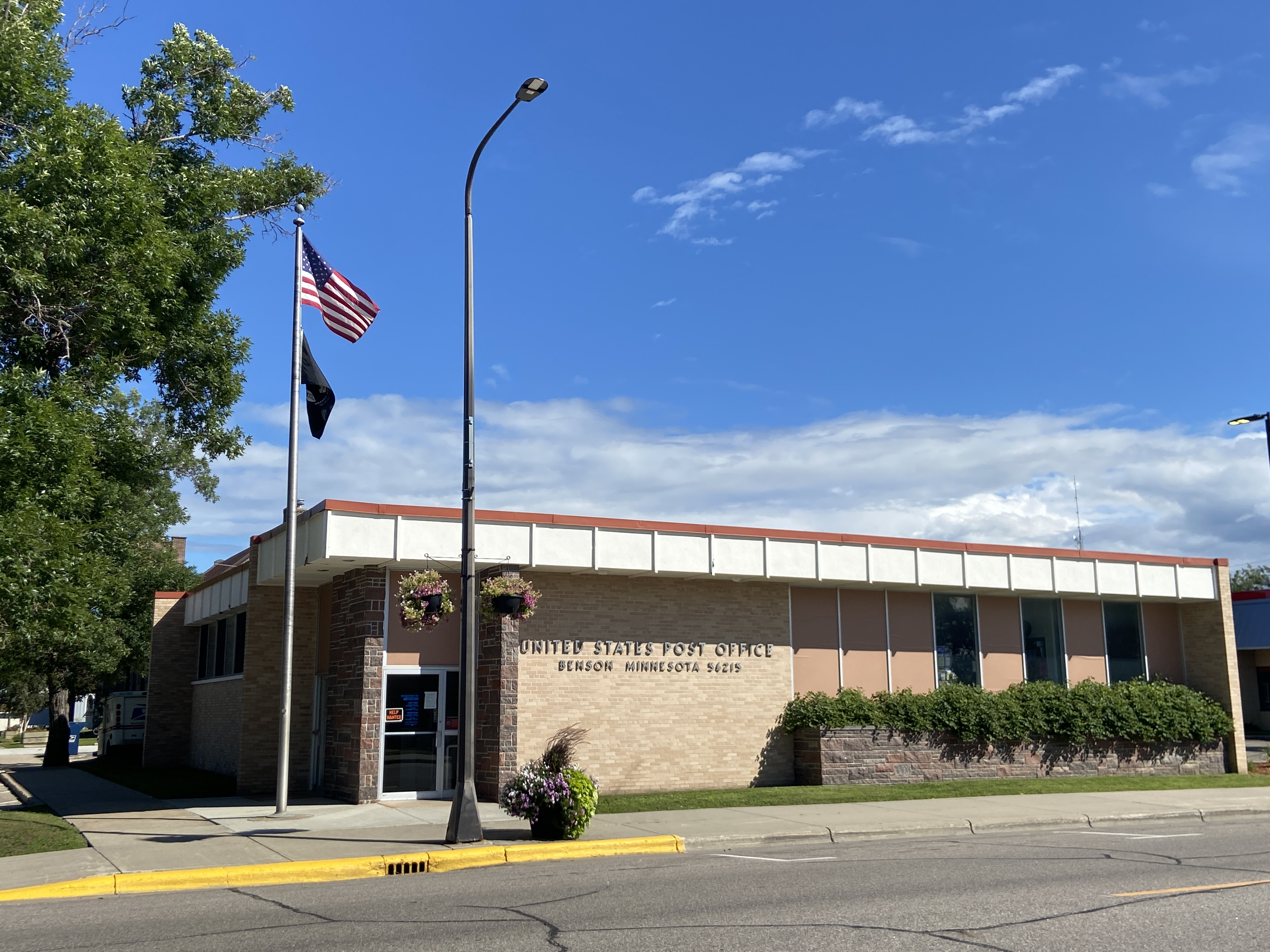
Post Office

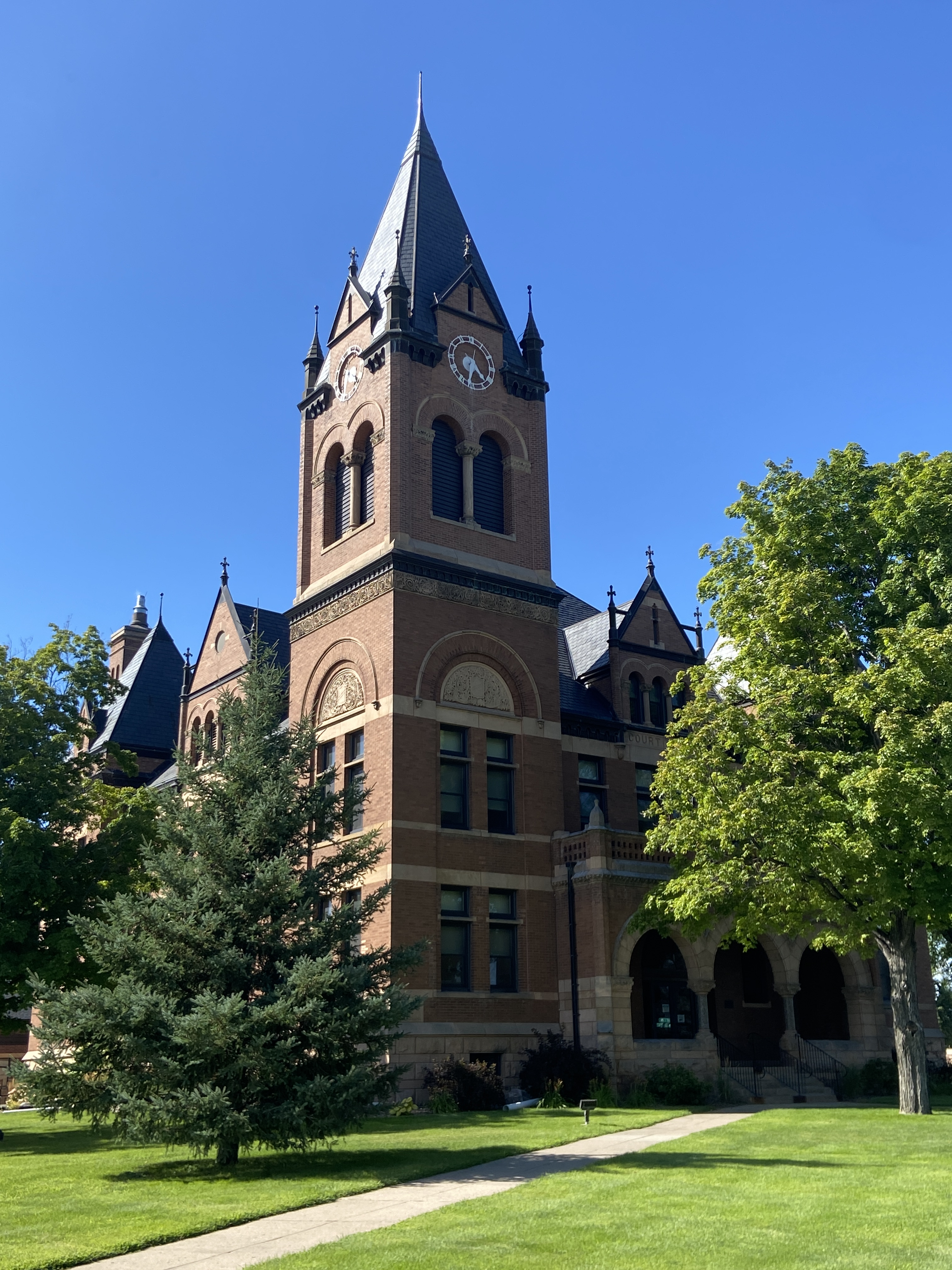
Swift County Courthouse

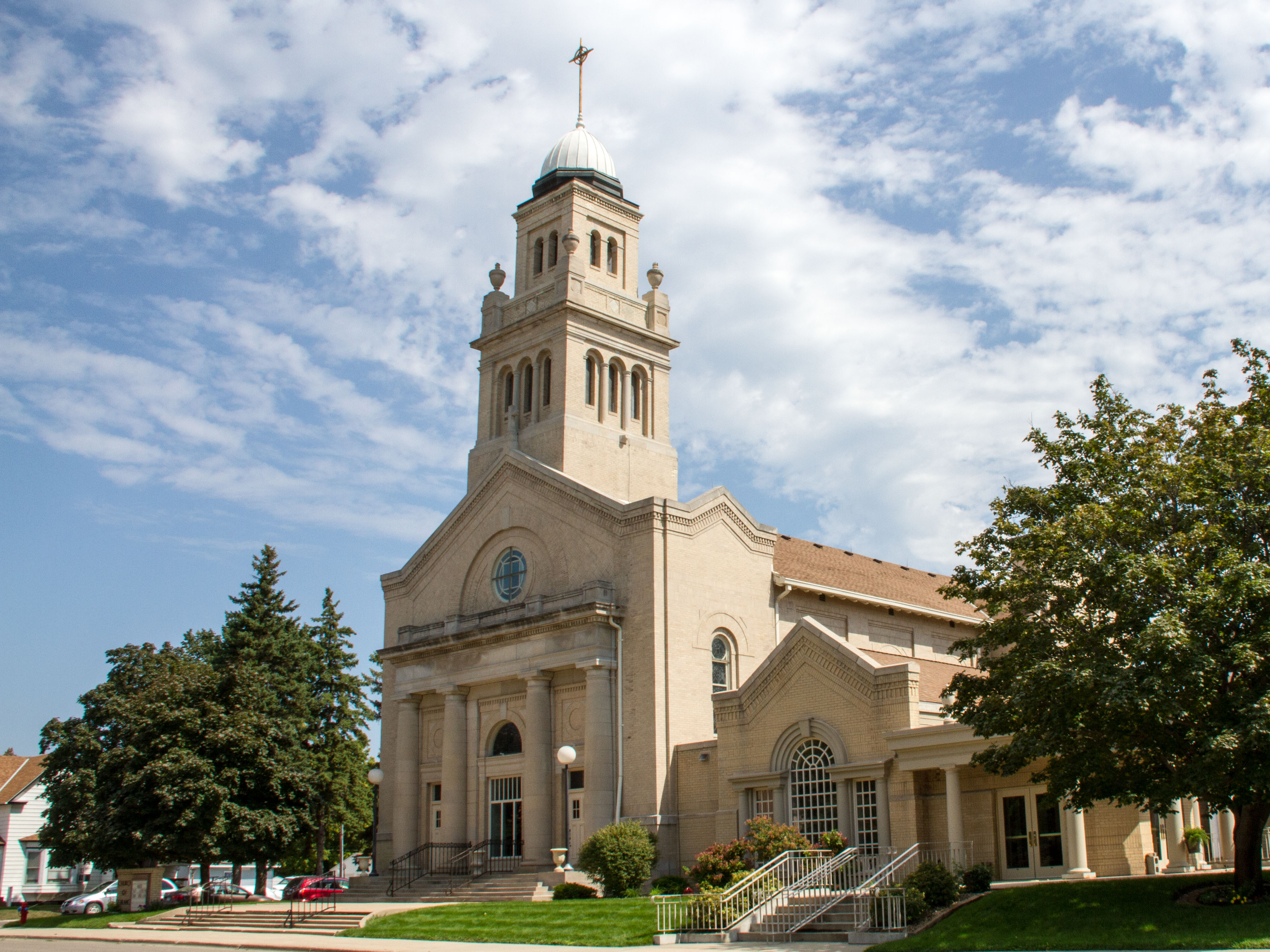
Church of St. Francis Xavier
