= Benson Municipal Airport (Arizona) =

Airport in Cochise County, Arizona

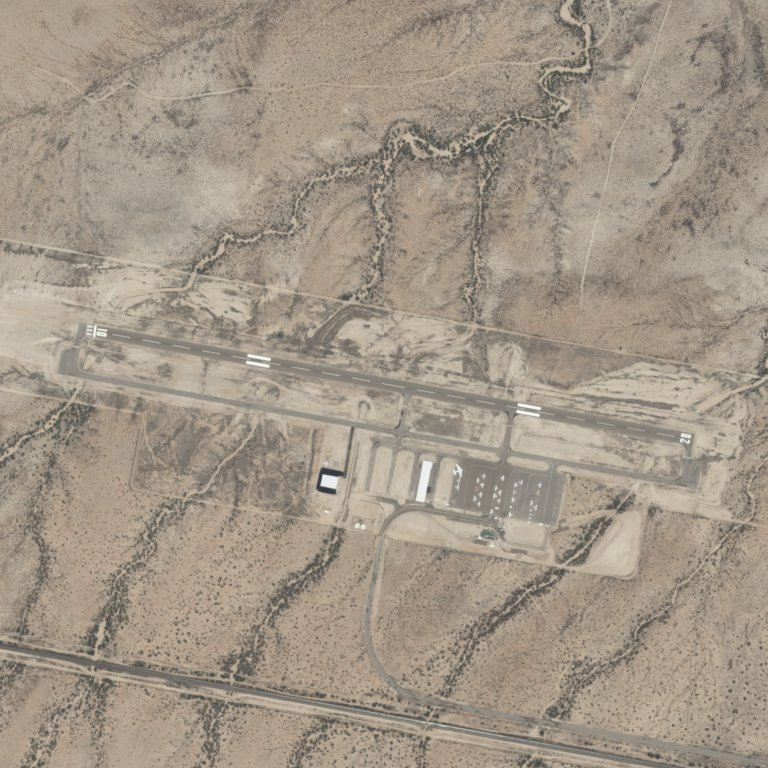
- IATA: none; ICAO: none; FAA LID: E95

Summary
- Airport type: Public
- Owner/Operator: City of Benson
- Serves: Benson, Arizona
- Elevation AMSL: 3,831 ft (1,168 m)
- Coordinates: 31°59′58″N 110°21′29″W
- Website: southwesternaviation.com

Map
- Location within Arizona Location within the United States

Runways
Direction	Length		Surface
Direction	ft	m	Surface
10/28	4,002	1,220	Asphalt

Statistics (2017)
- Aircraft operations: 24400
- Based aircraft: 38
- Source: Federal Aviation Administration

Benson Municipal Airport (FAA LID: E95) is a public use airport located 3.5 miles (3.0 nmi; 5.6 km) northwest of the central business district of Benson, a city in Cochise County, Arizona, United States and 35 miles (30 nmi; 56 km) east of Tucson International Airport (TUS). The airport was opened in November 1999.

Although most US airports use the same three-letter location identifier for the FAA, IATA, and ICAO 'Benson Municipal Airport is only assigned E95 by the FAA.

== Facilities and aircraft ==
Benson Municipal Airport covers an area of 140 acres (57 ha) at an elevation of 3,831 ft (1,168 m) above mean sea level. It has one runway:

- 10/28 measuring 4,002 ft × 75 ft (1,220 m × 23 m) asphalt

For the 12-month period ending April 15, 2017, the airport had 24,400 aircraft operations, an average of 67 per day: 92% general aviation, and 2% military. At that time there were 38 aircraft based at this airport: 84% single-engine, 5% ultralight, 3% multi-engine, 5% jet, and 3% helicopters.

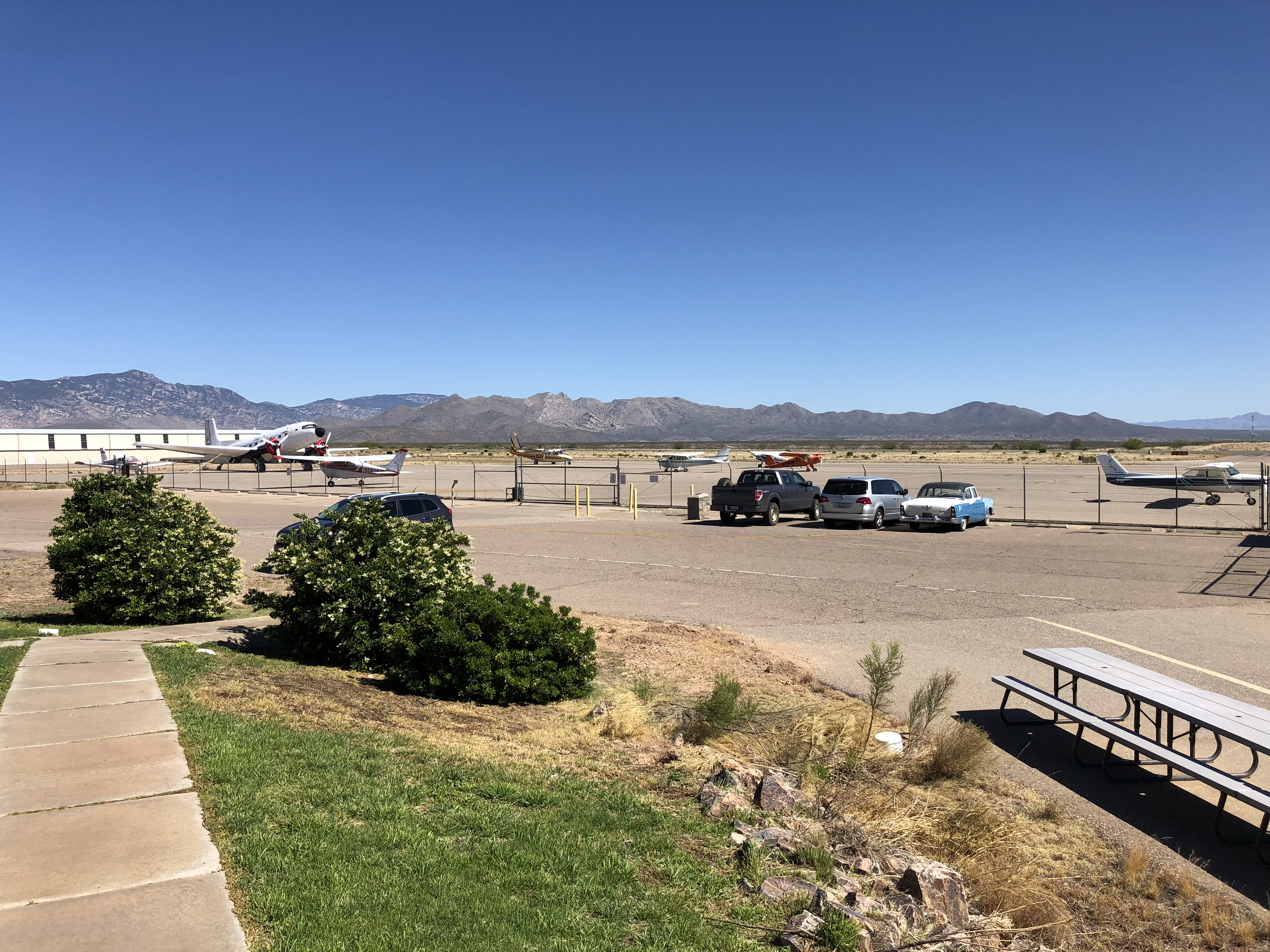
View of the ramp from the FBO at Benson Municipal Airport

== Awards and recognition ==
In 2012 the 1955 Dodge Coronet Airport Courtesy Car at Benson Municipal provided by FBO SouthWestern Aviation, LLC was named "Airport Car of the Month" for June by EAA Sport Aviation Magazine.

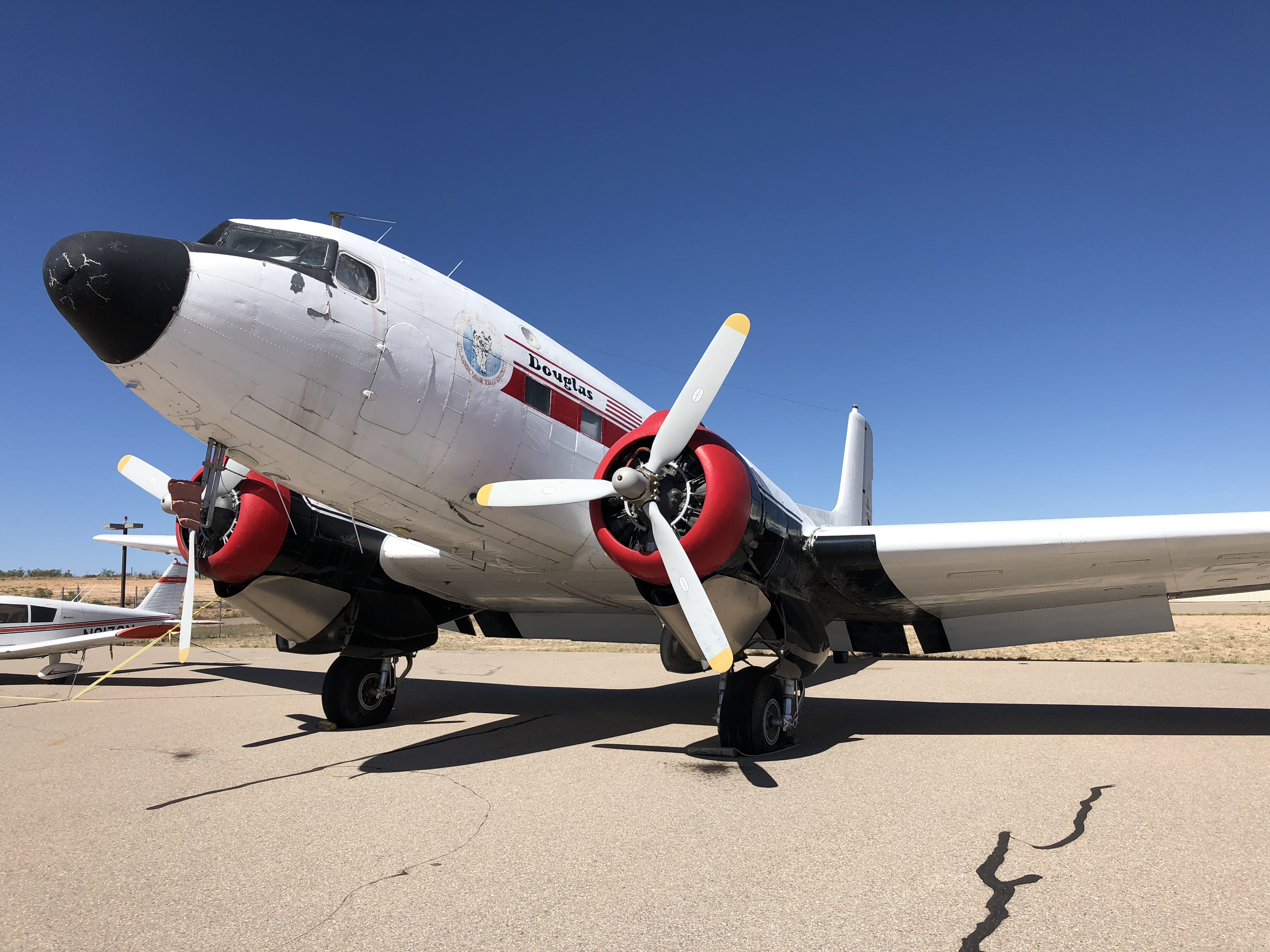
Douglas DC-3 on the ramp at Benson Municipal Airport (Arizona) E95

== See also ==
- List of airports in Arizona
