= Saxe J. Froshaug =

American politician

Saxe J. Froshaug (December 13, 1867 – October 8, 1916) was an American politician from Minnesota who served as a Prohibitionist member of the Minnesota Senate from 1911 to 1915.

Saxe J. Froshaug was born December 13, 1867, in Lee County, Illinois to Norwegian immigrants Dr. John O. Froshaugh and Caroline Froshaug (née Hanson). He was educated in Minnesota before moving to Chicago to study medicine. He then practiced in Texas for two years before returning to Minnesota. In 1895, he married Clara Malmstead with whom he had four children. He passed the Minnesota medical exam in 1899. In 1901, he was the County Coronor for Norman County, Minnesota. In 1907, he opened a medical practice in Benson, Minnesota.

He was elected as a Minnesota state senator in 1910 from the 56th district which included Big Stone and Swift counties in western Minnesota. During his 1914 re-election campaign, he ran on a platform of establishing a merit-based civil service system, women's suffrage; reducing taxes; and initiatives and referendums. He died October 8, 1916.
