= 1955 Dodge =

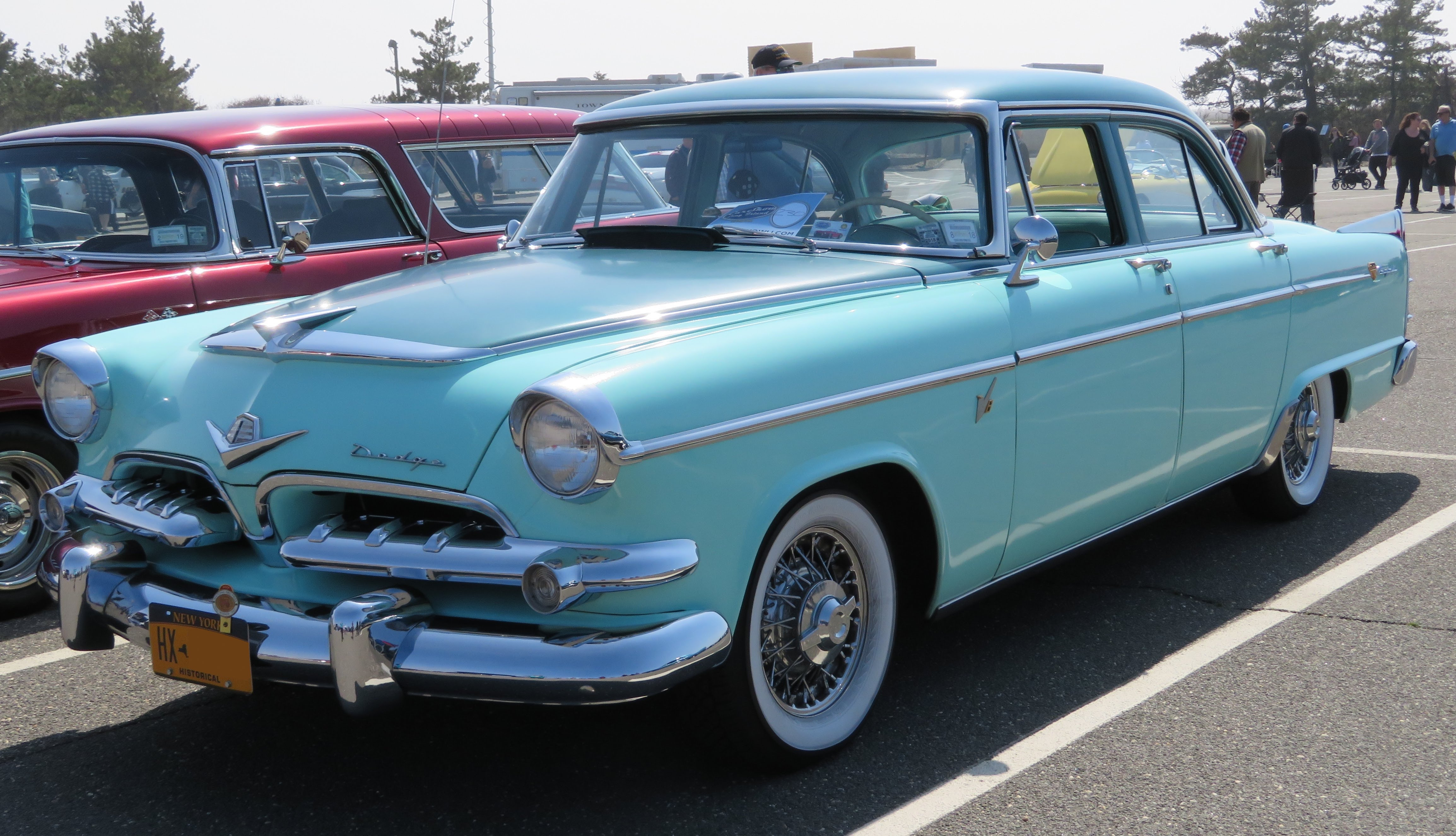
- 1955 Dodge Custom Royal Lancer sedan

Overview
- Manufacturer: Dodge (Chrysler)
- Also called: Dodge Coronet; Dodge Suburban; Dodge Royal; Dodge Sierra; Dodge Custom Royal
- Production: 1955–1956
- Assembly: Dodge Main Factory, Hamtramck, MI

Body and chassis
- Class: Full-size
- Body style: 2-door coupe 4-door sedan 2-door hardtop coupe 2-door wagon 4-door wagon 2-door convertible
- Layout: FR layout
- Related: DeSoto Custom; Plymouth Plaza

Powertrain
- Engine: 230 in^{3} (3.8 L) Getaway I6; 270 in^{3} (4.4 L) Red Ram V8; 325 cu in (5.3 L) V8; 350 cu in (5.7 L) V8; 361 cu in (5.9 L) V8
- Transmission: 2-speed automatic 3-speed manual 3-speed automatic

Dimensions
- Wheelbase: 120 in (3048 mm)
- Length: 212.1 in (5387 mm)

Chronology
- Successor: 1957 Dodge

The 1955 Dodge car lineup, consisting of the entry-level Coronet, Royal, and ornate Custom Royal, was a major departure for the company. Driven almost out of business in 1953 and 1954, the Chrysler Corporation was revived with a $250 million loan from Prudential and new models designed by Virgil Exner. The Dodge lineup was positioned as the mainstream line in Chrysler's hierarchy, between DeSoto and Plymouth.

== Overview ==
The 1955 Dodge was all-new with a 120 in (3048 mm) wheelbase and 212.1 in (5387 mm) overall length, longer than the 1954 cars. They shared their basic mechanicals with the DeSoto Custom, but had distinct styling. These cars lasted through the 1956 model year before being replaced by an all-new 1957.

There were six body styles and four trim levels for 1955:

1955 Dodge body styles and trim levels
Model	2-door sedan	4-door sedan	2-door hardtop coupe	2-door wagon	4-door wagon	2-door convertible
Coronet	I6/V8; Coronet	I6/V8; Coronet	V8; Lancer	I6/V8; Suburban	I6/V8; Suburban	
Royal		V8; Royal	V8; Royal Lancer		V8; Sierra	
Custom Royal		V8; Custom Royal	V8; Custom Royal Lancer			V8; Custom Royal Lancer

== Coronet ==
The Coronet (and Suburban station wagon) was the base model. This was the only line to feature the 230 in^{3} (3.8 L) Getaway I6 as well as the 270 in^{3} (4.4 L) Red Ram V8. Coronets were available in all body styles except the convertible. Sedans feature "Coronet" badges on the fenders, while the station wagons are called "Suburban". Although the hardtop coupe was officially named "Lancer", it wore only "Coronet" badges. Turn signals were standard on the Royal and Custom Royal models but optional on the base Coronet.

== Royal ==
The Royal (and Sierra wagon) were the next step up. Featuring only the V8 engine, the Royal also lacked the 2-door sedan and wagon models available in the Coronet line. Early hardtop coupes lack the "Lancer" script, although they were officially Lancers, but later models wore "Royal Lancer" badges.

== Custom Royal ==
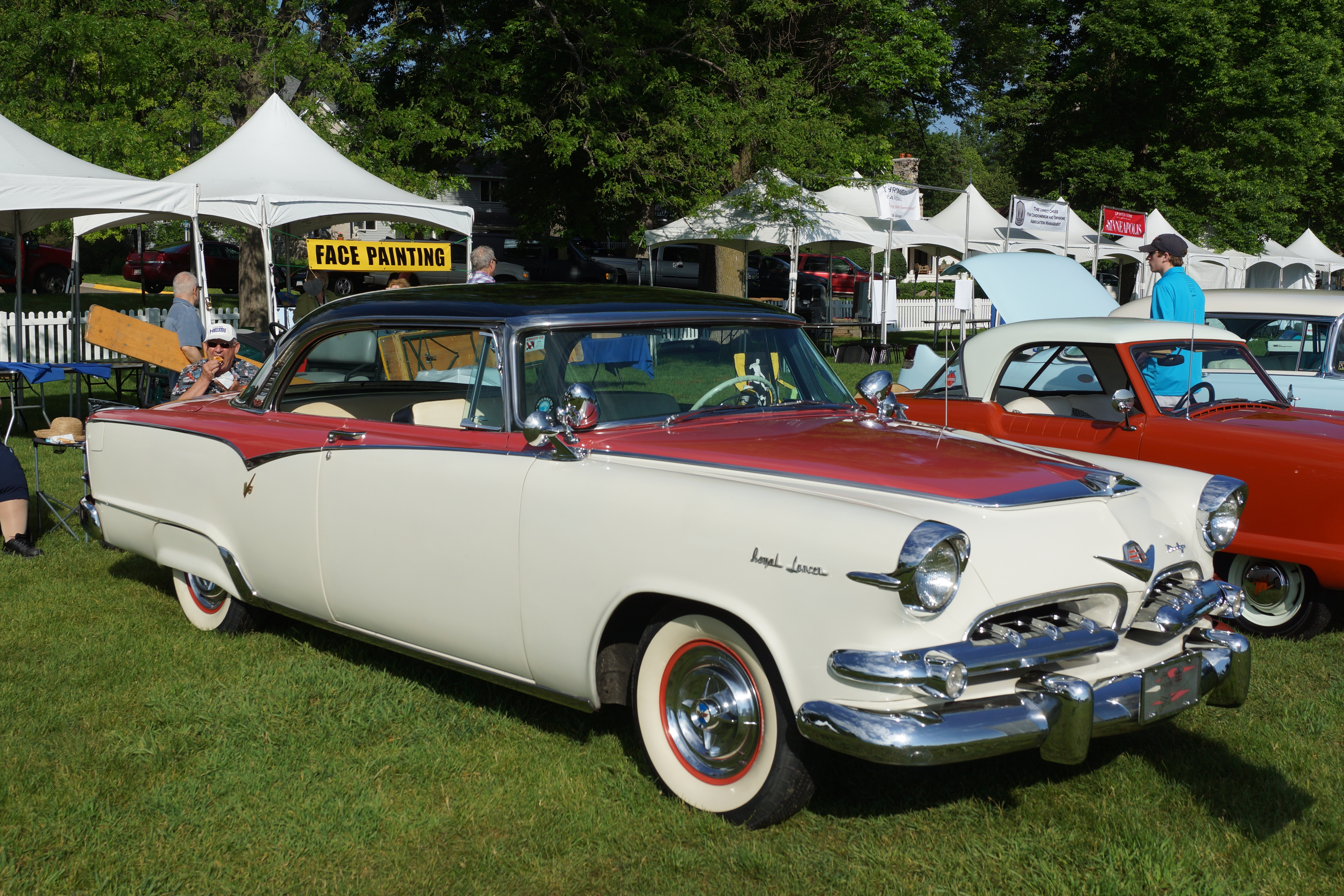
1955 Custom Royal Lancer hardtop coupe

The flagship model was the Custom Royal. All hardtop coupe and Custom Royal-only convertible models were called "Custom Royal Lancer". The Custom line featured unique chrome tailfins (although early model year cars went without this trim), special tail light surrounds, and an upscale interior. Backup lights were standard on the Custom line but optional on all others. The Custom Royal also featured the hemi 270 CID Super Red Ram engine.

== La Femme ==
The La Femme was a special package oriented towards women, who made up an increasing share of Dodge buyers. It came in Heather Rose and Sapphire White colors and included a cape, boots, umbrella, and shoulder bag that matched the floral tapestry-like fabrics. Changes to the car include built-in compartments in the seatbacks to hold these accessories.

== D-500 ==
The 1956 D-500 was a high-performance model derived from the standard 1956 Dodge but differing in many ways. It included a heavy duty suspension and other chassis upgrades from the New Yorker and Imperial lines, upgraded brakes, and a high-performance 315 in^{3} (5.2 L) Hemi-head V8. A four-barrel Carter carburetor pushed output to 260 hp (194 kW) and 330 lb·ft (447 N·m). The 3-speed manual transmission was standard, with the PowerFlite 2-speed automatic as an option. A rare NASCAR-specific option was the D-500-1(Dash-1), which upped power to 285 hp (213 kW). The D-500 originally used only the Coronet 2-door sedan and Royal Lancer hardtop and convertible bodies.

== 1957 ==
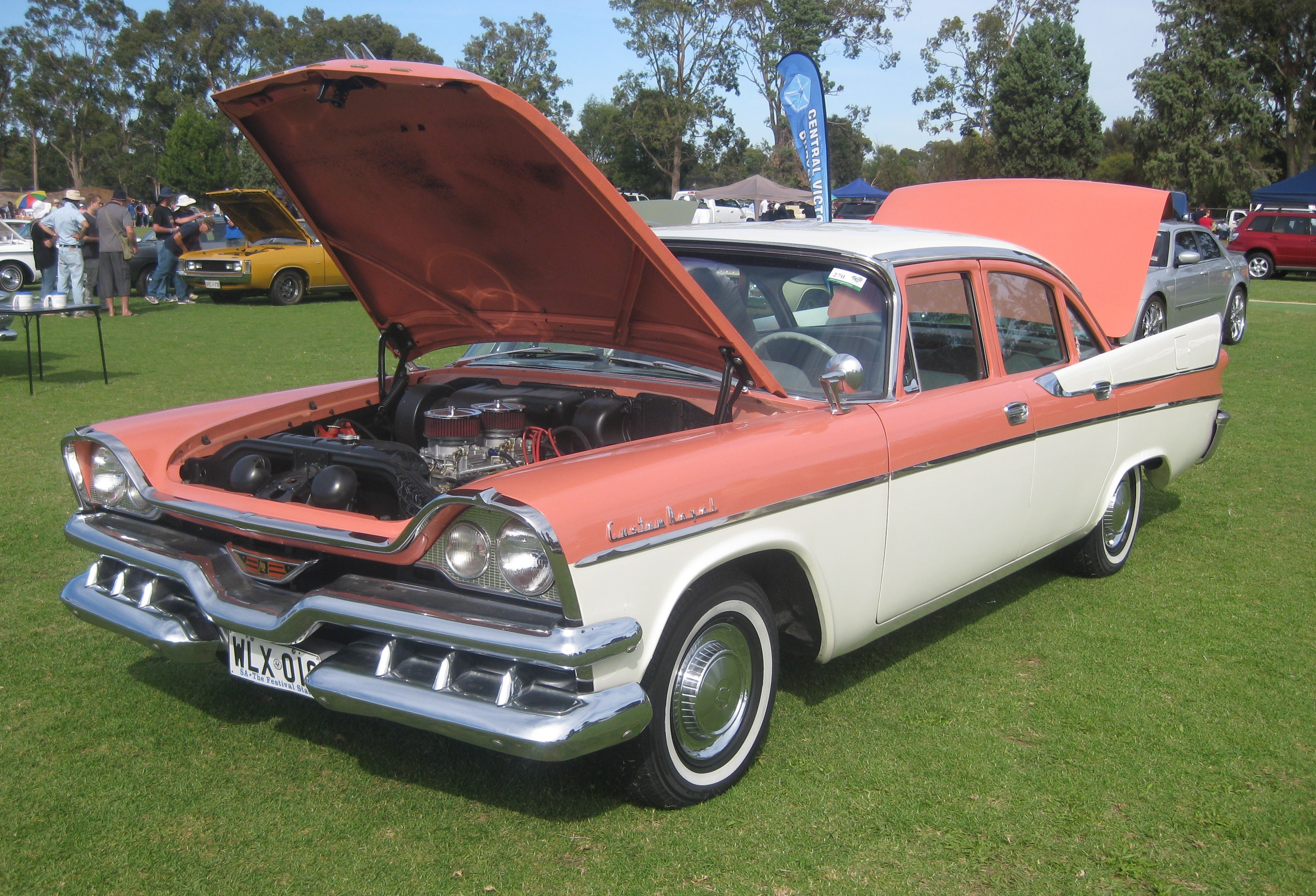
1957 Dodge Custom Royal 4-Door Sedan

For the 1957 model year, Chrysler embarked on a second total linewide redesign. Virgil Exner's "Forward Design" brought about cars that were bigger and more sleek than anything before, and instantly put a company that had traditionally regarded styling as unimportant on the forefront of automotive design. Unfortunately, two total redesigns in as many years resulted in severe build quality and rust problems, so that many 1957 Chryslers, Dodges, and Plymouths were off the road within three years of their purchase.

== 1958 ==
While many of the quality issues were resolved for the 1958 model year, which brought about some minor styling tweaks, a recession struck that was particularly damaging to sales of mid-range cars. Dodge production had exceeded 337,000 cars for 1957 but the 1958 total fell by over half to less than 140,000, although some of this loss was due to negative publicity from the cars' poor quality control.

== 1959 ==
1959 Dodges were facelifted to gain a heavy, drooping look with hooded headlamps. Swivel-out seats became an option. Production for the model year totaled 156,395 cars, a modest increase over 1958. The highlight of the lineup was the performance-oriented D-500 package.

== Technical specifications ==
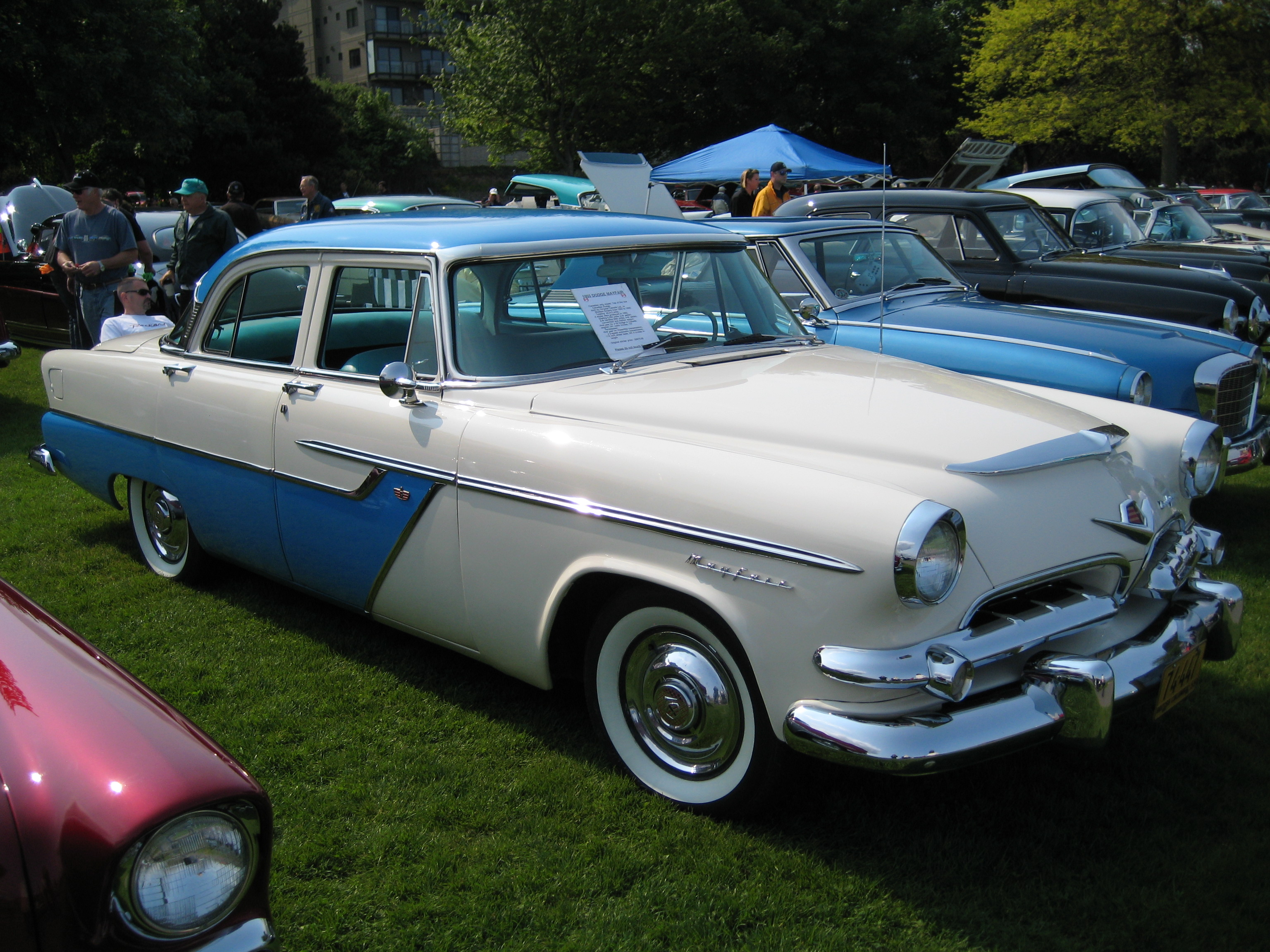
Canadian-built 1955 Dodge Mayfair, a Plymouth Belvedere with a Dodge front end

Power came from either a 230 cu in (4 L) flathead straight six or one of two 270 cu in (4 L) V8s. The regular Red Ram V8 was standard on the Royal and optional on the Coronet. A hemi V8 (the Super Red Ram) was standard on the Custom Royal. A rare Power Pack was optional, consisting of a four-barrel Carter carburetor and dual exhausts good for 193 hp (144 kW; 196 PS) with the Hemi engine.

Two transmissions were offered: a three-speed manual with optional overdrive and Chrysler's two-speed PowerFlite automatic. The PowerFlite was controlled by a dash-mounted lever, though this was changed to a push-button setup for 1956.

The cars used a special coil spring/kingpin suspension in front and regular leaf springs and a live axle at the rear. Power steering was optional. A six-volt electrical system was updated to 12 volts in 1956.
