= Benson Municipal Airport (Minnesota) =

- IATA: BBB; ICAO: KBBB; FAA LID: BBB

Summary
- Airport type: Public
- Owner: City of Benson
- Serves: Benson, Minnesota
- Elevation AMSL: 1,039 ft (317 m)
- Coordinates: 45°19′55″N 095°39′02″W

Map
- Location of airport in Minnesota/United States BBB (the United States)

Runways
| Direction | Length | | Surface |
| Direction | ft | m | Surface |
|---|---|---|---|
| 14/32 | 4,000 | 1,219 | Asphalt |

Statistics (2006)
- Aircraft operations: 5,100
- Based aircraft: 12
- Source: Federal Aviation Administration

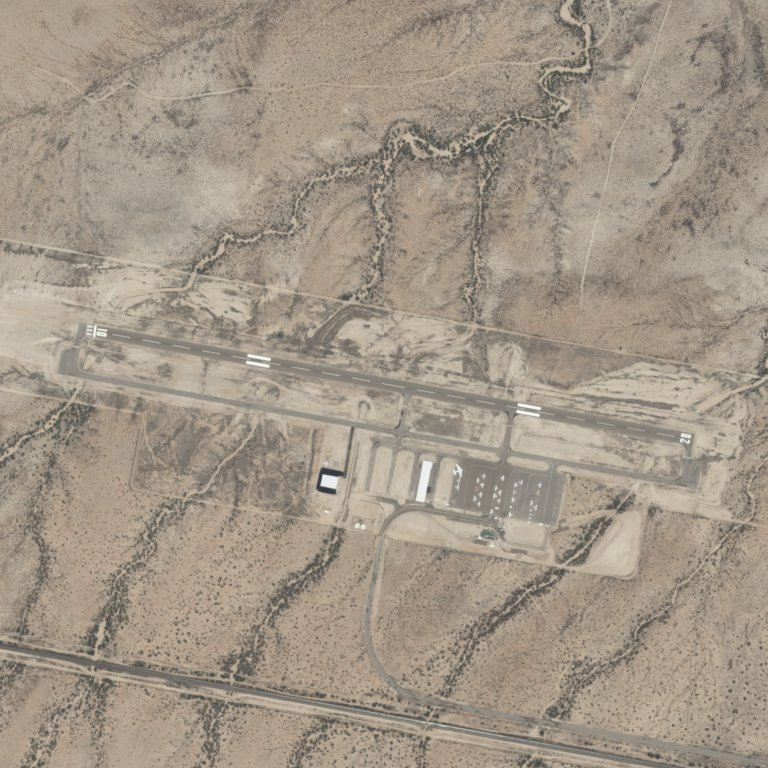
Aerial view of Benson Municipal Airport, Minnesota, USA

Benson Municipal Airport Veteran's Field (IATA: BBB, ICAO: KBBB, FAA LID: BBB) is a city-owned public-use airport located two miles (3 km) west of the central business district of Benson, a city in Swift County, Minnesota, United States.

The airport opened at its current site sometime in the late 1930s. There have been many improvement projects since. The last major improvement project, started in 1986, included a runway extension and a parallel taxiway. A completion ceremony was held on August 13, 1988.

== Facilities and aircraft ==
Benson Municipal Airport covers an area of 331 acres (134 ha) and has one runway designated 14/32 with an asphalt surface measuring 4,000 by 75 feet (1,219 x 23 m).

For the 12-month period ending July 31, 2006, the airport had 5,100 aircraft operations, an average of 13 per day: 98% general aviation and 2% air taxi. There are 12 aircraft based at this airport: 92% single-engine and 8% ultralight.

In May 2018, the Benson City Council agreed to pursue improvements to the municipal airport for a new aviation dual-fuel storage tank at the airport and the removal of the old fuel tank. The Minnesota Pollution Control Agency ordered the city to replace the old tank.

== See also ==
- List of airports in Minnesota
