= Dodge Dart =

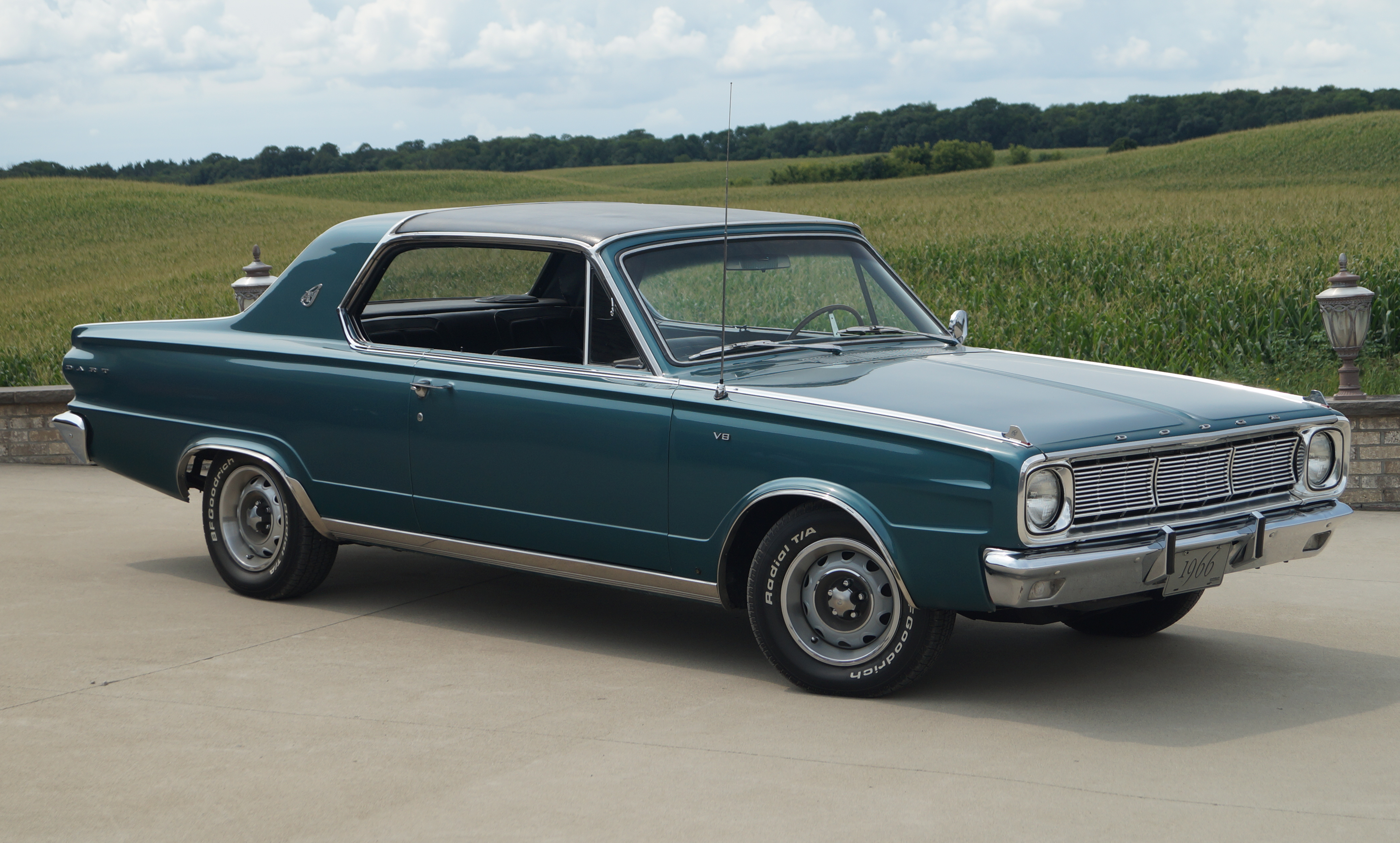
- 1966 Dodge Dart 2-door hardtop

Overview
- Manufacturer: Dodge (Chrysler)
- Production: 1959–1976
- Model years: 1960–1976 (North America)

Body and chassis
- Class: Full-size (1960–1961); Mid-size (1962); Compact (1963–1976); Luxury car (for Spanish market)
- Layout: FR layout
- Related: Plymouth Valiant; Chrysler Valiant; Dodge Phoenix

Chronology
- Predecessor: Dodge Coronet (for full-size version); Dodge Lancer (for compact version); Simca Esplanada (Brazil)
- Successor: Dodge Aspen; Dodge Diplomat; Talbot Tagora (for Barreiros models/Spain)

The Dodge Dart is a line of passenger cars produced by Dodge from the 1959 to 1976 model years in North America, with production extended to later years in various other markets.

The production Dodge Dart was introduced as a lower-priced full-size model in 1960 and 1961, but became a mid-size car for one model year for 1962, and was then reduced to a compact for two generations, from 1963 to 1976.

Chrysler had first used 'Dart' name plates on two Italian styled show cars, in 1956 and 1957, before it became a Dodge model name. The Dart nameplate was resurrected for a Fiat-derived compact car that was introduced in 2012.

== Early history ==
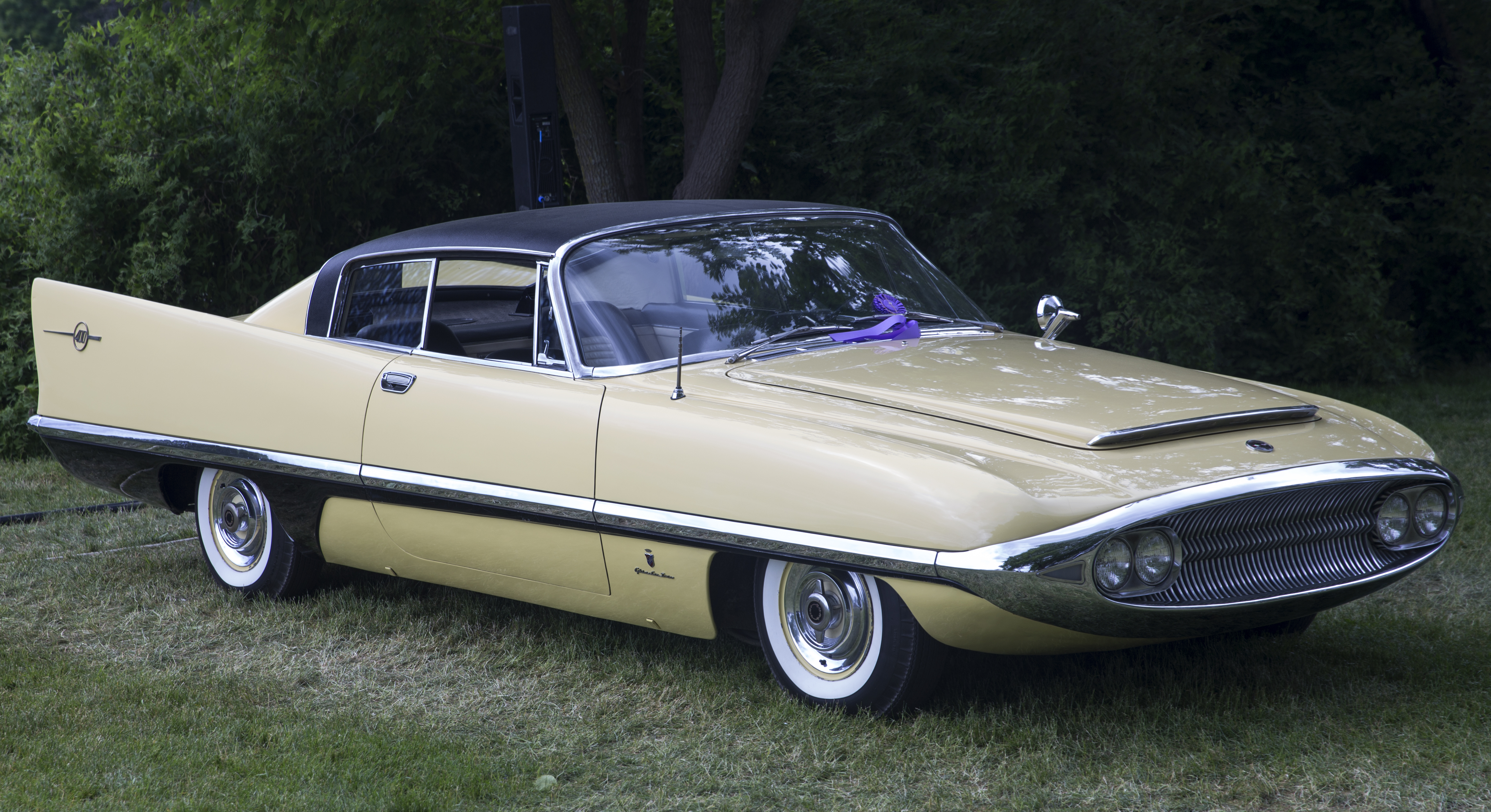
1957 Chrysler (Ghia) Dart show-car, initially called the 'Super Dart 400'

The Dart name originally appeared on a 1956 Chrysler show car, featuring a streamlined body designed by the Italian coachbuilder Carrozzeria Ghia, that was later modified and renamed the Dart Diablo. For 1957, Ghia built Chrysler a second, visually similar show car, the Chrysler Ghia Super Dart 400.

== First generation (1960–1961) ==
First generation
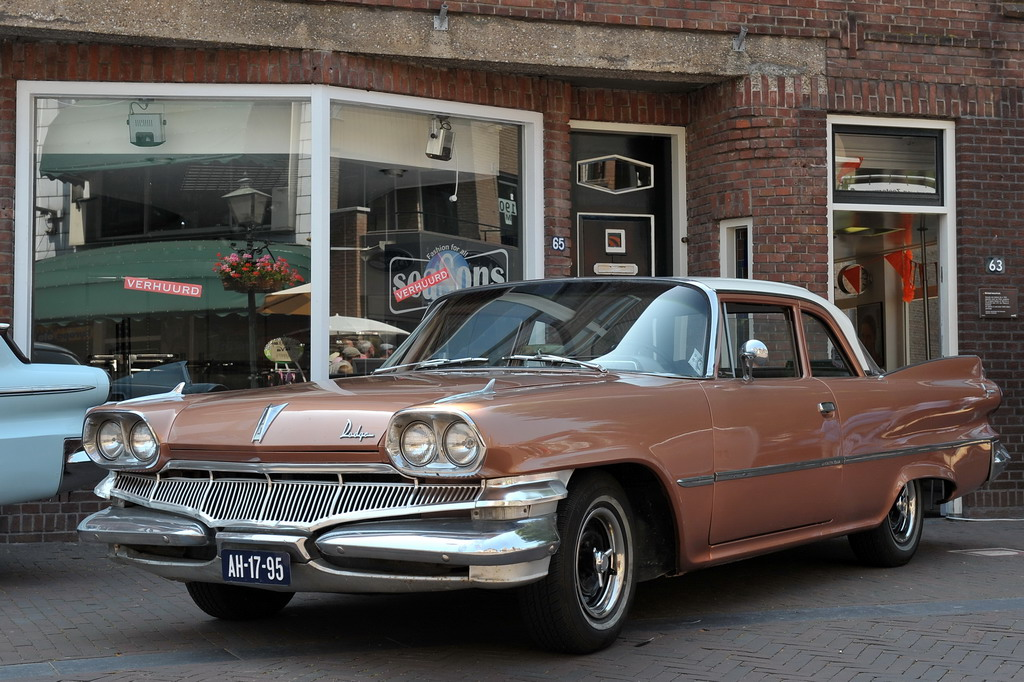
- 1960 Dart Seneca 2-door sedan

Overview
- Production: 1959–1961
- Model years: 1960–1961
- Assembly: United States; Canada: Windsor, Ontario

Body and chassis
- Body style: 4-door wagon 4-door sedan 2-door sedan 4-door hardtop 2-door hardtop 2-door convertible
- Related: DeSoto Firesweep; Dodge Phoenix; Plymouth Fury

Powertrain
- Engine: 225 cu in (3.7 L) slant-6 318 cu in (5.2 L) V8; 361 cu in (5.9 L) V8; 383 cu in (6.3 L) V8
- Transmission: 3-speed manual 3-speed Torqueflite automatic

Dimensions
- Wheelbase: 118 in (2,997 mm); 122 in (3,099 mm) (wagons)
- Length: 210.5 in (5,347 mm); 216.5 in (5,499 mm) (wagons)
- Width: 78.7 in (1,999 mm)
- Height: 54.8 in (1,392 mm)
- Curb weight: 1,582–1,814 kg (3,488–3,999 lb)

=== 1960 ===
The first Dodge Darts were introduced for the 1960 model year. They were downsized large cars developed to replace Plymouths in the standard, low-priced car segment for the Dodge dealer network. Dodge dealers had been selling Plymouths since 1930, but divisional restructuring took the Plymouth brand away from the Dodge dealer network. Project planners proposed the name Dart, only to have Chrysler executives demand an expensive research program that produced the name Zipp. This was promptly rejected in favor of Dart.

With the cancellation of Chrysler's upper level DeSoto brand, upper-level Dodge products were pushed upmarket, while using Plymouth products with more features for lower-level Dodge products.

The Dart sedans and coupes were based on the unibody Plymouth platform with a 118 in (2,997 mm) wheelbase, shorter than the standard-size Dodge line. However, the Dart station wagons used the same 122 in (3,099 mm) wheelbase as the upmarket Polara wagons. The Dart line was offered in three trim levels: the basic Seneca, mid-range Pioneer, and premium Phoenix. The new Dart came standard with a new engine, the 225 cu in (3.7 L) slant-six. The 318 cu in (5.2 L) (standard equipment on certain Phoenix and Pioneer body styles) and 361 cu in (5.9 L) V8s were optional with two-barrel or four-barrel carburetors, and with single or dual exhaust. The Dodge 383 cu in (6.3 L) V8 was added in 1961. Brakes were 11-inch drums.

Sales of the new Dart were greater than those of the full-size Dodge Matador and Dodge Polara, which also created an in-house competitor for Plymouth. Advertising from 1960 and 1961 compared the Dart to the "C" car (Chevrolet), the "F" car (Ford) and the "P" car (Plymouth). After the economic downturn of 1958–59, Dodge production for 1960 rebounded to 367,804 cars, the division's highest total to date, and good for sixth place behind Chevrolet, Ford, Plymouth, Rambler, and Pontiac. Chrysler officials were somewhat less comforted at how 87% of Dodge's volume consisted of the low-profit Dart line, compared to the upmarket Matador and Polara, of which only 41,000 were sold for the 1960 model year.

As the Dart's sales climbed, Plymouth's sales dropped. Chrysler executives did little to stop the infighting between the divisions. Dart sales were so strong in 1960 that production of the medium-priced model lines were reduced. The full-size, mid-priced Matador was discontinued after the 1960 model year as buyers selected the slightly smaller but better-appointed and less expensive Dart Phoenix. The premium Polara remained in the medium-price segment in 1961.

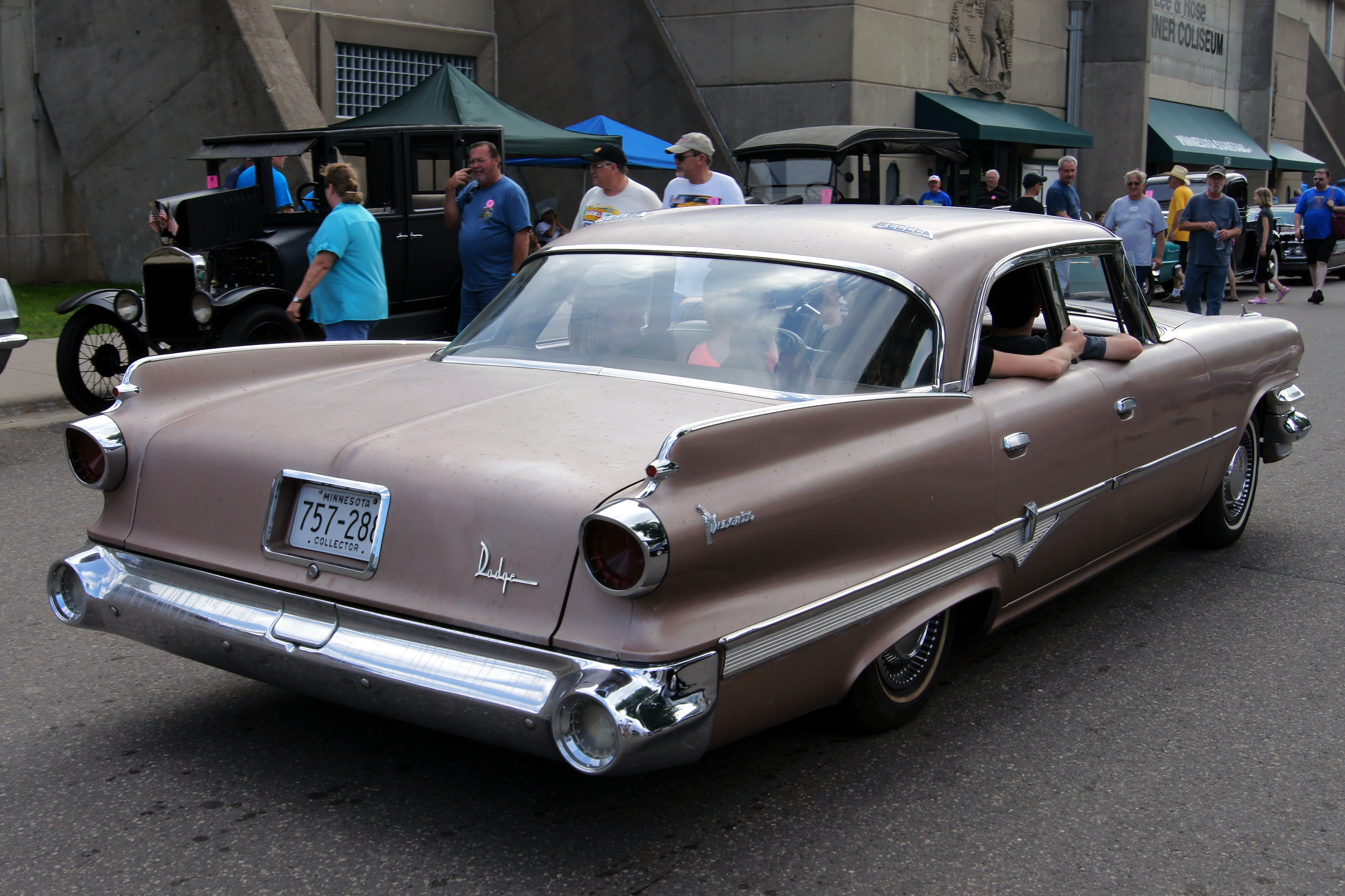
1960 Dart Phoenix 4-door sedan rear view

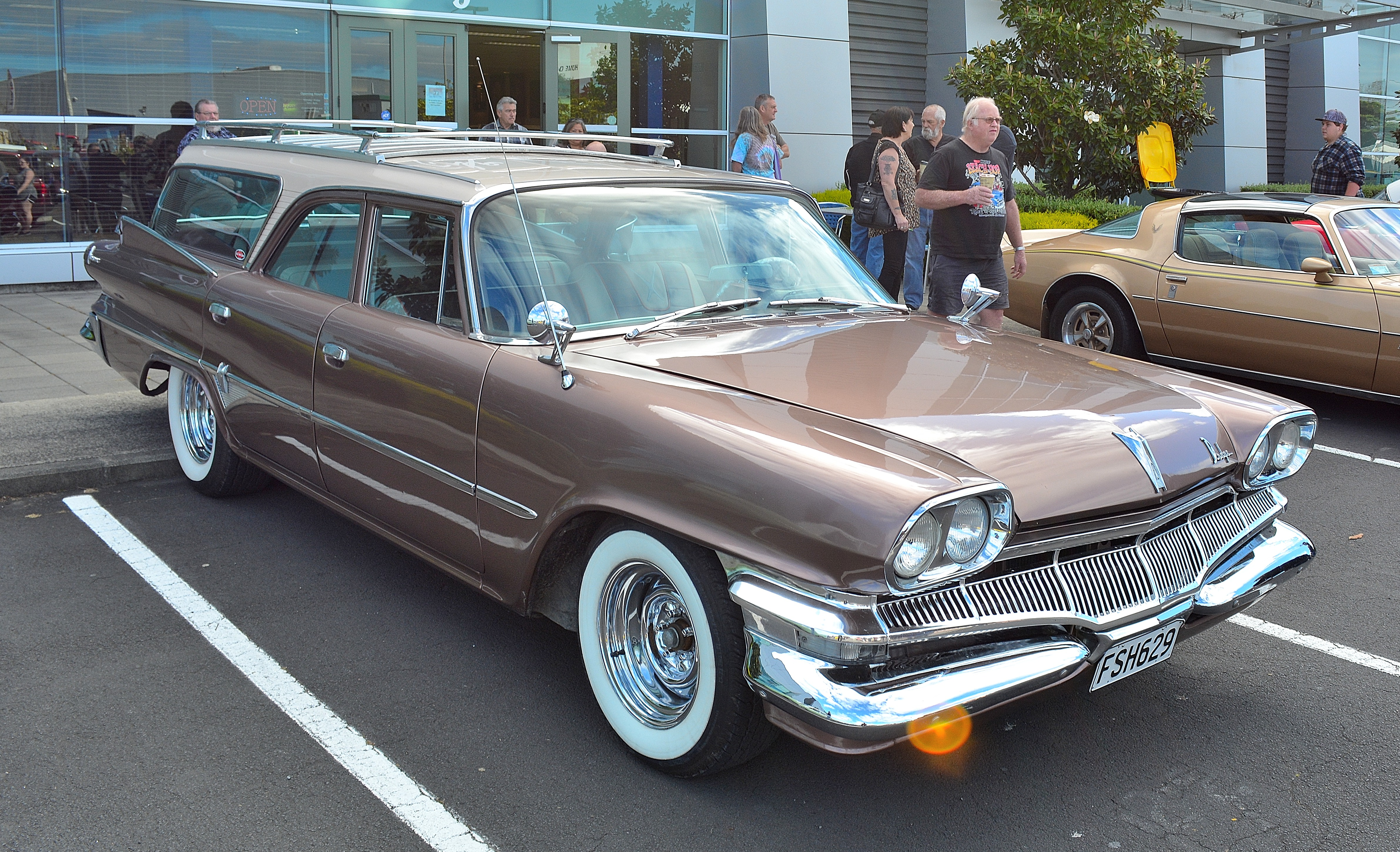
1960 Dart Pioneer wagon

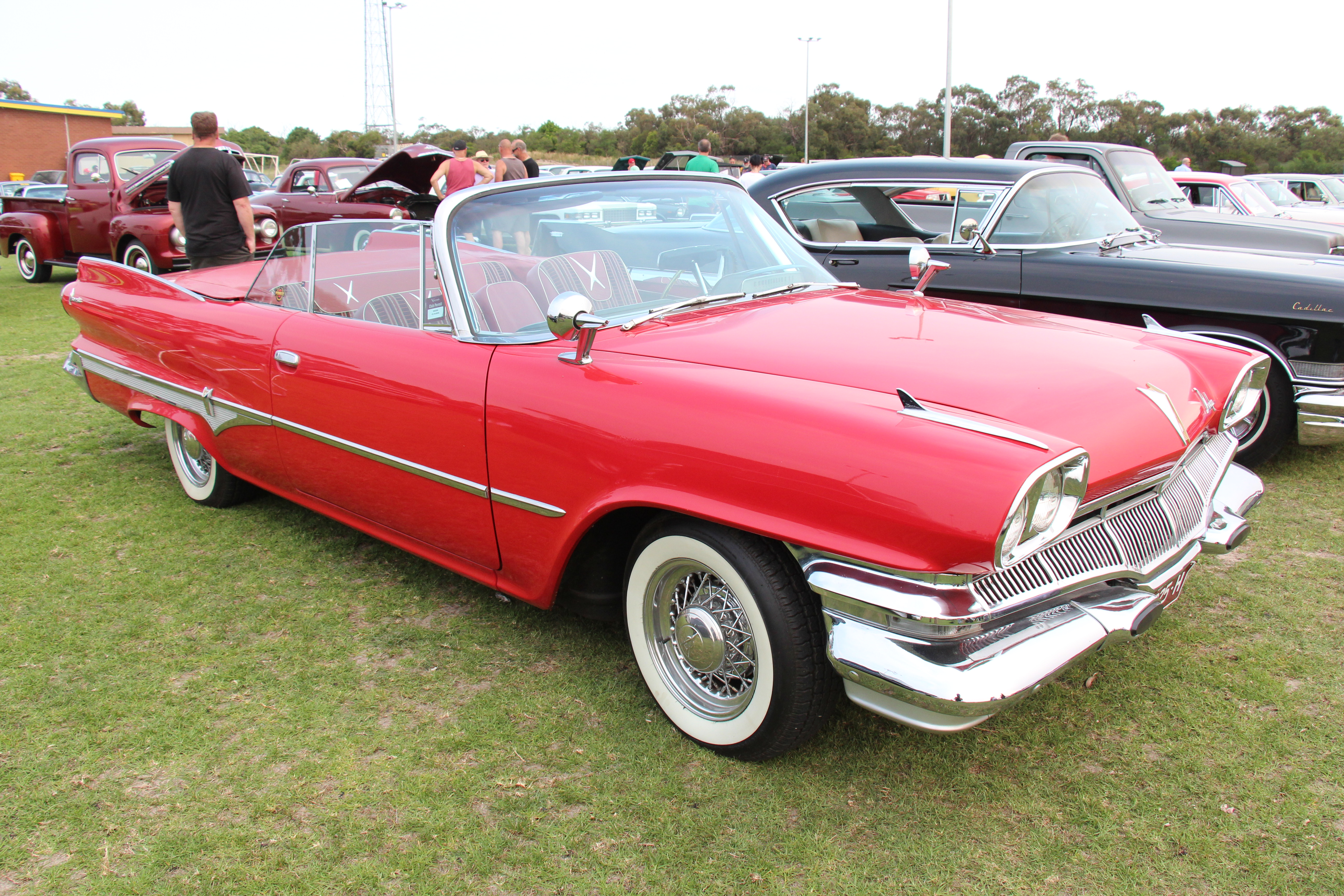
1960 Dart Phoenix 2-door convertible

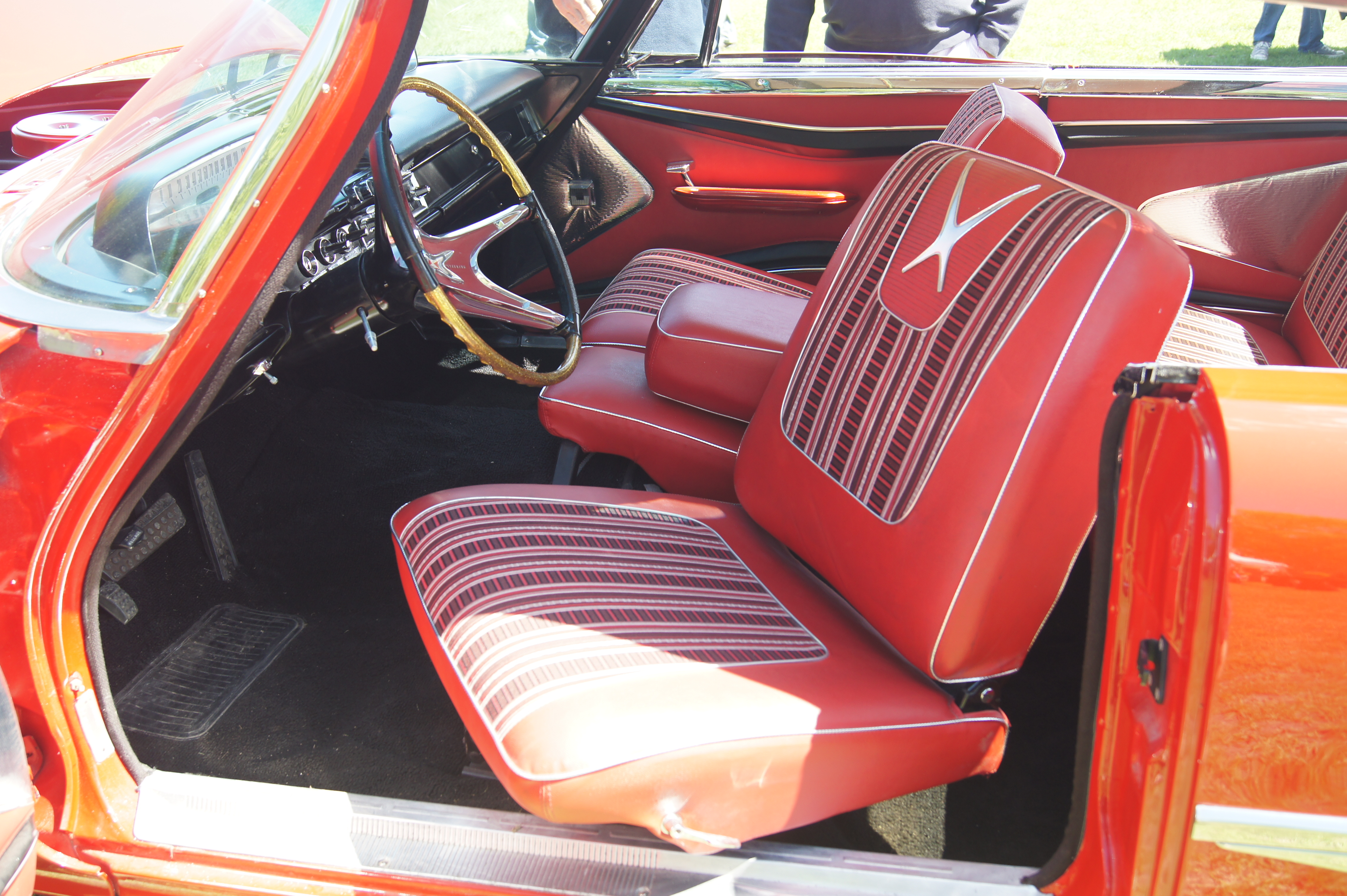
1960 Dart Phoenix D500 2-door convertible interior with the optional swivel seats

=== 1961 ===
For the 1961 model year, the Dart continued as the smallest full-size Dodge. It retained the 118 in (2,997 mm) wheelbase, and was restyled to emulate the larger Polara. The same three trim levels were available: the premium Phoenix, mid-range Pioneer, and base Seneca. Once again, wagons shared the Polara's 122 in (3,099 mm) wheelbase; they also shared the Polara's unique side-mounted taillights.

Engine choices included the 225 cu in (3.7 L) slant-six, and the 318 cu in (5.2 L) and 361 cu in (5.9 L) V8s were also available in various configurations. Phoenix convertibles were equipped with V8 engines. Beginning mid-year, some Darts ordered with the 225 engine were equipped with the die-cast aluminum block. Darts in all series were equipped as standard with three-speed, column-shifted manual transmissions. Chrysler's pushbutton-shifted TorqueFlite automatic was available at extra cost. The alternator, introduced as standard equipment in 1960 on the Valiant, replaced the previous DC generator on all 1961 Chrysler products. Canadian-built 1961 Darts were identical to U.S. models on the outside, but the interior trim, controls, and displays were those used on the U.S. Plymouth.

Virgil Exner's 1961 styling with its reverse fins, rear fender scalloping (the taillights were widely referred to as "ingrown toenails"), and the concave grille was highly unpopular with consumers. The low position and small size of the Dart's tail lights, just above the corners of the bumper, was also criticized and drivers of following cars complained that they could not see them. The wraparound taillights projected light sideward, not rearward. By mid-year, Dodge made auxiliary taillights available at extra cost through its dealer network. However, these large round lights were mounted near the inboard side of the reverse fins and aggravated the already awkward styling.

The 1961 automobile market was generally an off-year for automobile sales, and Dodge production went down to 269,367 units, of which 142,708 were Darts. Among all the Darts sold, almost half (66,100) were the Seneca line, down from 111,600 in 1960. Combined sales of Dart and Polara were lower than Plymouth's sales for 1961. Dodge ranked ninth in sales in the American market in 1961, down from sixth place in 1960. Sales of the compact Dodge Lancer were 74,773 units compared to its Plymouth twin, the Valiant, which sold 143,078 units for the same year. The 1961 model year saw Dodge's total production drop below the slow-selling 1959 model year and almost the disastrous recession year of 1958 when Dodge faced the consequences of the poor reputation of its 1957 models.

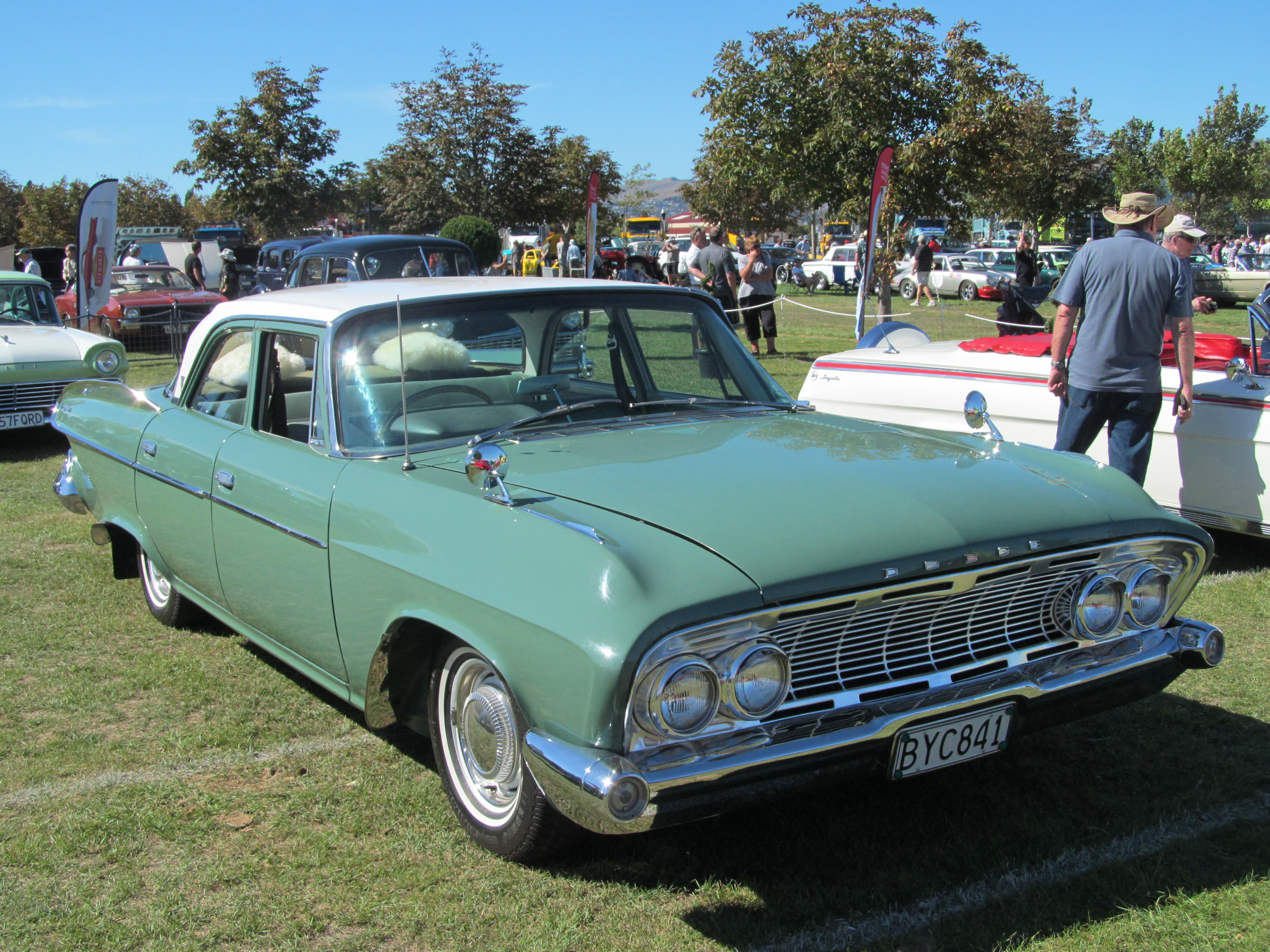
1961 Dart Pioneer 4-door sedan. This example is in New Zealand and features right-hand drive.

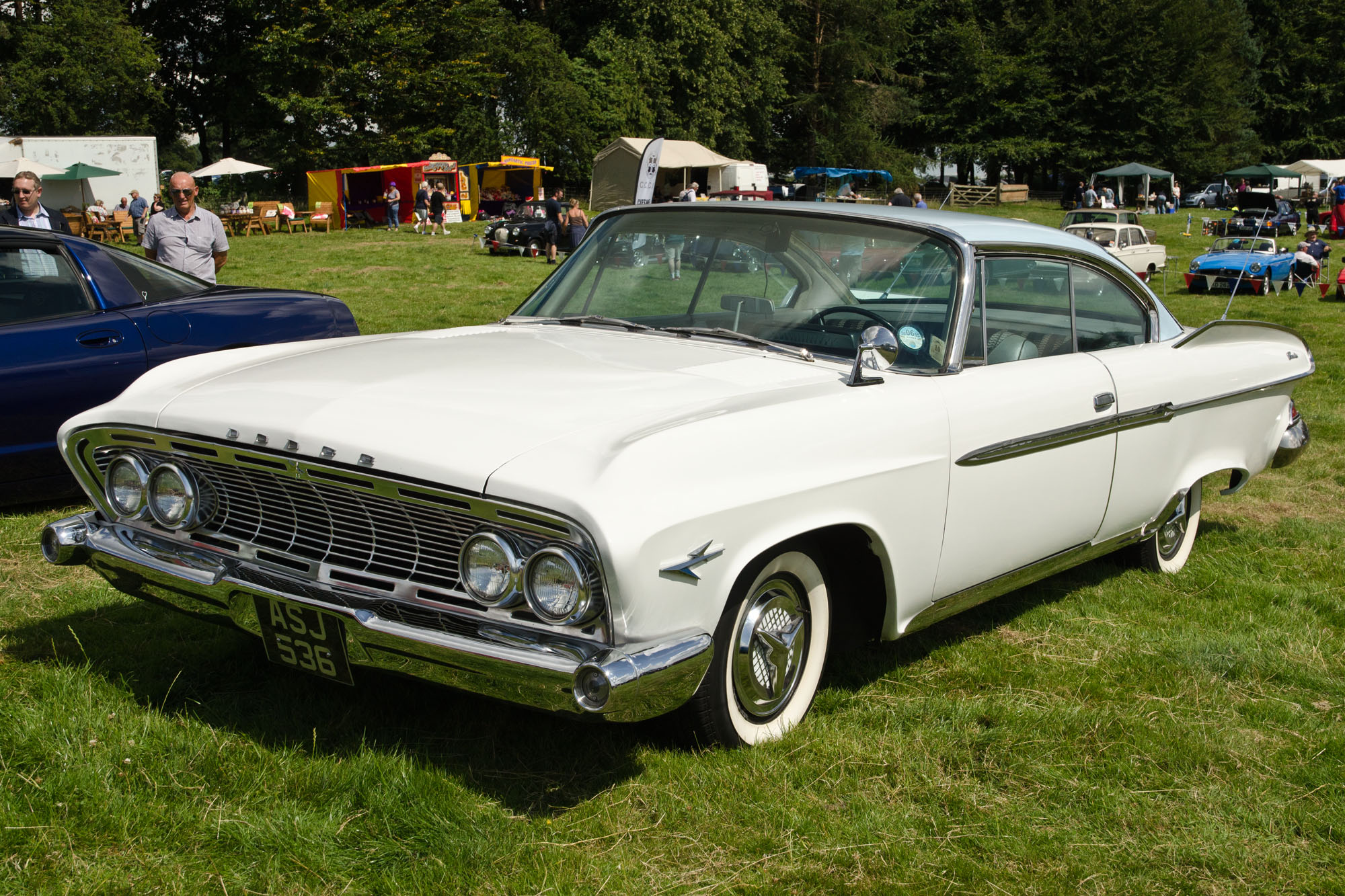
1961 Dart Phoenix 2-door hardtop

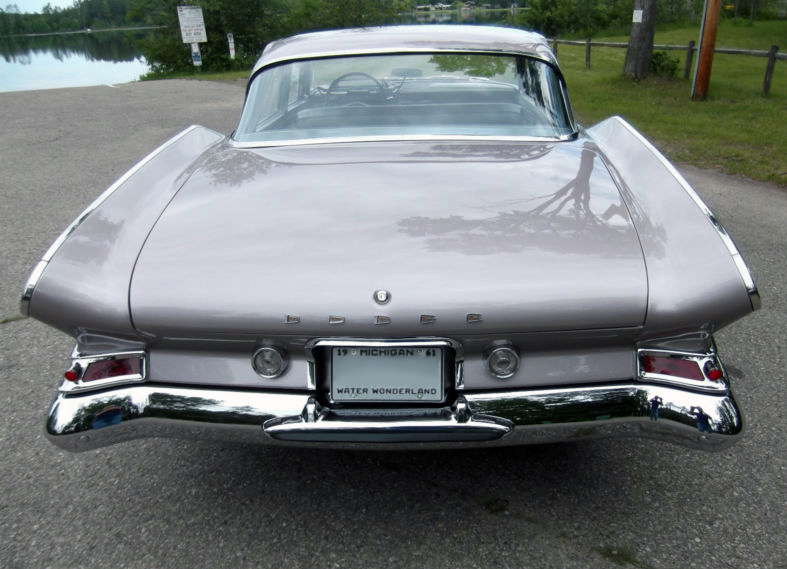
Rear view, showing small, low-mounted taillights

== Second generation (1962) ==
Second generation
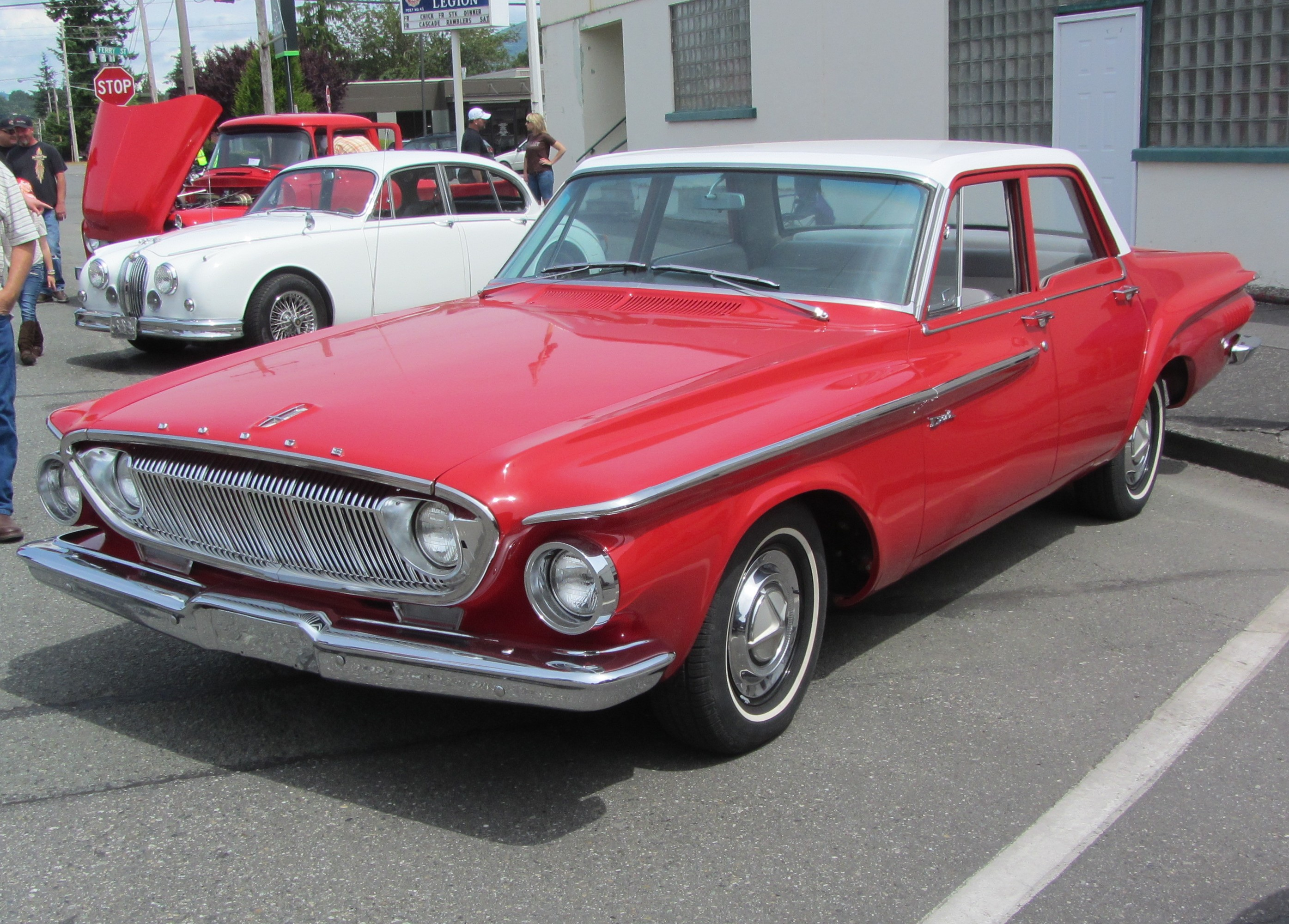
- 1962 Dart 4-door sedan

Overview
- Production: 1962
- Model years: 1962
- Assembly: United States: Newark, Delaware

Body and chassis
- Body style: 4-door wagon 4-door sedan 2-door sedan 4-door hardtop 2-door hardtop 2-door convertible
- Related: Dodge Polara; Plymouth Savoy; Plymouth Belvedere; Plymouth Fury; DeSoto Diplomat; Dodge Phoenix

Powertrain
- Engine: 225 cu in (3.7 L) slant-6 I6; 318 cu in (5.2 L) V8; 361 cu in (5.9 L) V8; 413 cu in (6.8 L) V8
- Transmission: 3-speed manual 3-speed Torqueflite automatic

Dimensions
- Wheelbase: 116 in (2,946 mm)
- Curb weight: 1,492–1,550 kg (3,289–3,417 lb)

For 1962, the Seneca, Pioneer, and Phoenix trim levels and names were dropped – instead trim levels became Dart, Dart 330, Dart 440, and Polara 500, offered in downsized two- and four-door hardtop, and convertible styles, that stood out by their raised, protruding grilles, encompassing what look like inner headlights, similar to the inner headlights in the protruding grille of a 1969 Ford Mustang.

The Dodge Polara 500 was dimensionally identical but not officially a Dart by dint of its different name, and it was not built nor sold in Canada. The Dart models were the same in Canada as in the U.S. except that the base model was badged Dart 220.

The Dart and Polara were downsized as part of Chrysler's hasty effort to compete with what company leaders thought would be downsized large cars from Chevrolet. However, they had overheard talk not of the big Chevrolets, but of the compact Chevy II Nova. This was a basic front-engine compact to compete more directly than the Corvair with the Ford Falcon, Rambler American, and Plymouth Valiant. Chevrolet's Impala and Ford's Galaxie both remained sized in accord with the prevailing norms of full-size cars.

The redesigned Dart was perceived more as an intermediate, like the Rambler Classic or the Ford Fairlane. When Dodge dealers voiced their displeasure at having no true full-size car to offer, Chrysler quickly created the Dodge Custom 880 in January 1962 by putting the 1961 Dodge Polara front end assembly on a version of the 1962 Chrysler Newport body.

The 1962 Dart, like the Plymouth, was on a new lightweight unibody "B" platform, featuring Chrysler's well-received "Torsion-Aire" torsion bar front suspension and asymmetric rear leaf springs. The rigidity gained through the nearly pure unibody platform combined with the suspension's low unsprung weight and near-ideal geometry provided sound handling, braking, and acceleration; the latter especially with the mid-year 415 hp (309 kW) "Ramcharger" 413 cu in (6.8 L) V8 which was aimed primarily at sanctioned drag racing, where it quickly broke performance records.

In 1961, a third-generation turbine engine (CR2A) was installed in a 1962 Dart, which successfully drove from New York City to Los Angeles, through snowstorms, rain and heavy winds.

The Dart's new B-body chassis platform was quite long-lived; while 1962 was the only year for a B-body model named "Dart", the B platform remained in use with only very slight modification and a few new letter designations through to the 1981 R-body cars.

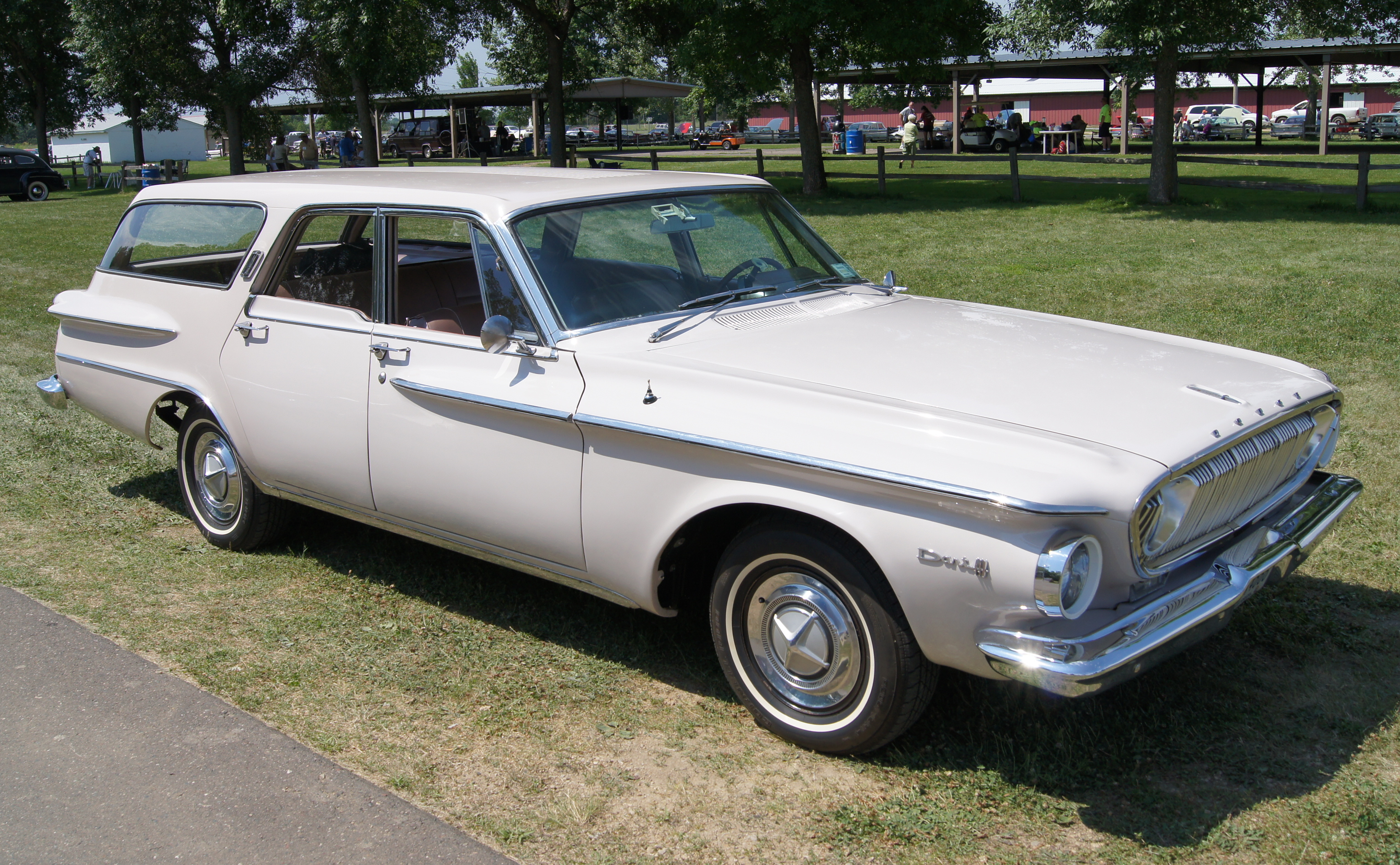
1962 Dart 440 wagon

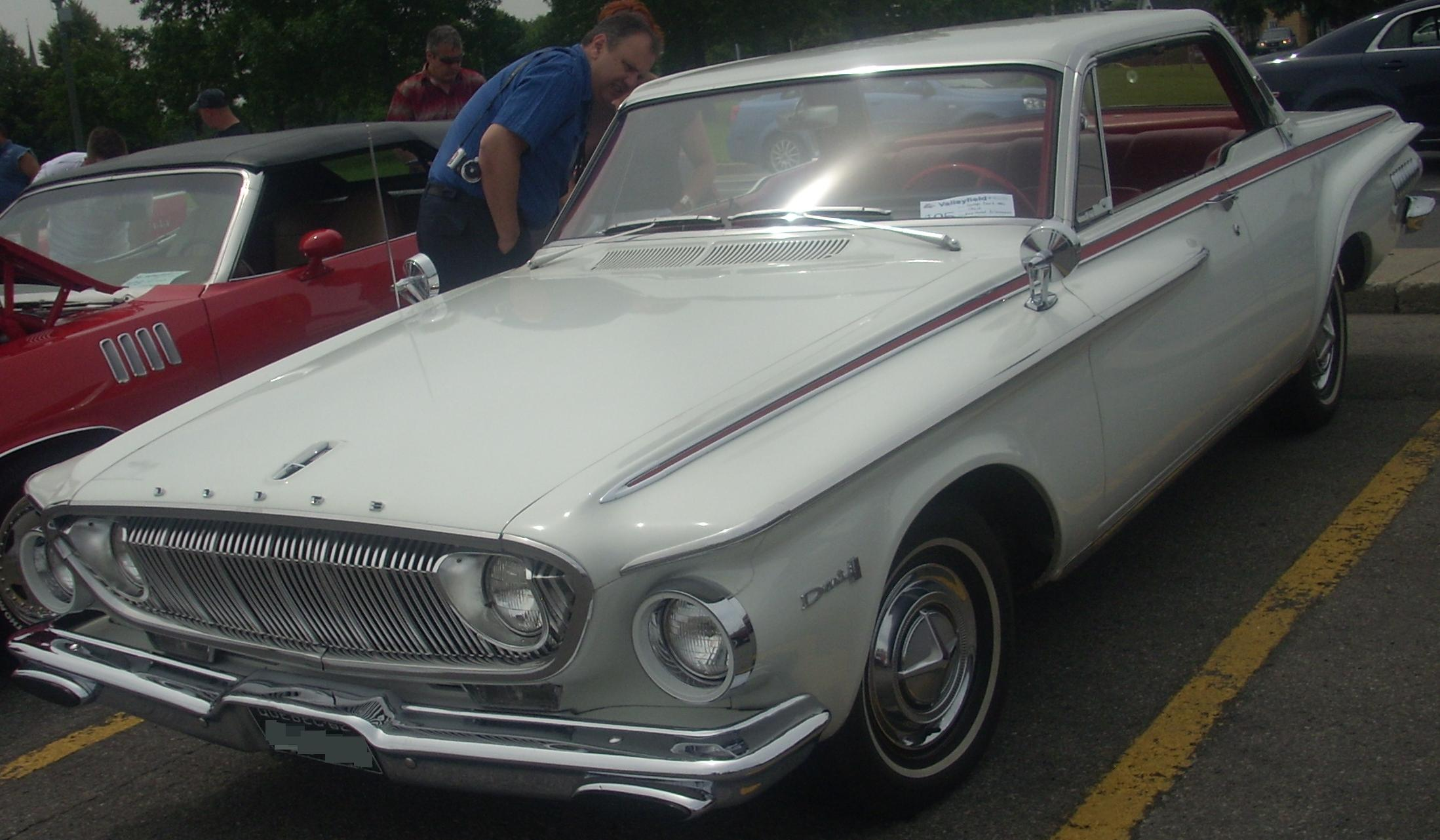
1962 Dart 440 2-door hardtop

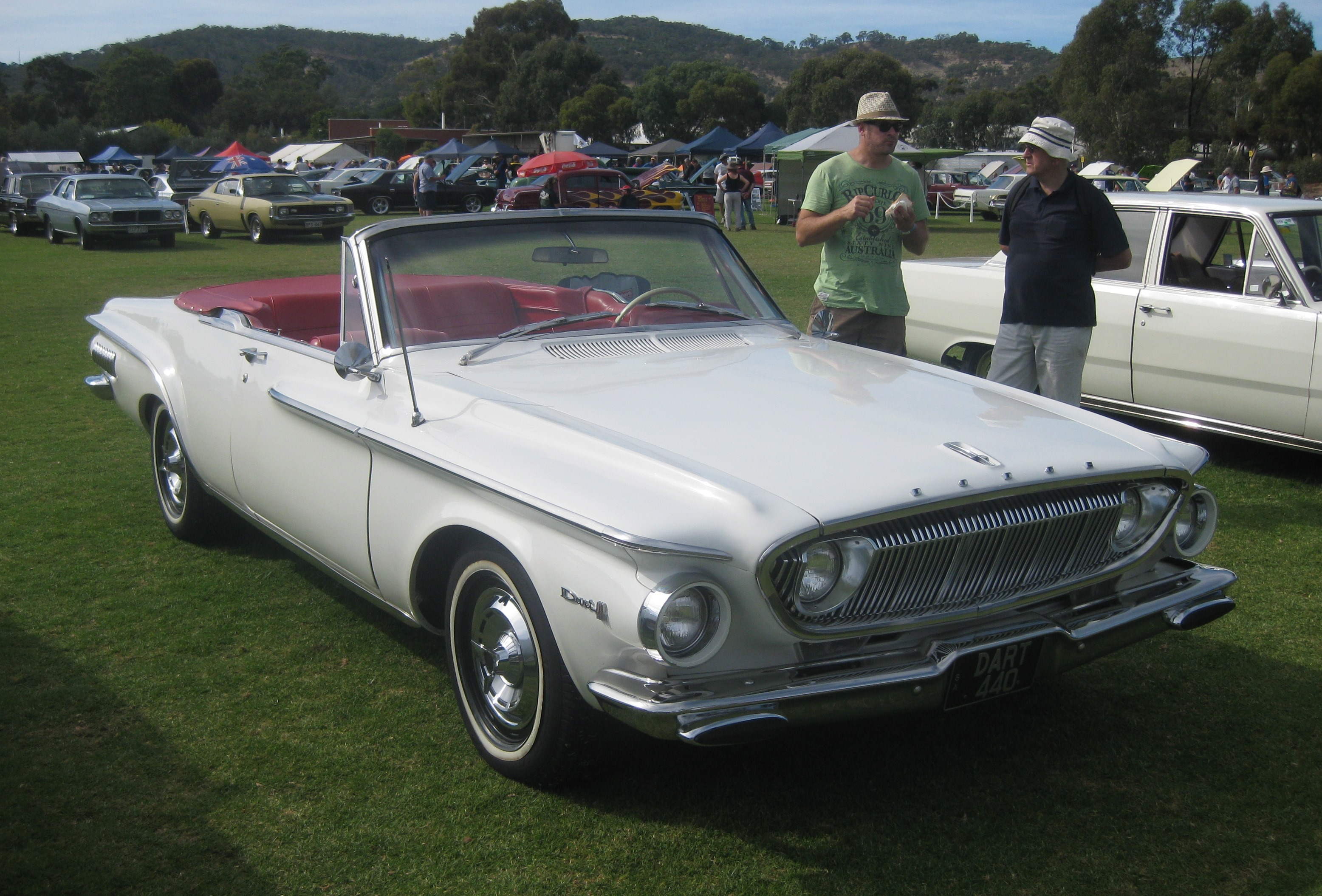
1962 Dart 440 convertible

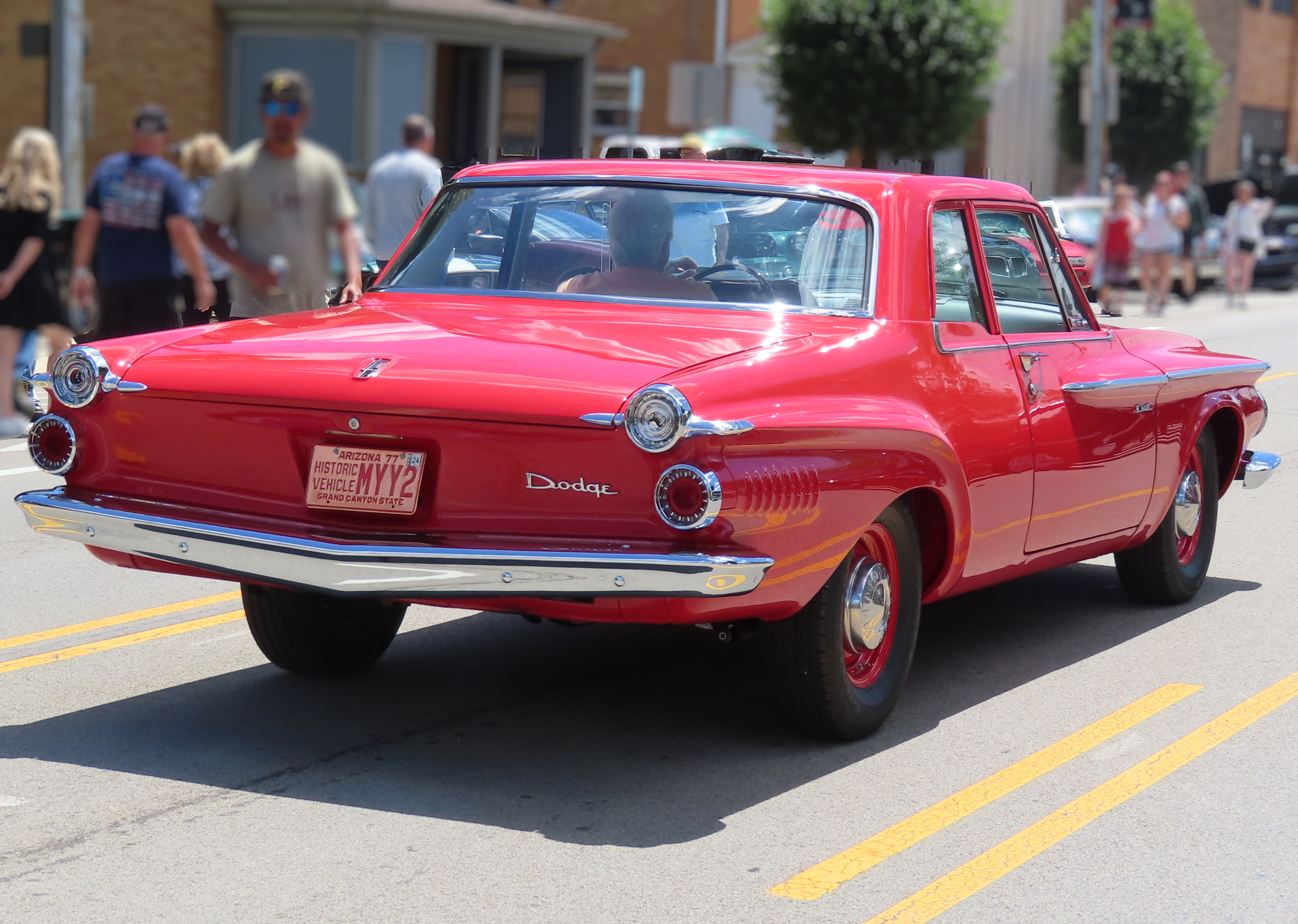
1962 Dart 2-door sedan, rear view

== Third generation (1963–1966) ==
Third generation
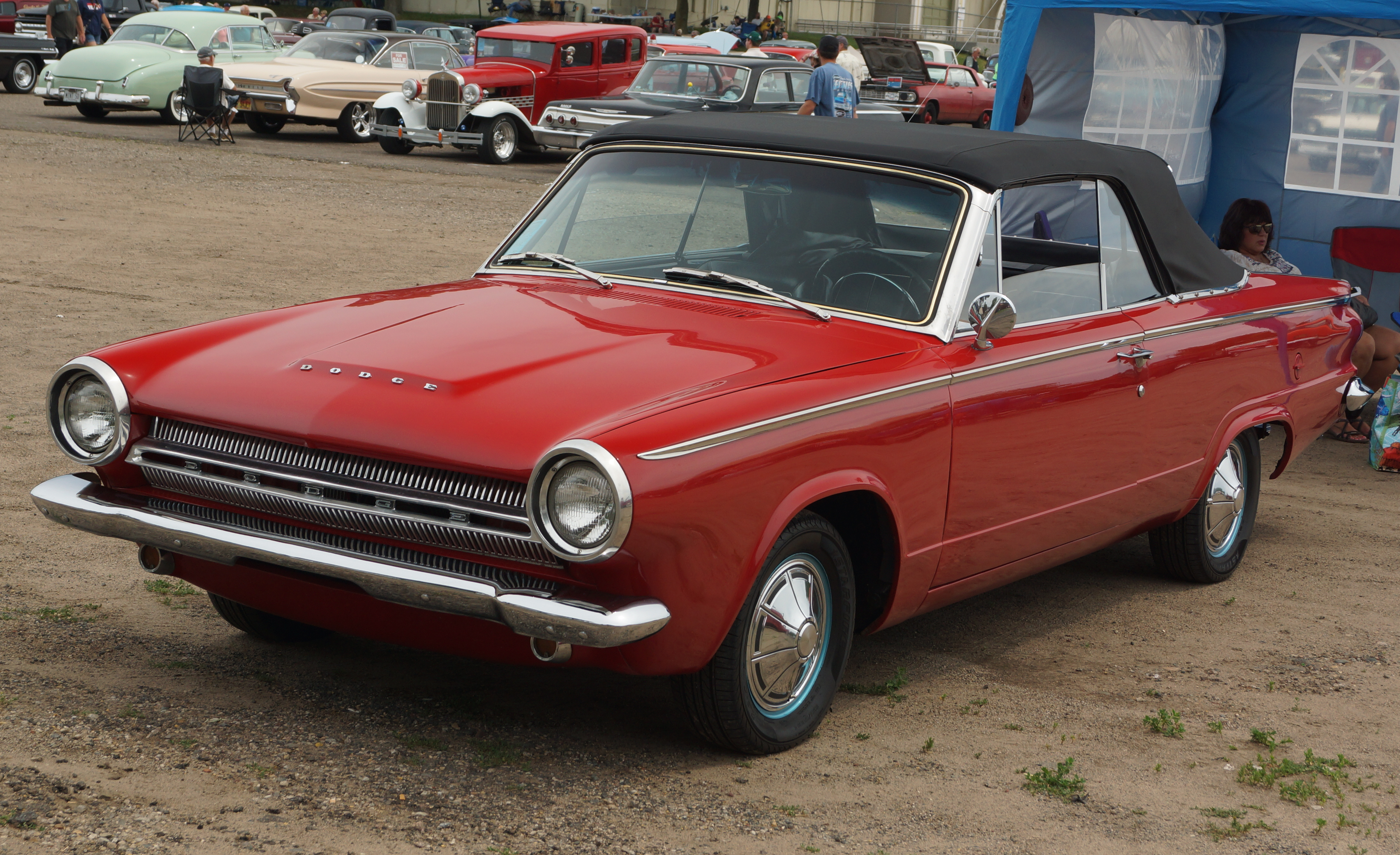
- 1964 Dart 2-door convertible

Overview
- Production: 1962–1966; 1965–1970 (Spain)
- Model years: 1963–1966 (North America)
- Assembly: United States: Belvidere, Illinois; United States: Hamtramck, Michigan; United States: Los Angeles, California; United States: St. Louis, Missouri; Argentina: Buenos Aires; Spain: Villaverde, Madrid; Mexico: Mexico City

Body and chassis
- Body style: 2/4-door sedan 4-door wagon 2-door hardtop 2-door convertible
- Platform: A-body
- Related: Plymouth Valiant; Plymouth Barracuda; Chrysler Valiant

Powertrain
- Engine: 170 cu in (2.8 L) slant-6 I6; 225 cu in (3.7 L) slant-6 I6; 273 cu in (4.5 L) LA V8
- Transmission: 3/4-speed manual 3-speed Torqueflite automatic

Dimensions
- Wheelbase: 111 in (2,819 mm); Wagon: 106 in (2,692 mm)
- Length: 196 in (4,978 mm); Wagon: 190 in (4,826 mm)
- Width: 70.8 in (1,798 mm)
- Height: 55.9 in (1,420 mm)

For 1963, Dodge made a last-minute decision to drop the Lancer name in favor of Dart for Dodge's newly designed "senior compact", a marketing term referring to the wheelbase having grown to 111 in (2,819 mm) from the Lancer's 106.5 in (2,705 mm). This longer wheelbase used the same A-body suspension of the Valiant and defunct Lancer, and would underpin all Darts from 1963 to 1976 except the 1963–1966 station wagons which used the Valiant's (106 in (2,692 mm) wheelbase) and the 1971–1976 Demon/Sport which used the Plymouth Duster's 108 in (2,743 mm) wheelbase. The longer wheelbase gave more rear seat legroom than the previous Lancer or the contemporaneous Valiant. The Dart was available as a 2- or 4-door sedan, a 2-door hardtop coupe, a station wagon, and a convertible. Three trim levels were offered: the low-spec 170, the high-spec 270, and the premium GT, which was available only as a 2-door hardtop or convertible. The 1963 Dart has a turning diameter of 38.9 ft (11.9 m).

The Dart was an instant market success, with 1963 sales up sharply compared to those of the 1962 Lancer. The Dart remained extremely popular through the end of the Dart's production run in 1976 in comparison to the Ford Falcon and the Chevrolet Nova.

Initial engine offerings were two sizes of the slant-six: a 170 cu in (2.8 L), 101 hp (75 kW) version was fitted as standard equipment, and a 225 cu in (3.7 L), 145 hp (108 kW) version was available for less than $50 extra. The aluminum engine block for the 225 was discontinued early in the 1963 model year. After the start of the 1964 model year, an all-new, compact, lightweight 273 cu in (4.5 L) LA V8 producing 180 bhp (130 kW) with a 2-barrel carburetor was introduced as the top engine option. 1964 was the last year for pushbutton control of the optional Torqueflite automatic transmission, so 1963 and 1964 models were the only compact Darts so equipped. Standard axle ratios in 1964 were 2.93:1 with automatic transmission and 225 engine, or 3.23:1 with manual transmission and 225 engine, or with 170 engine and either transmission. A 3.55:1 ratio was optional. New features included stronger door locks and a refined automatic choke.

In 1965, the 2-barrel 273 remained available, but a new performance version of the 273 engine was released with a 4-barrel carburetor, 10.5:1 compression, a more aggressive camshaft with solid tappets, and other upgrades which increased output to 235 bhp (175 kW). At the same time, the Dart Charger was offered. The Dart Chargers were yellow Dart GT hardtops with black interiors, Charger 273 engines, (Plymouth called their 4 barrel 273 Commando), premium mechanical and trim specifications, and special "Charger" badging. They were the first Dodge models to bear the "Charger" name. The following year the larger B-body Dodge Charger was introduced, and the "Charger" name was thenceforth associated with Dart models only in the "Charger 225" marketing name for the optional larger 6-cylinder engine.

Other new options for 1965 included upgraded suspension components and larger 14 in (356 mm) wheels and tires. Factory-installed air conditioning became available after the start of the 1965 model year, as well as disc brakes, which required the 14 in (356 mm) wheels to clear the calipers. Front seat belts became standard.

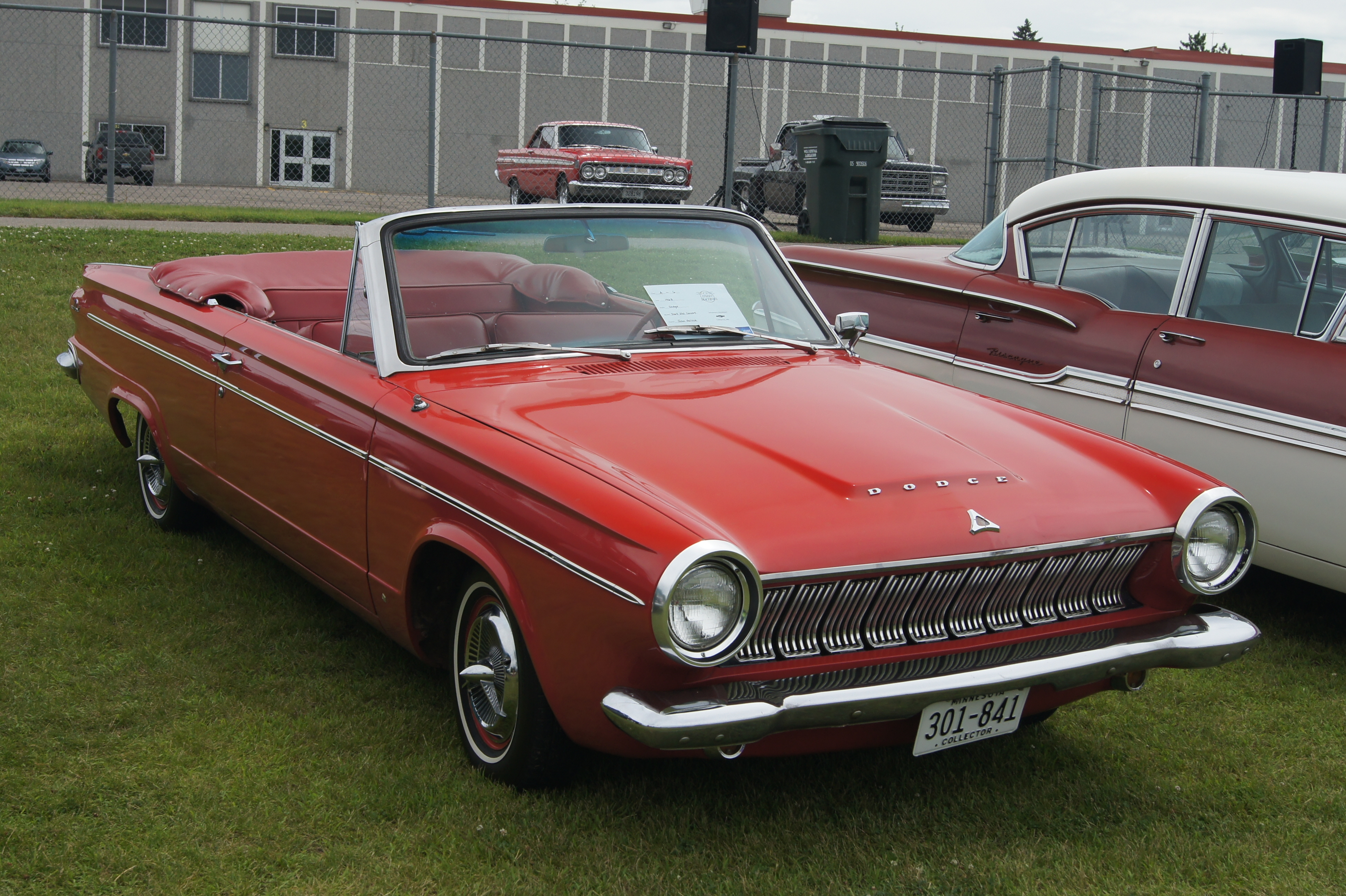
1963 Dart 270 convertible

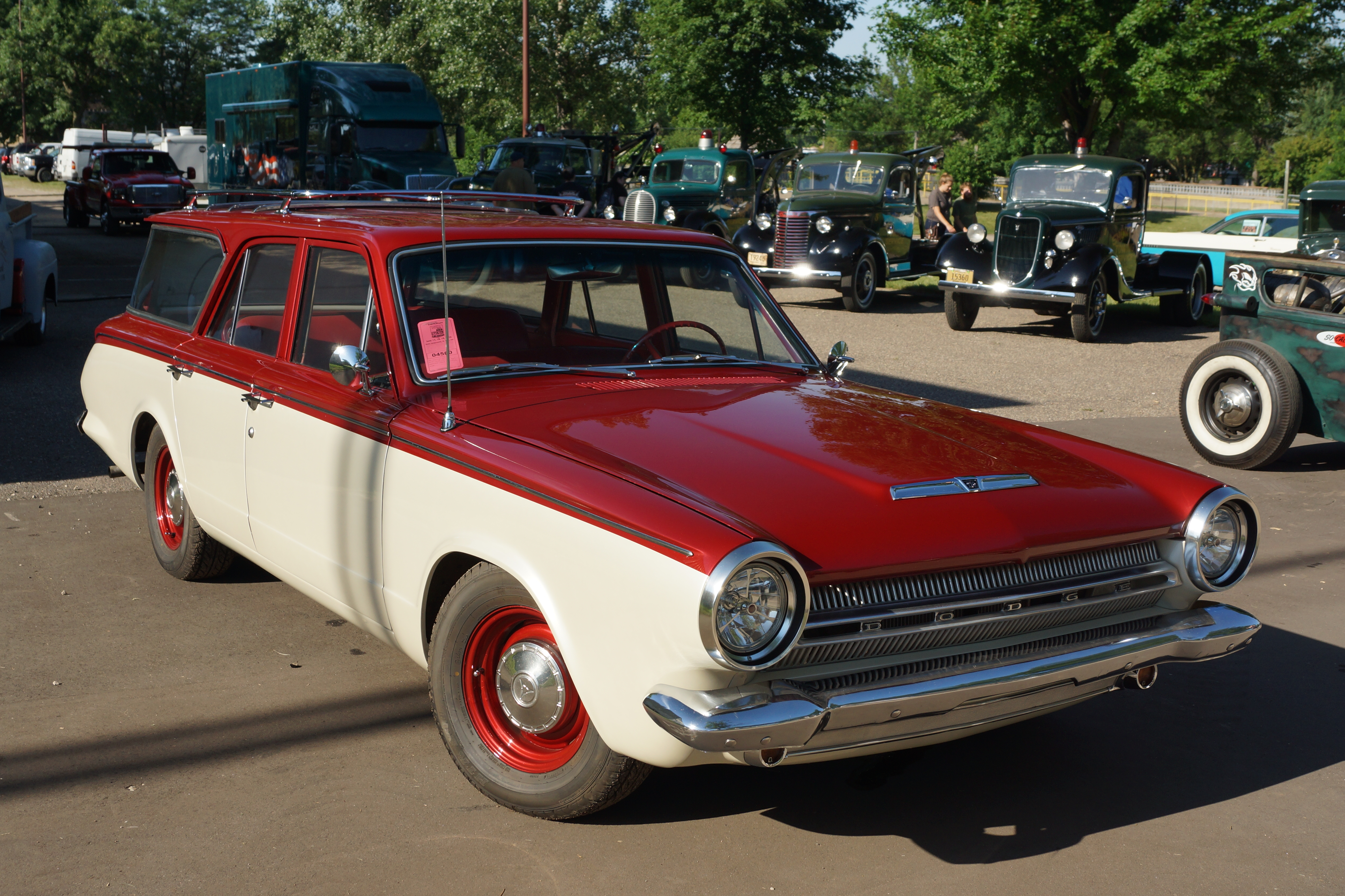
1964 Dart 270 station wagon

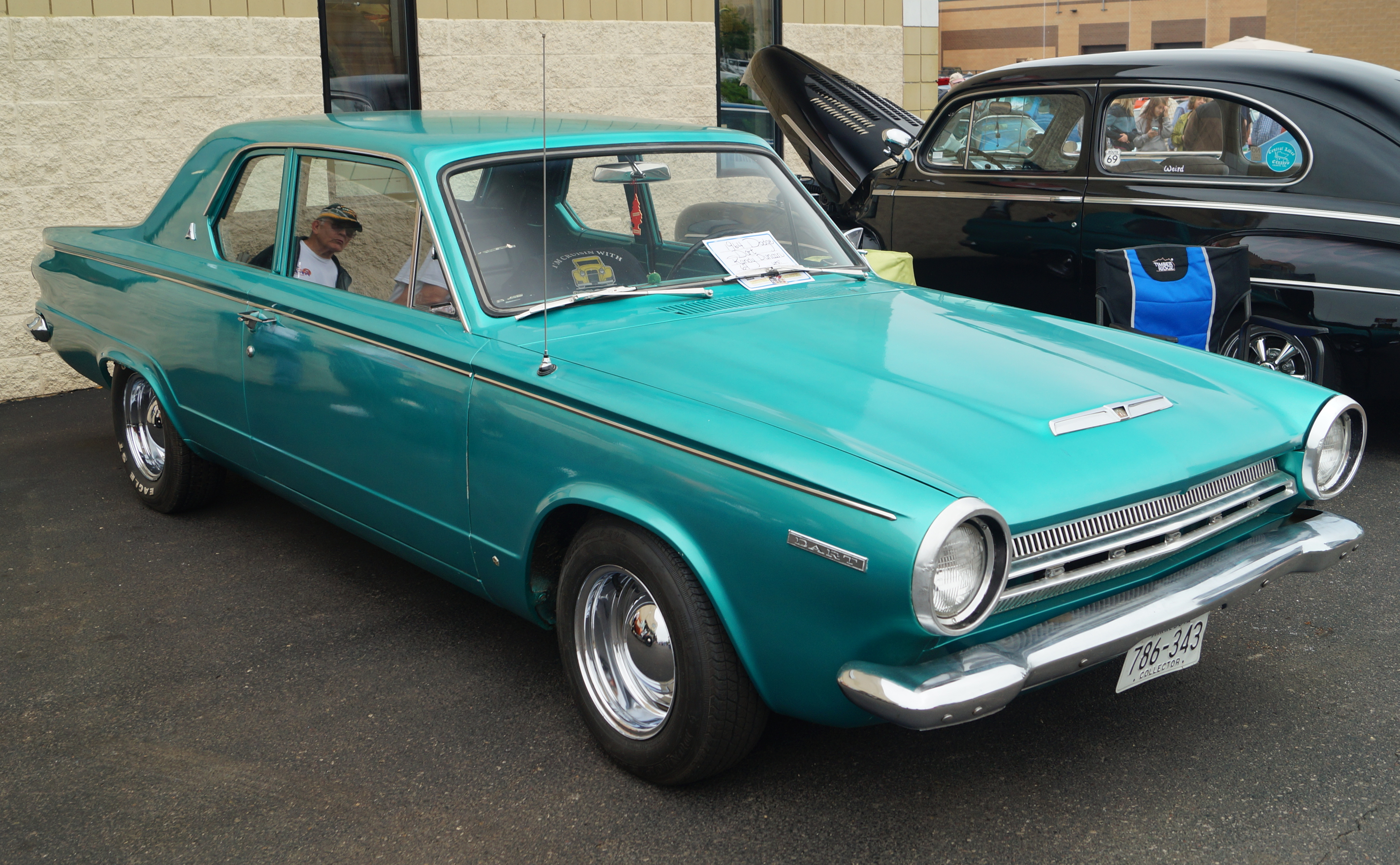
1964 Dart 2-door hardtop

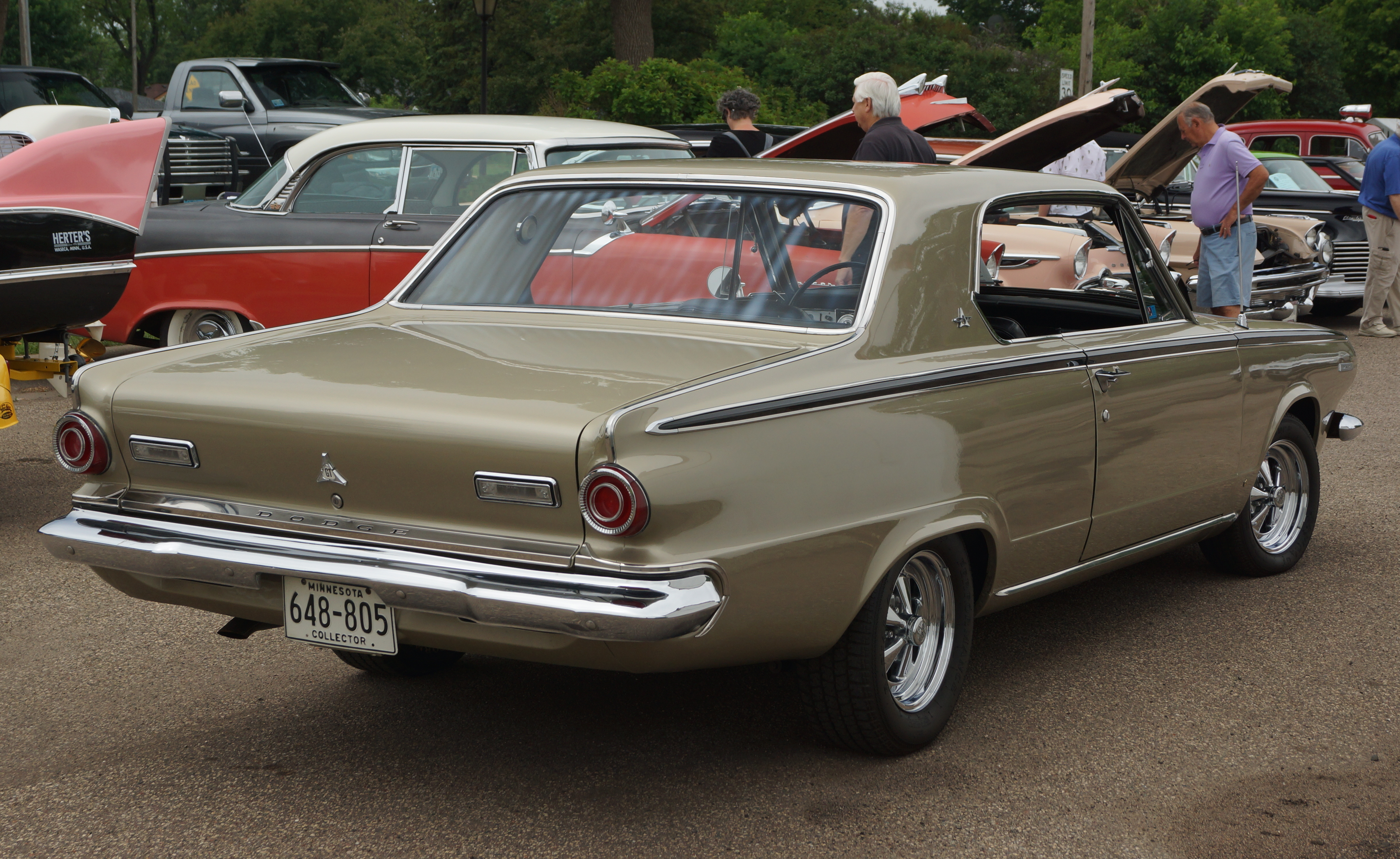
1964 Dart GT 2-door hardtop rear view

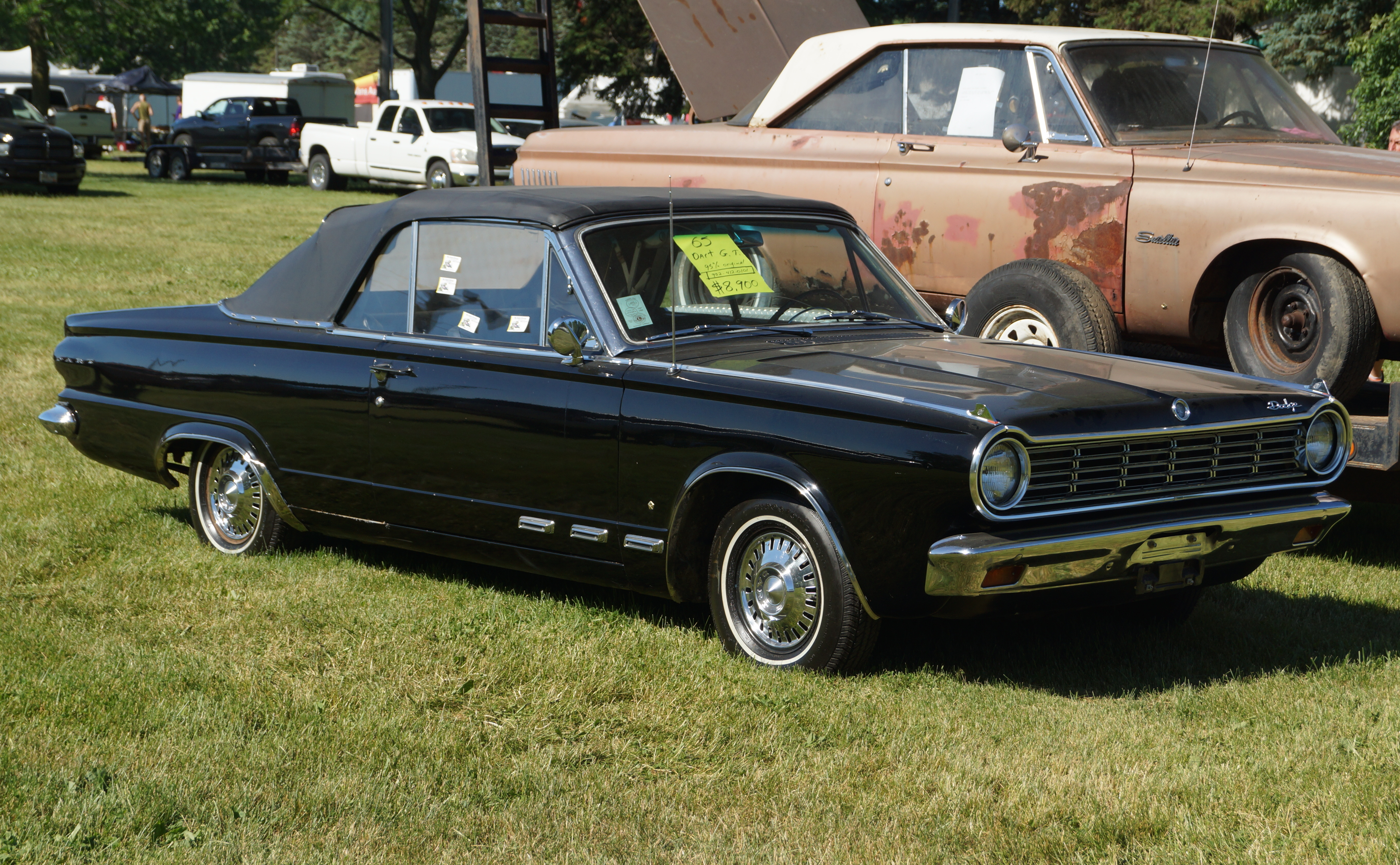
1965 Dart GT convertible

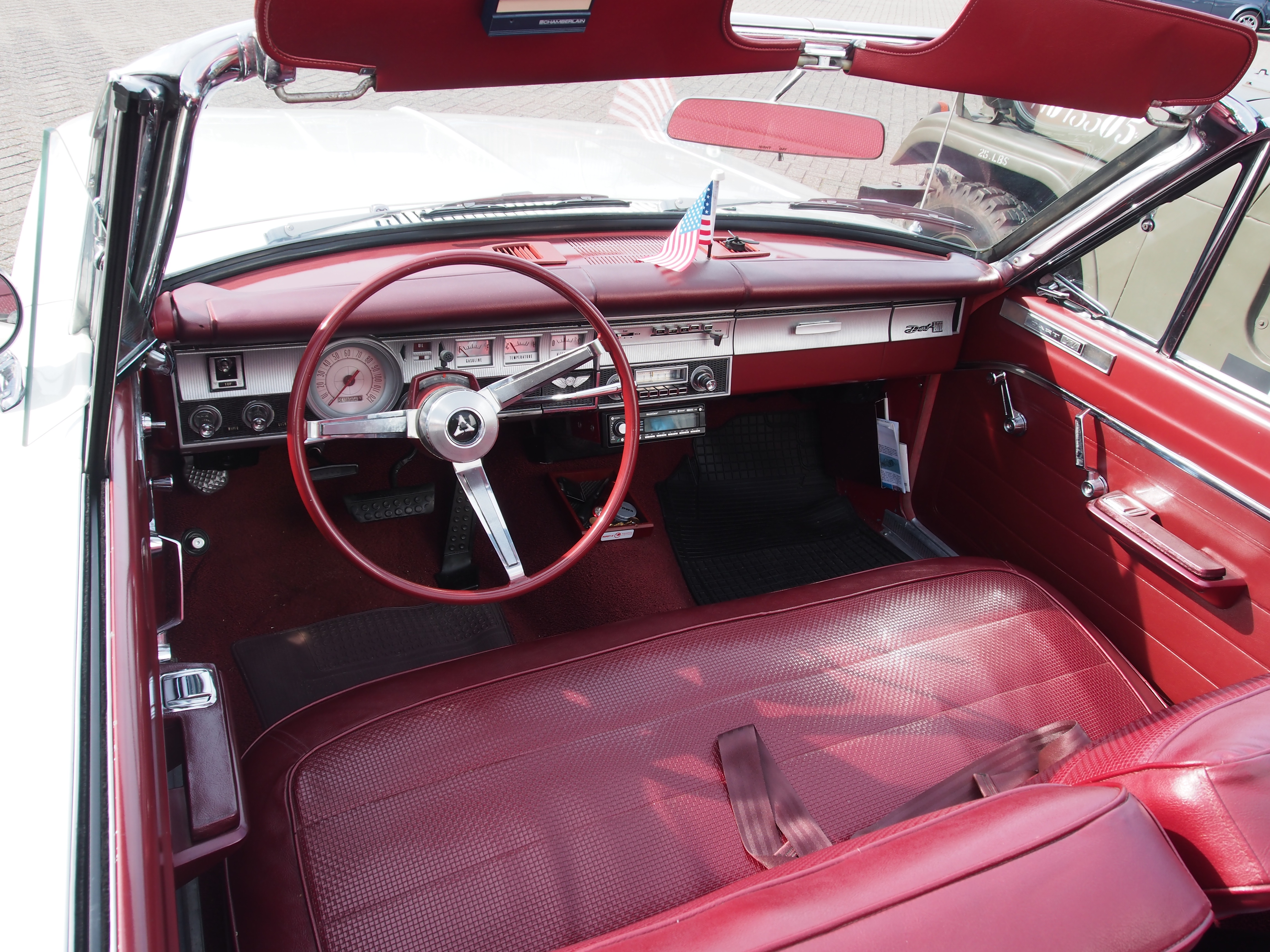
1965 Dart convertible interior

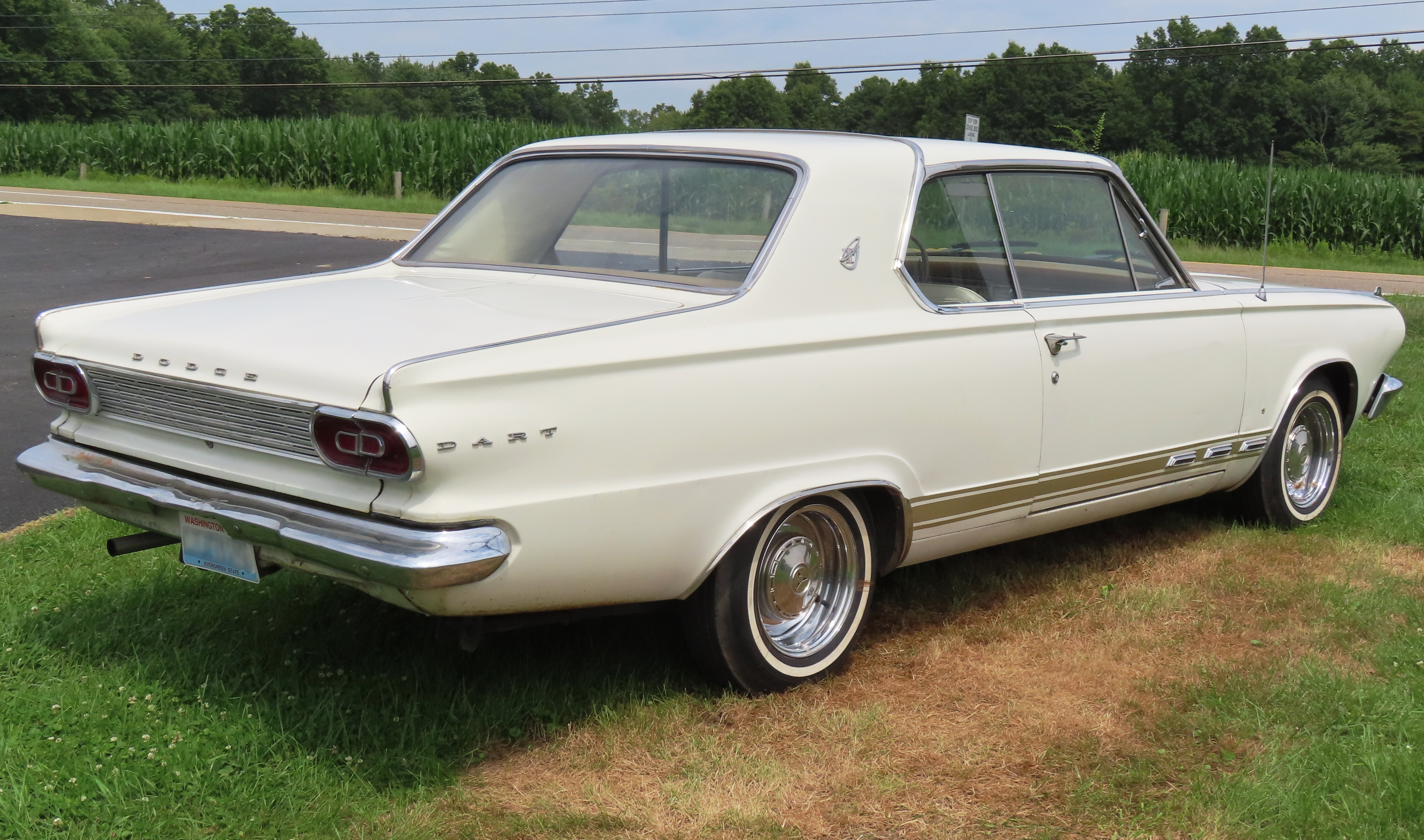
1965 Dart GT 2-door hardtop, rear

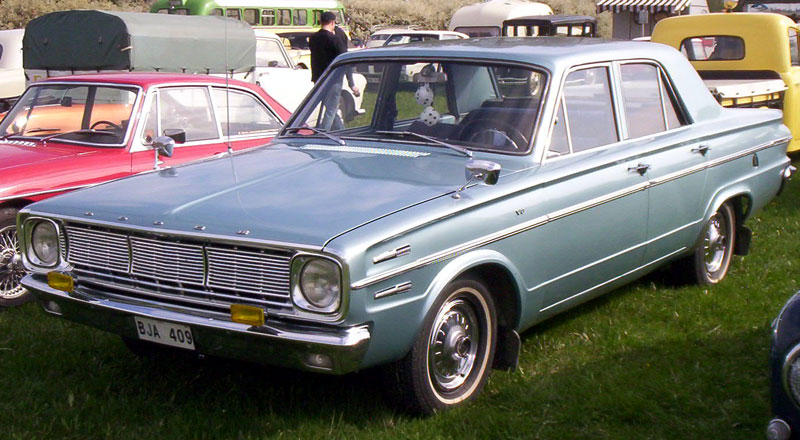
1966 Dart sedan

== Fourth generation (1967–1976) ==
Fourth generation
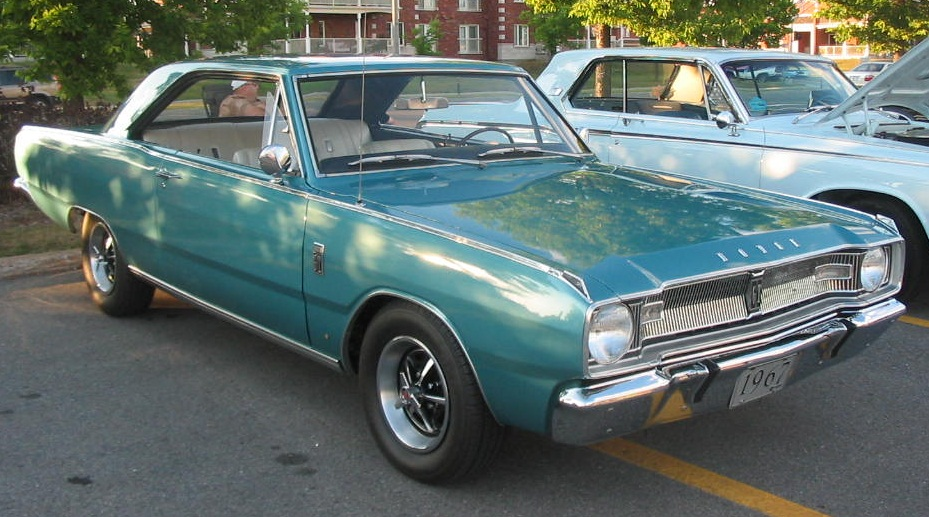
- 1967 Dart hardtop

Overview
- Also called: Dodge Dart Sport; Dodge Charger (Brazil)
- Production: 1966–1976; 1969–1981 (Brazil)
- Model years: 1967–1976 (North America); 1970–1981 (Brazil)
- Assembly: United States: Belvidere, Illinois; United States: Hamtramck, Michigan; United States: Los Angeles, California; United States: St. Louis, Missouri; Canada: Windsor, Ontario; Mexico: Mexico City; Brazil: São Bernardo do Campo; Colombia: Bogotá

Body and chassis
- Body style: 4-door sedan (1967–1976); 2-door sedan (1967–1969); 2-door hardtop (1967–1976); 2-door coupe (1971–1976); 2-door convertible (1967–1969)
- Platform: A-body
- Related: Plymouth Valiant; Plymouth Barracuda; Chrysler Valiant; Dodge Polara (Argentina)

Powertrain
- Engine: 170 cu in (2.8 L) Slant-6; 198 cu in (3.2 L) Slant-6; 225 cu in (3.7 L) Slant-6; 273 cu in (4.5 L) LA V8; 318 cu in (5.2 L) LA V8; 340 cu in (5.6 L) LA V8; 360 cu in (5.9 L) LA V8; 383 cu in (6.3 L) RB V8; 426 cu in (7.0 L) 2G Hemi V8 (1968 S/S); 440 cu in (7.2 L) RB V8
- Transmission: 4-speed manual 3-speed manual 3-speed Torqueflite automatic

Dimensions
- Wheelbase: 111 in (2,819 mm); Demon/Sport: 108 in (2,743 mm)
- Length: Varied by model year: 196.2 in (4,983 mm) to 203.8 in (5,177 mm); Demon/Sport: 192.5 in (4,890 mm) to 200.9 in (5,103 mm)
- Width: 71.6 in (1,819 mm); Demon/Sport: 71.6 in (1,819 mm)
- Height: 54 in (1,372 mm)
- Curb weight: 1,315–1,590 kg (2,899–3,505 lb)

=== Engines ===
The 170 cu in (2.8 L) Slant-6 engine remained standard equipment, though its power rating rose from 101 bhp (75 kW) to 115 bhp (86 kW) for 1967, owing to the installation of the 225 engine's 1 barrel Carter BBD or Holley 1904 series carburetor and the revised camshaft the bigger engine had received in 1965. For North American domestic-market vehicles, the base 170 engine was replaced for 1970 with a stronger new 198 cu in (3.2 L) version of the slant-6. This new base engine was also less costly to make, for unlike the previous 170 engine, the 198 used the same block as the 225. The smaller displacement was achieved with a new crankshaft (3.64 in (92 mm) stroke vs. the 4.125 in (104.8 mm) stroke of the 225 crank) and connecting rods (7.006 in (178.0 mm) long vs. the 6.67 in (169 mm) rods in the 225). Nevertheless, the 225 remained an upgrade option. The 2-barrel 273 cu in (4.5 L) small-block V8 was supplanted on the option list in 1968 by a 318 cu in (5.2 L) 2-barrel engine. The 318 was rated at 230 bhp (172 kW) versus the 2-barrel carbureted 273's 180 bhp (134 kW). At the same time the 4-barrel carbureted 273 235 bhp (175 kW) was replaced on the options list by the 275 bhp (205 kW) 4-barrel carbureted 340 cu in (5.6 L) available only in the 1968–1972 Swinger and the hottest Dart, the performance-oriented GTS models. The Dart GTS came standard with the 340 cu in (5.6 L) V8. A 300 hp (224 kW) 383 cu in (6.3 L) big-block was optional.

=== 1967 ===
The Dart and its sister model—the Plymouth Valiant—were substantially redesigned for the 1967 model year. In addition to new styling, the cars received revised steering systems, wider front track and frame rail spacing, and redesigned K-members capable of accepting larger engines. The Dart kept this basic form, with facelifts consisting of revised front and rear-end styling and interior trim, until the end of A-body production in 1976 for North America and 1981 for South America.

The restyled Dart for 1967 featured a rear window with compound inverse curves. This created a unique appearance at the rear of the greenhouse, but tended to collect snow and created thick C-pillars that looked formal but created blind spots for drivers. Curved side glass was used for the first time on a Chrysler compact. The front featured a new dual-plane front end contour: the center section of the grille, bumper, and leading edge of the hood were recessed from the front plane of the car. The single headlamps were placed forward of the recessed center section, defining the front plane. Park/turn lamps were set into the grille, in the corners formed by the transition area between the recessed and forward sections.

With the new design, changes were made to the Dart lineup, beginning with the elimination of its station wagons and the base model's "170" designation. The only body styles were the 2- and 4-door sedans, the hardtop, and the convertible. The base 170 model was now badged simply as "Dart". The 270 and GT versions carried on unchanged for the most part. In late 1967, the GTS model debuted but was built in limited quantities due to its lateness in the model year; the 1968 GTS was, arguably, improved by fitting the new high-output 340 cu in (5.6 L) V8 as standard equipment.

The 1967 Dart, along with all other 1967 Chrysler products, got a new dual-circuit brake hydraulic system to ensure a loss of pressure in the front brakes would not prevent the rear brakes from working, and vice versa. The system also incorporated a brake system fault telltale on the dashboard. Other changes to comply with new federal safety laws included collapsible steering columns, additional padding on the dashboard and sun visors. Shoulder belt anchors were also provided for front outboard occupants.

The 1967 redesign removed all traces of the older Virgil Exner styling that proved less popular by the early 1960s. The newer body was trimmer and proved extremely popular, causing sales of the Dart to surpass compacts from Ford and GM.

==== 1968 ====
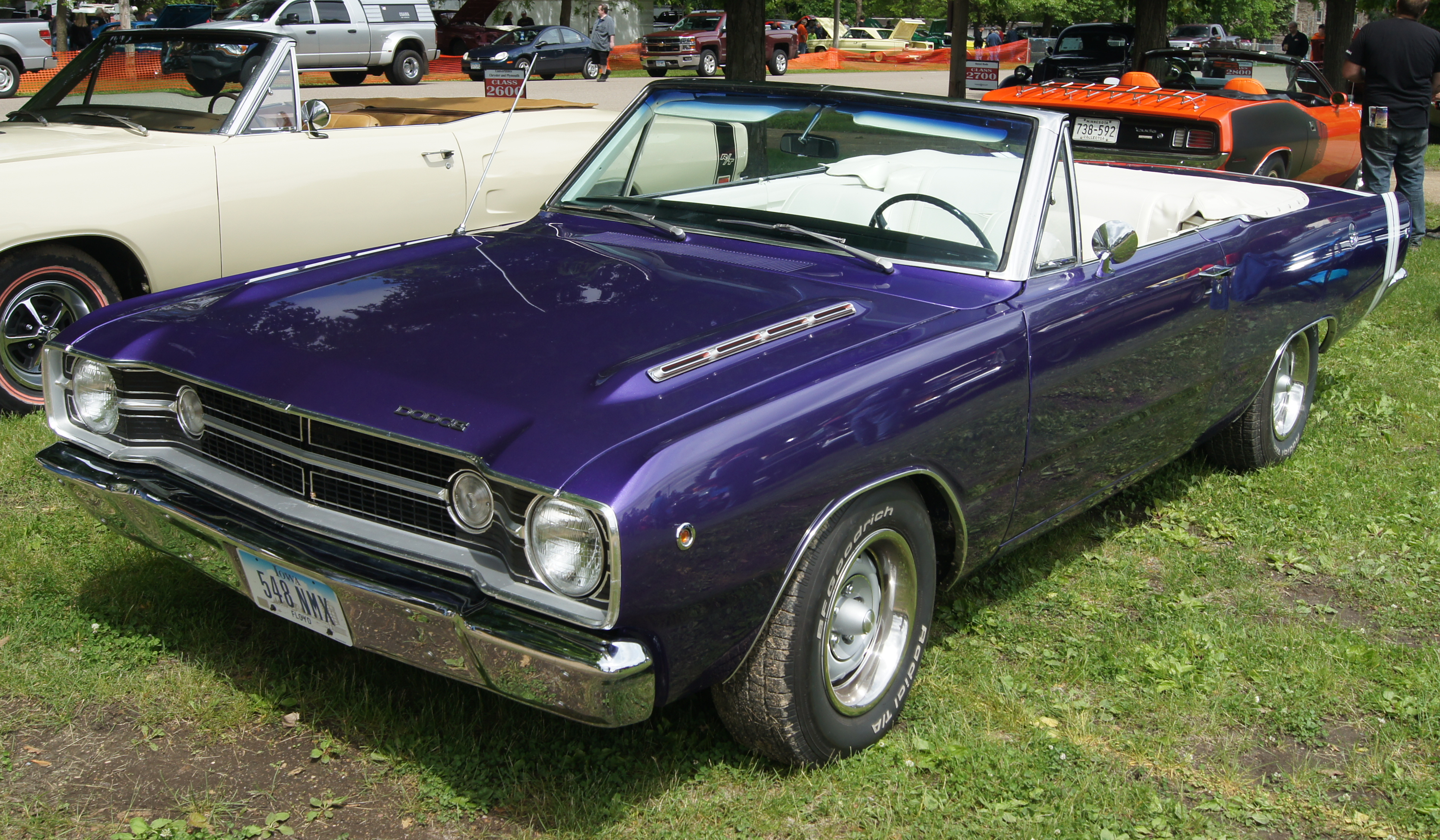
1968 Dart GT convertible

Changes for 1968 were relatively subtle. The park and turn lights in the grille were moved slightly inboard and made round. Side marker lights were added to the front fenders and rear quarter panels, to comply with newly introduced Federal Motor Vehicle Safety Standard 108. Shoulder harnesses (separate, this year and until 1973, from the lap belts) and non-glare matte finish on the windshield wiper arms were also part of the 1968 federally mandated safety package. Chrysler's "clean air package" emission control system became standard equipment on cars sold in all 50 states. The steering linkage was revised again, as were the windshield and rear window gaskets and trim-lock strips, leaving the 1967 pieces as one-year-only items. The standard rear axle ratio was dropped from 2.93 to 2.76 with all standard-performance engines and automatic transmission. Part-throttle downshift functionality was added as a refinement to the TorqueFlite automatic transmission in 6-cylinder cars, to retain acceptable city performance with the taller rear axle ratio.

=== Hemi Dart ===
A limited option for 1968 only, code L023, the Hurst-reworked Hemi Darts used the 426 cu in (7.0 L) Hemi engine. These special models (only 80 were made) were created strictly for drag racing, and included a non-warranty disclaimer. On February 20, 1968, corporate headquarters in Highland Park, Michigan, sent out a press release to Dodge dealerships. It was a promotional pitch purposed at selling drag-ready, Hemi-powered Darts. The press release stated that Dodge wanted to make a factory-built and ready drag racer out of the 68 Dart GTS hardtop for competition in class B Super Stock (drag racing). Engineers stated the new Hemi Dart reached speeds of 130 mph (209 km/h) in less than 11 seconds and 1/4 mi (402 m) times in the 10-11 second range, although times have been reported as low as the 9-10 second range.

To keep weight low, a fiberglass hood and fenders were used. The hood featured a functional intake scoop and four hood pins for full lift-off removal of the hood. Lightweight acid-dipped steel doors with thin side window glass were used. As the doors lacked a window mechanism, a strap was attached to the bottom of the glass on the interior door panel. To keep glass up, the strap latched to the inside of the door. The interior included only two bucket seats from a Dodge van. The center console, heater, sound deadeners, side-view mirrors, radio, carpeting, and even armrests were omitted to save weight.

The engine was a race-spec 426 Hemi. These motors had a compression ratio of 10.25:1 pistons, bore x stroke 4 1/4 in × 3 3/4 in (108.0 mm × 95.3 mm) fed through a 2X4-barrel Holley carburetors atop a lightweight crossram aluminum intake manifold rated at 425 hp (431 PS; 317 kW) at 5,000 rpm and a maximum torque of 490 lb⋅ft (664 N⋅m) at 4,000 rpm. A high-performance Mopar battery was moved to the trunk to free up room and improve weight distribution.

Darts could be ordered with either a four-speed manual or three-speed automatic transmissions. Manual transmission equipped cars, code A-833, featured a Dana 60 built heavy-duty axle with a 4.88 gear ratio, heavy-duty clutch, steel bellhousing, and special torque shaft and pivots. Manual transmissions were modified by removing synchronizers which lowered the chances of missed shifts. A Hurst floor-mounted shifter came standard.

The automatic transmissions were the then-new Chrysler-built 727 TorqueFlite three-speed with 8-3/4 inch large stem pinion center section with a 4.86 gear set, and a 2,600 rpm high speed torque converter. They were also modified with a floor-mounted Hurst shifter for manual shifting.

Other features include heavy-duty rear shocks, heavy-duty radiator with a seven-blade fan, and deep groove pulleys, a high capacity oil pump, solid-lifter cam, and a roller timing chain to reduce stretch and provide more reliable performance. A transistorized dual points breaker distributor coupled with a Prestolite ignition and solid core wires were also used.

The cars weighed approximately 3,000 lb (1,361 kg). The cars were designed to meet street legal requirements, but due to the modifications, the cars came with disclaimers that they were not for street use, but rather "supervised acceleration trials", or drag racing.

==== 1969 ====
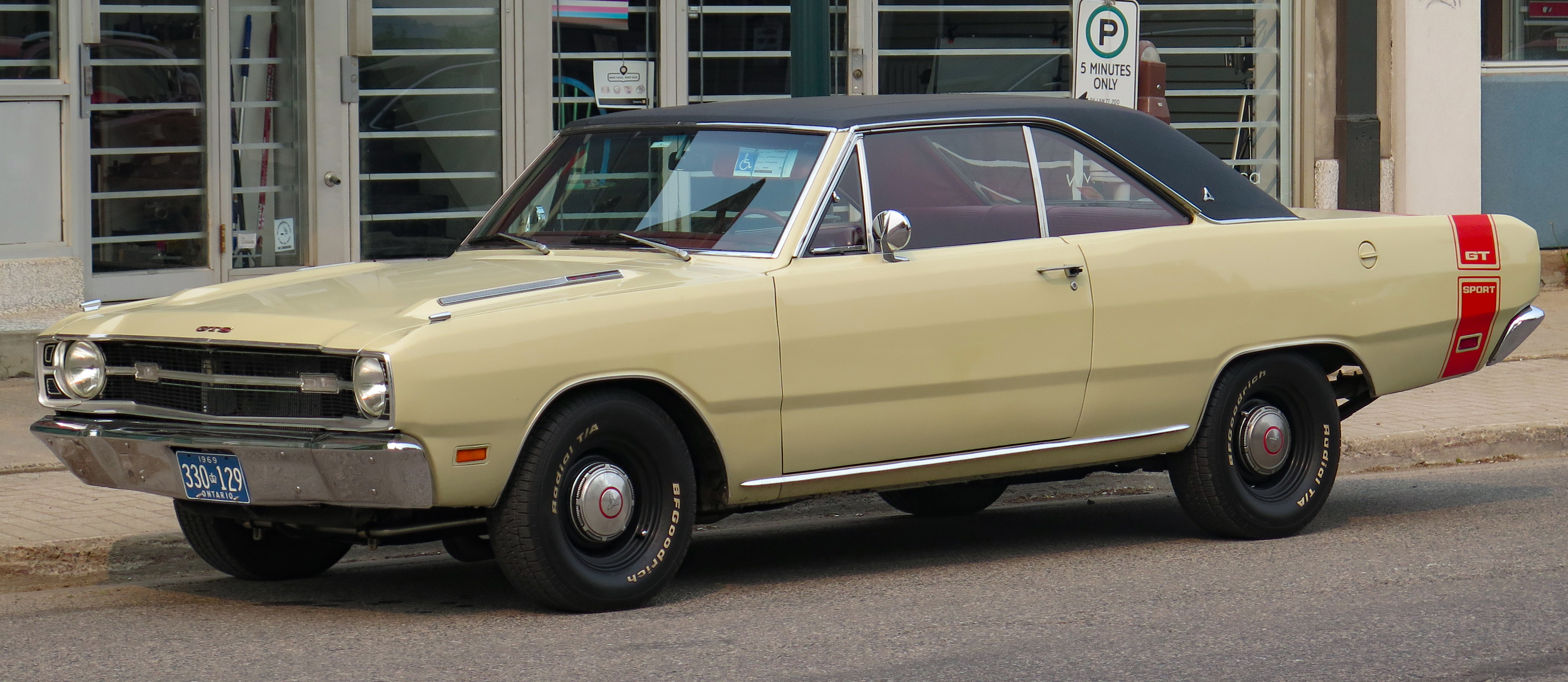
1969 Dart GTS

The 2-door sedan was dropped at the end of 1968 and replaced with the Swinger 2-door hardtop for 1969 available in Custom, GT, and GTS trim. Also added was the Swinger 340.

The entire 1969 Dart range received trim updates including another minor revision of the grille and a return to rectangular park/turn lights. The 1968 round side marker lights were replaced with rectangular reflectors. Head restraints were optional equipment until January 1, 1969, when their installation became mandatory under federal law. The 6-cylinder models received a carburetor anti-ice system borrowed from Canadian-market Chrysler 6-cylinder engines, and the drum brake automatic adjusters were revised for more consistent operation. At the top of the Dart performance range for 1969, there was limited availability of the 440 V8 in the Dart GTS model.

==== 1970 ====
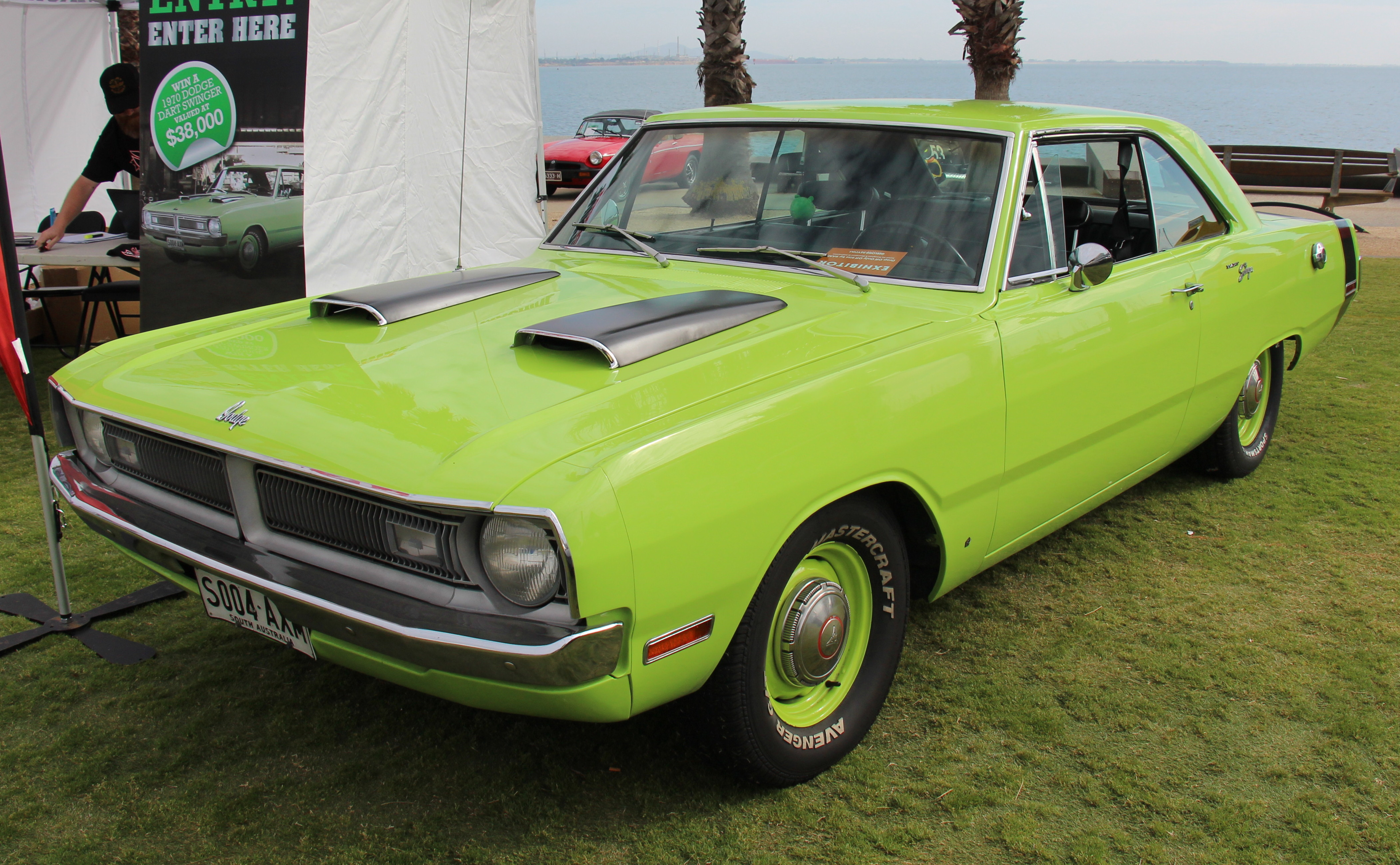
1970 Dart Swinger in Sublime Green

The Dart was refreshed for 1970 with front and rear changes designed to bring the car closer to the design themes found in Dodge's full-size vehicles through grille and contour changes. In the rear, the Dart's new rectangular tail lights were set into a wedge-shaped rear bumper design continuing the angled trailing edge of the new deck lid and quarter panels. The revised rear styling did not change the 14.1 cubic ft trunk space of the 1969 model. 14-inch wheels became standard equipment, and the 170 cu in (2.8 L) slant-6 was replaced by a larger 198 cu in (3.2 L) version for improved base-model performance and greater manufacturing economy—the 198 used the same block as the 225, while the 170 had used a different block. Changes to the fuel system improved drivability, economy, and emission control. Part-throttle downshift was added to the 8-cylinder automatic transmissions. In compliance with FMVSS 108, side marker lights and reflectors were installed at all four corners. 1970 Darts for the US and Canadian markets were built in Canada at the Windsor, Ontario, or Los Angeles, California assembly plant. All 1970 Darts got the federally mandated steering column and ignition lock.

The "Swinger" name was applied to all the Dart two-door hardtops except in the high-line custom series. Other changes were made to the Dart line to avoid internal competition with Dodge's new Challenger: the Dart convertible was discontinued along with the optional 383 cu in (6.3 L) V8, leaving the 275 bhp (205 kW) 340 4-barrel V8 as the top Dart engine.

The performance model in the Dart line for 1970 was the Swinger 340 2-door hardtop. The 1970 Swinger 340 came with functional hood scoops with 340 emblems. Standard equipment included front disc brakes (only on the Swinger), heavy-duty "Rallye" suspension, a 3.23:1 rear axle ratio, fiberglass-belted bias-ply tires mounted to 14 × 5½ inch steel wheels, and a bumblebee stripe. Optional equipment included an upgrade over the standard bench seat with all-vinyl bucket seats, with which a center console could be ordered. A performance hood upgrade with scoops was painted flat black with hood tie-down pins. Mechanical options included power-assisted brakes and steering. Rallye wheels and wire wheel covers were also optional, as was a 6000 rpm tachometer and a vinyl roof covering in black or white.

==== 1971 ====
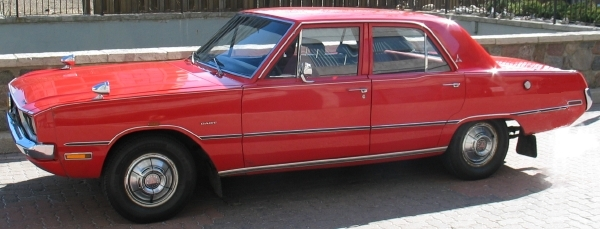
1971 Dart sedan with aftermarket fender mirrors

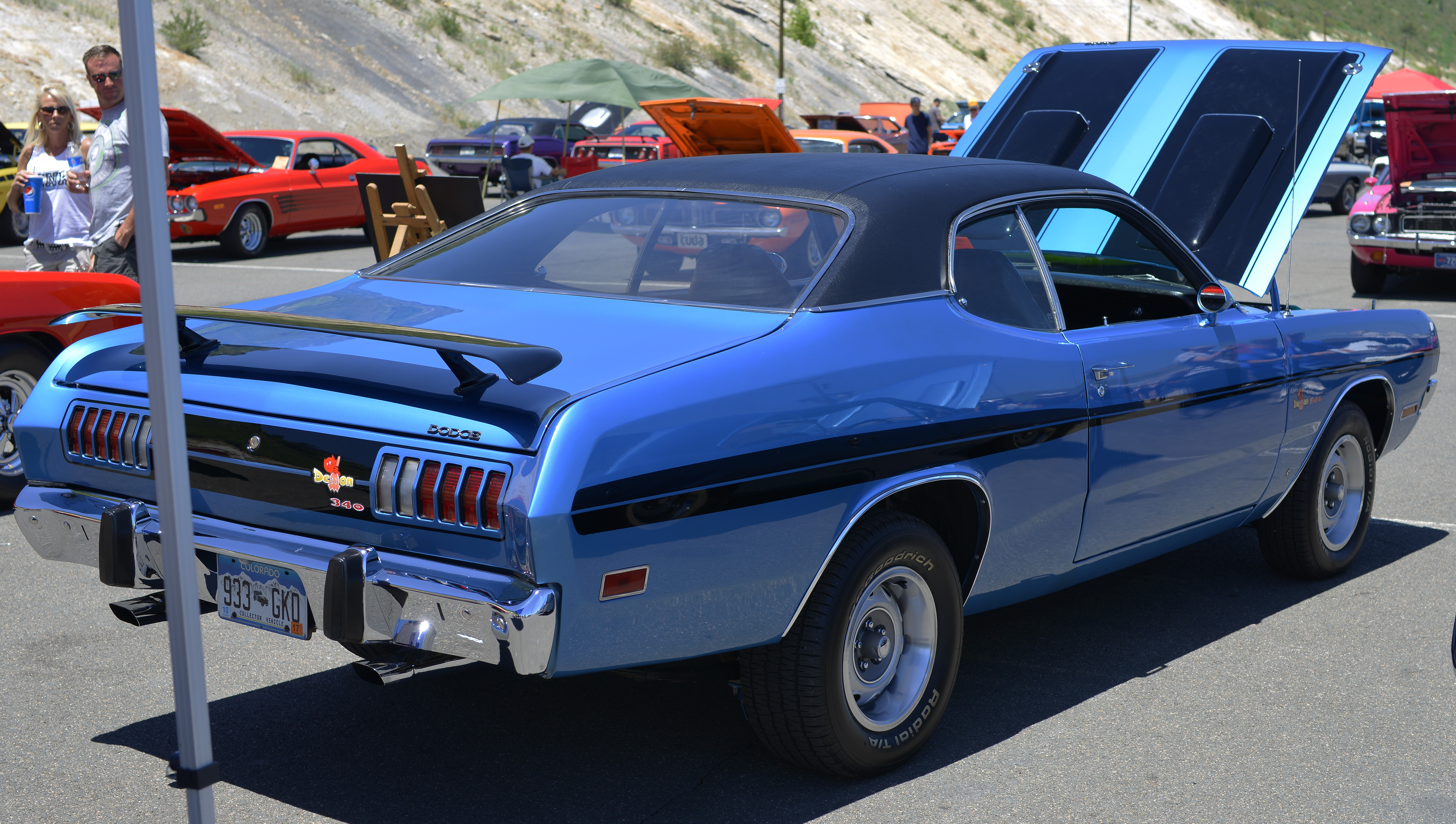
1971 Demon 340 in B5 Blue

For 1971, Chrysler introduced a 2-door hardtop in the Valiant line called the Scamp. It was the same car as the Swinger with a Valiant front clip. The 1970 Dart's dual tail lamps were given over to the badge-engineered Scamp, while the 1971 Dart received new smaller quad taillamps that would be used through 1973. The custom 2-door hardtop coupe became the Swinger, and the standard Swinger became the Swinger Special. Dodge gained a version of Plymouth's popular Valiant-based fastback Duster which was to be named the Beaver, but when Chrysler's marketing department learned that "beaver" was CB slang for vagina, the vehicle was renamed the "Dart Demon".

As was the case with previous Dodge rebadges of Plymouth Valiants, such as the 1961–1962 Lancer, sales of the Demon lagged behind those of the Duster. With optional hood scoops and blackout hood treatment, the car was advertised as a performance car. The Demon's Dart-type front fender wheel lips and Duster-type rear wheel fender lips reveal the car was essentially a Duster with Dart front sheet metal and other minor styling changes. A new audio option became available for 1971: Chrysler's cassette-recorder. Unlike the 8-track tapes, the cassette player was relatively compact, and it was mounted on the console or on its own floor-mount casing. This unit offered an available microphone in which one could record their own dictation.

The Swinger 340, Dart's performance model, was replaced by the Demon 340, 275 HP engine with an optional 4-speed manual transmission, optional hood scoops, and blackout hood treatment. In 1971, Chrysler ended their longstanding corporate practice of installing left-hand-threaded wheel studs on the left side of the vehicle; all-wheel studs on the Dart thenceforth used conventional right-hand threads.

==== 1972 ====
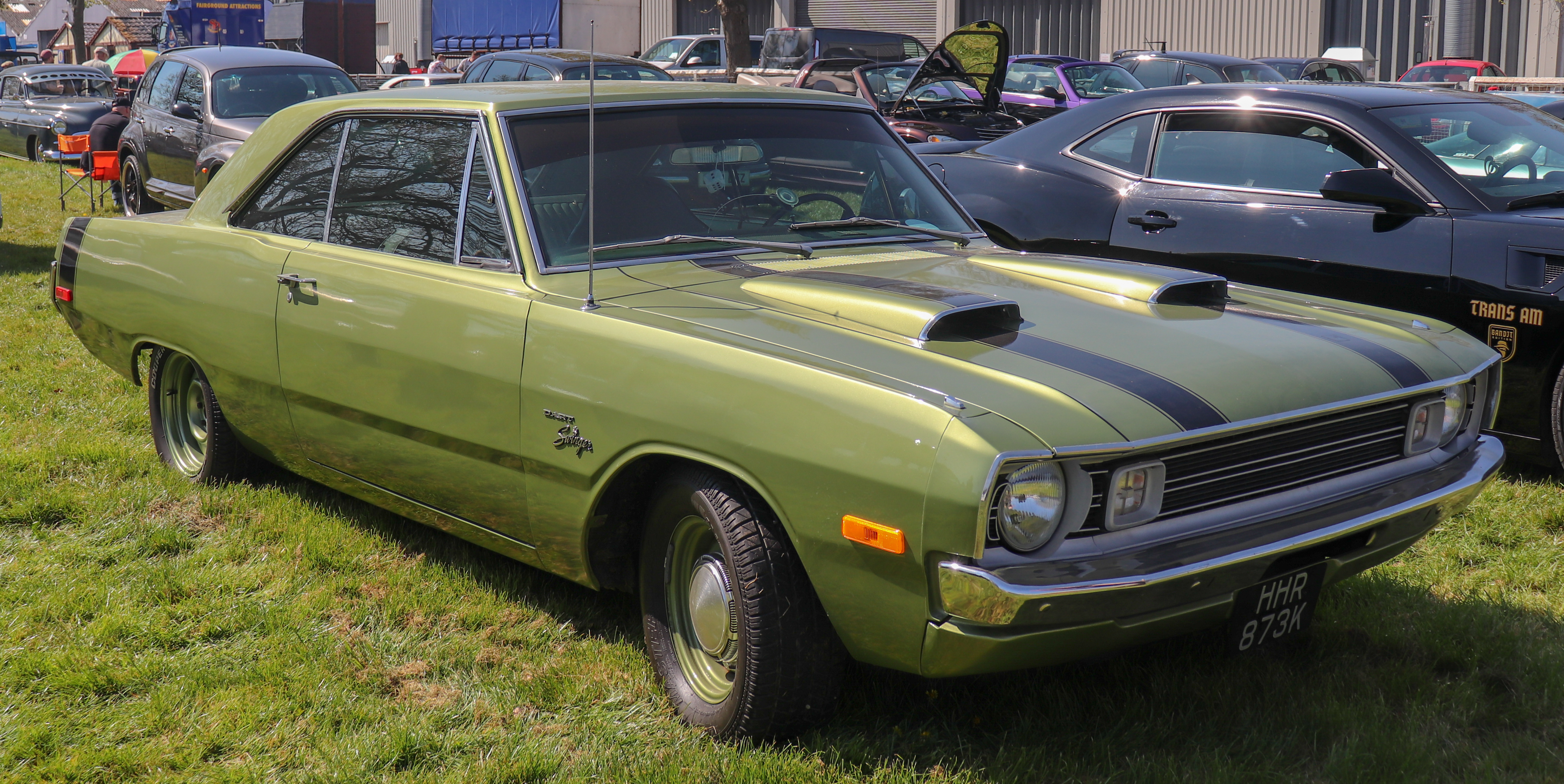

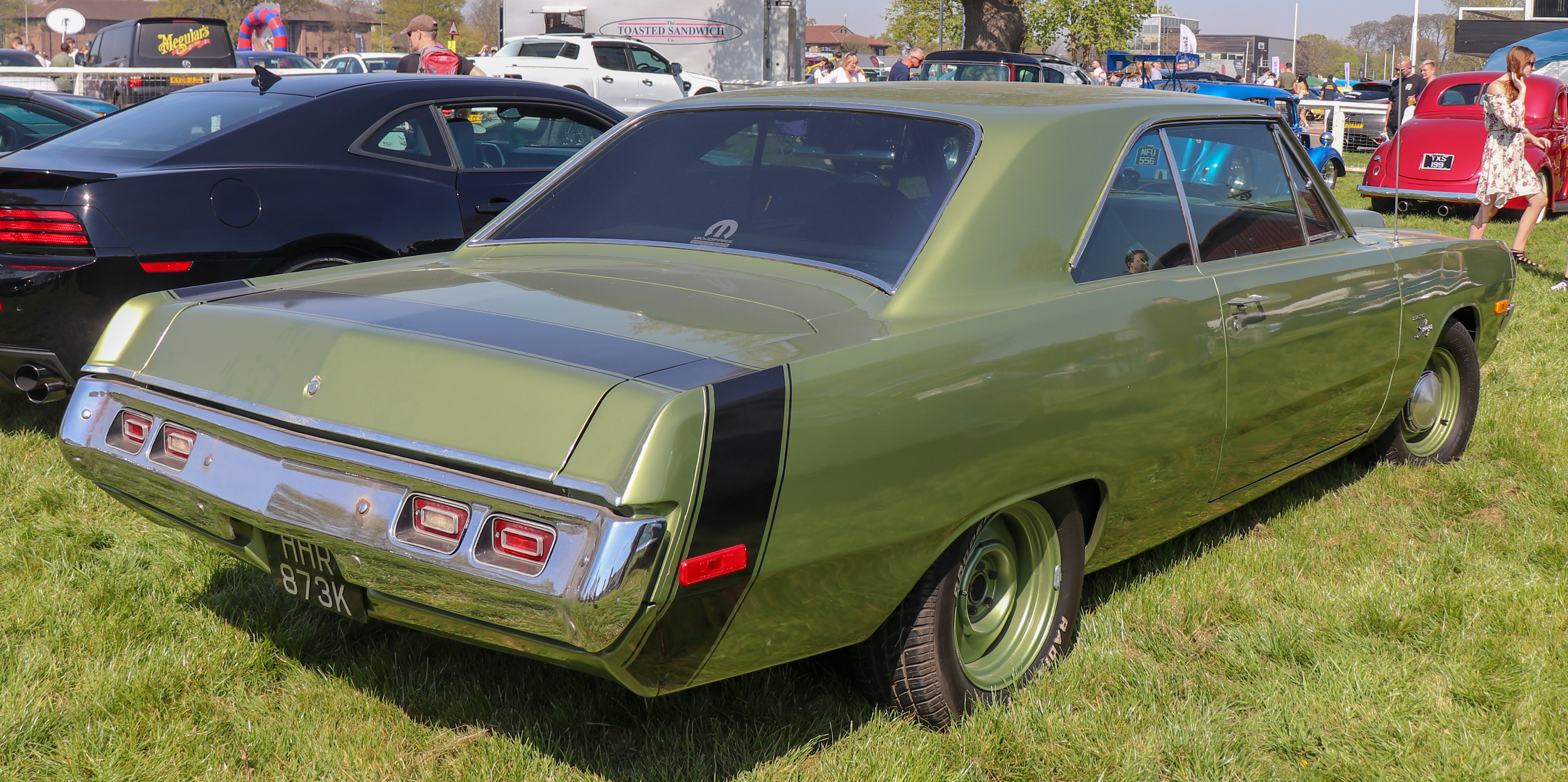
1972 Dart Swinger

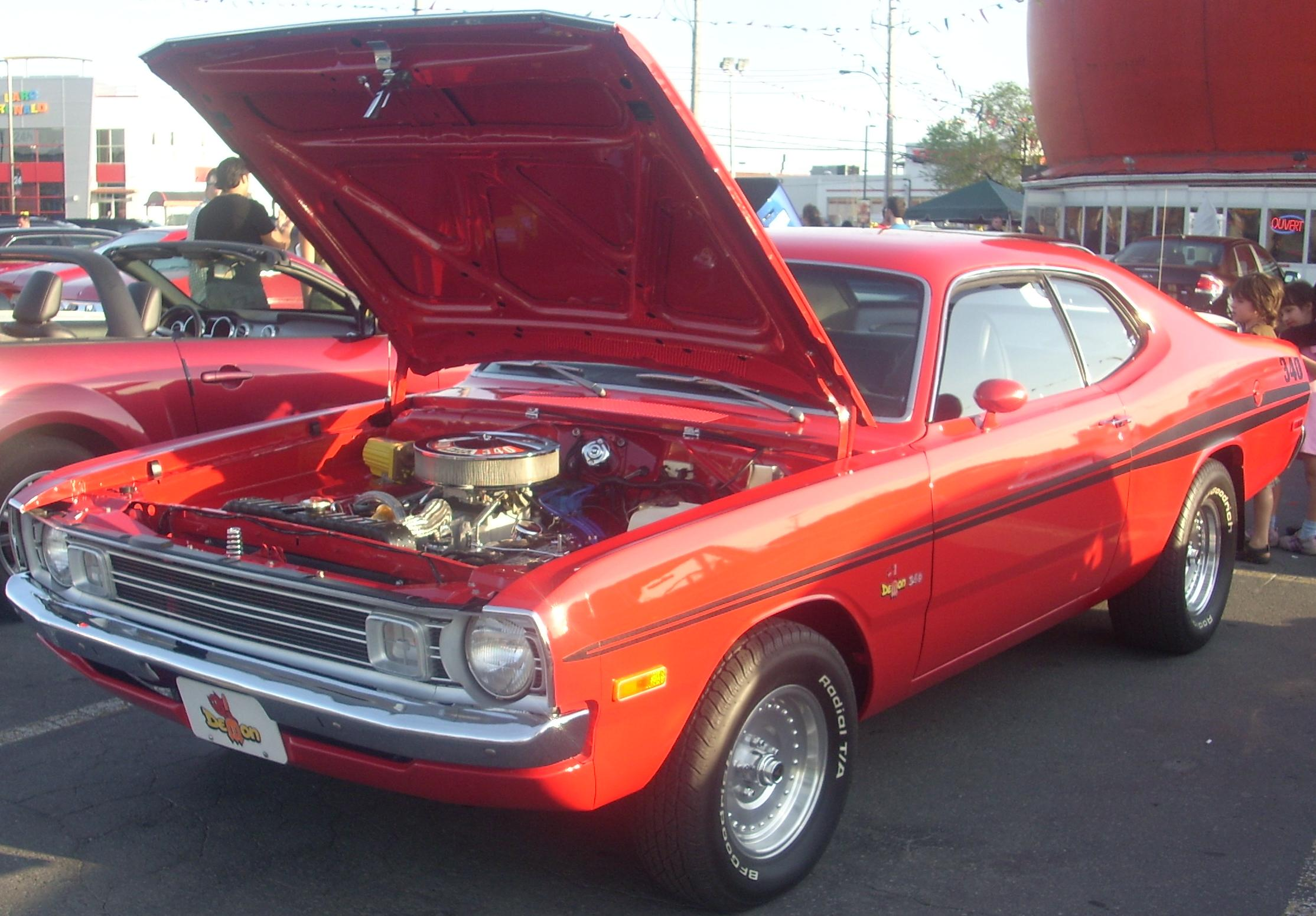
1972 Demon 340

Changes for 1972 included a revised grille without the central divider of the 1970 and 1971 items, new surface-mounted sidemarker lights rather than the previous flush-mount units, the instrument cluster was now shared with the Valiant and featured a large, rectangular speedometer and several, small, round gauges; the AM/FM-radio option returned. The Demon had new fender-mounted metal "Demon" badges without the small devil character on the 1971 decals. The "Demon" decal on the rear of the car was replaced by Dodge and Dart emblems on the lower right edge of the deck lid. Some Demons with the side and rear panel tape stripes retained the tape devil character. A new, optional, single, hood scoop replaced 1971's dual scoops, and was coupled with a hood-paint blackout that had been standard on the 1971 high-trim/high-value Demon Sizzler model. Cars equipped with the optional rally wheels now came with newly restyled center caps, finished in a light-argent (silver) paint. Demon production was substantially less than the Duster's; this is reflected in higher collector car values for the Demon, especially V8 models.

==== 1973 ====
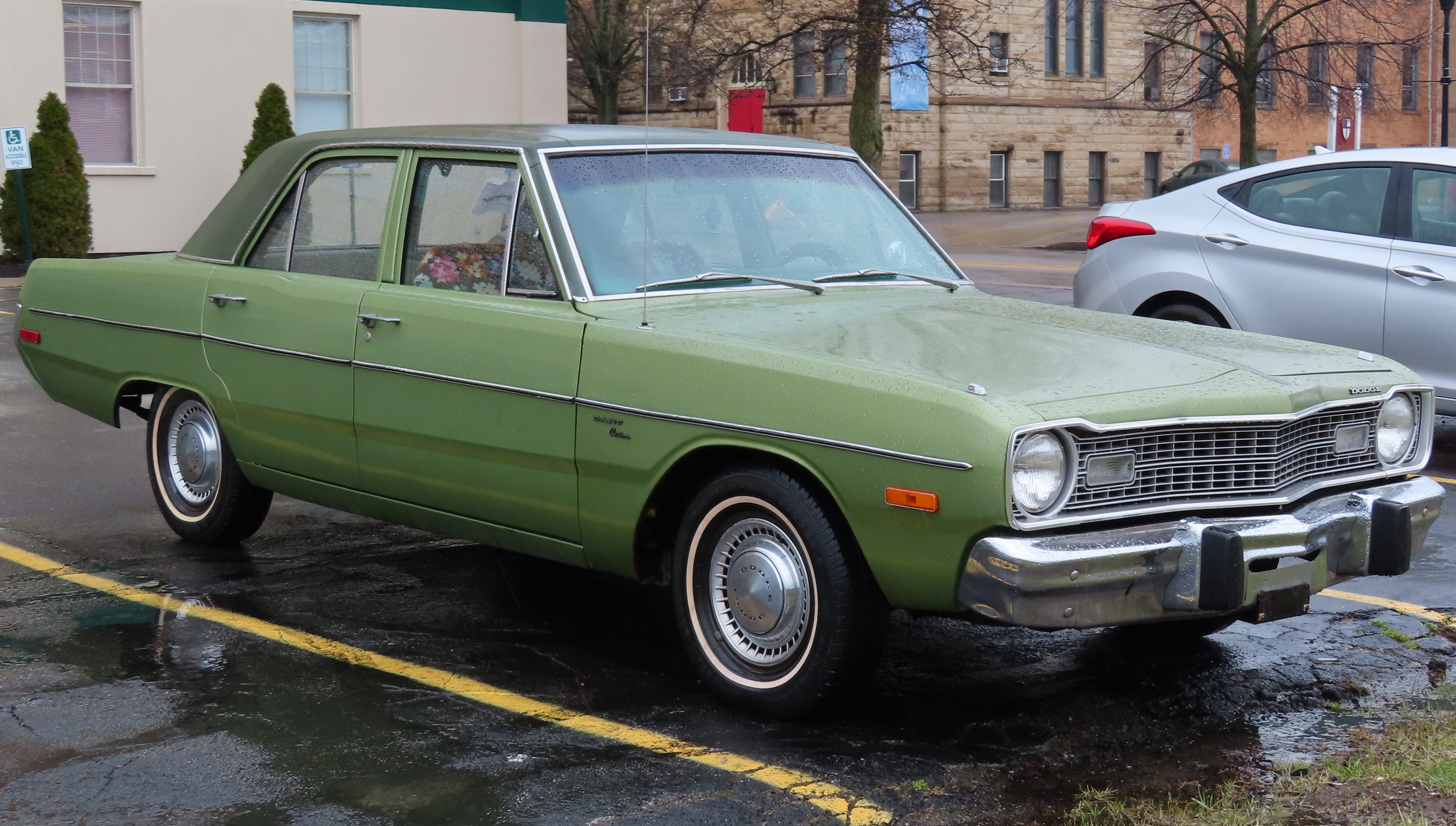
1973 Dart Custom 4-Door

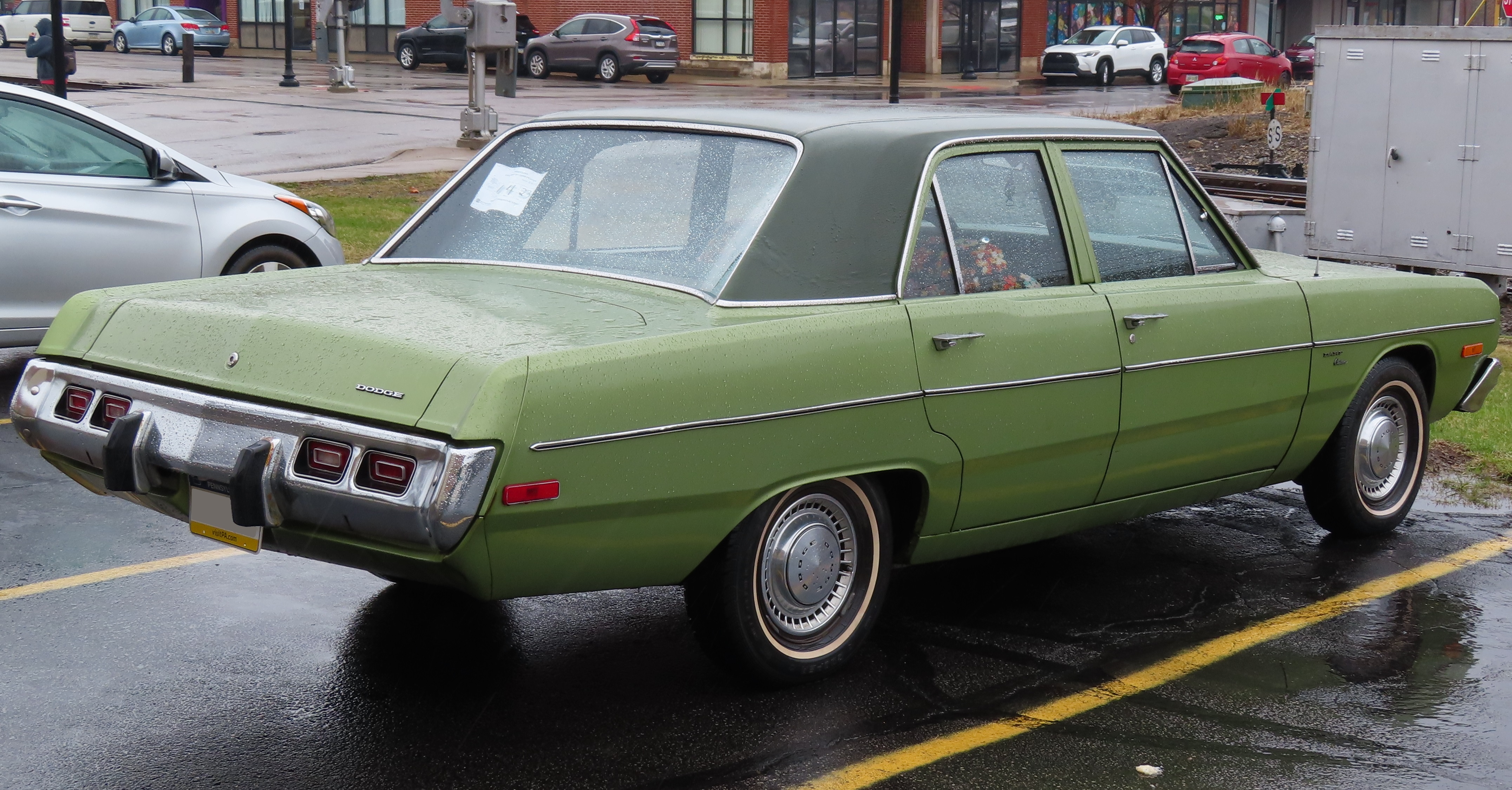
1973 Dart Custom 4-Door

The 1973 model year Darts received new front styling with revised fenders, grille, header panel, and hood. Impact absorbing front bumpers were installed to comply with new federal regulations, as well as side-impact guard beams in the doors and new emission control devices. New single-piston disc brakes replaced the more complex 4-piston units offered from 1965 to 1972.

Chrysler's new electronic ignition system was standard equipment on all engines, and starter motors were revised for faster engine cranking. The K-frame was modified to accommodate a new spool-type engine mount that limited engine roll to 3°. The upper ball joints were upgraded to the larger B-body units. Along with these chassis changes, the wheel bolt pattern on Darts with disc brakes was enlarged from 4 in (101.6 mm) to the 4.5 in (114.3 mm) pattern common to the larger B- and C-body Chrysler-built passenger cars. Darts with 4-wheel drum brakes continued with the smaller bolt pattern. The standard rear axle was still the 7¼-inch unit, but the heavy-duty option was now an 8¼-inch item rather than the previous 8¾-inch rear axle. Standard rear axle ratios were 2.76:1 with automatic transmission and 3.23:1 with manual, though other ratios were available. Vent wings were deleted from the Swinger but not from the 4-door sedans. A new "Quiet Car" package was available, consisting of extra sound insulation, premium exhaust hangers, and an exhaust resonator.

The Demon fastback was renamed "Dart Sport" in response to poor sales. It was thought that the "Demon" name and devil-with-pitchfork logo negatively affected sales to people of faith. The high-performance model thus became Dart Sport 340, and 1973 saw styling changes to go along with the name change. The Dart Sport received the same new front end as the other Darts, and its taillights were changed to two lights per side, each with a chrome trim ring. These would remain unchanged through the 1976 model year.

==== 1974 ====
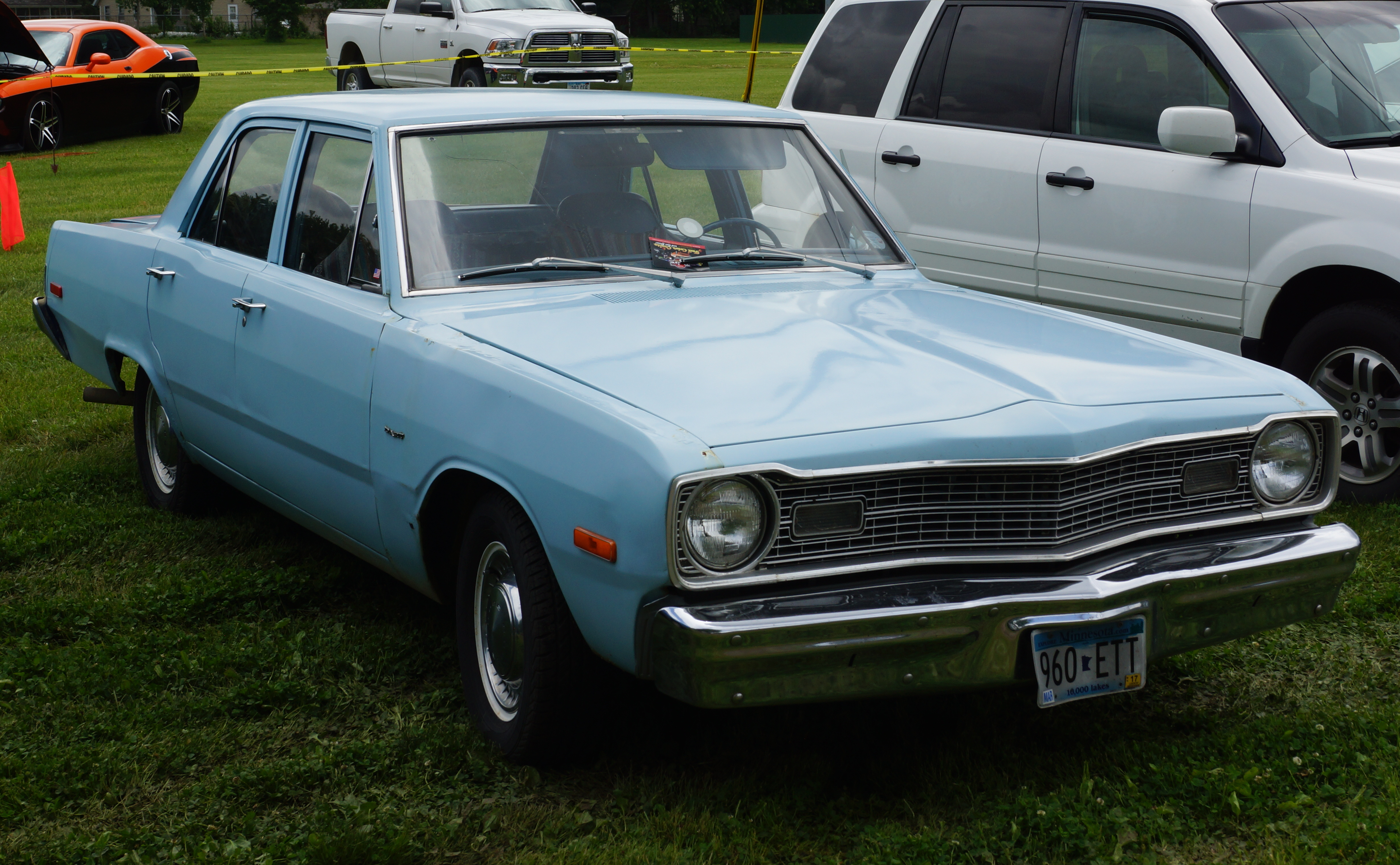
1974 Dart 4-door sedan

In 1974, the US federal 5 mph (8.0 km/h) bumper impact standards were expanded to cover rear bumpers as well as front ones, and as a result, the Swinger and Dart sedan's rear bumpers grew much more massive. Taillights larger than the previous year's items were set above the rear bumper, rather than within it. Shoulder and lap belts were finally combined in all Chrysler products into a retractable, inertia-sensitive, single-buckle design Chrysler called "Unibelt", replacing the difficult-to-use separate lap and shoulder belts that had been installed through 1973.

The Arab oil embargo of 1973, increased sales of smaller cars in the U.S. Dodge introduced the Dart SE (special edition) in mid-1974 as a four-door sedan and two-door hardtop. The SE included velour high back bucket seats with folding armrest, carpeted door panels, woodgrain instrument panel, and deluxe wheel covers along with a TorqueFlite automatic transmission as standard equipment. The SE came equipped with the "quiet car" package introduced in 1973. The air conditioning system available on all Darts had increased capacity, quicker cooldown and lower minimum temperatures. An evaporator pressure regulator valve, long used on larger Chrysler products, varied the compressor's capacity without cycling the clutch.

The Dart Sport 340 was replaced by the Dart Sport 360 245 Bhp. as the 360 cu in (5.9 L) V8 engine replaced the 340 cu in (5.6 L) engine discontinued after 1973.

Production figures 1974

Make and Series	L-6	V-8	Total
Dart	19,912	2,293	22,205
Swinger Special	14,211	1,944	16,155
Swinger	56,126	33,126	89,242
Sport 360	0	3,951	3,951
Sport	40,293	3,225	63,518
Custom	50,047	8,169	78,216
Special Edition	3,111	9,274	12,385
Sum	183,700	101,972	285,672

==== 1975 ====
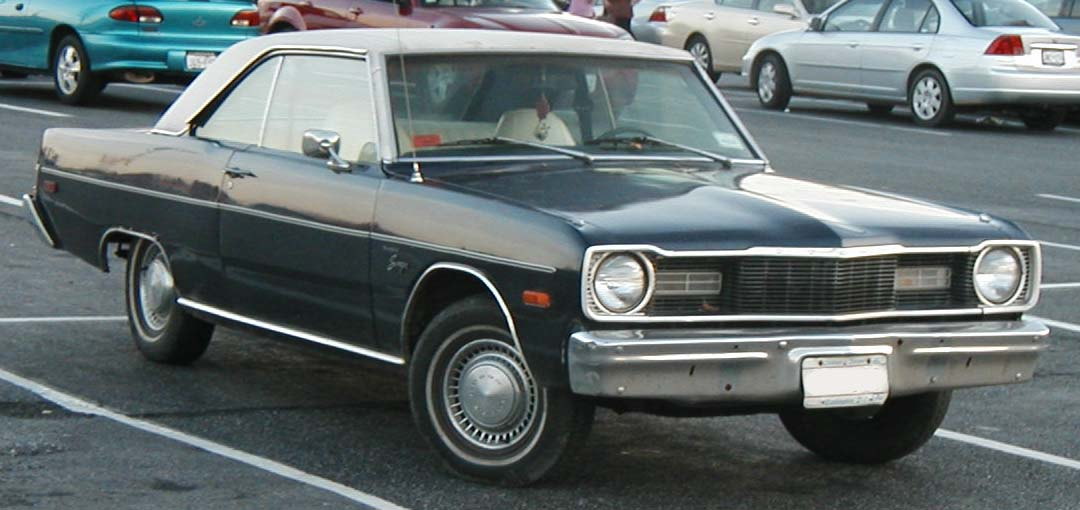
1975 Dart Swinger

The 1975 models were virtually identical to the 1974s, except for a new grille and that California and some high-altitude models were equipped with catalytic converters and so required unleaded gasoline. All 1975 models were required to pass a roof crush test and to meet this stringent requirement, additional reinforcements were added to all Dart 2-door hardtops. Heavy gauge steel in the windshield pillar area had been incorporated into the windshield, pillar, and roof design. Darts were also equipped with an improved energy-absorbing steering column which used multiple slots in the column jacket to replace prior used convoluted mesh design. At impact, force applied to the steering wheel curled the column jacket back over a mandrel mounted on the floor. Federal Motor Safety Standards briefly required that the front seat belts include a starter interlock system that prevented the engine from starting unless the front seat outboard occupant and the driver fastened their belts.

The 198 slant-six engine was discontinued and the 225 became standard equipment on all models. As in 1974, the 360 V8 was limited to the Dart Sport 360 model. A 4-speed manual transmission was offered with the 6-cylinder engine for the first time in the North American market since 1965 and with a new 30% overdrive 4th gear ratio. It was Chrysler's first application of overdrive since 1959. The final drive ratio in fourth gear was 2.36:1 on the slant-six cars equipped with 3.23:1 rear axle, and 2.15:1 on the V8s equipped with 2.94:1 rear axle. The result was less engine noise and wear and greater fuel economy.

Also for 1975, heaters had 14% more heating capacity than in the previous year's models. The added capacity was the result of adding a third speed to the blower system, which provided 20% greater airflow at maximum setting. The electrically heated backglass defogger grid timer cycle was doubled to 10 minutes. Additionally, sound insulation was improved.

==== 1976 ====
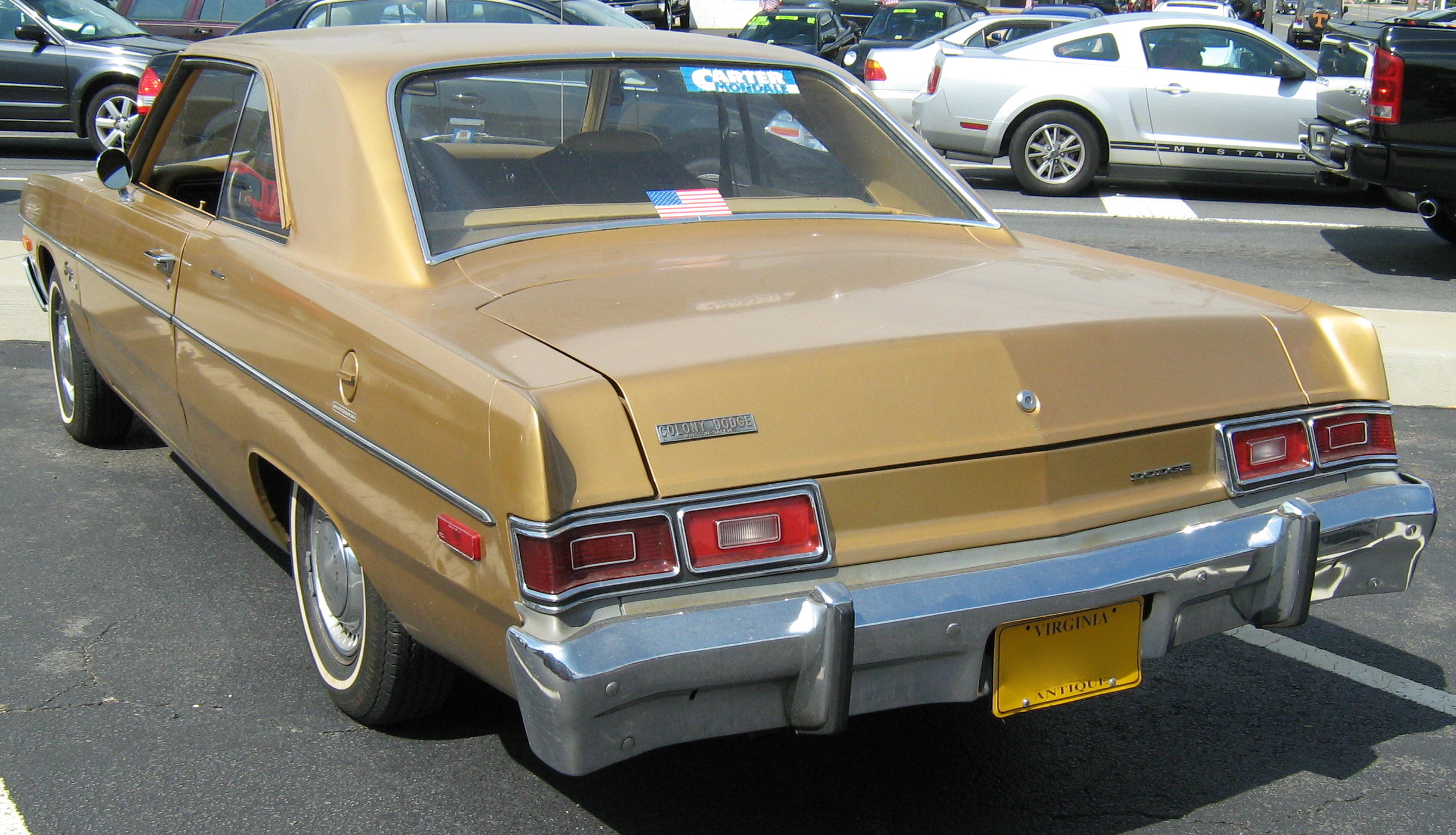
1976 Dart Swinger Special

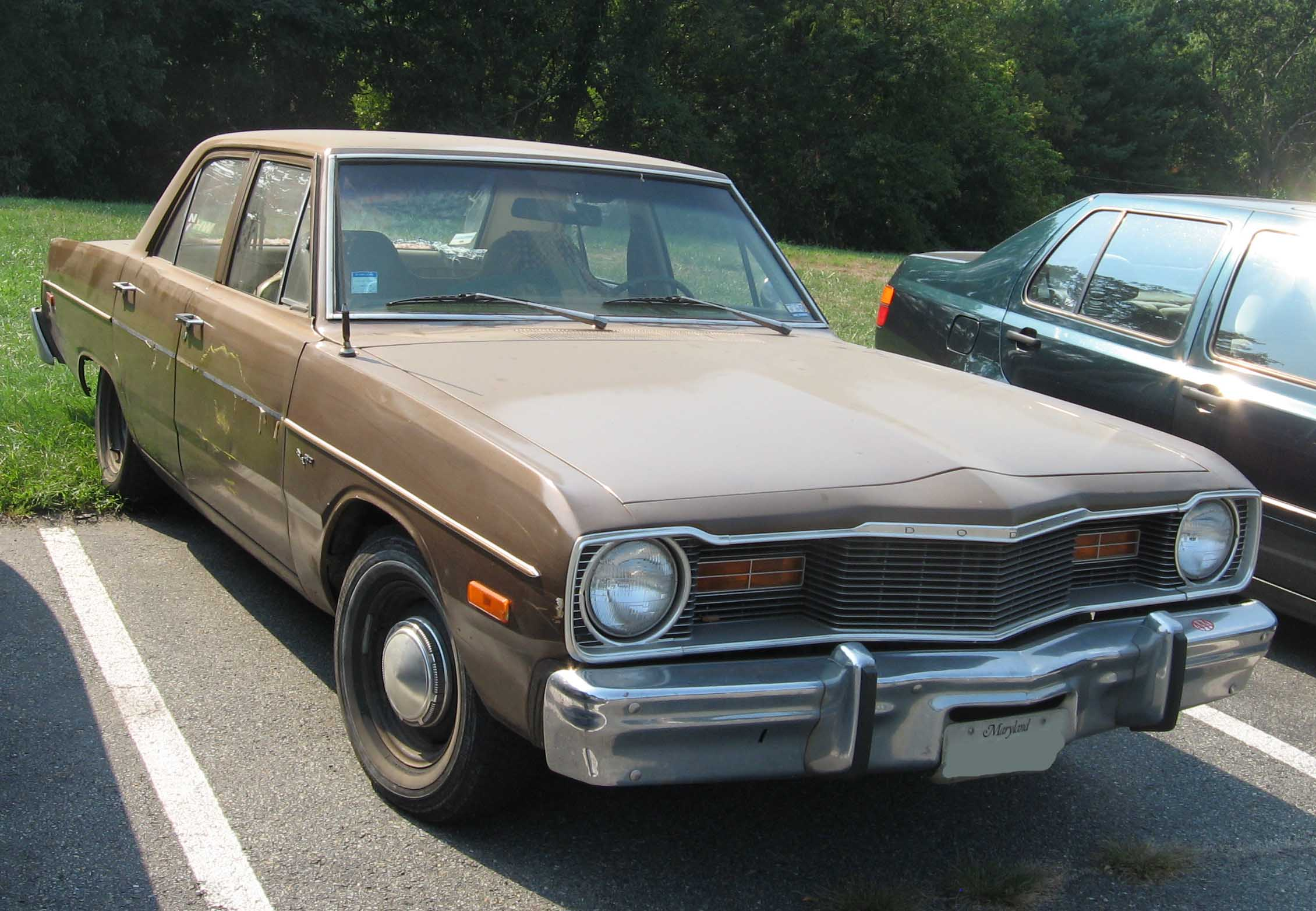
1976 Dart 4-door sedan

1976 was the Dart's final year in the North-American market. The rear-view mirror was mounted on the windshield rather than from the roof. Front disc brakes became standard equipment on 1 January 1976 in accord with more stringent U.S. federal brake-performance requirements, a new 2-spoke steering wheel debuted and a new foot-operated parking brake replaced the under-dash T-handle used since the Dart's 1963 introduction as a compact car. The grille's parking lamps were cast in amber, whereas the previous years had clear lenses with amber-colored bulbs.

The Dart Sport 360 was dropped as a separate model in 1976, but the 360 cu in (5.9 L) four-barrel, dual exhaust (without catalytic converters) V8 was a $376 option (except in California) for the $3,370 Dart Sport V8 models with automatic transmission. Car & Driver magazine tested the Dart Sport 360 in the April 1976 issue, pitting it against the Chevrolet Corvette and Pontiac Trans Am, and found its top speed of 121.6 mph (195.7 km/h) to be second to the Corvette's 124.5 mph (200.4 km/h).

Dart Custom 4-Door Sedan was dropped as the mid-level 4-door sedan model, but the features and trim were carried over as option package A68. Sedans equipped with the Custom package received the same "Custom" front fender badges as were applied to the standalone 1975 models of the same name. Elimination of the Custom series narrowed Dart's 4-Door Sedan offerings in Dart's final year to two models, Dart and Dart Special Edition.

===== A38 Police Package =====
In 1976, the Dart was offered with a police package, with production code A38. The A38 Dart had high-specification components and systems throughout, including a heavy-duty suspension with a rear sway bar, stronger leaf springs and firmer shock absorbers, larger brakes with semi-metallic front disc pads, maximum engine cooling as well as a high-capacity alternator and battery. The engines were Chrysler's 225 slant-six, 318 V8, and 360 cu in (5.9 L) LA V8 (220 H.P., with non-catalyst in 49-state models and a true dual exhaust; California models had a single exhaust with the catalytic converter) with an A727 TorqueFlite transmission. Police-specific equipment such as a calibrated speedometer ("certified" 120 mph), high-intensity dome light and wiring harness for a rooftop light bar were standard equipment with an A-pillar spotlight and push bars were optional. Production volume was low, with most A38 Darts going to the Los Angeles and Ventura police departments in Southern California. For the most part, police agencies preferred the larger intermediate Dodge Coronet or full-size Dodge Monaco.

A37 Taxi Package A Taxi Package was also offered in Dart's final year of production. Standard equipment included roof-light wiring, structural reinforcements in the body frame members, heavy-duty shocks and alternator and maximum capacity radiator. Engine options were the 225 slant-six or 318 V8. The Taxi package also included numerous interior upgrades including high-grade black vinyl, heavy duty floor mats, and heavy duty springs in front and rear seat cushions and seat backs. At extra cost, fleet buyers could specify a broader range of colors than those offered to retail buyers from the Production and Fleet Paint Selector, including Taxi Yellow, color code Y7.

==== Dart Sport packages ====
===== Convertriple and Hang 10 =====
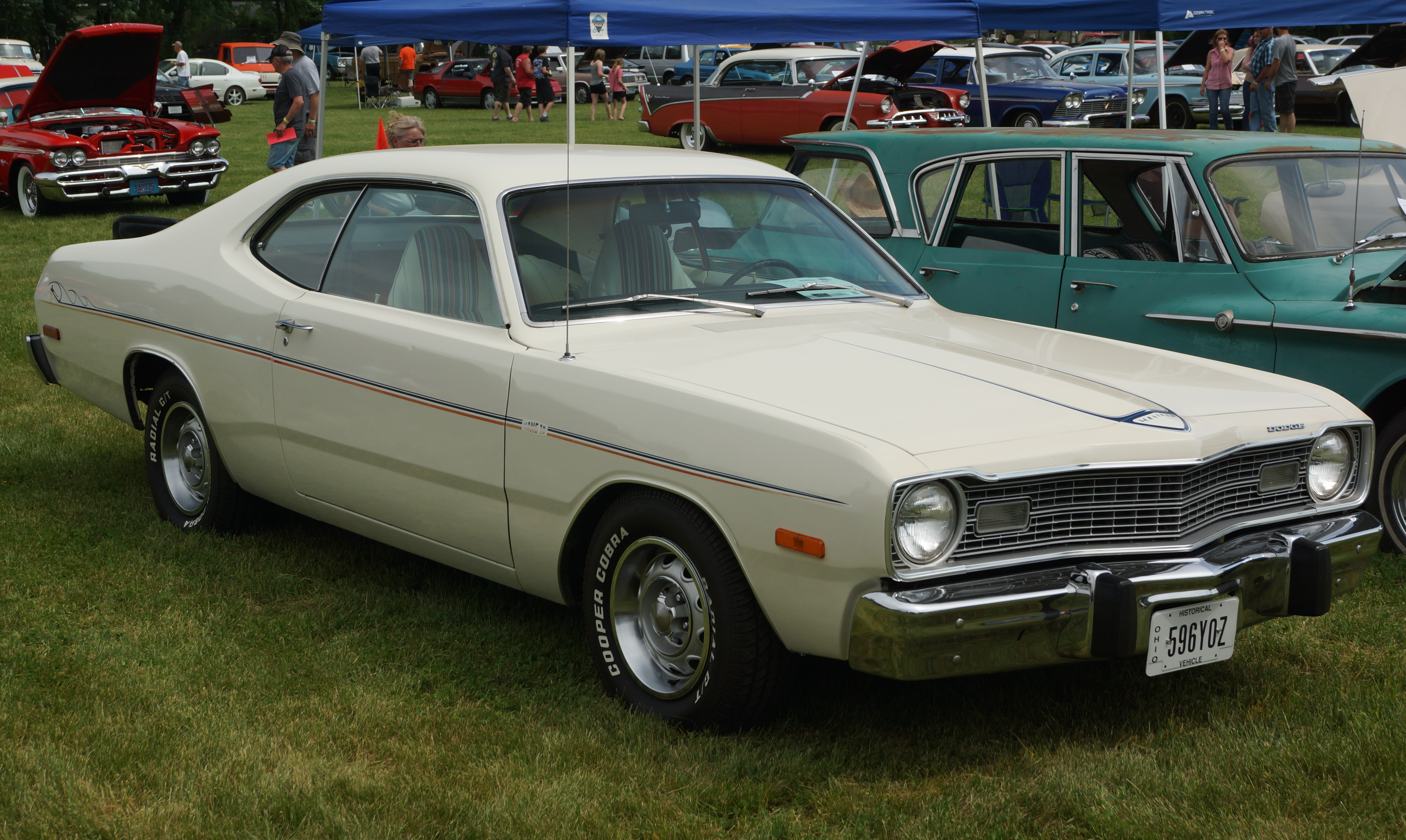
1974 Dart Sport "Hang 10"

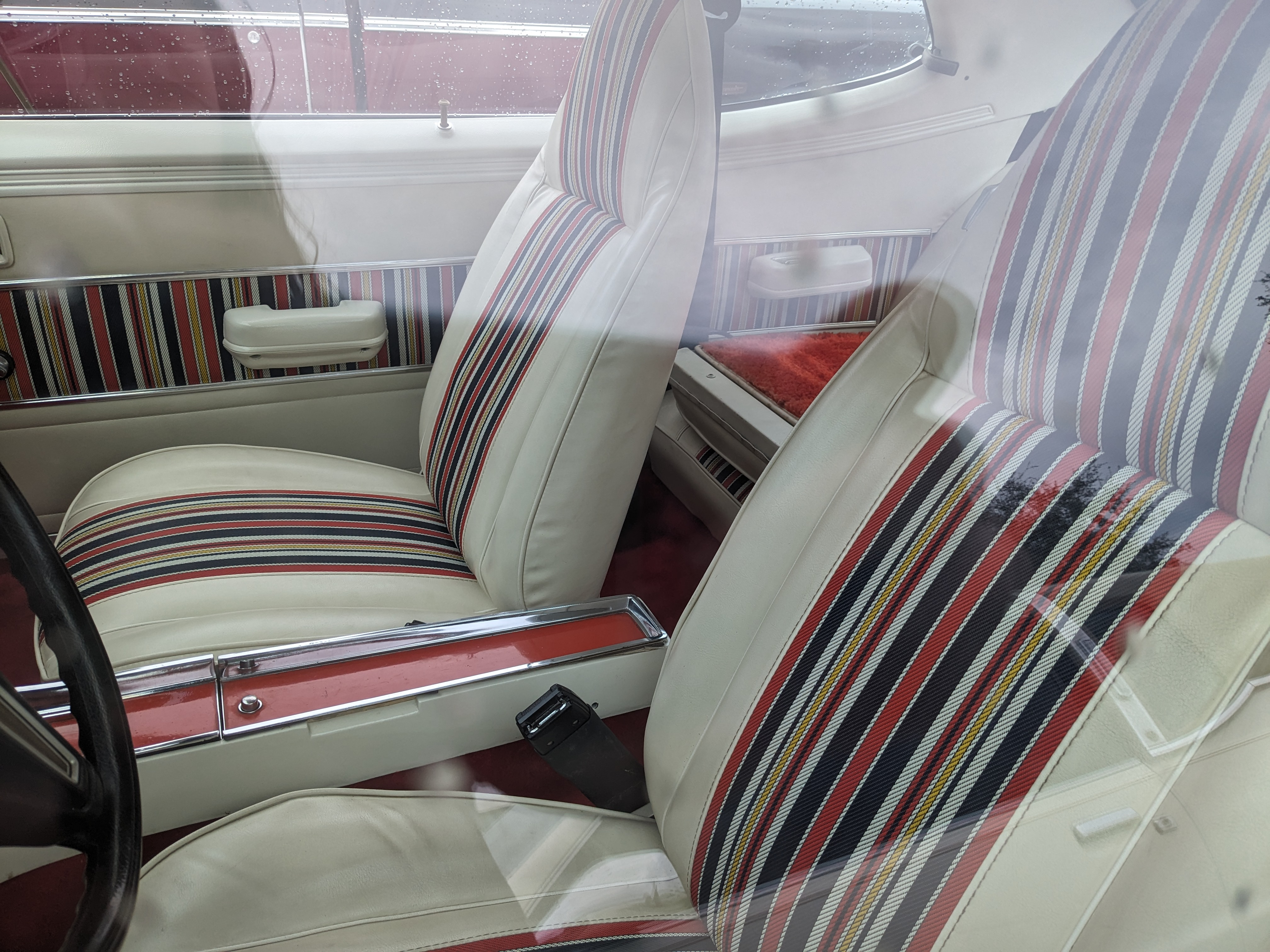
1974 Dart Sport "Hang 10" interior

For 1973 and 1974, the Convertriple option on the Dart Sport included a fold-down rear seat/security panel offering 6 ft 5 in (1.96 m) of lengthwise space, and a manually operated metal sunroof. It was advertised as "three cars in one": an economy compact, a convertible alternative because of the sunroof, and a roomy station wagon alternative because of the fold down rear seat.

The Convertriple was the basis for the 1975 Hang 10 option. It was aimed at surfers in an attempt by Dodge marketers to better determine consumer preferences in a declining performance market. Hang ten is a surfing expression for balancing at the end of a surfboard with ten toes over the nose of the board while riding the wave. Available only in eggshell white exterior with a factory-installed sunroof, the car's fold-down rear seat permitted the loading of a surfboard through the trunk. The Hang 10 option continued the surfing theme with various colored stripe material accenting the white vinyl seats and door panels. Orange shag carpet covered the back of the fold-down rear seat while the dash and center console had orange accents. Red and blue exterior stripes started at the quarter panels with a wave-riding surfer graphic. A surfboard design ran down the center of the hood. Between the taillights, the stripe pattern fattened into surfboard-shaped letters that spelled out "Hang 10."

===== Caravan Tan =====
In mid-1974, Dodge introduced the Caravan Tan trim package. Features for this Dart Sport included a desert-hued vinyl bench seat with multi-colored striped inserts and white piping, and gold-colored instrument panel, dashboard, and carpeting. Exterior color choices were dark moonstone, Sienna, gold metallic, dark gold metallic, golden fawn, and white.

===== Spirit of '76 =====
In a tie-in with the United States Bicentennial, a Spirit of '76 edition of the Dart Sport featured white paint with prominent red and blue bodyside striping meant to evoke the image of the American flag.

===== Dart Lite =====
In response to increased interest in fuel economy, Dodge offered the Dart Lite fuel economy package which weighed at least 150 lb (68 kg) less than the ordinary Dart Sport. The 225 slant-six was the only available engine, equipped with an aluminum intake manifold for the first time since 1960 and a specially calibrated carburetor and distributor. Bumper reinforcement brackets were aluminum instead of steel, while the hood and trunk lid bracing and inner panels were also aluminum. The slant-six engine block had already been modified for reduced weight in 1975; in the middle of 1976 production, its crankshaft was changed from forged steel to lighter cast iron. The high-flow exhaust system included a dual-biscuit catalytic converter, a larger 2¼" headpipe, and the muffler used on V8 models. The Dart Lite was equipped with a 2.94:1 rear axle rather than the customary 3.21:1 ratio when the car was ordered with a three- or four-speed manual transmission. The A833OD Overdrive 4-speed manual transmission housing was made of aluminum and had a .73:1 final drive ratio which allowed cruising at highway speeds with minimum engine revolutions. Like all other Darts, the Dart Lites with automatic transmission came with a 2.76:1 rear axle as standard equipment. The Dart Lite with manual transmission was rated by the EPA at 36 mpg (6.5 L/100km) in highway driving. The Plymouth version was the Feather Duster.

== Taxi ==
Darts were offered to the taxicab industry for their whole production run from 1963 to 1976. While specifications varied by year, interior upgrades generally included heavy-duty front and rear black rubber floor mats, heavy-duty seat cushion springs with full-foam back and air-foam seats, black all-vinyl trim with heavy canvas-backed vinyl seat covers, interior door pull assist straps or handles, and a door-ajar warning light for the driver. Mechanically, Dart taxicabs were generally equipped with heavy-duty brakes, tires, shock absorbers, front torsion bars and rear leaf springs, a high-output alternator, an increased-capacity cooling system, and extra-lean carburetor calibration for greater economy. In 1976, the Chrome Yellow taxi package was available only with a 225 slant-six engine producing 95 hp (71 kW) and 170 lb⋅ft (230 N⋅m); transmission was the (rare) A-727-RG (raised-deck motor, which was the slant-six series) with California emissions, 90 hp (67 kW) and 165 lb⋅ft (224 N⋅m). Options included a radio suppression package and a Fuel Pacer System. Many—if not all—of them had a body-color paint sales code of "999", meaning special order paint.

== Racing and competition ==
=== D-Dart ===
Dodge offered a performance version of the Dart GT in 1966. Known as the D-Dart for competitive use in NHRA's D/stock class, the 273 V8 was modified to produce 275 bhp (205 kW). Most of the power came from a larger carburetor and a more radical camshaft. The bulletin sent to the dealers from Chrysler also mentions an 8.75 in (222 mm) rear axle with 4.89:1 final drive ratio.

=== SCCA competition ===
In 1966, the SCCA introduced the new Trans-American Sedan Championship that allowed competition among Dodge Darts, Plymouth Barracudas, Chevrolet Corvairs, Ford Mustangs, and other "production touring cars" with a maximum wheelbase of 116 in (2,946.4 mm). The cars competed in two classes, over 2 liters and under 2 liters. Few modifications were allowed; bumpers, rear seats, and floor mats could be removed, mufflers could be replaced with straight pipes, and different wheels could be used so long as the stock rim diameter and width were maintained. Any engine component available over the dealer parts counter was sanctioned for use. Bob Tullius' race team, called "Group 44," used Dart 270 model coupes and GT coupes with 273-4bbl engines and were sponsored by Quaker State. The team won the 24-hour endurance race at Marlboro Motor Raceway in car No.4 driven by Tullius and Tony Adamowicz, who would also go on to win at Riverside International Raceway. Dodge pulled sponsorship of the Darts after one season.

=== Super stock ===
Although racers like Dick Landy and Don Garlits had modified Darts in the mid-1960s to run in the National Hot Rod Association - NHRA funny car class using the 426 Hemi, super stock class racing of the Dart was almost non-existent due to the small V-8s available. In 1968, Dodge contracted Hurst Performance to build a limited number of Darts powered by the 440 cu in (7.2 L) RB big-block and 426 cu in (7.0 L) Hemi-powered Darts to compete in the SS/B class as the LO23 "Hurst Hemi Dart". According to Chrysler staff engineer Larry Shepard, the majority of these Darts were Hemi powered, although a small pilot run of fifty 440-powered Darts were also built in 1968. "In 1969," said Shepard, "we built over 600 440-powered Darts-basically the same as the 383 GTS, except for the engine."

== Foreign markets ==
Right-hand drive 1960, 1961, and 1962 Darts were exported to Commonwealth countries such as Australia, New Zealand, South Africa, and Singapore. In Australia they were badged as the Dodge Phoenix. In South Africa, a DeSoto-branded version of the car called the Diplomat was sold from 1960 to 1962, as well. Once the "Dart" name was moved to Dodge's compact car for 1963, the Phoenix was no longer Dart-related; each year thereafter through 1971, the "Phoenix" name was applied to the RHD version of a Dodge or Plymouth B-body or C-body for Commonwealth export.

Chrysler Australia used the 1967 Dart front end in the Australian-built VE Valiant. The two-door coupe versions of the subsequent VF and VG models used the Dart two-door's body from the A-pillar back married to an Australian front end. Australian sedan and pickup truck models were also exported in knock-down kit form to New Zealand for local assembly there from 1963 to 1978.

Dodge Darts were assembled in right-hand drive in South Africa during the 1960s and up until 1972 and sold locally as the Chrysler Valiant. All South African models were built with a locally sourced 225 cu in six-cylinder engine. U.S. Plymouth/Dodge models were fully replaced by Australian Chrysler products from 1972.

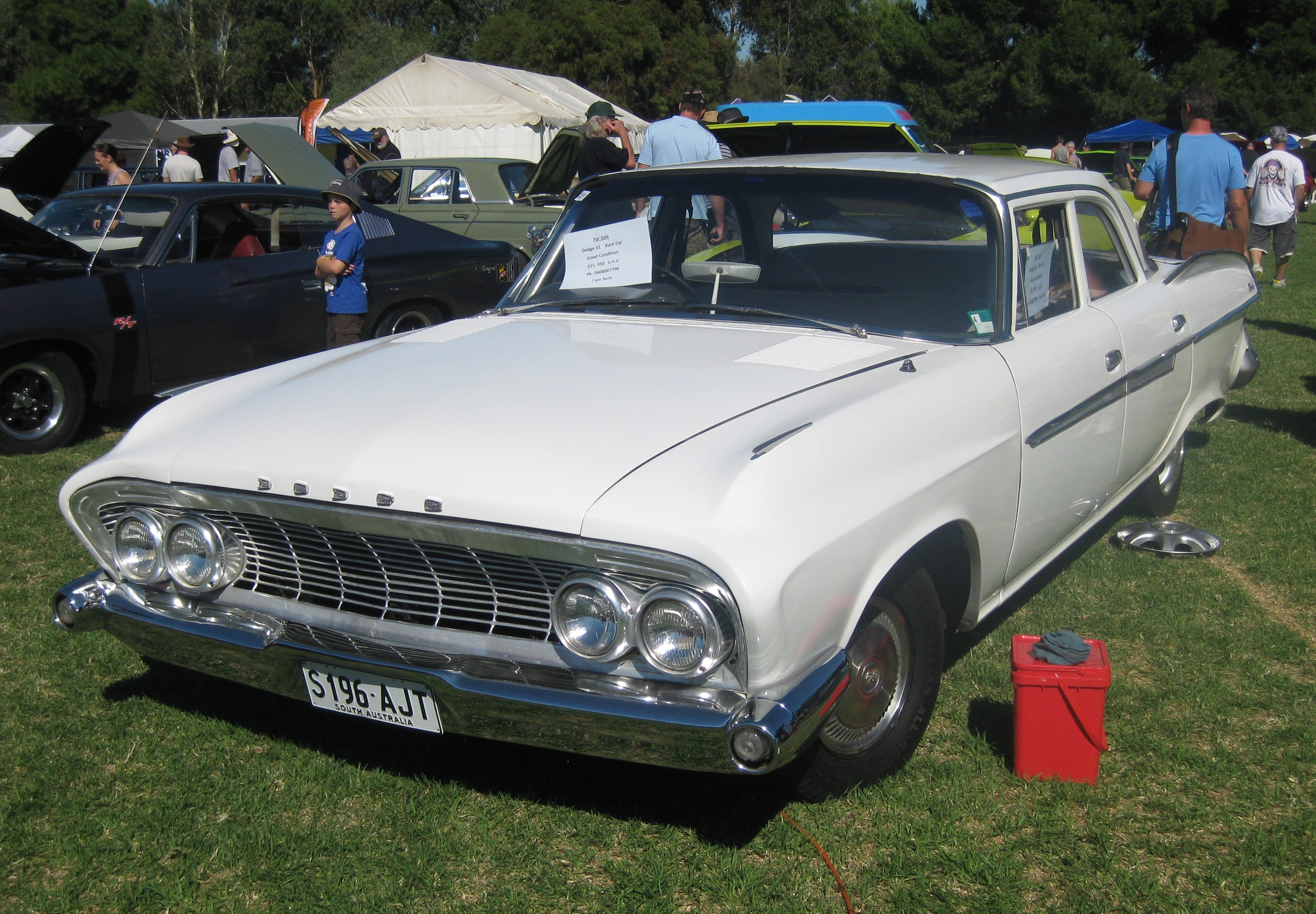
The Dodge RD4 Phoenix, an Australian-assembled variant of the 1961 Dart Phoenix

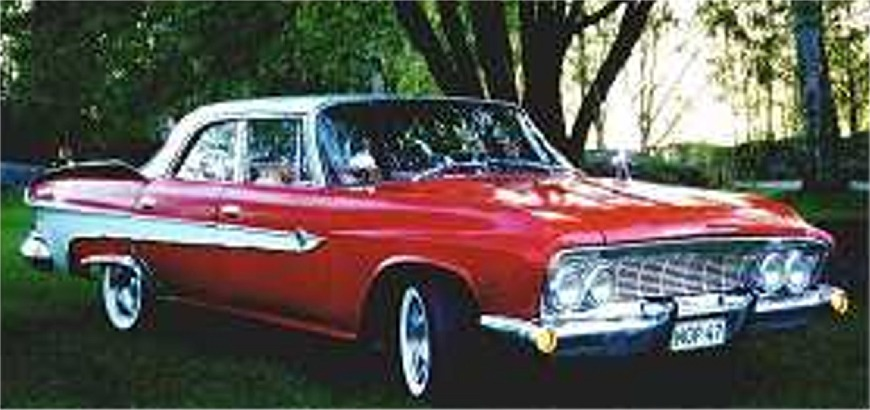
South African 1961 DeSoto Diplomat

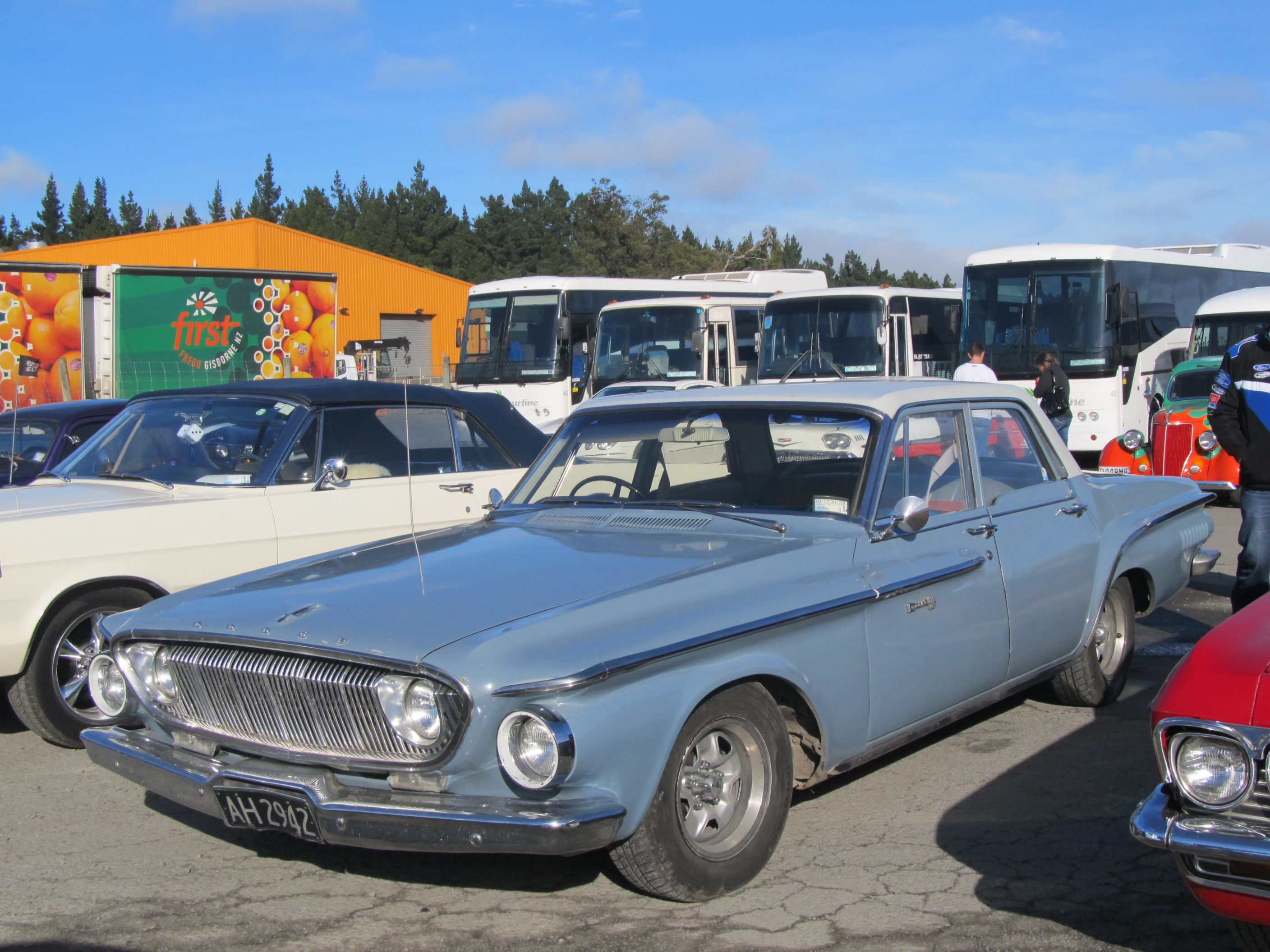
New Zealand-assembled 1962 Dart 330. In Australia, this model was sold as the "Dodge Phoenix."

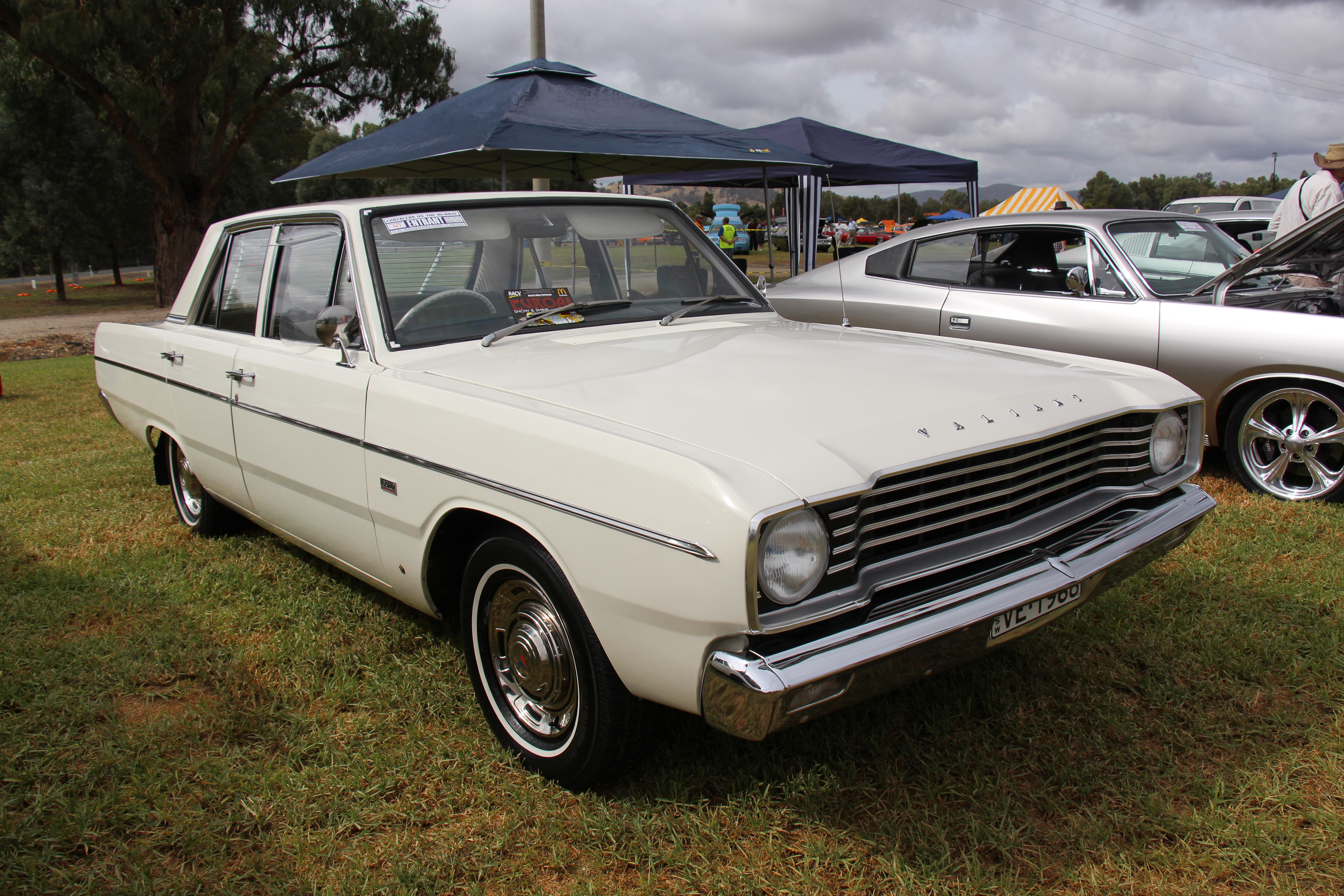
The 1968 Australian-built VE Valiant sedan featured a 1967 Dart front end.

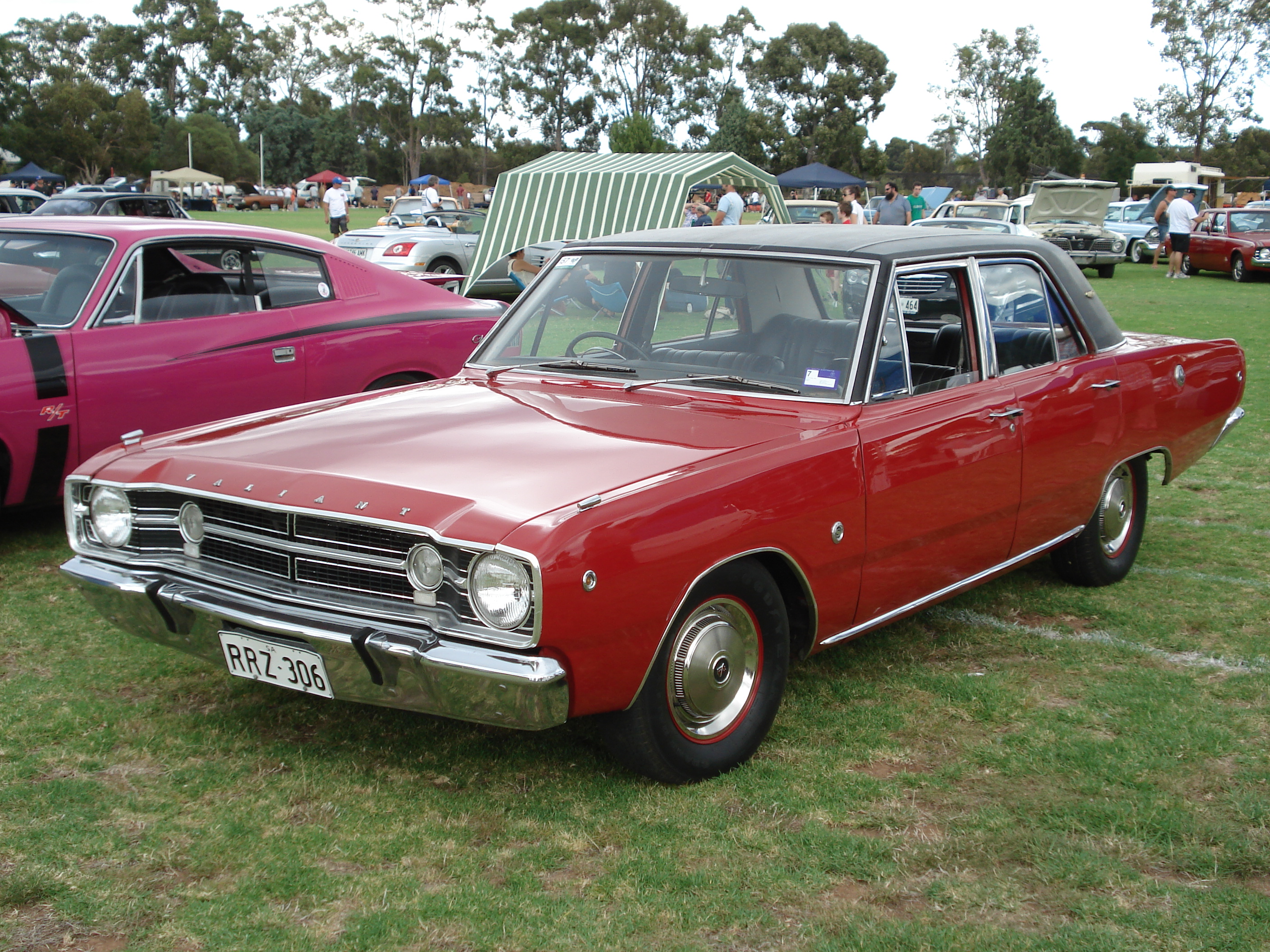
South African Chrysler Valiant VIP, a RHD Dart. This is a 1968 model.

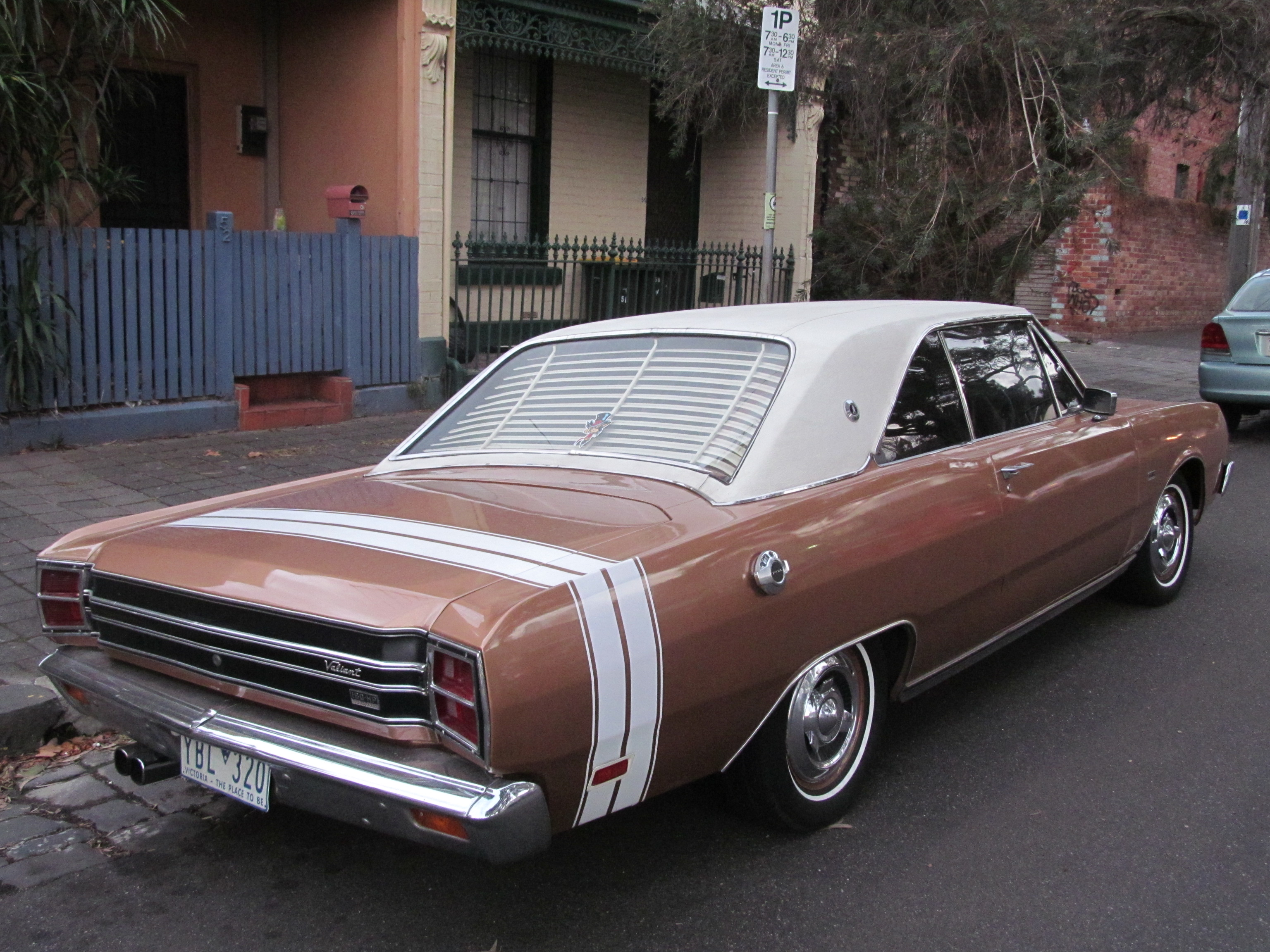
Dart-based Australian 1970 Chrysler VG Valiant hardtop

=== South America ===
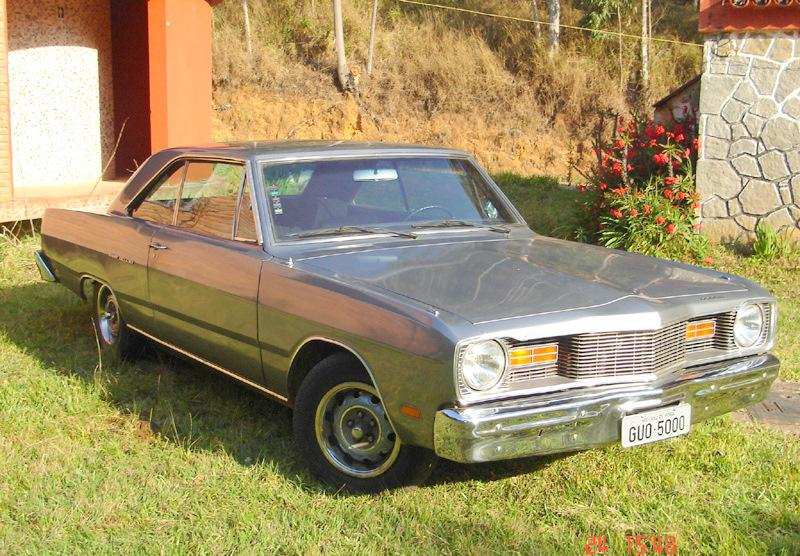
1980 Dart (Brazil)

The Dodge Dart started being produced in Brazil from knock-down kits in October 1969, replacing the Simca-derived Chrysler Esplanada.

Production of A-body Darts continued in Brazil, where they were also sold as Charger, Magnum and Le Baron, through 1981 and in Colombia through 1977. Dart-based A-body cars with various names including Valiant, Coronado and Polara were produced in Argentina through 1979. The Brazilian A-body cars used the 111-inch wheelbase (2,820 mm) bodystyle from 1970 and were always equipped with the 318 cubic inch V8, set up to run on the lower-octane fuel used in Latin America at the time. Originally a three-speed manual transmission was standard, with an optional Torqueflite automatic transmission, and later a four-speed manual was also available. The equipment levels in Brazil were: Sedan de Luxo, Coupe de Luxo, SE, Gran Sedan, Gran Coupe, Charget LS, Le Baron and Magnum with the sporty Charger R/T .

The last true A-body Dart was built in the summer of 1981 in Brazil. This car is virtually identical to the U.S. market's 1976 Swinger.

=== Spain ===
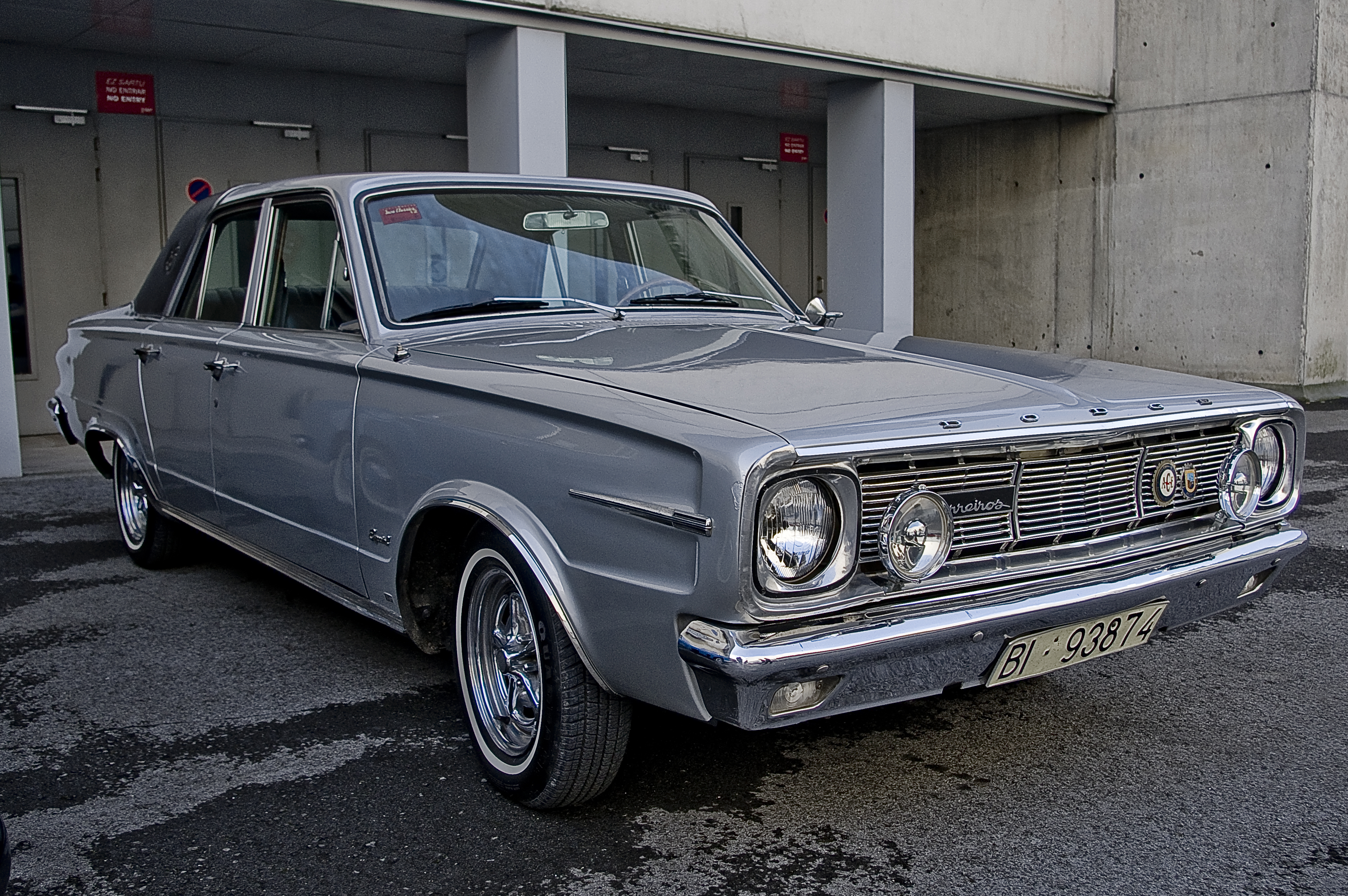
Barreiros diesel-engined 1966 Dart

From 1965 to 1970 a Spanish version of the Dodge Dart based on the original from the United States was manufactured in the Barreiros Villaverde factory in Madrid. In 1969, the Barreiros-made Dart was facelifted with a different front fascia; using the same headlights from Dodge C-38 trucks.

In March 1971 a new version, using the same 111 in (2,819 mm) wheelbase but with different sheet metal, the Dodge 3700 was produced until 1977 when the Spanish automotive taxation system was changed. The 3700 actually received the sheet metal from the Argentinian Dodge Polara, with certain modifications for the Spanish market. The rear wheel openings were larger and round, the grille and all lights were different, as was the instrumentation. The 3700 also came as standard with front disc brakes and power steering. A total of 17,589 units were manufactured of the earlier range (1965 to 1970) in Spain, they were produced as a SKD due to the protectionist Spanish regulations of those years. 9,959 Dodge 3700s were built until 1977, although the last new 3700 was only first registered in 1980.

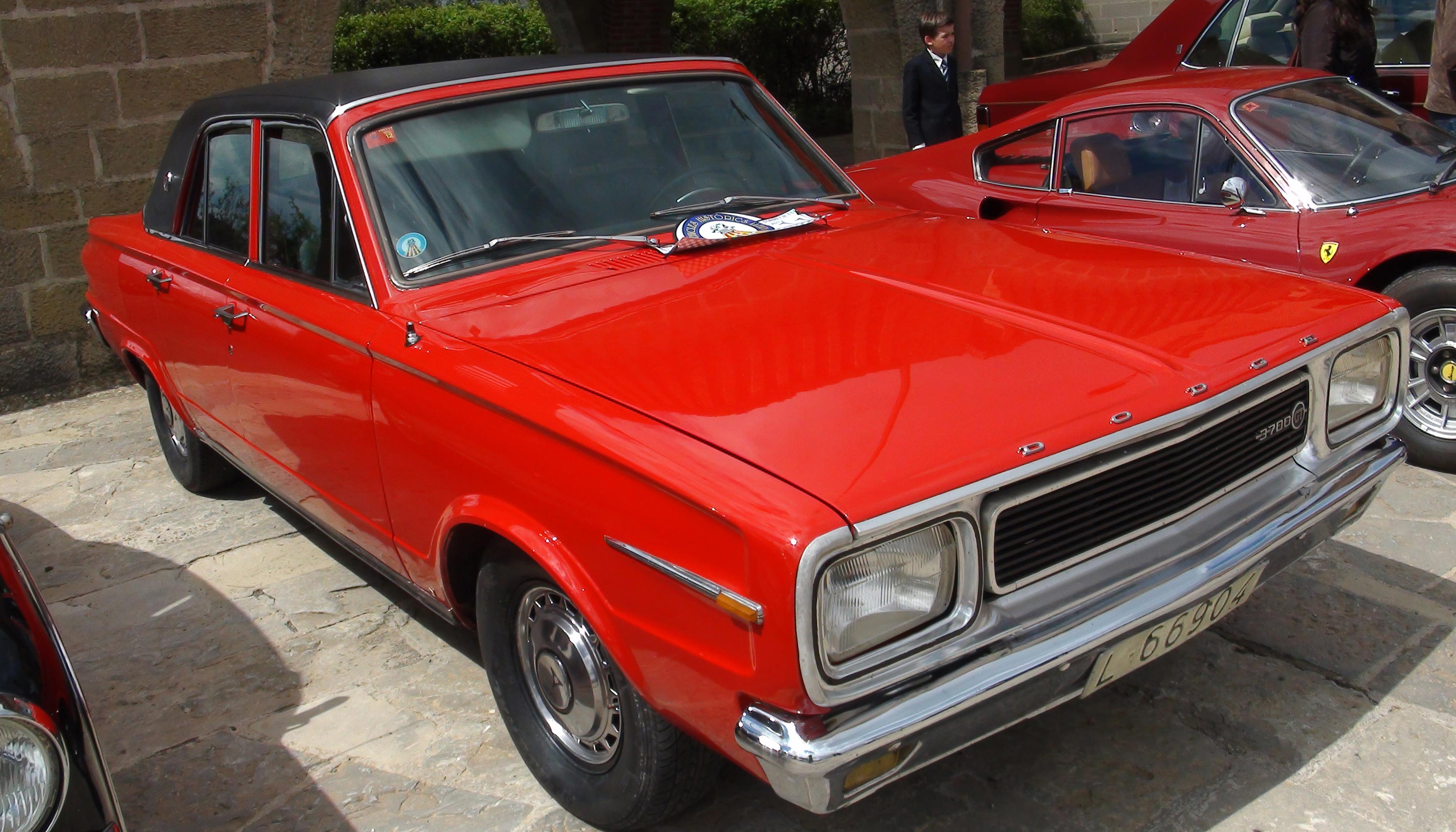
1969 Dart GT 3700 (facelift)

The Dart and the 3700 were the biggest national production car available in Spain during all production years. It was an expensive luxury car with very low fuel economy by Spanish standards. Nonetheless, it was considered an economic car for its size in those few markets to which it was exported. In Switzerland, for instance, it was priced exactly the same as a V8-engined American-built four-door Dodge Dart Custom and had only slightly less power, but was taxed considerably less. These vehicles were also exported to other European markets such as France and the United Kingdom but without much success. The Spanish Dodges never met sales goals and was an expensive failure for the Barreiros concern. The break-even point was 5,000 cars per year, a goal which was only surpassed once, in 1966. The Barreiros brothers were forced to sell off the company which was reorganized as Chrysler España, S.A.

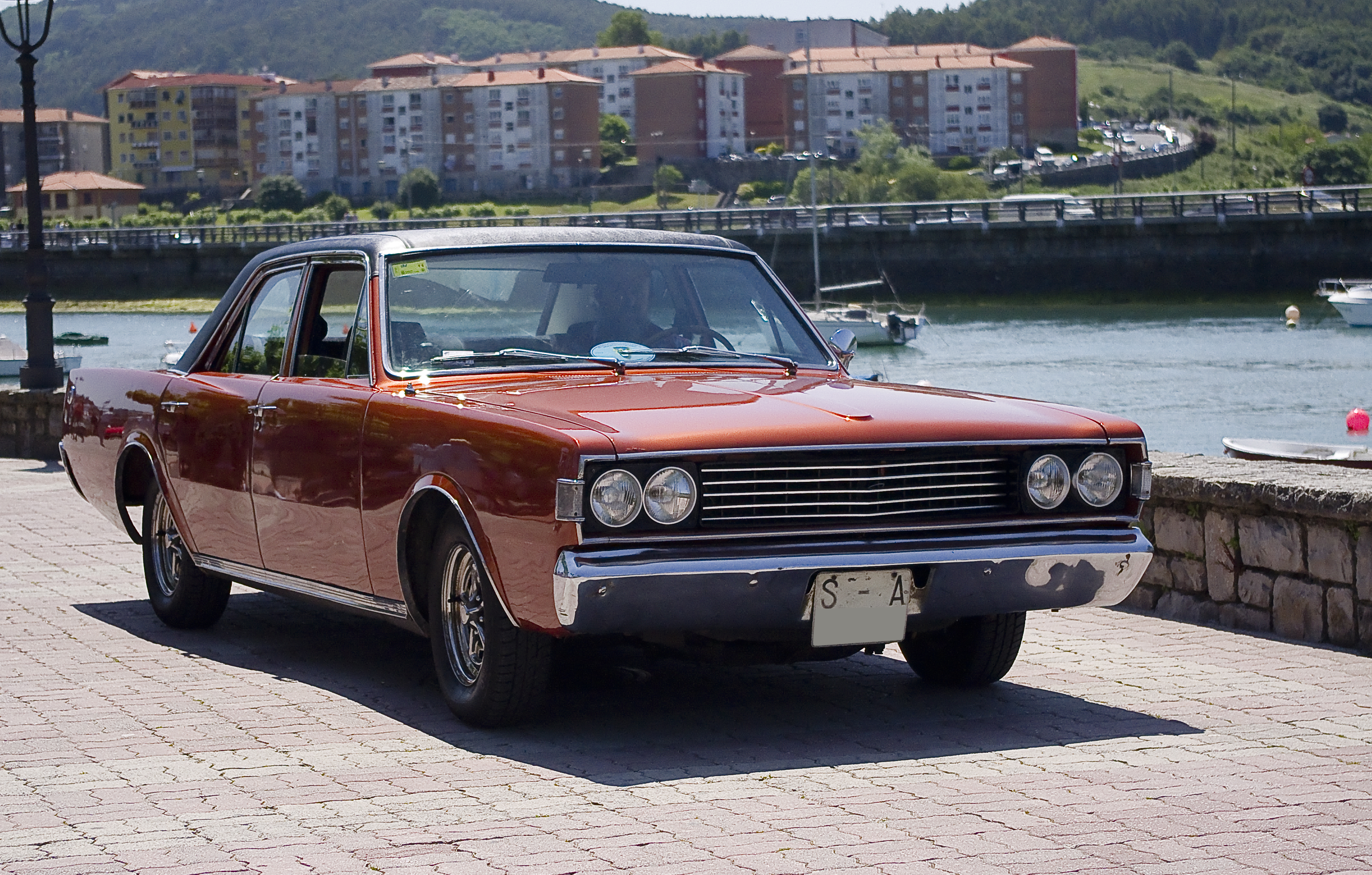
A-bodied Dodge 3700 GT

The Dodge Dart GL was a luxury model, while the GT was the sporty version. The base version has a three-speed manual transmission, while the GT came with either a four-speed manual or a three-speed automatic - this was the same unit as the one mounted in the Chrysler 2 L.

The gasoline Darts had the biggest engine ever mounted into a mass-produced car in Spain, the 225 cu in (3.7 L) Chrysler slant-six engine. The "3700" number is a reference to the 3.7 litres of displacement. No other six-cylinder engine car has been produced as much in Spain.

A diesel Dart (named "Barreiros diesel") was also produced. These models, mainly intended for taxi use, were very basic and very slow. They have 7-inch round headlamps rather than the large oblong units on fancier Spanish Darts, and use the round taillights from the first generation Simca 1000. The engine was the Barreiros C65, a 2,007 cc (122.5 cu in) inline-four with 65 PS (48 kW) at 4,500 rpm. Top speed was claimed to be 124 km/h (77 mph).

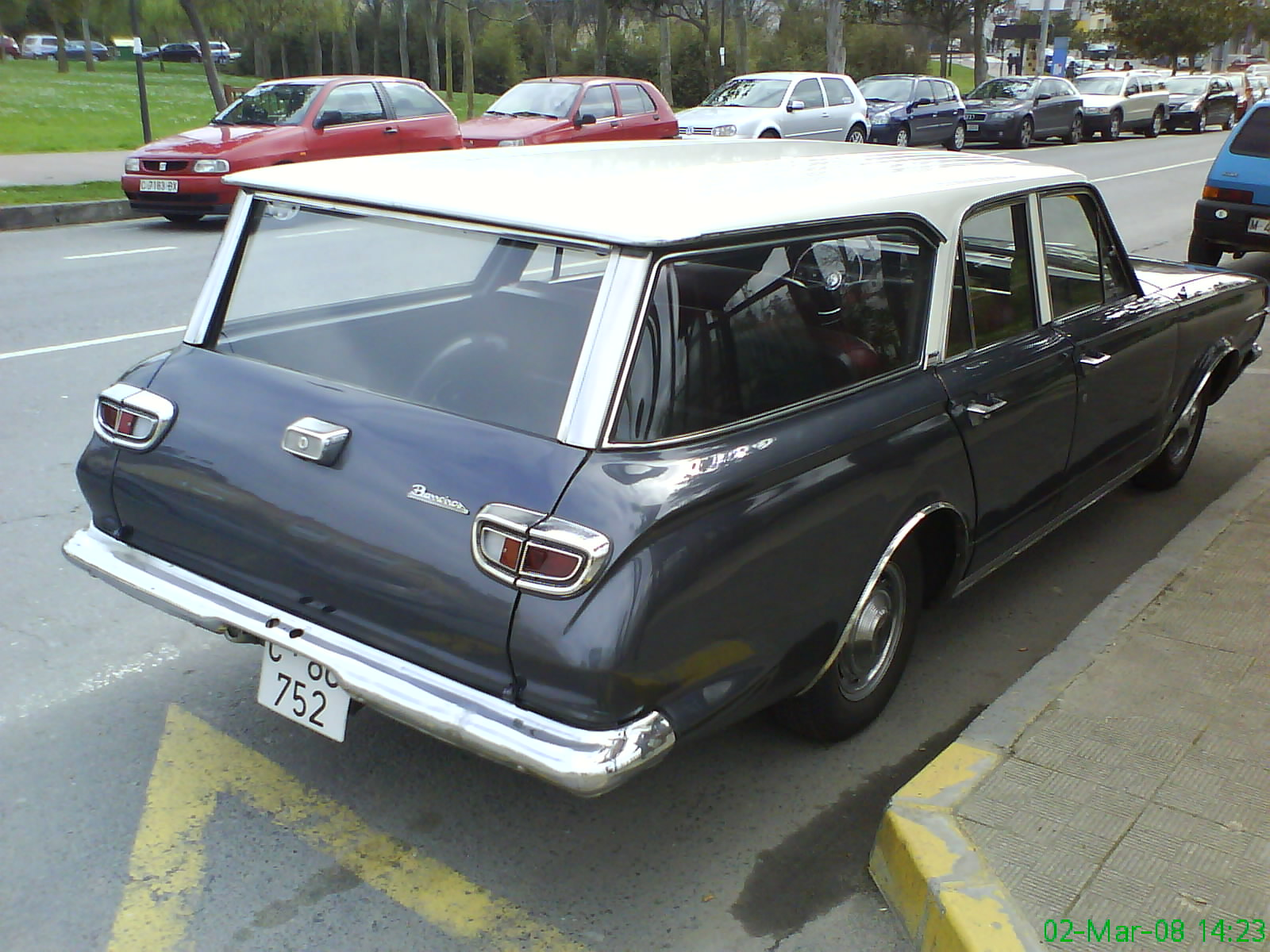
1969 Dart GLE Familiar

There was also a station wagon version, as well as variants (diplomatic motorcade cars, ambulances, hearses, etc.)

Production of Spanish Dodges stopped in 1977. Peugeot bought the Villaverde factory, as Chrysler was divesting their European operations in Spain, France, and the United Kingdom.

Spanish Dodges were popular with members of the Spanish government during the 1960s and 1970s. Admiral Luis Carrero Blanco was killed on 20 December 1973 while traveling in his Dodge 3700 GT. On 12 June 1975, Fernando Herrero Tejedor, the Minister Secretary General of the Movimiento Nacional and the politician mentoring Adolfo Suárez, died in a car accident while travelling in his official Dodge 3700 in the municipality of Adanero. Peugeot would not market another large car in Spain similar to the size of the Dart (the previous Chrysler 180 was smaller) until the Talbot Tagora came out in 1980, albeit without much success.

Although being the only large Dodge produced locally in Spain, previous American models such as the Coronet and Meadowbrook were exported to Spain ever since the 1950s with moderate success.

=== Mexico ===
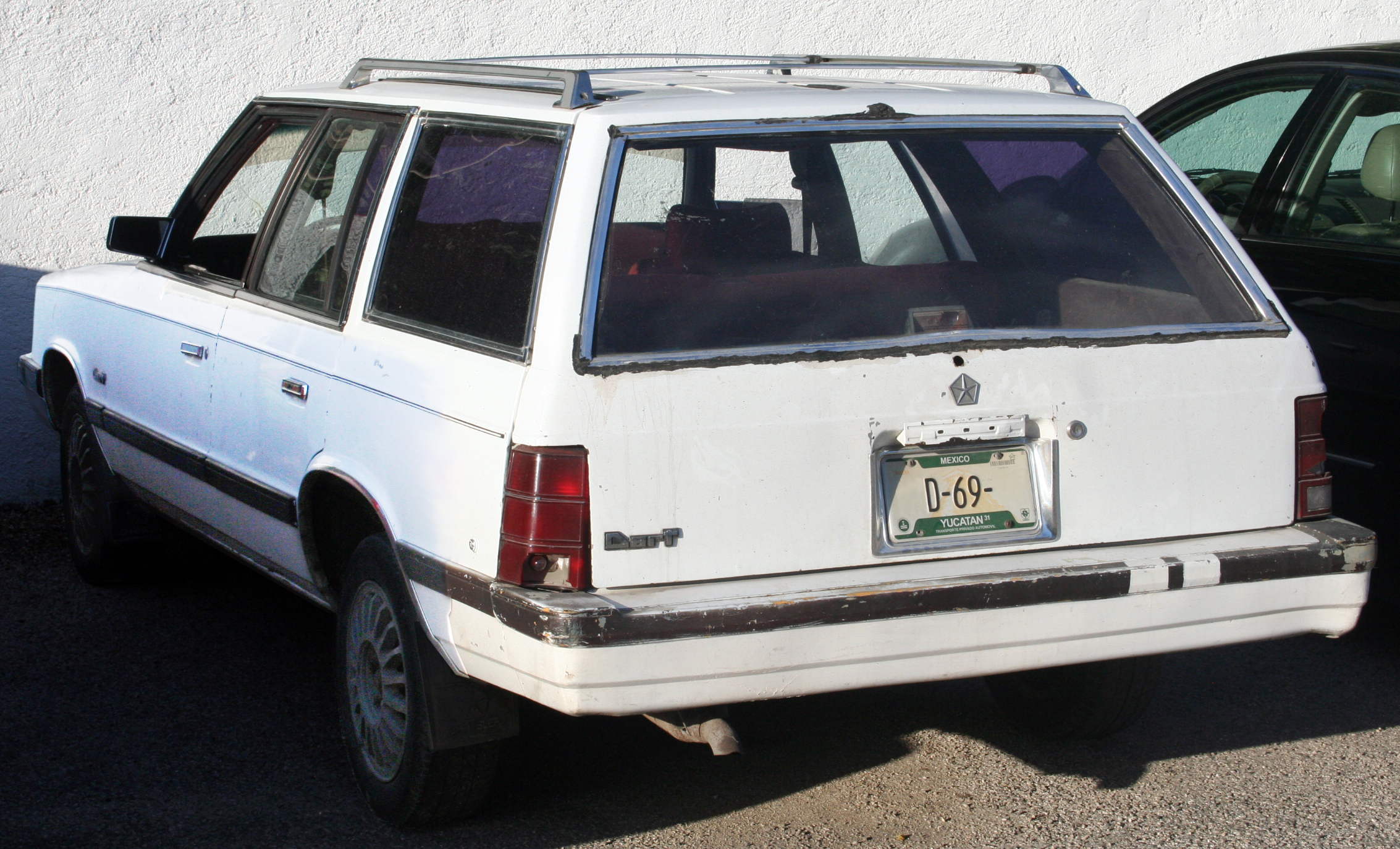
Mexican market Dart (K-body)

The Dart name (rather than Aspen) was applied to Dodge-branded F-body cars in Mexico, corresponding to the Mexican Chrysler-branded F-body cars badged as Valiant Volare (without the "é" in the "Volare" nameplate). The F-body was withdrawn from production worldwide after 1980, but in Mexico, the M-body was badged as a Dodge Dart for 1981 and 1982 using the front header panel from the discontinued 1980 Volare/Aspen, the K-body was sold as a Dodge Dart K (and as a Valiant Volare K) from 1982 to 1989, and the E-body was sold as the Dodge Dart Europa, officially badged as the Dodge Dart E, from 1986 to 1989. It was a downscale (lower price, cheaper trim) version of the American Dodge 600 4-door sedan. It replaced the Dart K 4-door sedan. Dart K 2-door and wagon models were sold alongside the Dart E until 1988 and the old SOHC I-4 2.2 L engine was replaced by the new 2.5 L I-4 for the 1987 season. These were the last new cars in the world to bear the Dodge Dart name until its revival in 2013. The Dart name was dropped when Chrysler de México introduced the Spirit in 1990.

== Epilogue ==
The Dodge Dart was sold alongside its replacement for part of the 1976 model year before it was discontinued in the U.S. and Canadian markets. Over its original 13-year production run, the Dart earned a good reputation. "The Dart was one of the most successful compact cars ever introduced in the American automobile marketplace," according to R. D. McLaughlin, then vice president of Chrysler's Automotive sales division, "It enjoys a strong owner loyalty and is a car that has established a reputation for reliability and value... these are [some] reasons why we will continue to market the Dart while introducing the new compact Aspen."

The A-body Dart was replaced by the F-body Dodge Aspen in late spring of 1976, alongside the somewhat larger M-body Dodge Diplomat (which was seen as a high end mid-size car or even a low end full-size car that was positioned between the Aspen and St. Regis). Nevertheless, as these cars were considerably too large for the compact car market, that segment would be occupied by the Omni for Dodge to compete in a rapidly changing automobile market. The Aspen was replaced in 1980 by the Dodge Aries and the Dodge 400 in 1982. These models would then be succeeded by the Dodge Spirit and later by the Stratus and Avenger sedans. The Diplomat would be produced until 1989 when it was replaced by the full-size Monaco and then the Intrepid. The Intrepid was then replaced by the Dodge Charger sedan. After 35 years, the Dodge Dart (PF) was resurrected for the 2013 model year as a nameplate in the domestic market to replace the Caliber as Dodge's compact passenger car.

== See also ==
- Spanish Dodge Darts
- Dodge Phoenix
