= DeSoto Diplomat =

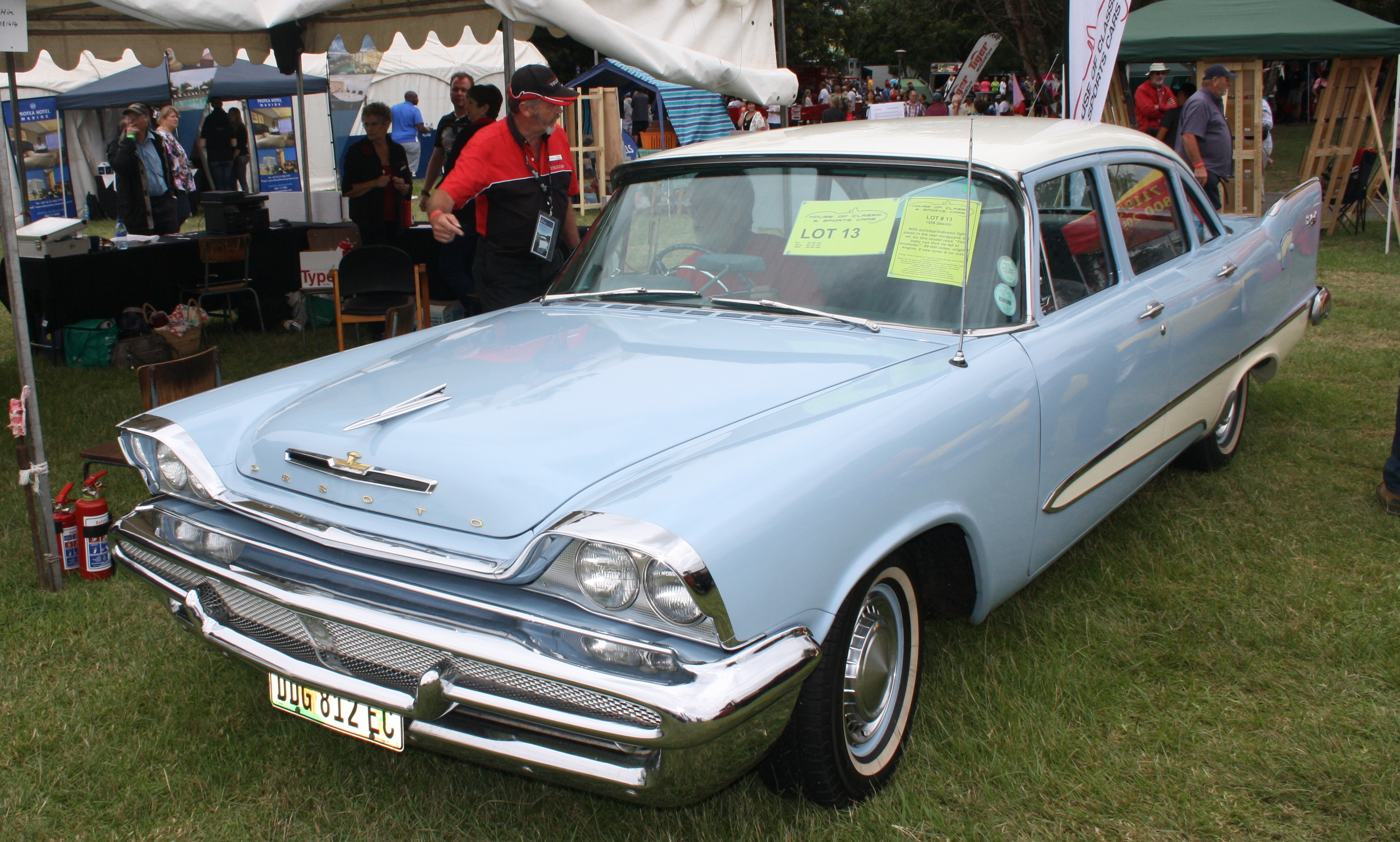
- 1958 DeSoto Diplomat 4-Door Sedan

Overview
- Manufacturer: Chrysler
- Also called: DeSoto Deluxe; DeSoto Powermaster; DeSoto Firesweep
- Production: 1946–1962
- Assembly: United States: Detroit, Michigan (Wyoming Assembly); Canada: Windsor, Ontario (Windsor Assembly); Australia: Mile End (Chrysler Australia); New Zealand: Petone (Todd Motors); South Africa

Body and chassis
- Class: Full-size
- Layout: FR layout

Chronology
- Successor: Chrysler Royal (Australia)

The DeSoto Diplomat is an automobile produced by DeSoto from 1946 to 1962 for sale in export markets outside of North America.

The export DeSoto based on the Plymouth was first introduced in 1937 and was built in Detroit. Chrysler Corporation of Canada, which before 1947 enjoyed "Imperial Preference" (reduced tariff barriers in British Empire markets) and did not start building export DeSotos until late in the 1939 model year.

In 1946, the export DeSoto became the DeSoto Diplomat. They were either fully imported into, or assembled locally (from CKD kits) in, Europe, South Africa, South America, Hawaii, New Zealand, and Australia. In 1955, Chrysler of Canada did not export any cars and all 1955 Diplomats came from Detroit. In the late 1950s, some European taxicab drivers preferred to have a Perkins P4C diesel engine in the Diplomat; these diesel engines were installed on a Belgian assembly line.

From 1938 to 1956, the export DeSoto used Plymouth bodies with a grille that looked similar to the regular DeSoto but fit the Plymouth grille opening. From 1957 to 1959, the DeSoto Diplomat used the DeSoto Firesweep front clip with Plymouth body.

The 1960 and 1961 DeSoto Diplomats were based on the full-size Dodge Dart. Although 1960 was the last year for DeSoto in Canada and 1961 for the United States and export markets, Chrysler South Africa built a number of 1962 DeSoto Diplomats based on the Dodge Dart 440 sedan. After 1962, the Diplomat name was retired and the Dodge Dart was marketed under its own name in South Africa.

16 years after DeSoto ended production, Chrysler would revive the Diplomat name for an M-body Dodge.

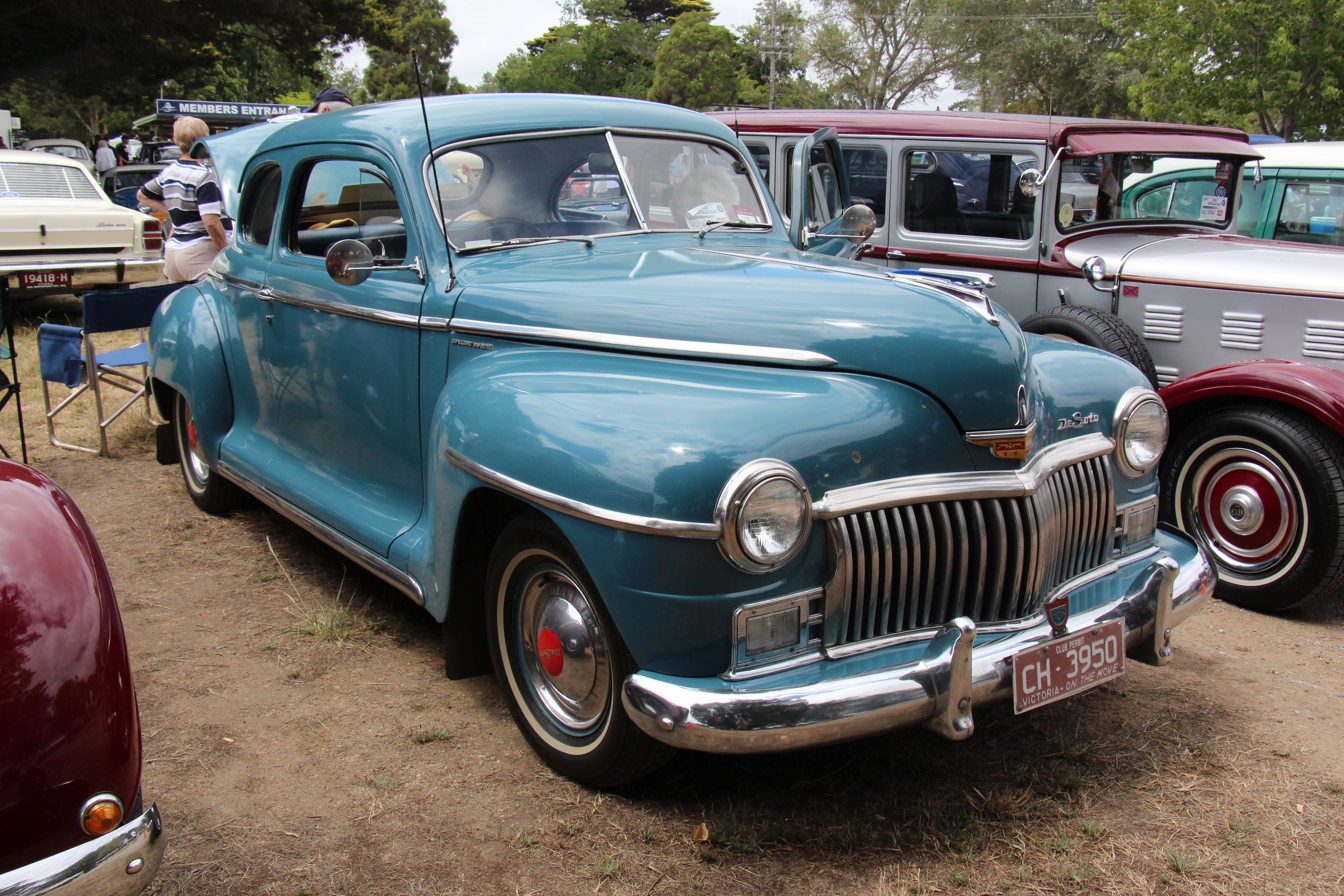
1946 DeSoto Diplomat Special Deluxe Coupe (SP15; Australia)

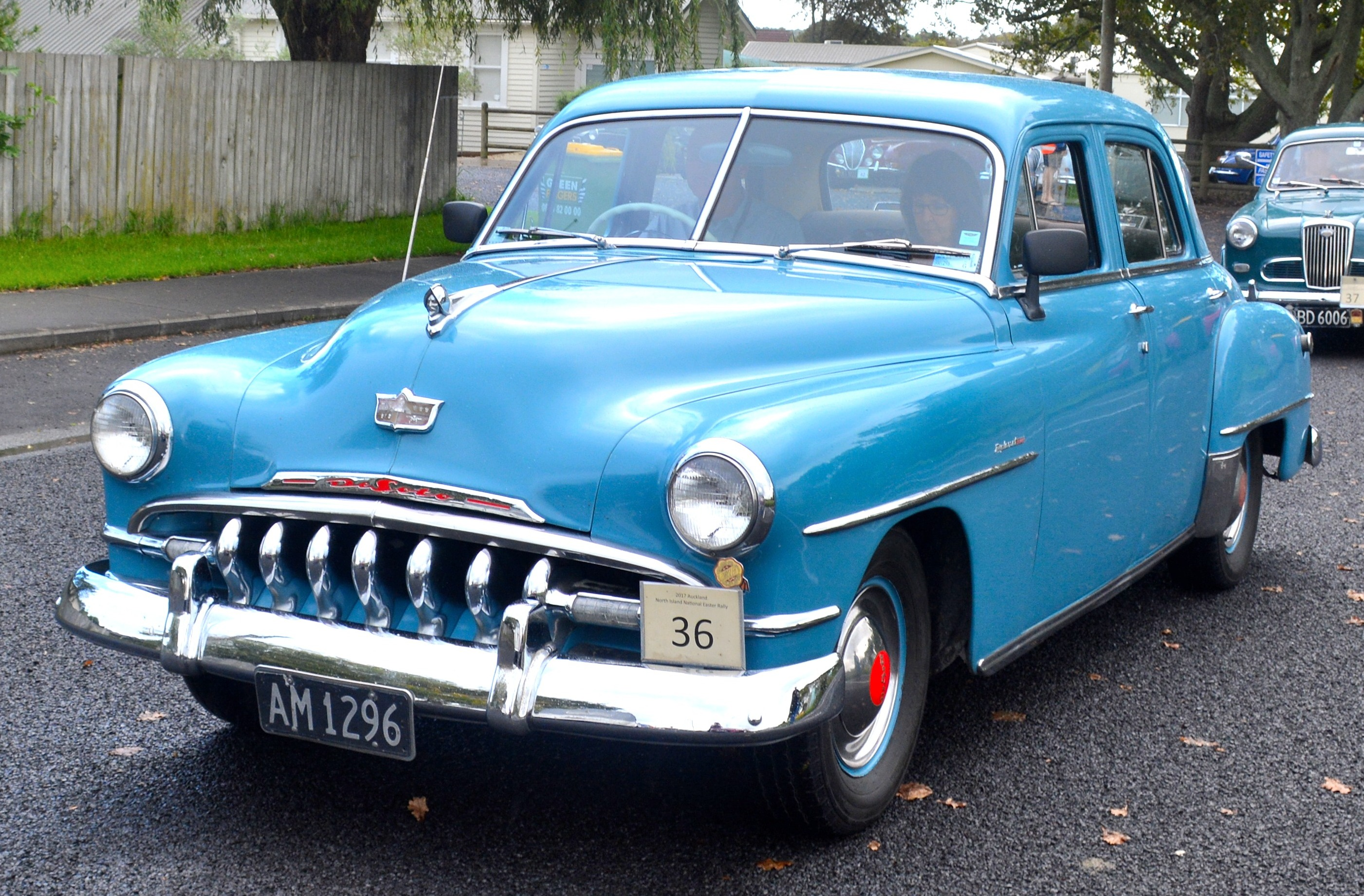
1952 DeSoto Diplomat 4-door sedan (New Zealand)

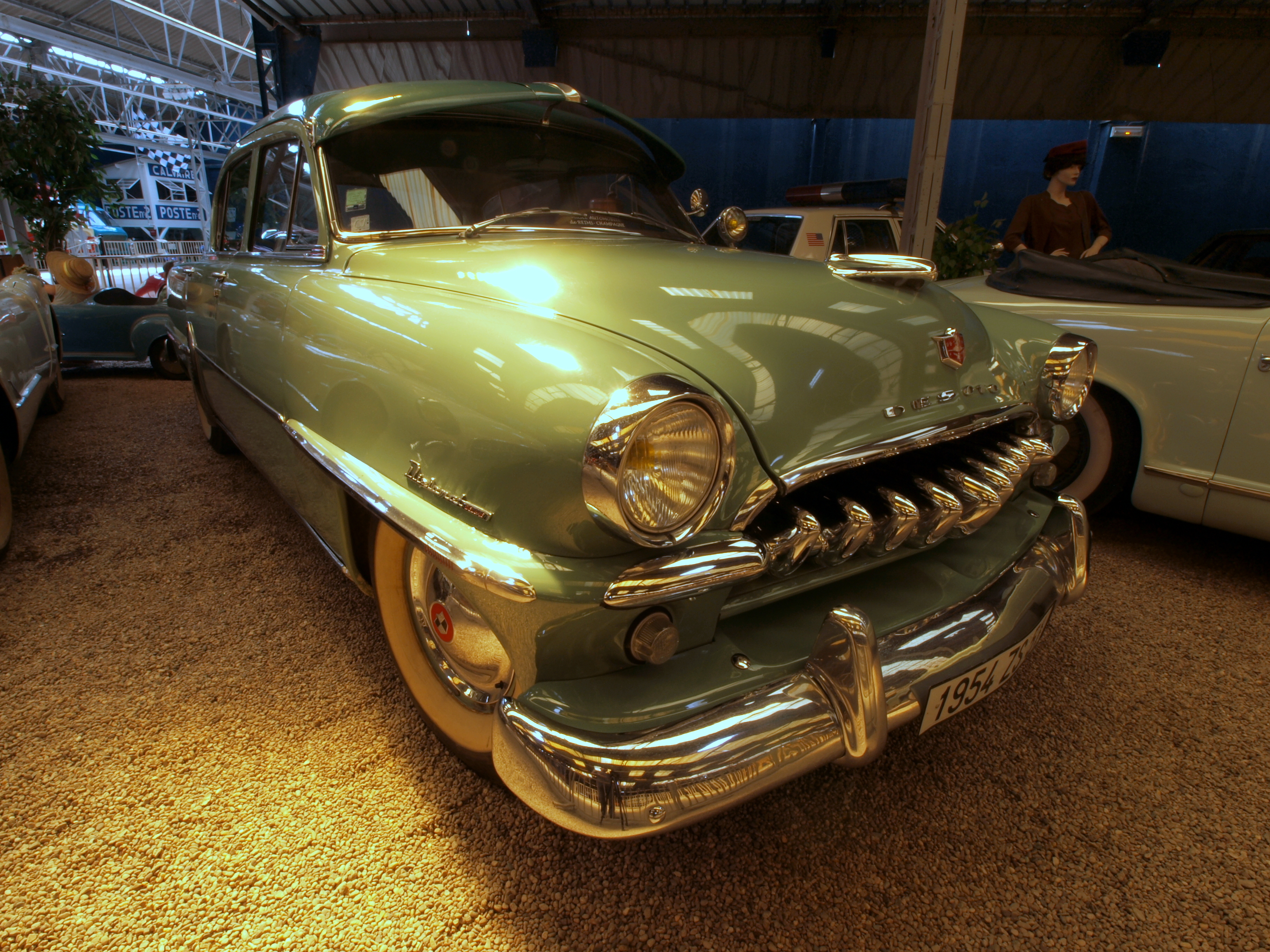
1954 DeSoto Diplomat

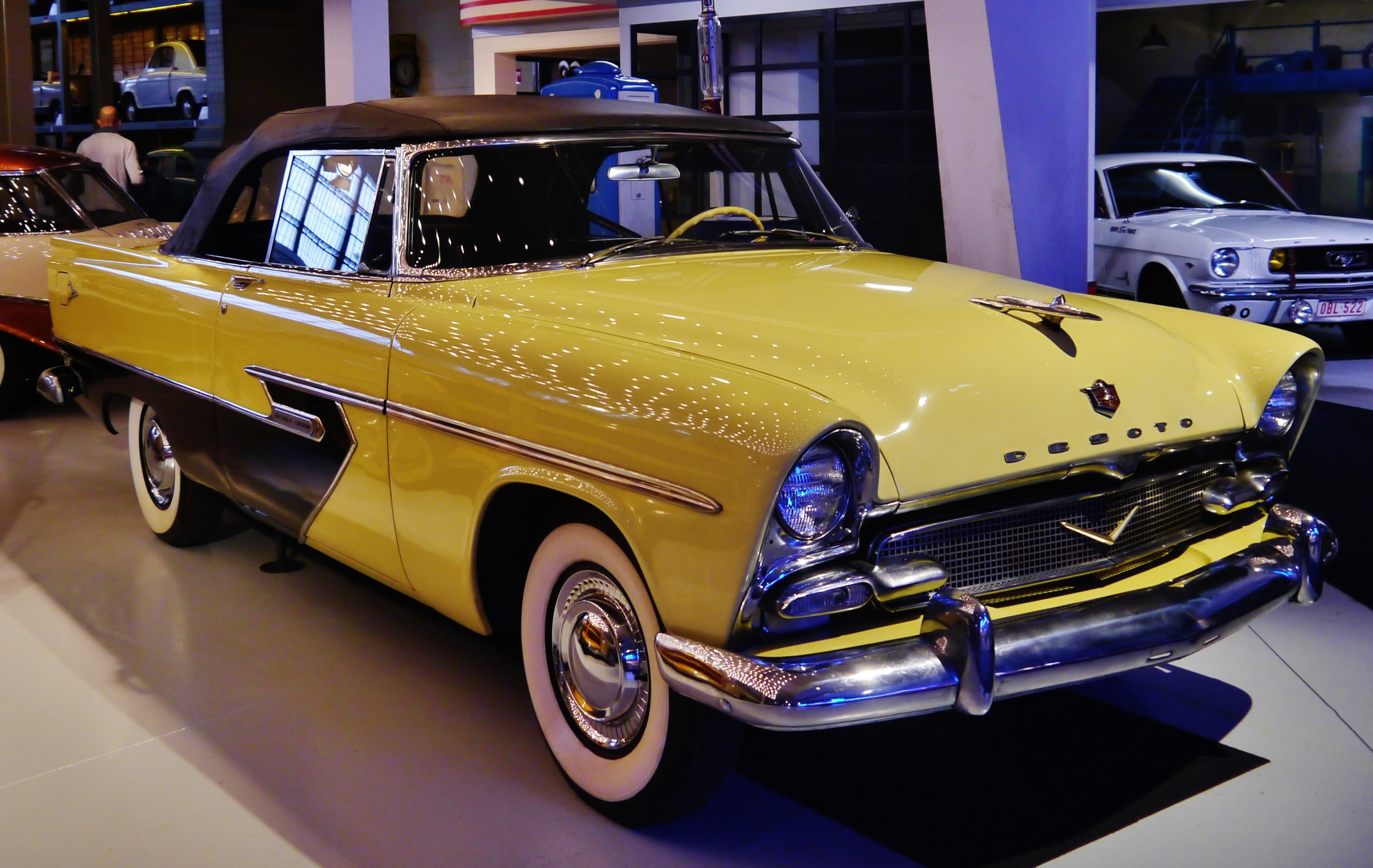
1956 DeSoto Diplomat Custom Convertible

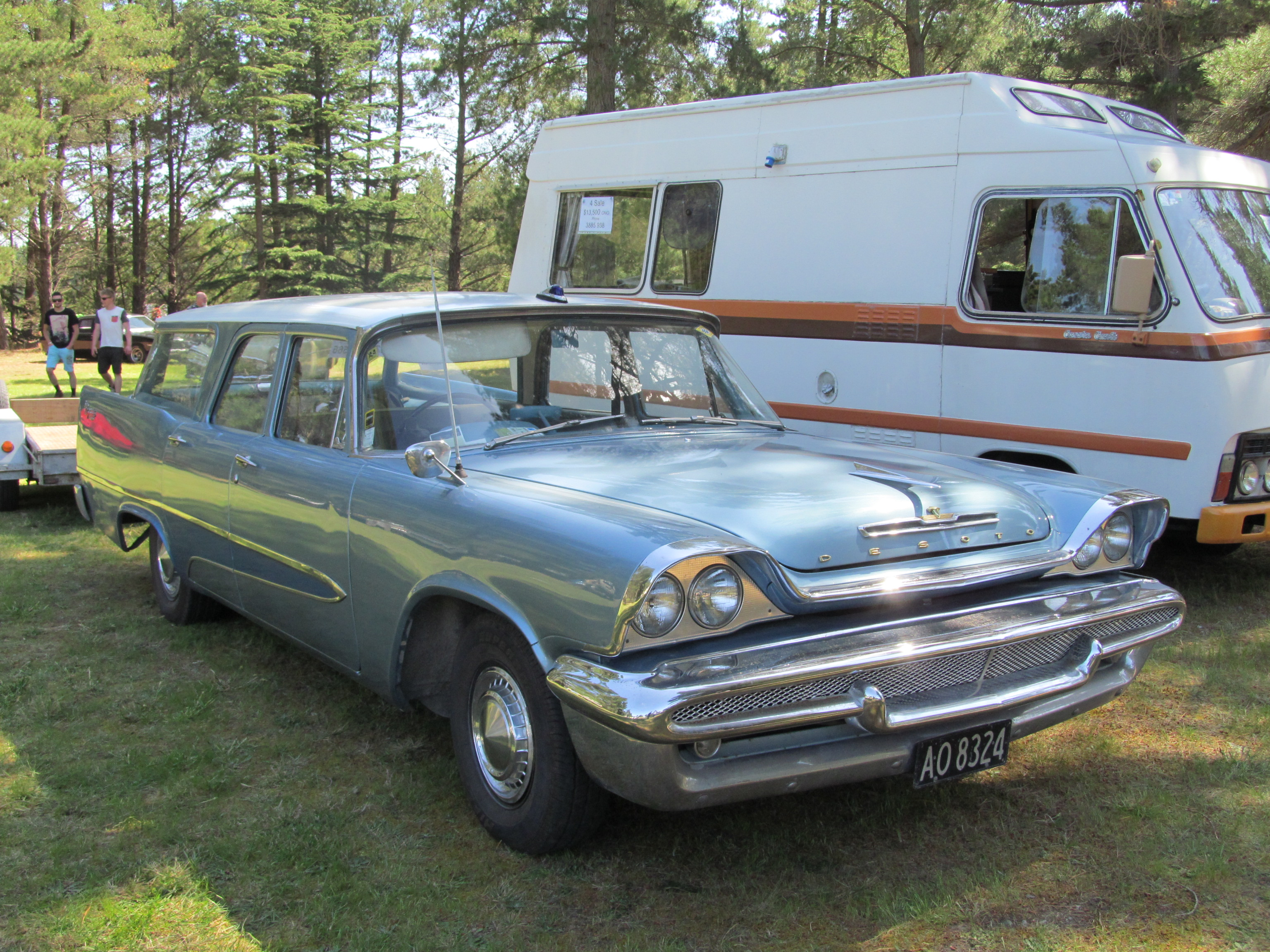
1958 DeSoto Diplomat 4-Door Wagon (New Zealand)

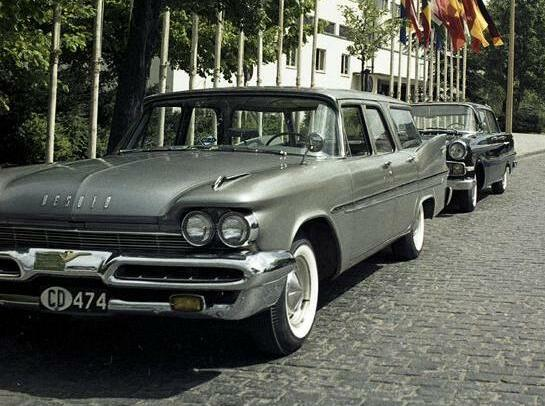
1959 DeSoto Diplomat 4-Door Wagon (Germany)

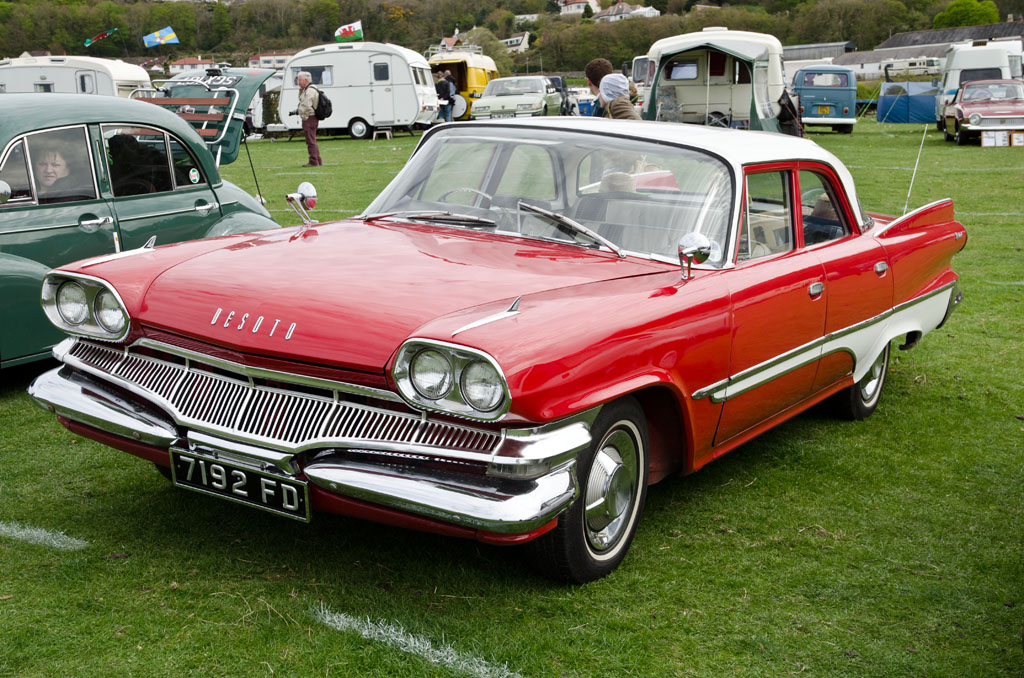
1960 DeSoto Diplomat 4-Door Sedan

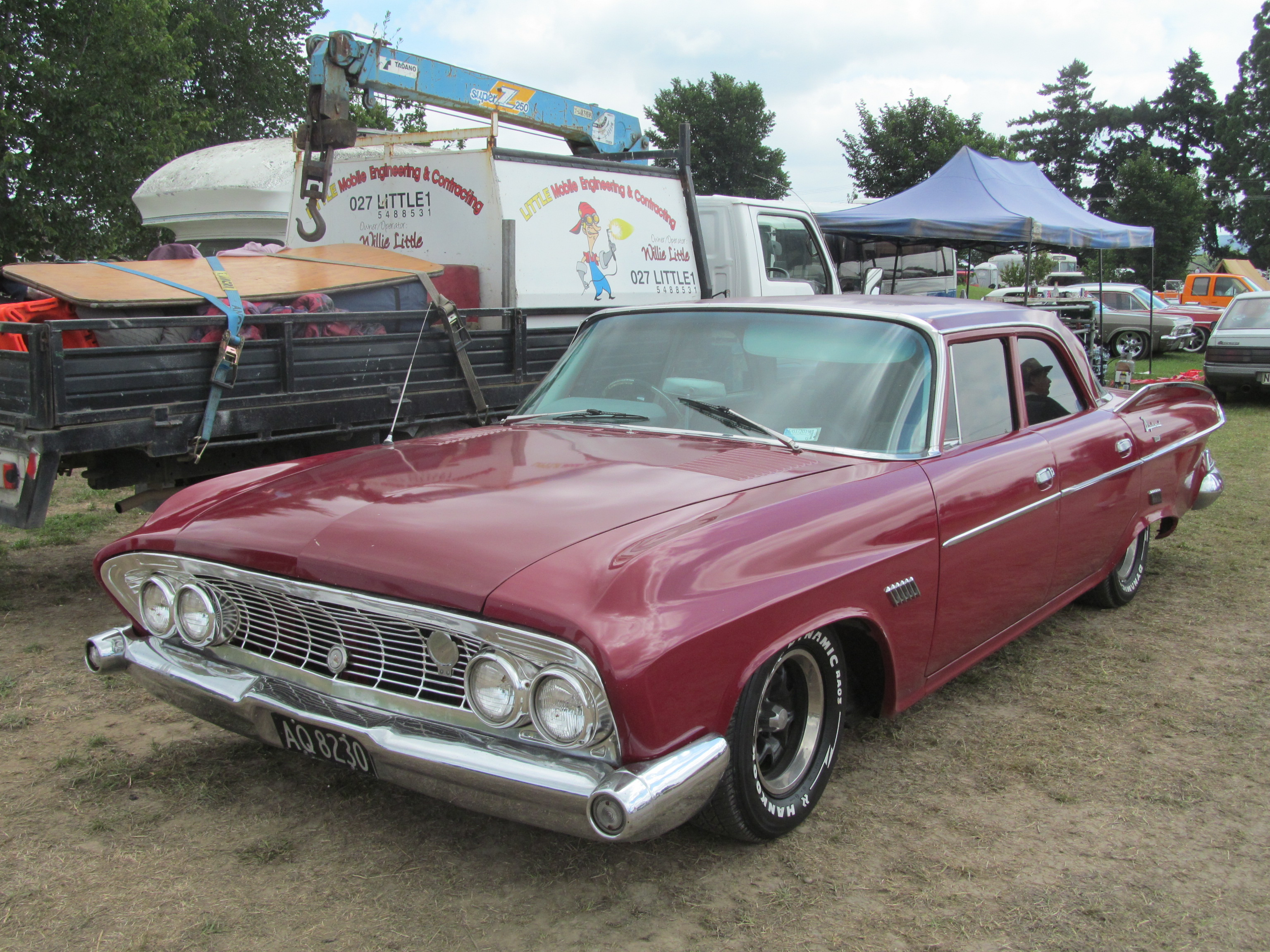
1961 DeSoto Diplomat 4-Door Sedan (New Zealand)

== Australian production ==
Chrysler Australia introduced a locally produced SP24 series DeSoto Diplomat, based on the 1953 US Plymouth P24 in 1953. This was followed by the SP25 series Diplomat which was based on the 1954 US Plymouth P25 Plymouth Belvedere, and was built from 1954 to 1957. The Diplomat was available in "Custom", "Regent" and "Plaza" trim. An Australian developed Coupe Utility version of the Sedan was introduced in 1956. The Diplomat models were an alternative to the Plymouth Savoy and Plymouth Belvedere or the Dodge Kingsway which, aside from differences in grilles and badging, were essentially the same vehicle. All used the same basic body and all models combined managed to take only 5% of the Australian market in 1955. The Diplomat was replaced by the Australian-built Chrysler Royal, which was derived from the Australian-built P25 Plymouth and was built from 1957 to 1963.

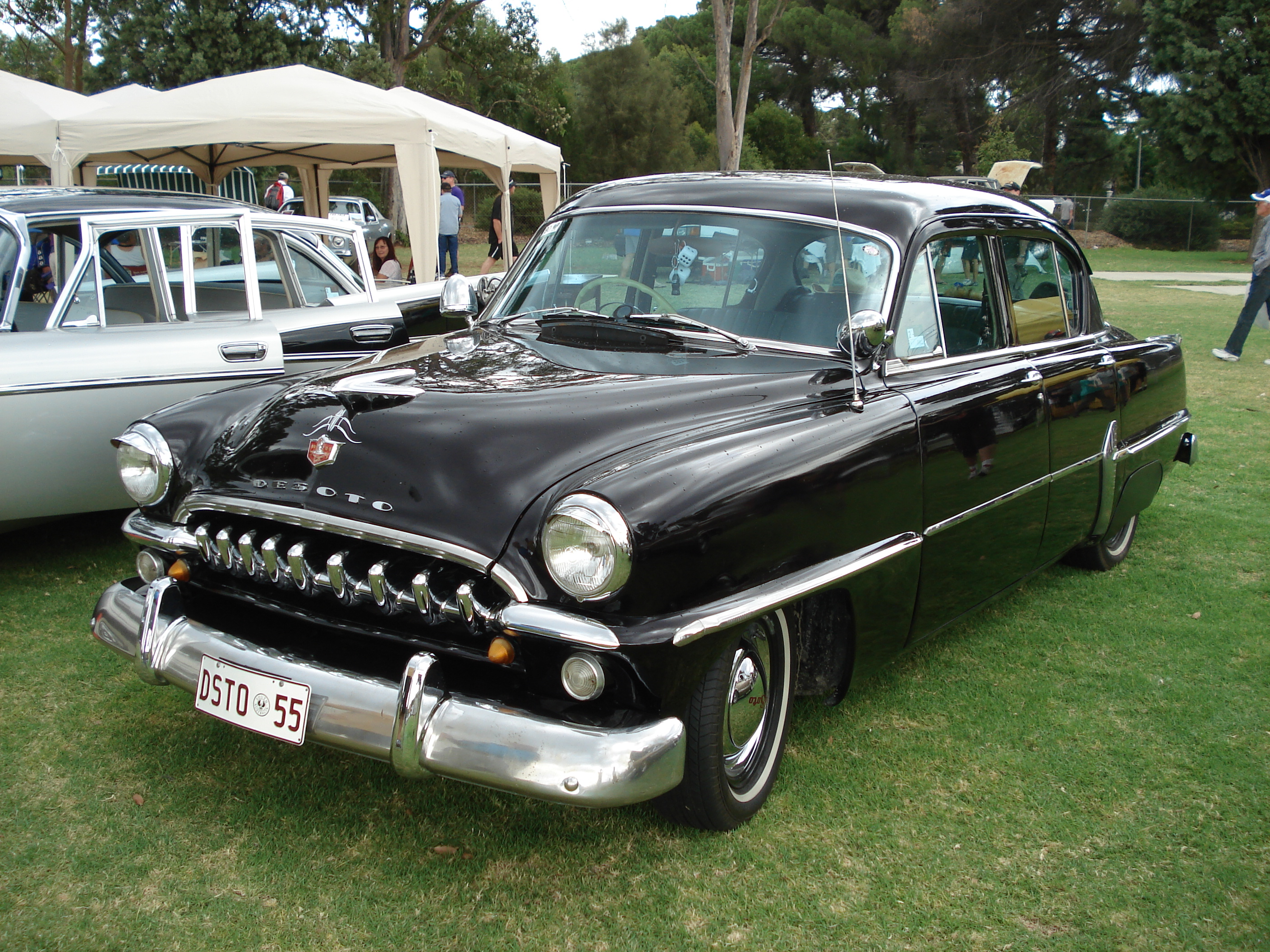
1955 DeSoto SP25 Diplomat sedan

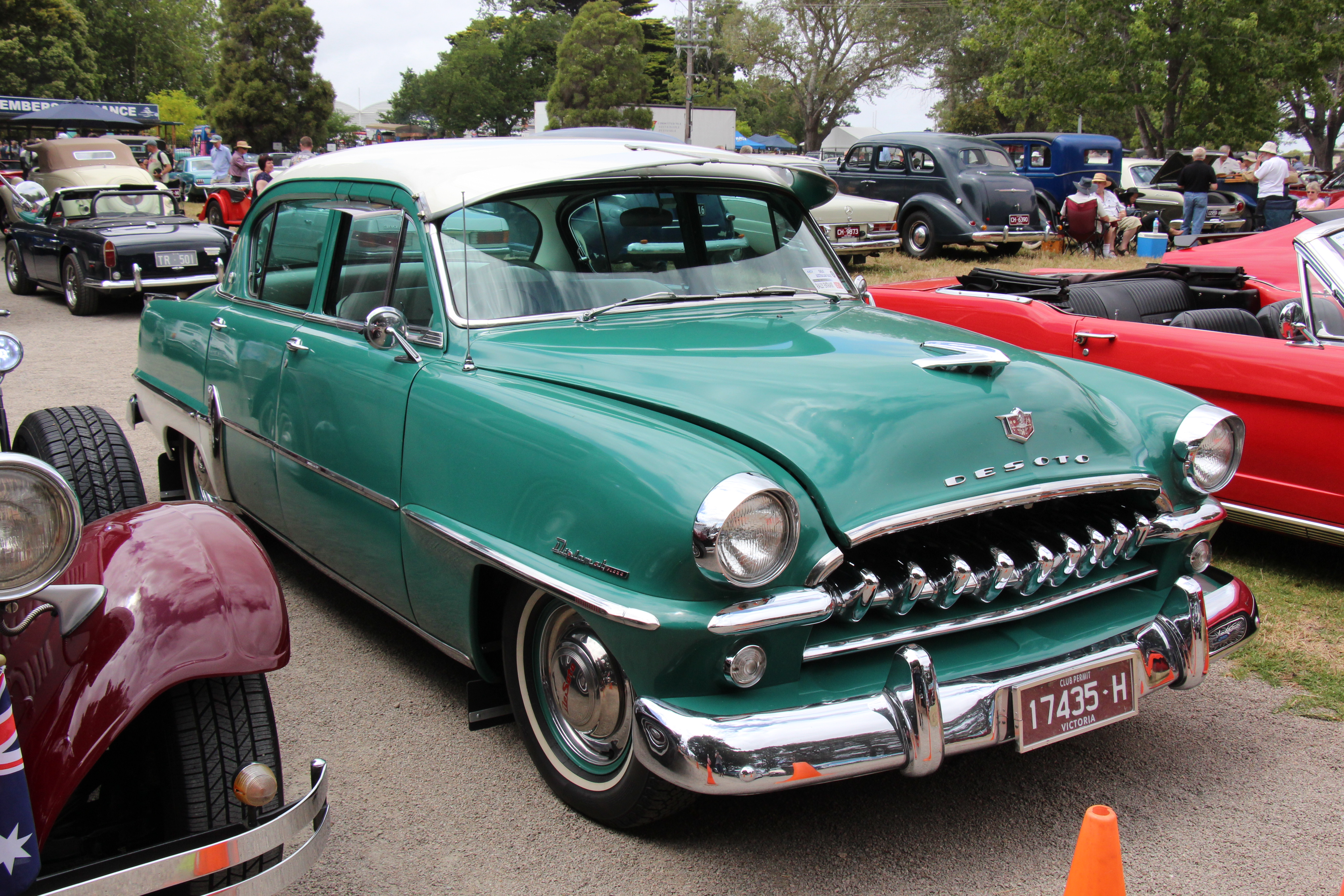
1955 DeSoto SP25 Diplomat Plaza sedan

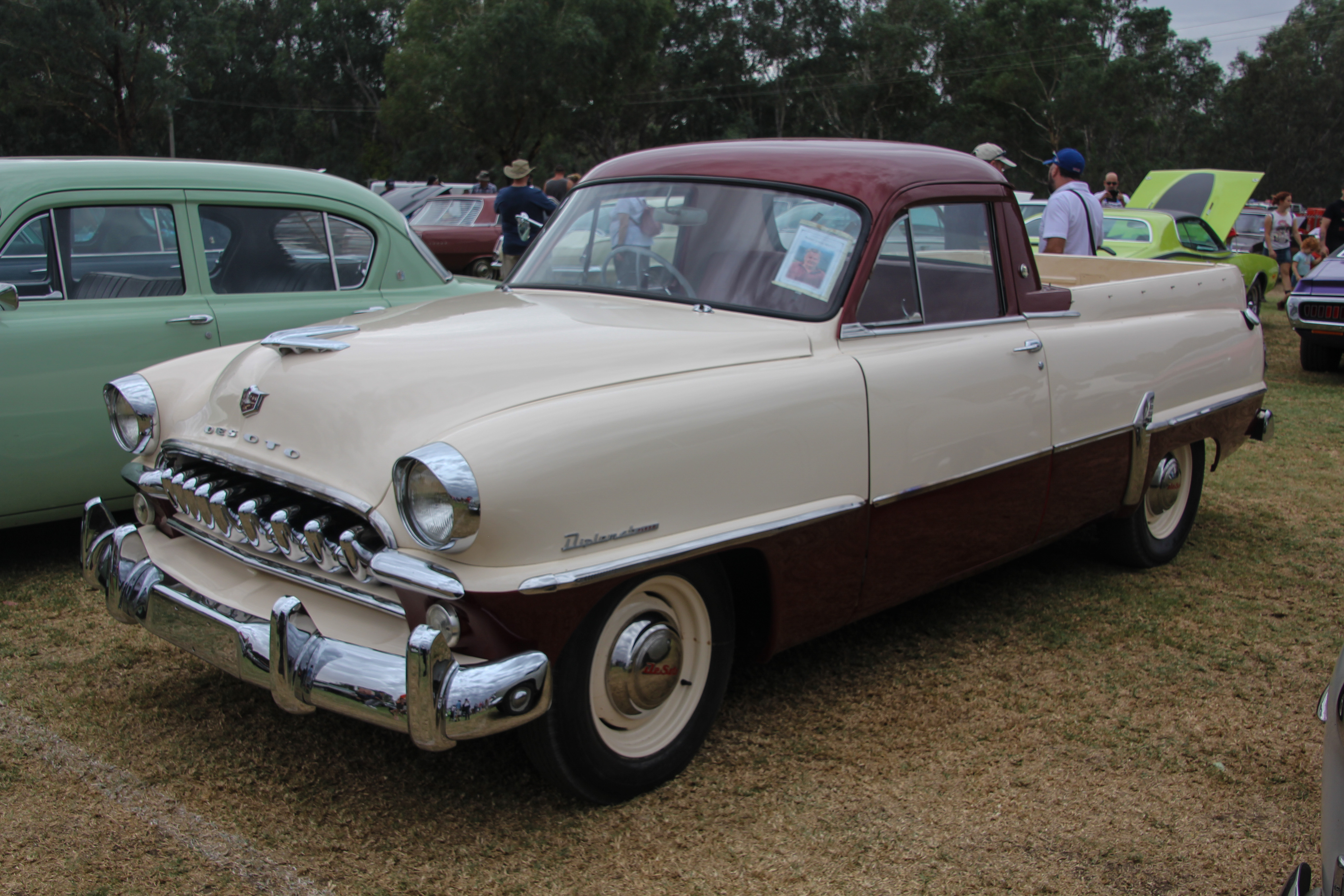
1956-57 DeSoto SP25 Diplomat Plaza coupe utility

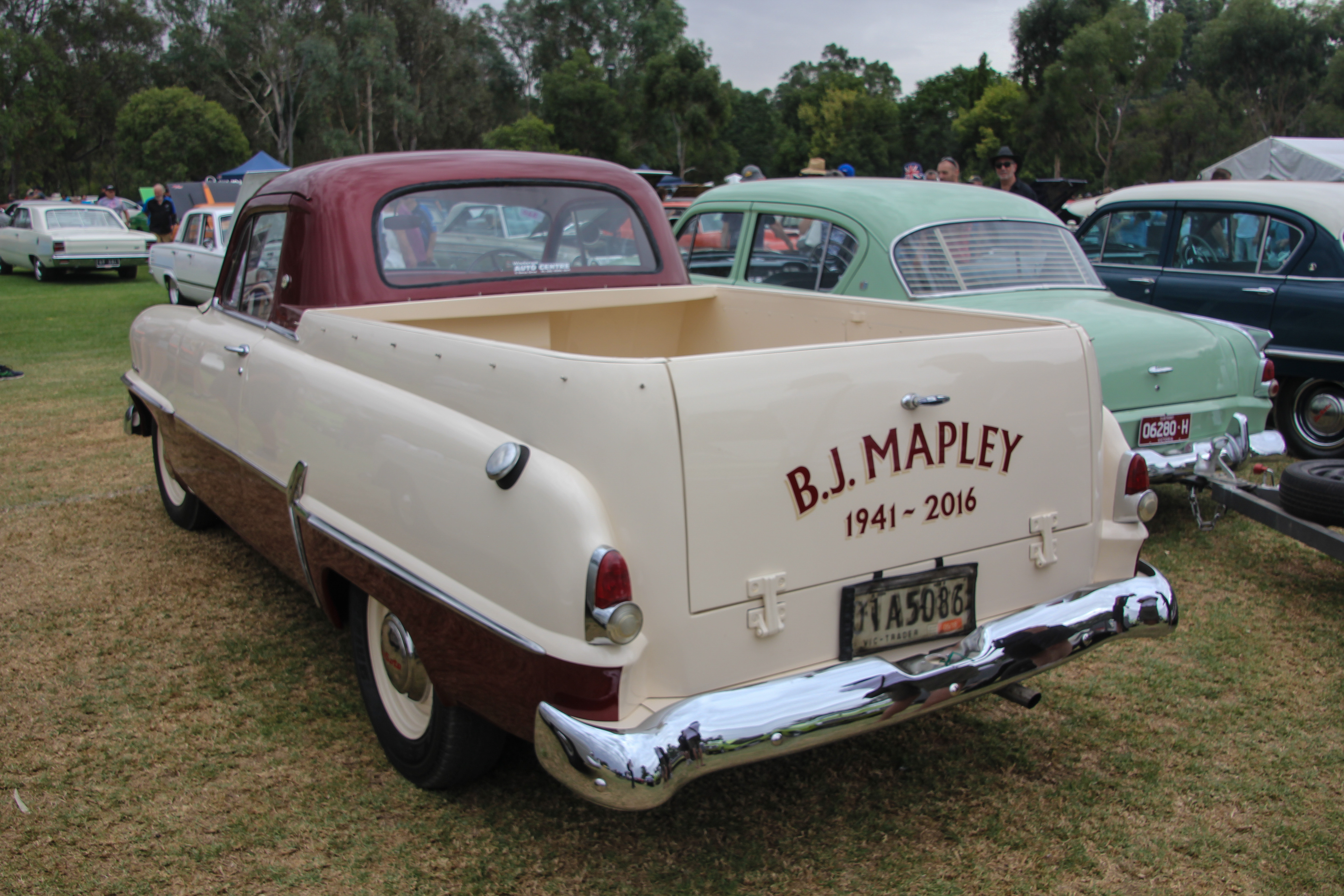
1956-57 DeSoto SP25 Diplomat Plaza coupe utility

== New Zealand production ==
In the early and mid 20th century the New Zealand automotive industry was fully independent from its Australian neighbour. This began to change after Australia introduced its own locally designed and built Holden, Ford, and Chrysler vehicles which gradually became the prevalent marques in New Zealand by the end of the 1960s. The DeSoto Diplomat introduced in New Zealand was exported from Canada directly to New Zealand and in factory right-hand-drive. Unlike Australia, New Zealand did not have the restrictions on imported vehicles which for the Australian market was to encourage local manufacture. Therefore, there are many variations between the New Zealand and Australian DeSoto models.

Chrysler of Canada built the export Plymouth-based DeSoto starting in 1939 and continued through to 1961, with the exception of 1955. For 1959 New Zealand saw the Canadian-built Diplomat Deluxe 4-door sedan, Dodge Kingsway Deluxe sedan and the Plymouth Belvedere sedan, all in factory right-hand-drive.

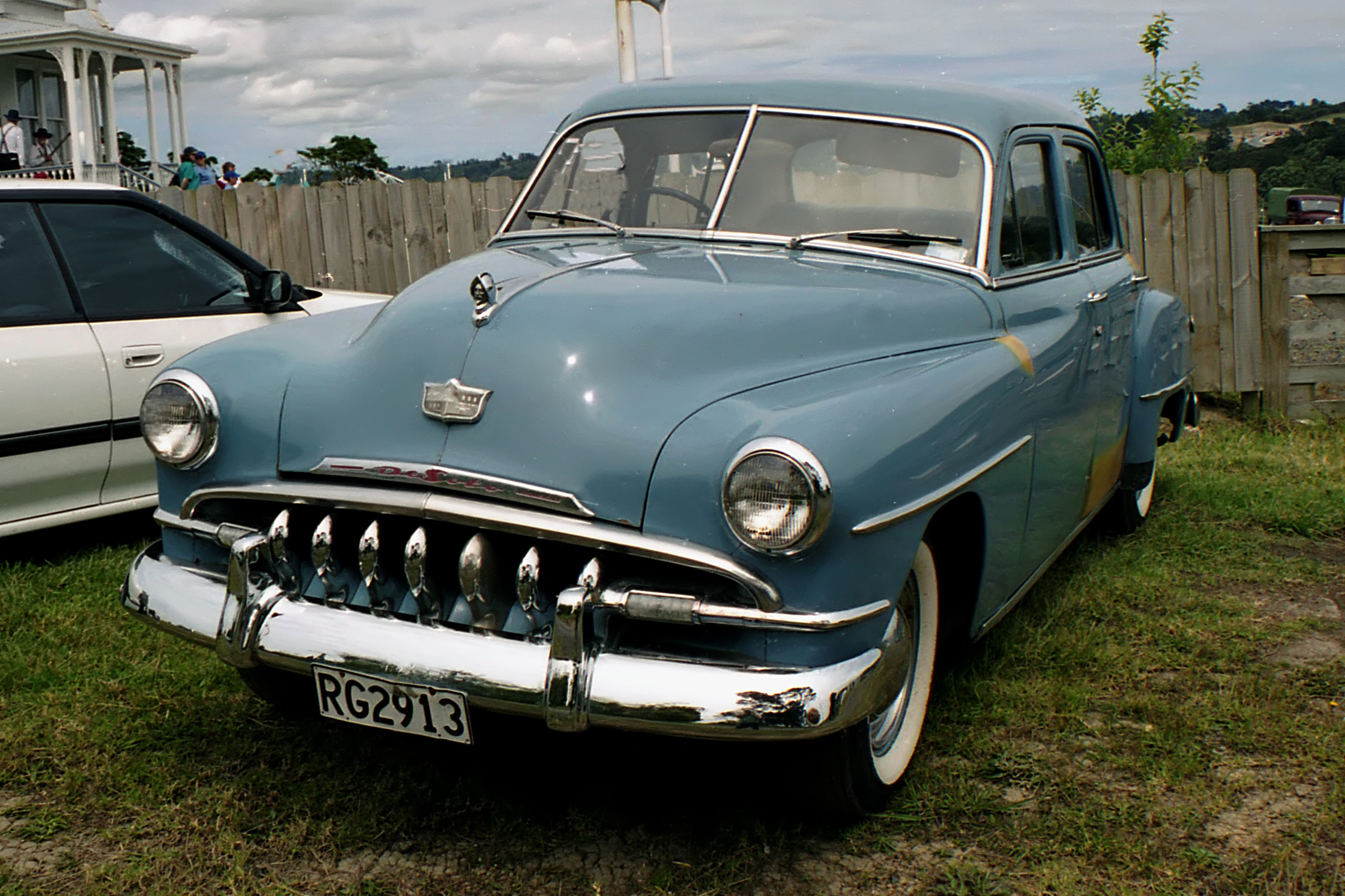
1952 DeSoto Diplomat (New Zealand)

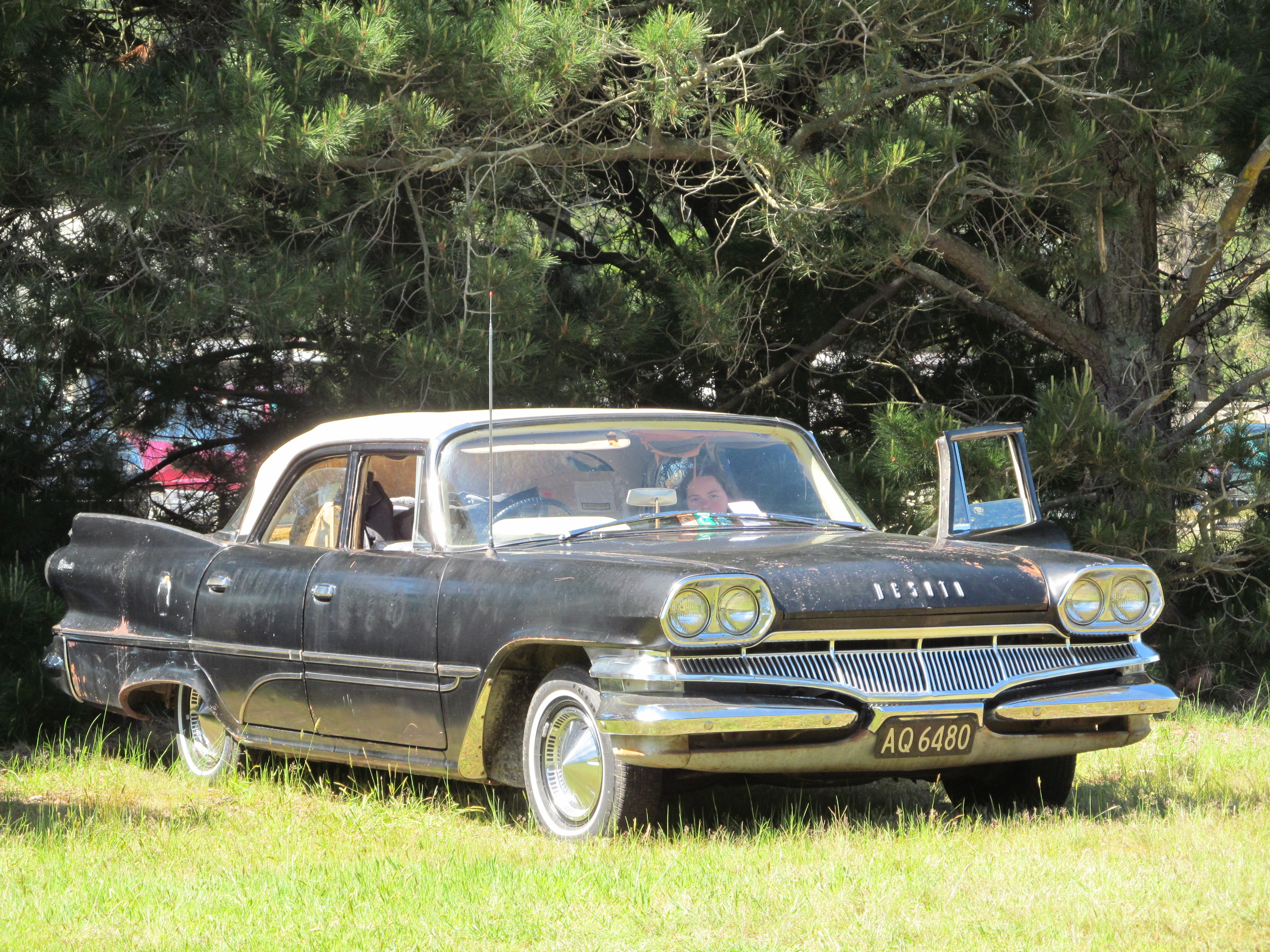
1960 DeSoto Diplomat (New Zealand)

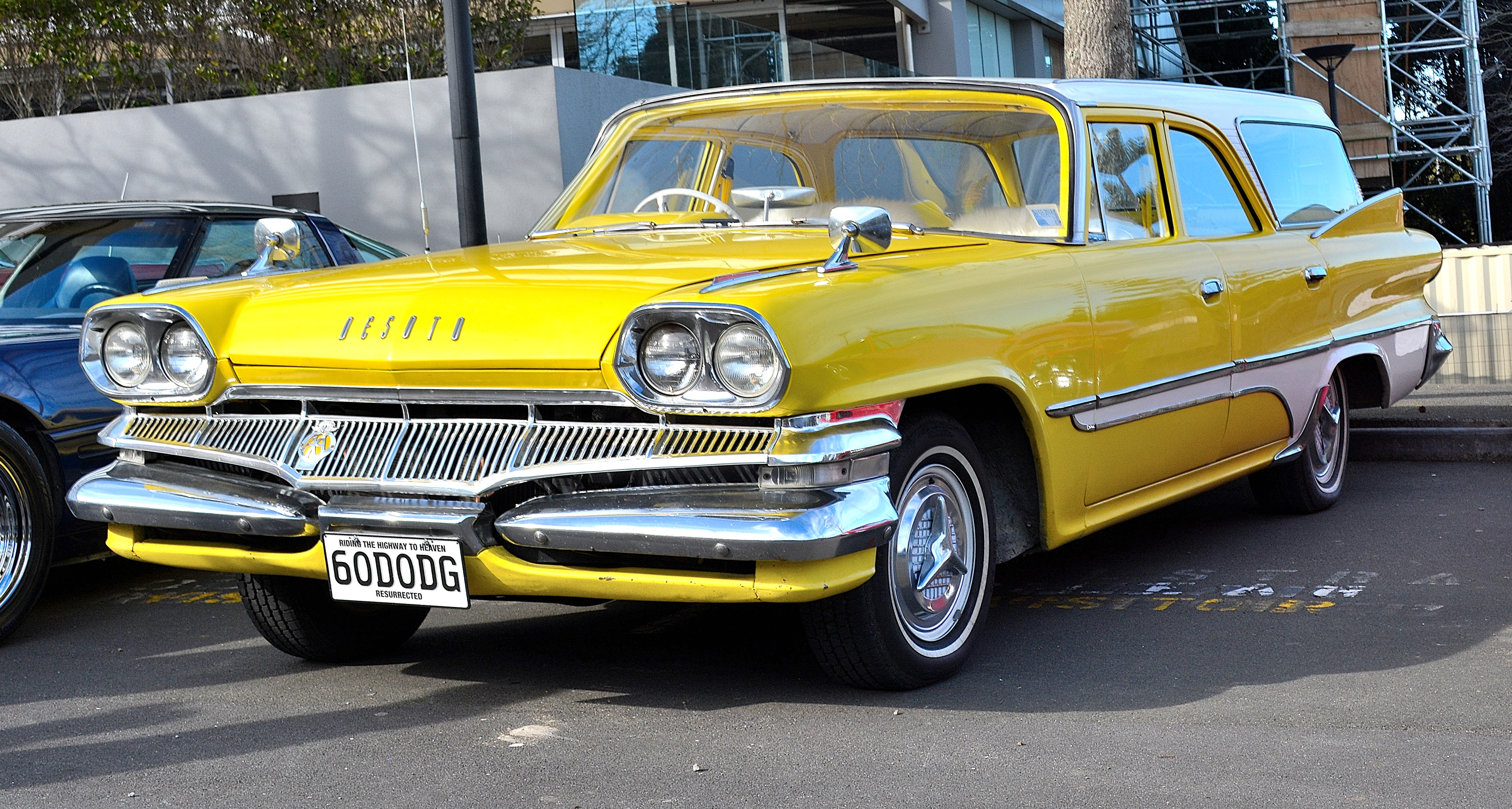
1960 DeSoto Diplomat station wagon (New Zealand)

== See also ==
- Dodge customRoyale
