= DeSoto Suburban =

Car model from 1946 through the 1954 model year

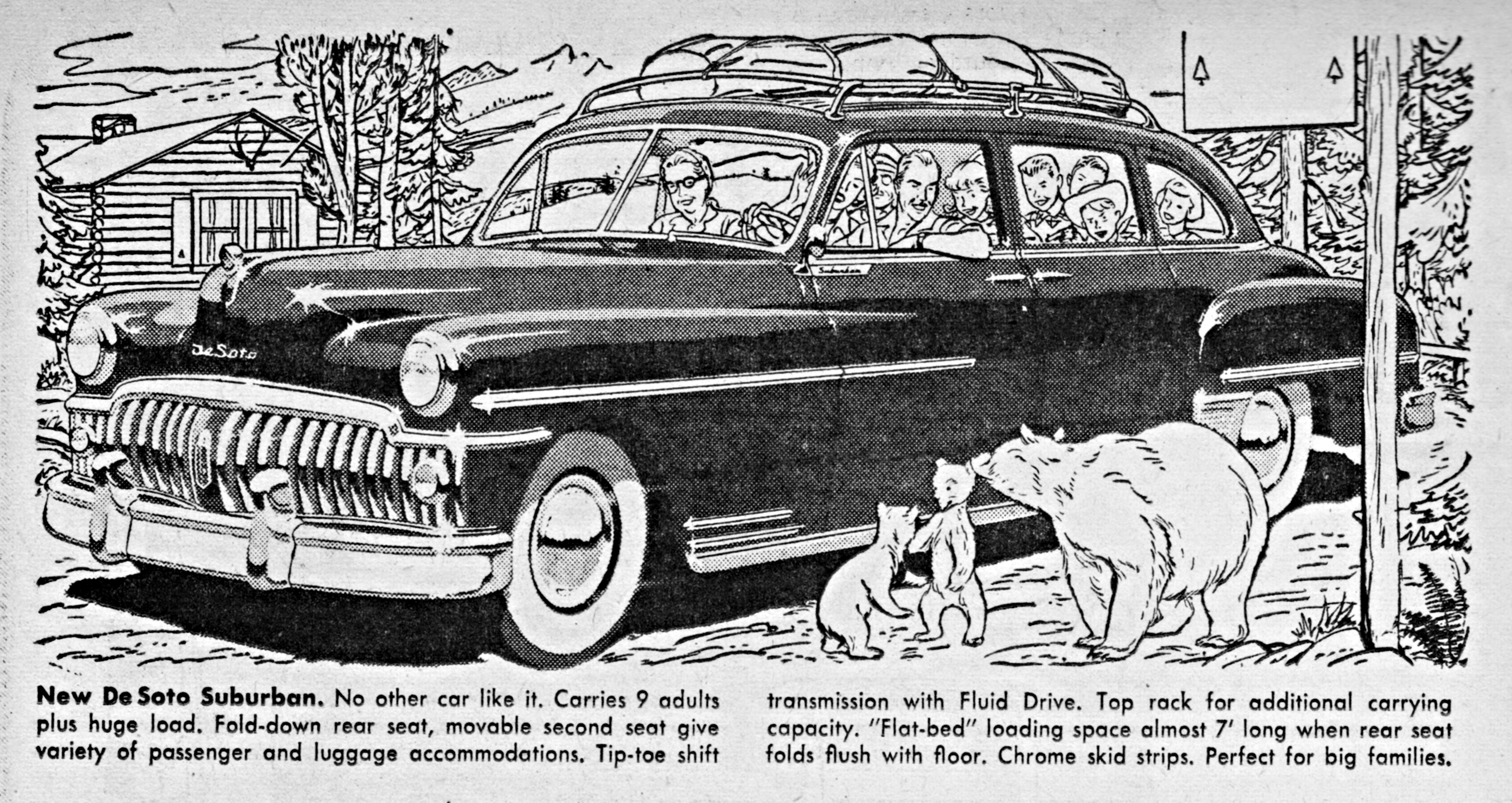
1950 DeSoto Suburban ad

The DeSoto Suburban is an automobile produced by DeSoto from 1946 through the 1954 model year. The Suburban was a continuation of DeSoto's long-wheelbase models, first introduced in 1946.

While in production, the Suburban was available under the DeSoto Deluxe, Custom and Powermaster model designations.

The Suburban differed from other DeSotos in that the four-door sedan rode a 139.5 in (3,543 mm) wheelbase, creating a car which was capable of carrying eight passengers as shipped from the factory. The car accomplished this eight-passenger capacity through the use of factory-installed jump seats. Suburbans were powered by Chrysler's inline six-cylinder engine, which delivered sufficient power to move the factory-complete car; at nearly two tons, the vehicle mated to this engine was capable of cruising speeds, but not jack-rabbit starts.

Most Suburbans were shipped with an optional rooftop luggage rack. With no station wagon in its line-up, the Suburban was at once a car for consumers who needed a large-capacity automobile, and a car almost ready-built for the taxi cab industry.

The Suburban also formed the base car for DeSoto's Custom Limousine model, an automobile rarely built on speculation, but more realistically upon customer orders. DeSoto dropped its limo build-outs at the end of the 1949 model year, finding it cheaper to sell and ship the cars to third-party vendors for customization.

Despite its popularity with taxi firms, DeSoto being the second most popular manufacturer to the industry leader Checker, Chrysler's planned 1955 restyle and the spin-off of Chrysler's Imperial into its own distinct series halted the long-wheelbase Suburban at the end of the 1954 model year.

== See also ==
- Plymouth Suburban
