= DeSoto Series S-10 =

American car model sold 1942, 1946–1952

Series S-10
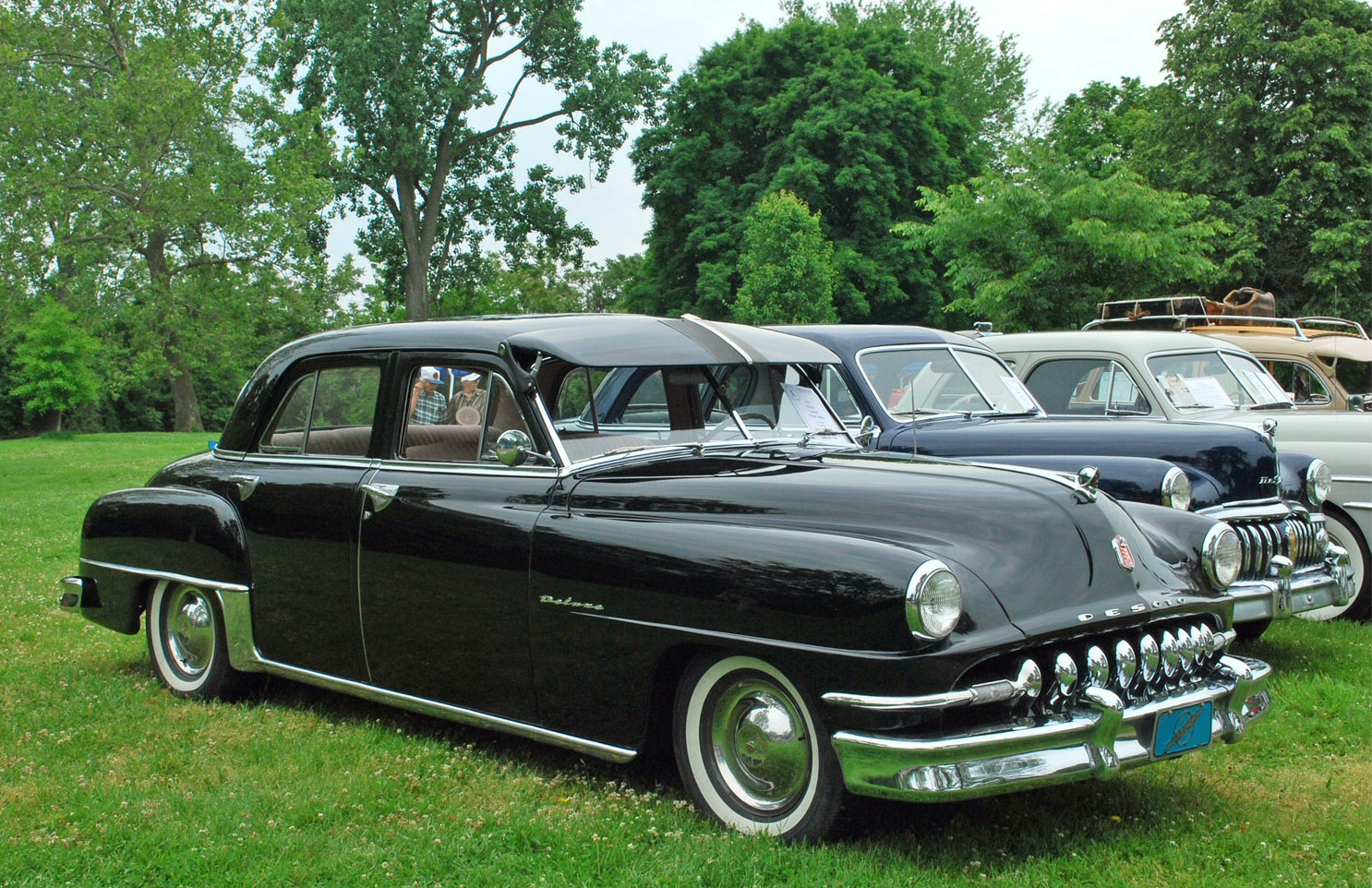

Overview
- Manufacturer: DeSoto (Chrysler)
- Also called: DeSoto Diplomat (export)
- Model years: 1942, 1946–1952
- Assembly: Lynch Road Assembly; Los Angeles (Maywood) Assembly; Wyoming Road Assembly

Body and chassis
- Class: Full-size
- Body style: 2-door coupe 4-door sedan 4-door station wagon
- Layout: FR layout
- Related: DeSoto Suburban; Dodge Deluxe; Dodge Wayfarer; Plymouth Deluxe; Chrysler Windsor; Dodge Custom; Dodge Coronet

Powertrain
- Engine: 236.7 cu in (3.9 L) Chrysler Straight-6 (1946),(1946–1950); 250.5 cu in (4.1 L) Chrysler Straight-6 (1951–1952)
- Transmission: 3-speed manual Gyro Fluid Drive

Dimensions
- Wheelbase: 121.5 in (3,086 mm)
- Length: 205.8 in (5,227 mm) (1949); 208.3 in (5,291 mm) (1951)
- Width: 73.2 in (1,859 mm)

Chronology
- Predecessor: DeSoto Six
- Successor: DeSoto Powermaster (straight six); DeSoto Firedome (V8)

The DeSoto Series S-10 is an automobile produced by DeSoto from 1942 through to the 1952 model year. While in production, the Series S-10, which was sold with the trim package DeLuxe, was DeSoto's entry-level car, and was offered primarily as two-door and four-door sedans while the Custom offered upscale interiors and appearance including a 7-passenger sedan and the extended-wheelbase Suburban sedans. The body was claimed to be "rust proofed".

The DeLuxe differed from the more upmarket Custom line by having less trim, fewer standard features, and plainer interiors in fewer color combinations. A six-tube and an eight-tube radio were optional.

The Deluxe shared its engine with the Custom, and was powered by Chrysler's L-head 237 cu in (3.88 L) six-cylinder engine, delivering 109 bhp (81 kW) at 3600 rpm. The DeSoto had full instrumentation.

Deluxes produced during the 1946, 1947, 1948 and first half of the 1949 model years used DeSoto's prewar bodies, slightly updated following the end of World War II. In 1948, low-pressure tires became standard equipment. Custom models, along with Deluxe models, produced during the 1946, 1947, 1948 and first half of the 1949 model years used DeSoto's prewar bodies. A fully redesigned Custom was launched in the second half of 1949, along with a redesigned Deluxe, and these cars are referred to as “1949 Second Series” models.

In 1950, the Custom gained DeSoto's first station wagon body style, which was not offered as a Deluxe and gave the choice of optional wooden panels bonded to the exterior steel body. The Custom also received DeSoto's first hardtop coupe, which featured pillarless door design and offered interior equipment and refinement from the convertible, and again, the Deluxe was excluded from the premium body style. Standard equipment included two-speed electric windshield wipers, a trunk light and full carpeting. In 1951, the brakes grew to 12 inches in diameter.

The Deluxe remained DeSoto's base model until it was replaced by the DeSoto Powermaster in 1953, while Customs were unseated as DeSoto's premium model range with the introduction of the V8-powered 1952 Firedome model range of cars.

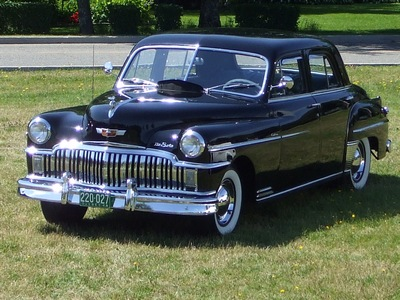
1949 DeSoto Deluxe Four-Door Sedan

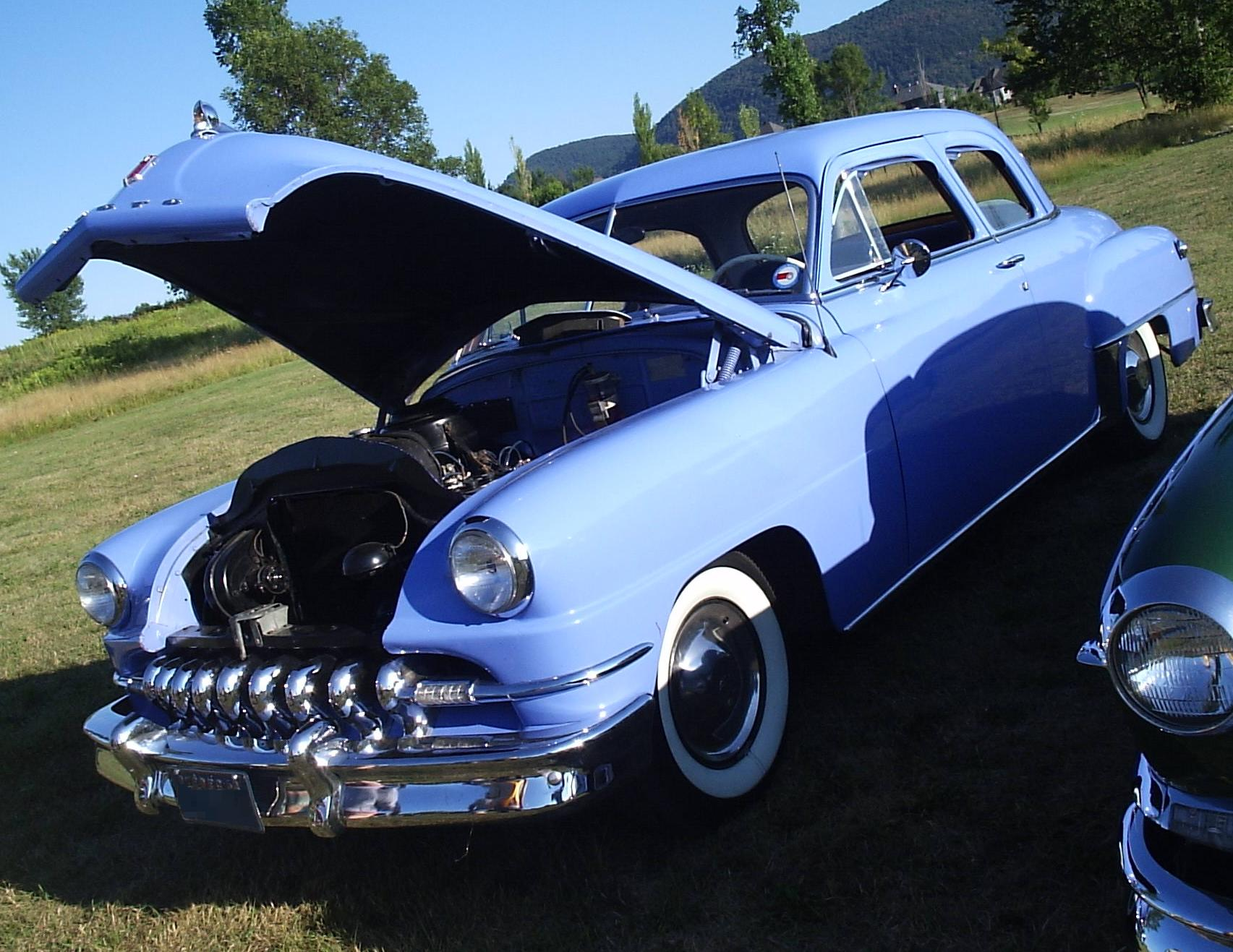
1952 DeSoto Deluxe Club Coupe
