= DeSoto (automobile) =

Former American automobile brand

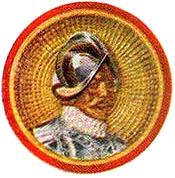
- Product type: Automobile, trucks
- Produced by: Chrysler Corporation
- Introduced: 1928 by Walter Chrysler
- Discontinued: 1961; 65 years ago
- Related brands: Plymouth
- Markets: North America
- Previous owners: Chrysler Corporation
- Ambassadors: Walter Chrysler (founder); J.E. Fields (first president of DeSoto division)

DeSoto (sometimes De Soto) was an American automobile brand that was manufactured and marketed by the DeSoto division of Chrysler Corporation from 1928 to the 1961 model year. More than two million passenger cars and trucks bore the DeSoto brand in North American markets during its existence.

== History ==
=== Predecessors ===
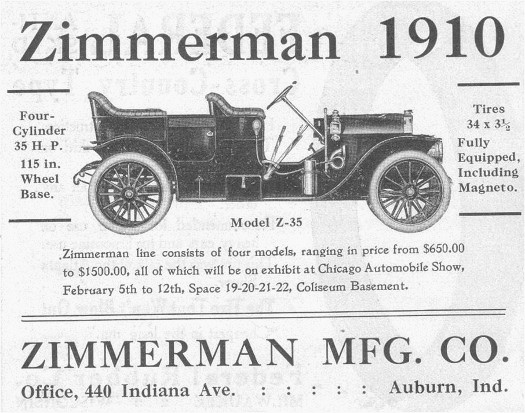
1910 Zimmerman Model Z-35 touring sedan

The De Soto Motor Car Company was formed in Auburn, Indiana, in November 1912, by L.M. Field, Hayes Fry and Glenn Fry of Iowa City, Iowa, and V.H. Van Sickle and H.J. Clark of Des Moines, Iowa. It was a subsidiary of the Zimmerman Manufacturing Company of Auburn, which had been founded in 1886 as a manufacturer of horse buggies. It entered automobile production in 1908 with a line of high wheel automobiles and from 1912 to 1916 with light high wheel trucks, but switched to conventional cars and trucks around the time it was bought by the Auburn Automobile Company. Advertisements listed the 1910 Zimmerman Z-35 at $650 to $1,500 ($22,460 to $51,830 in 2025 dollars).

The De Soto Company was started with $20,000 ($651,515 in 2025 dollars) and produced two models. The De Soto Six was a rebadged version of the Zimmerman and was listed at $2,185 ($71,178 in 2025 dollars) which was more expensive than the Zimmerman on which it was based. It offered electric lights and a compressed air engine starter, which a customer could decline for a credit of $100 ($3,258 in 2025 dollars). In 1914, the De Soto Six was joined by a two-cylinder, two-passenger, inline-seating cyclecar, which listed at $385 ($12,375 in 2025 dollars). There were plans to move manufacturing to Fort Wayne in 1915 and rename the company as Motorette, but when there were deaths in the Zimmerman family the company was bought by Auburn Automobile Company.

=== 1929–1942 ===
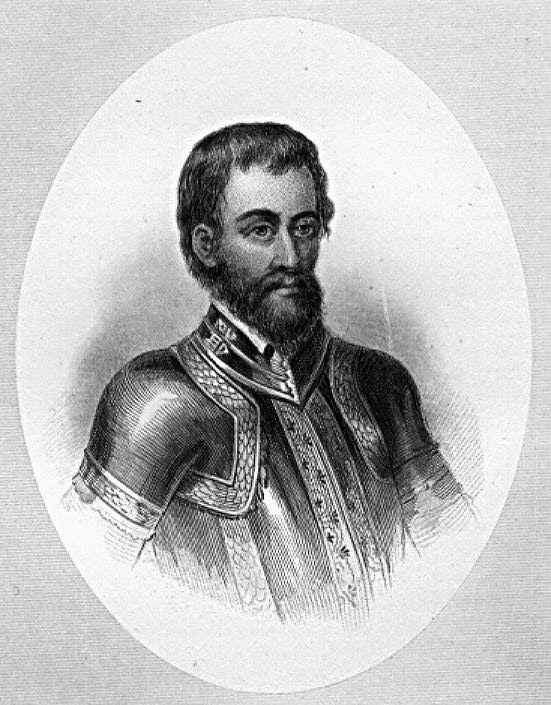
The brand was named after Spanish conquistador Hernando de Soto

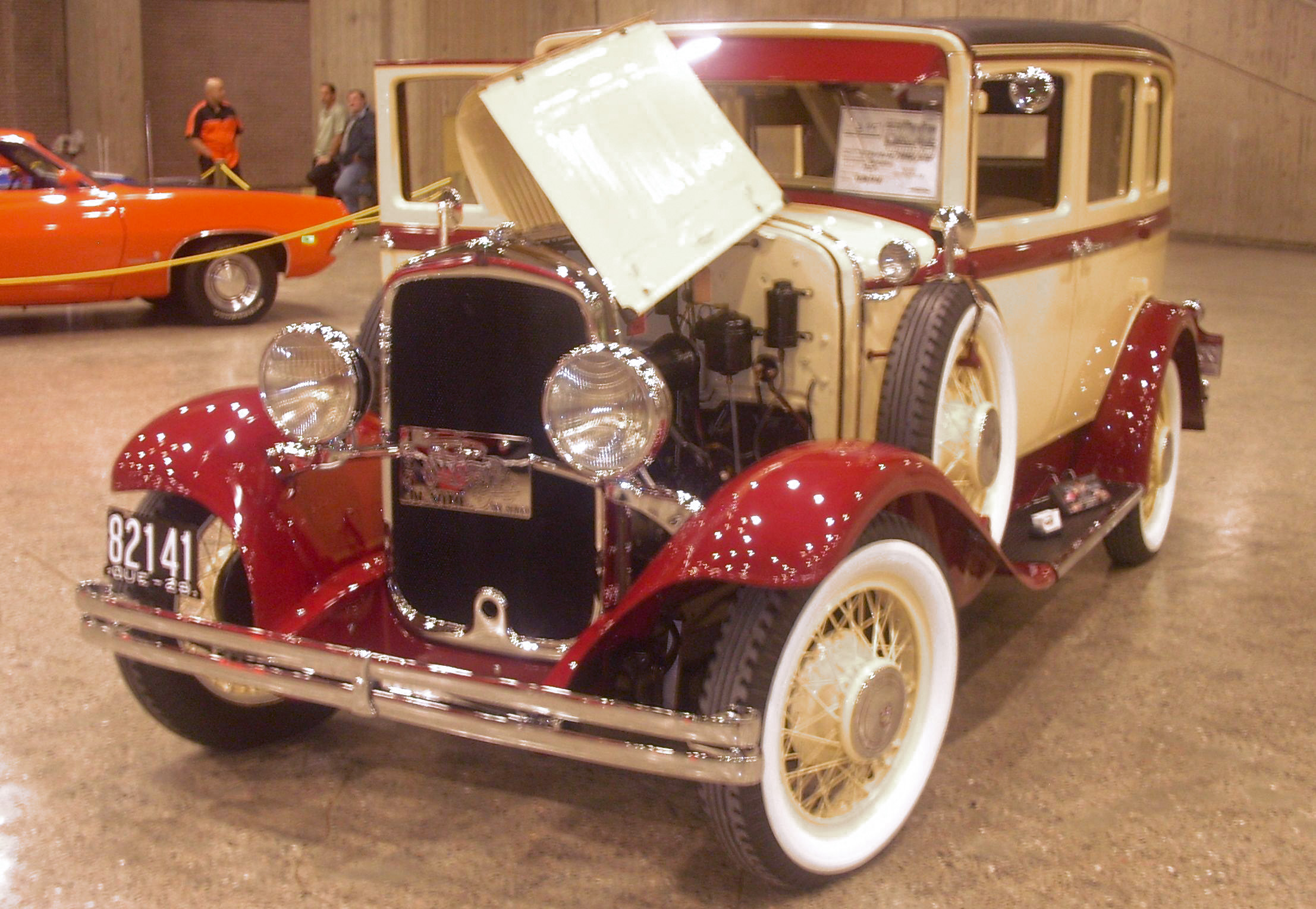
The DeSoto Six Series K, introduced for the 1929 model year

The DeSoto marque was founded by Walter Chrysler on August 4, 1928, to compete with Pontiac, Studebaker, Hudson and Willys in the mid-price class. Introduced for the 1929 model year, DeSoto served as a lower-priced version of Chrysler products, with Dodge positioned above DeSoto, while Plymouth was added as the entry-level product of the Chrysler hierarchy in 1928.

The marque was named after the Spanish explorer Hernando de Soto, who led the first European expedition deep into the territory of the modern-day United States (Florida, Georgia, Alabama, and Mississippi) and was the first documented European to have crossed the Mississippi River. The DeSoto logo featured a stylized image of the explorer.

In 1929 a total of 81,065 single-model DeSoto Sixes were produced, a first-year production record in the U.S. that stood for 31 years until eclipsed by the 1960 Ford Falcon. However, shortly after the DeSoto was introduced, Chrysler completed its purchase of Dodge Brothers, giving the company two mid-priced makes. Initially, the two-make strategy was relatively successful, as Chrysler was hoping to benefit from the market reputation Dodge had when it was run by Horace Elgin Dodge and John Francis Dodge, with DeSoto priced below Dodge models. Despite the economic times, DeSoto sales were relatively healthy, equaling Dodge at around 25,000 units in 1932.

In 1933, Chrysler reversed the market positions of the two marques in hopes of boosting Dodge sales, ranking DeSoto above Dodge. As a result, the DeSoto received Chrysler's streamlined 1934 Airflow bodies, but on a shorter wheelbase; the design proved unpopular with consumers. Unlike Chrysler, which still had more traditional models on which to fall back, DeSoto was hobbled by the Airflow design until its 1935 Airstream arrived.

Aside from its Airflow models, DeSoto's 1942 model is probably its second-most memorable model from its early years, when the cars were fitted with powered pop-up headlights, a first for a North American mass-production vehicle. (The Cord 810 introduced dashboard hand-cranked hidden headlamps in the 1936 model year.) DeSoto marketed the feature as "Air-Foil" lights ("Out of Sight Except at Night").

==== 1929–1942 gallery ====
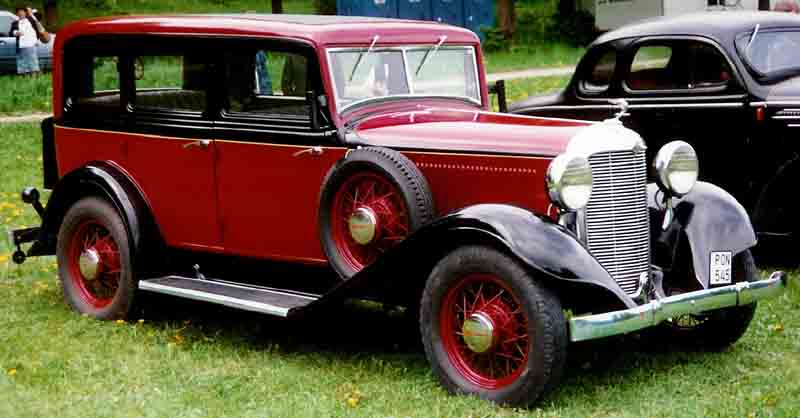
1932 DeSoto Six Series SC 4-Door Sedan

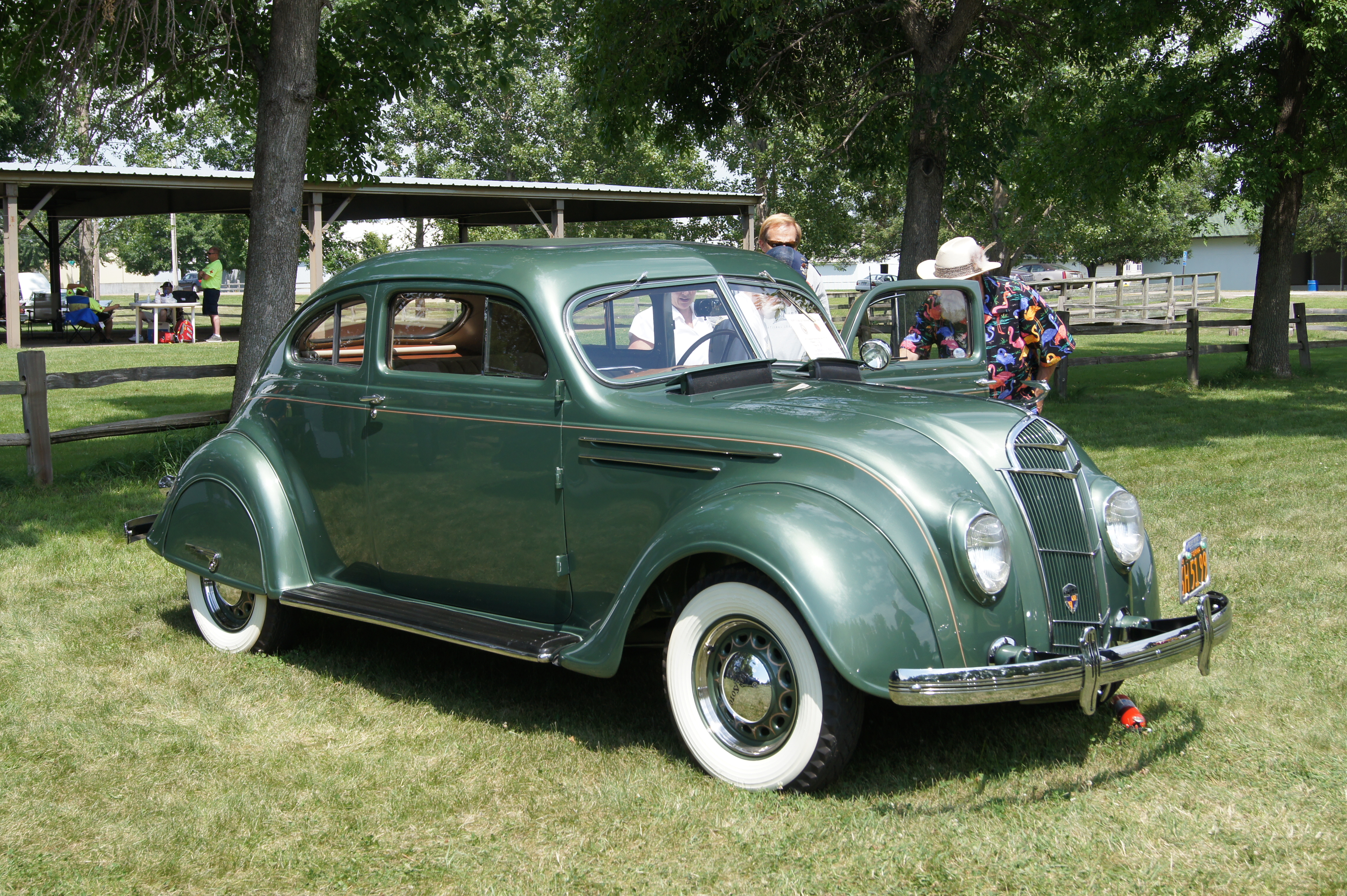
1935 DeSoto Airflow Series SG Business Coupe

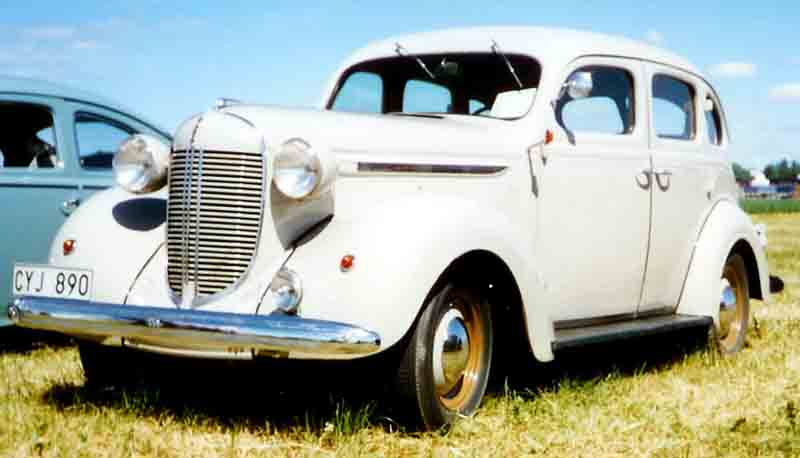
1937 DeSoto Six Series S-3 4-Door Sedan

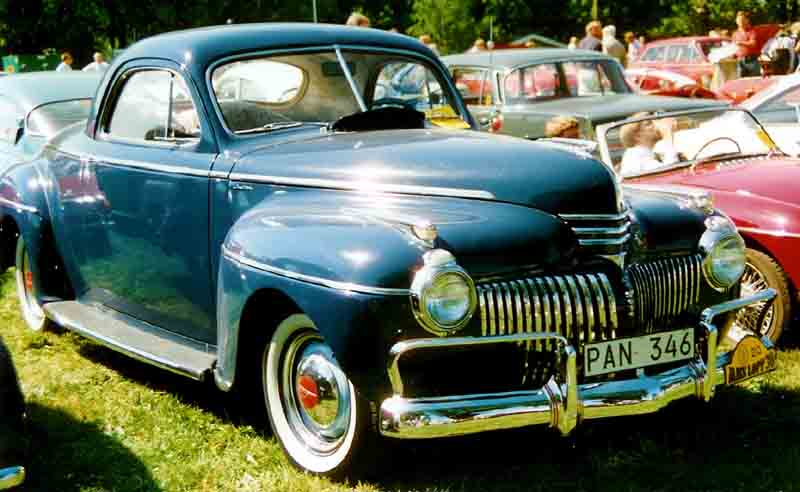
1941 DeSoto Six Series S-8 Custom Coupé

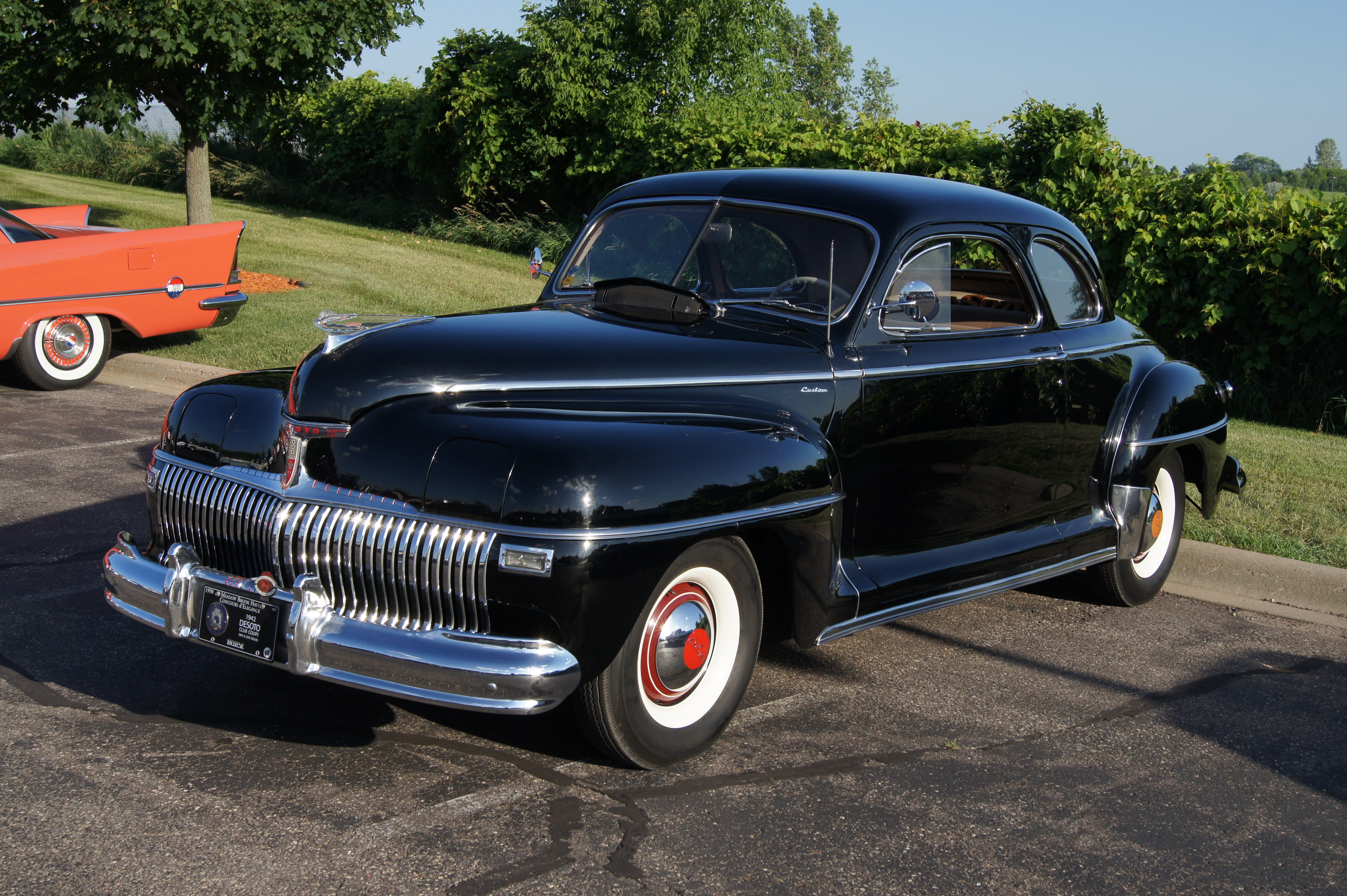
1942 DeSoto Custom Club Coupe

=== 1946–1960 ===
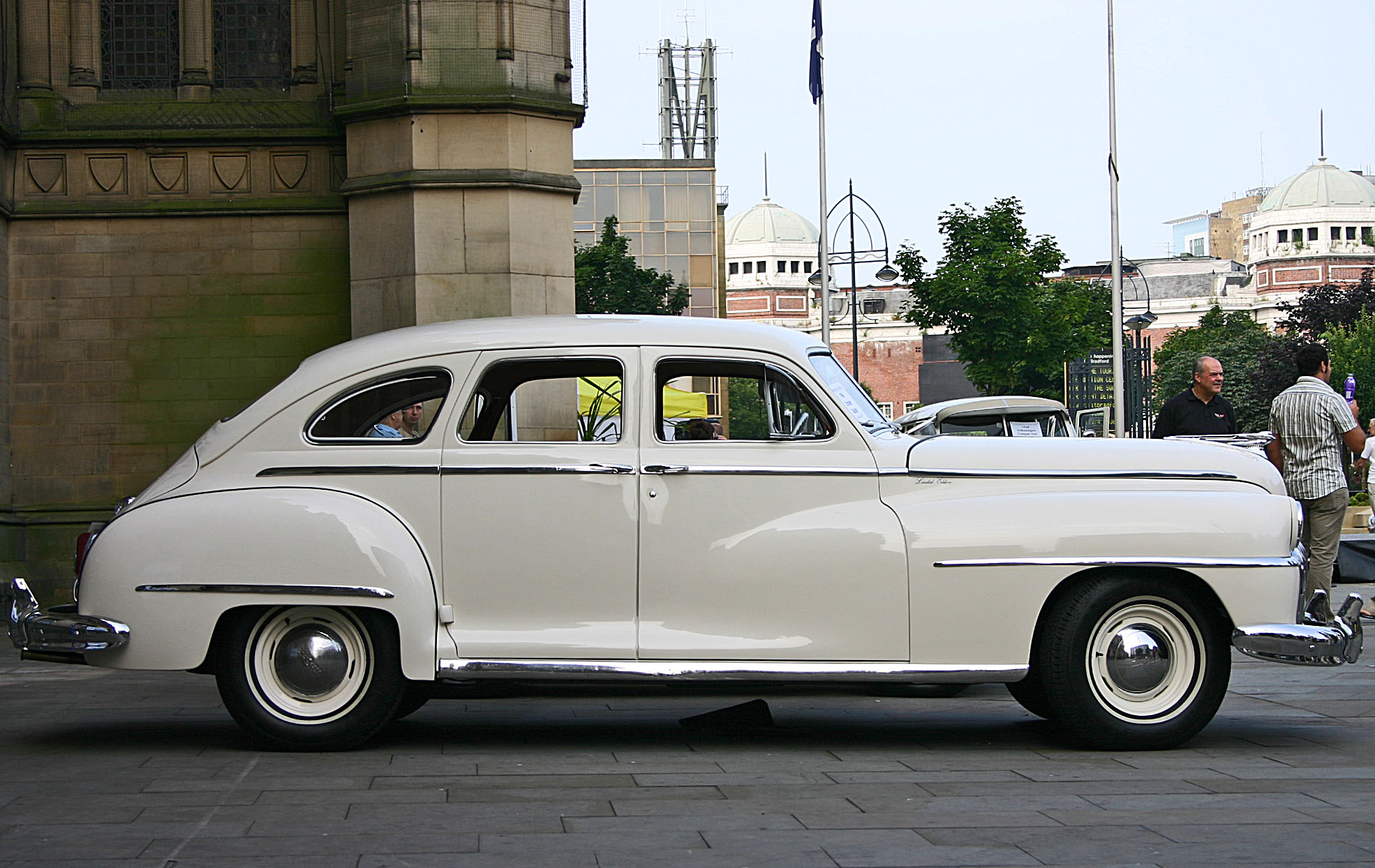
1946 DeSoto four-door

After wartime restrictions on automotive production were ended, DeSoto returned to civilian car production when it reissued its 1942 models as 1946 models, but without the hidden-headlight feature, and with fender contours extending into the doors, like other Chrysler products of the immediate postwar period.

Until 1952, DeSoto used the Deluxe and Custom model designations. In 1952, DeSoto added the Firedome with its 276-cid V-8 Hemi engine. However, in 1953, DeSoto dropped the Deluxe and Custom names and designated its six-cylinder cars the Powermaster and its V-8 car remained the Firedome. Initially, the 276 cu in (4.5 L) DeSoto "Fire Dome" Hemi engine was installed in the French luxury performance Facel Vega.

At its height, DeSoto's more popular models included the Firesweep, Firedome and Fireflite. The DeSoto Adventurer, introduced for 1956 as a top of the line high-performance hard-top coupe (and convertible beginning in 1957, similar to Chrysler's 300), became a full-range model in 1960.

In 1955, along with all Chrysler models, DeSotos were redesigned with Virgil Exner's "Forward Look." DeSotos sold well through the 1956 model year. That year, for the first and only time in the marque's history, it served as pace car at the Indianapolis 500. For the 1956 update, Exner gave the DeSoto soaring tailfins fitted with triple taillights, and consumers responded by buying in record numbers.

The 1957 had a well-integrated design, with two variations: the smaller Firesweep body placed on the concurrent Dodge 122-inch wheelbase chassis with Dodge front fenders and the Firedome and Fireflite (and its halo model Adventurer sub-series), based on the larger 126-inch wheelbase chassis shared with Chrysler. As was conventional in the era, subsequent years within the typical three-year model block were distinguished by trim, bumper and other low-cost modifications, typically by adding bulk to bumpers and grilles, taillight changes, color choices, instrumentation and interior design changes and often additional external trim.

The 1958 economic downturn hurt sales of mid-priced makes across the board, and DeSoto sales were 60% lower than those of 1957 in what would be DeSoto's worst year since 1938. Also, Ford Motor Company had introduced new mid-price competitors for the 1958 model year with the Edsel brand. The sales slide continued for 1959 and 1960 (down 40% from the already-low 1959 figures), and rumors began to circulate that DeSoto was soon to be discontinued. 1960 was the last year of DeSoto sales in Canada.

==== 1946–1960 gallery ====
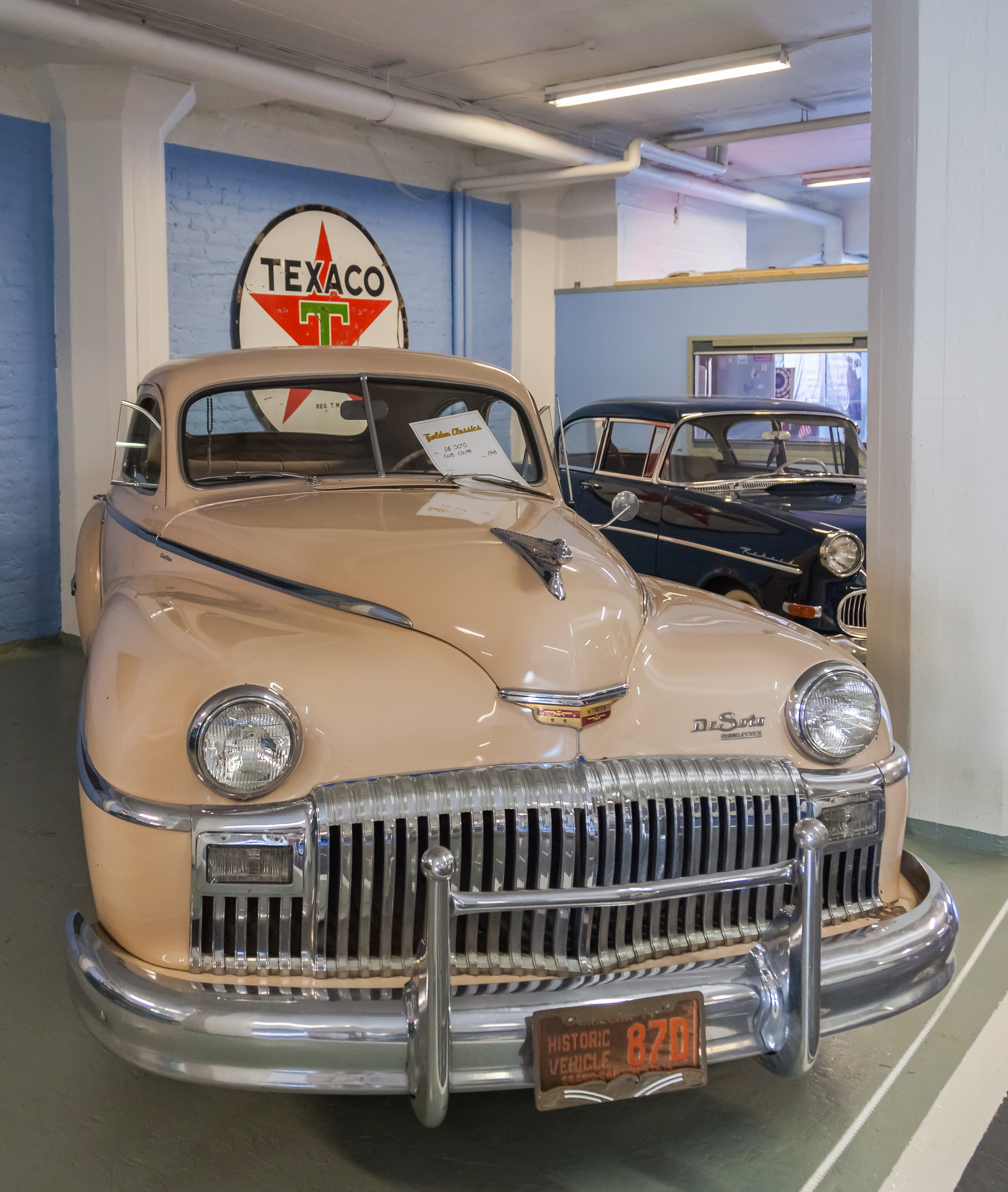
1948 DeSoto Club Coupe

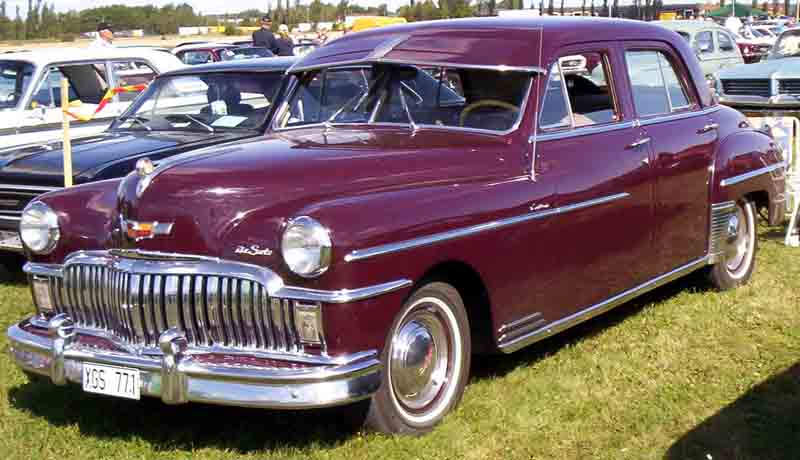
1949 DeSoto Custom 4-door sedan

DeSoto Custom in Switzerland

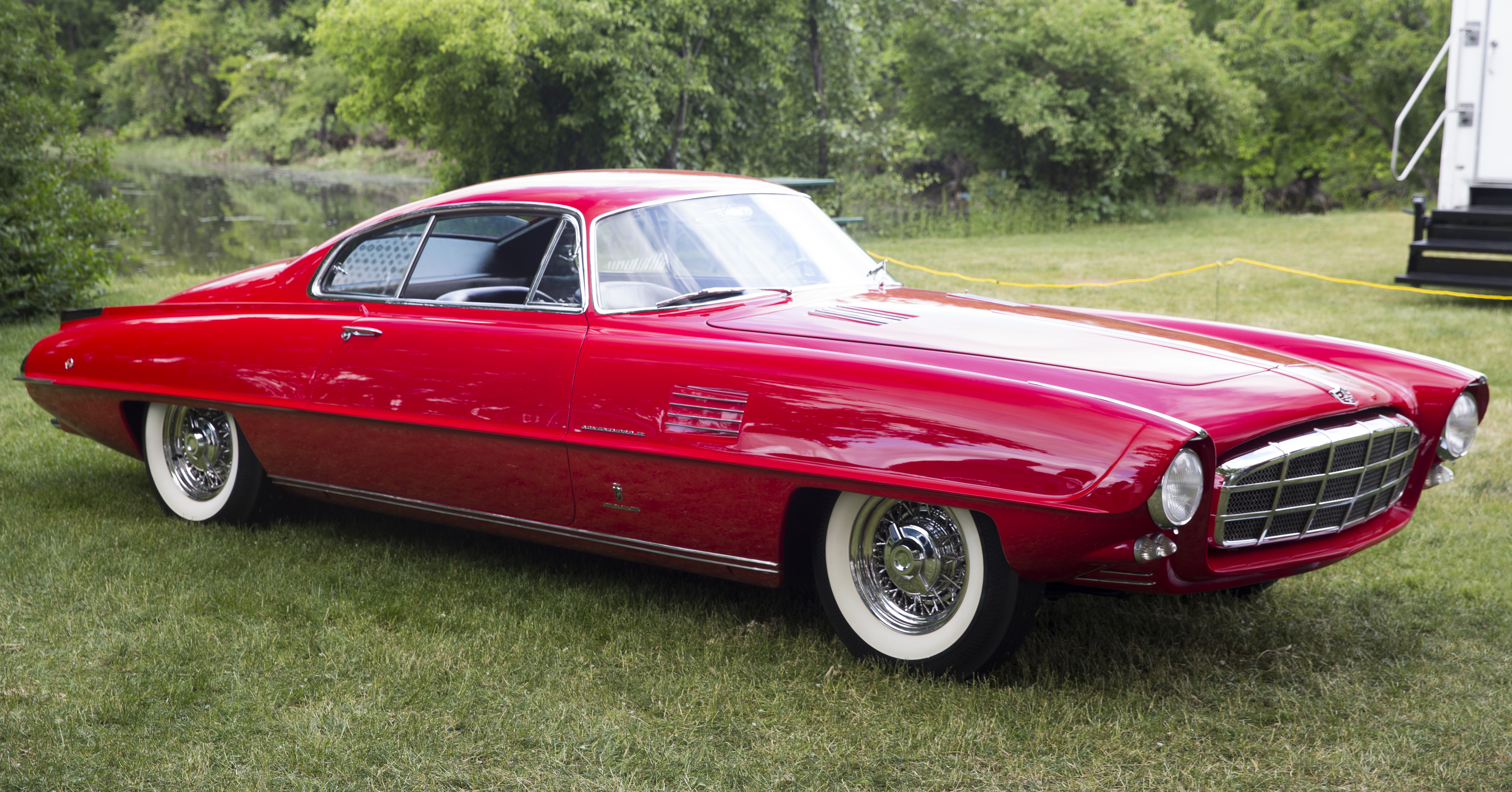
The 1954 DeSoto Adventurer II show car, bodied by Ghia

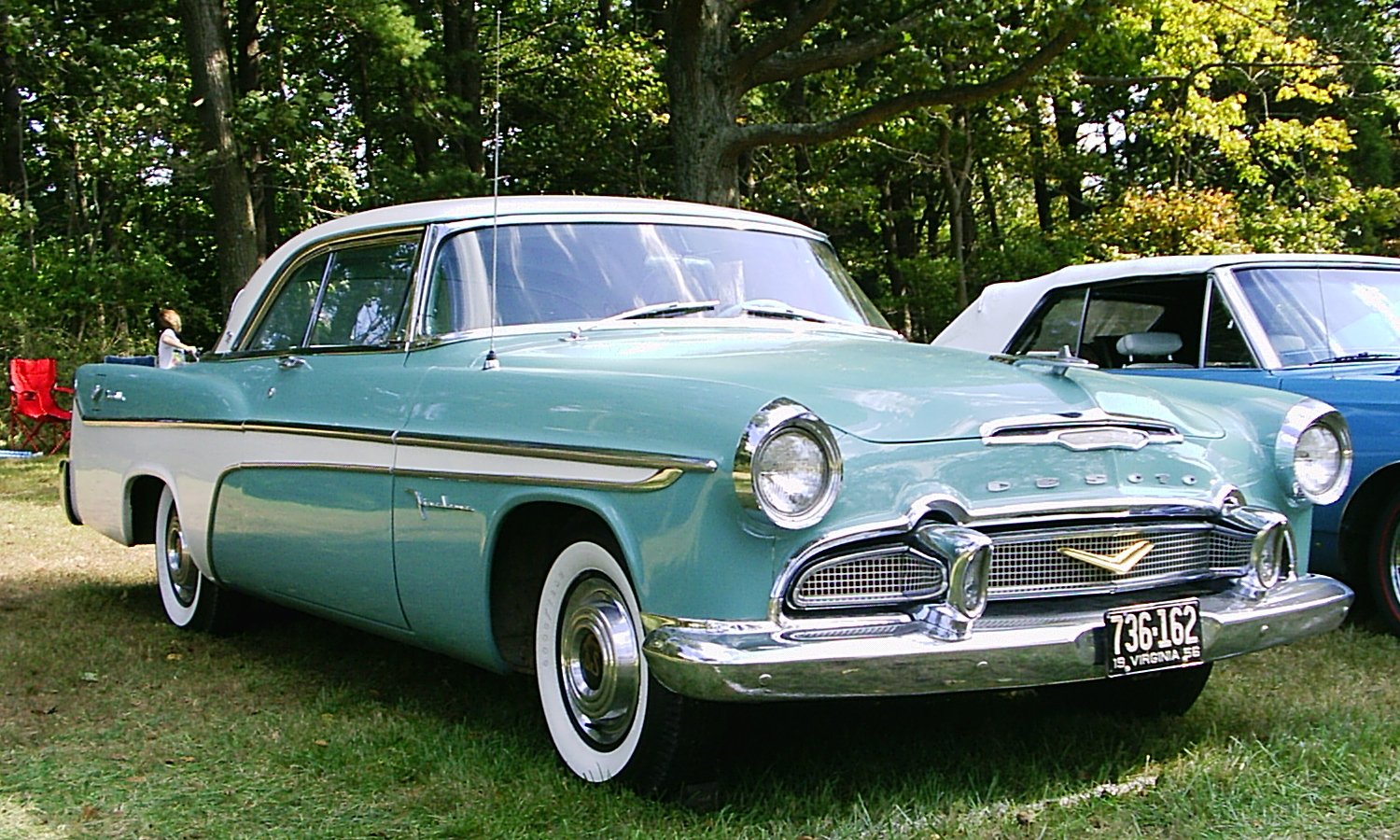
1956 DeSoto Firedome 2-door hardtop

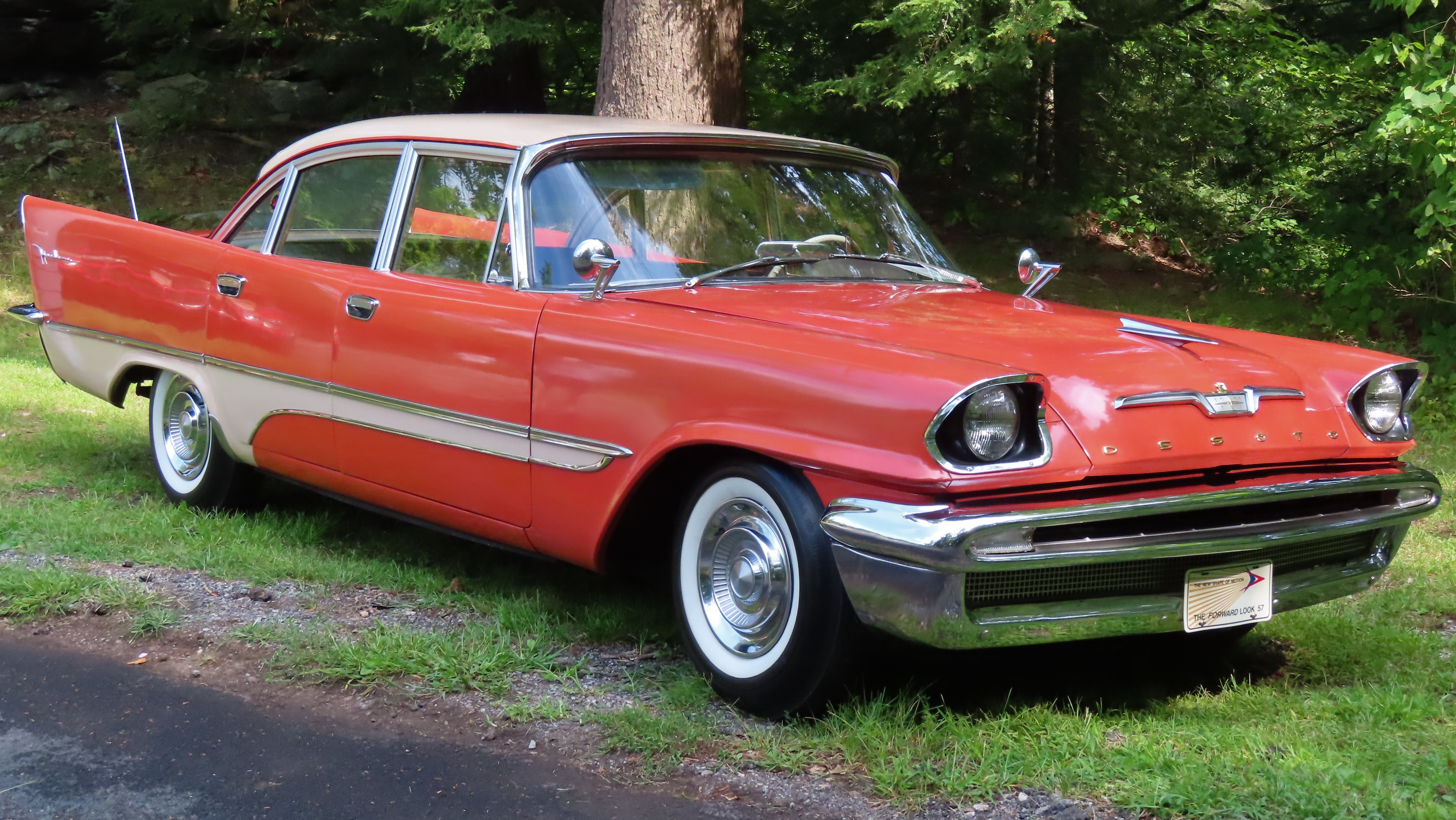
1957 DeSoto Firedome 4 Door Sedan

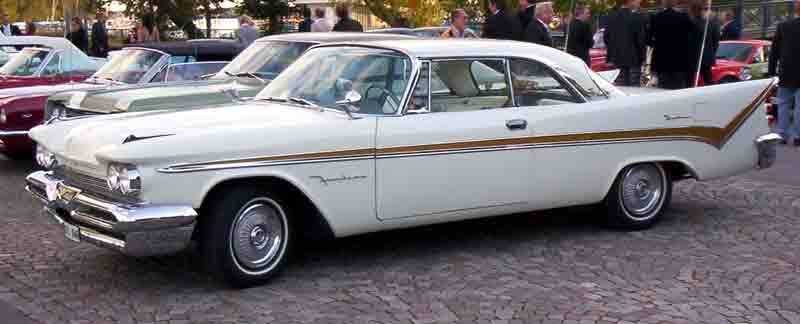
1959 DeSoto Firedome 2-Door Sportsman

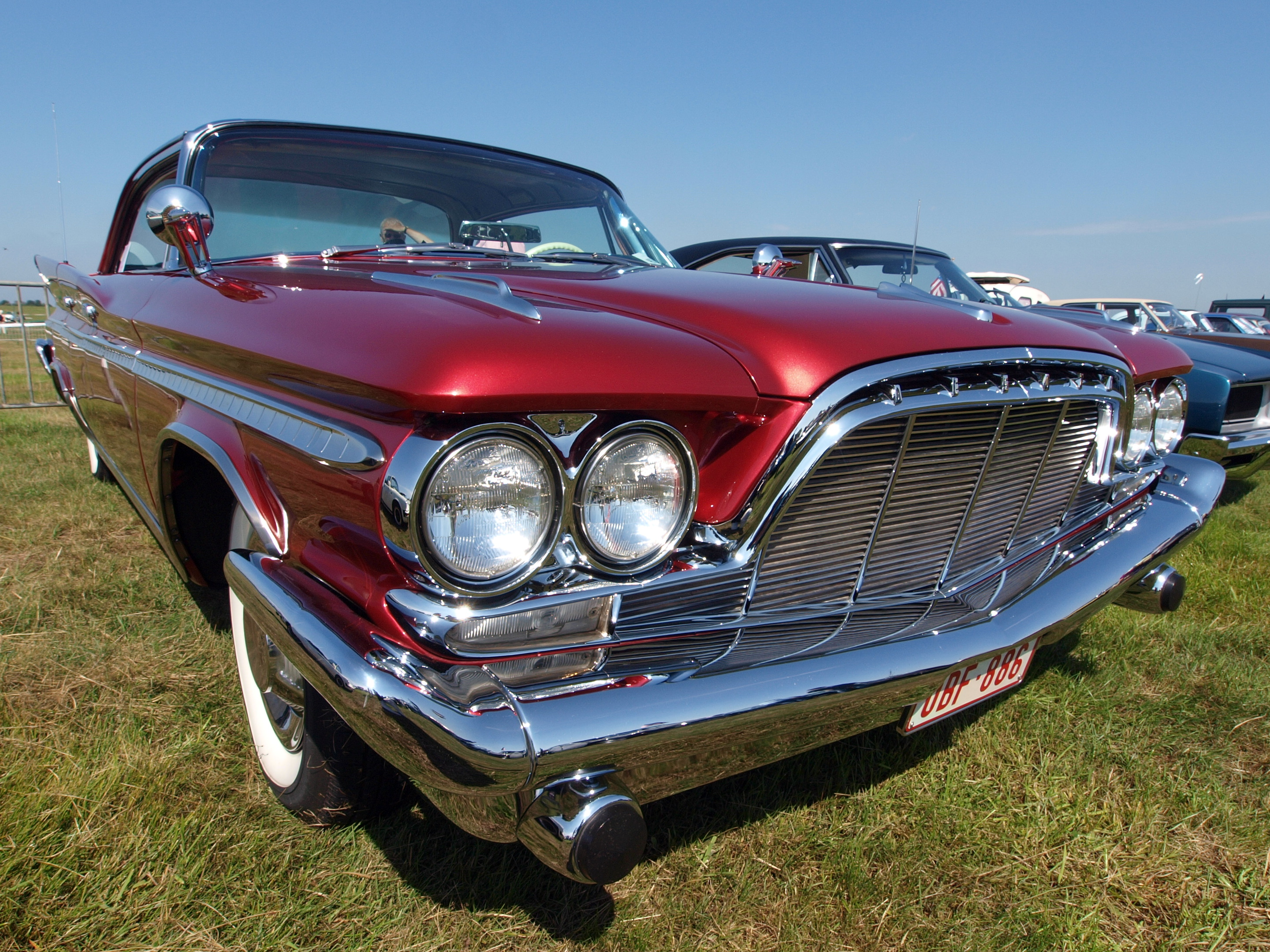
1960 DeSoto Adventurer

=== 1961 ===
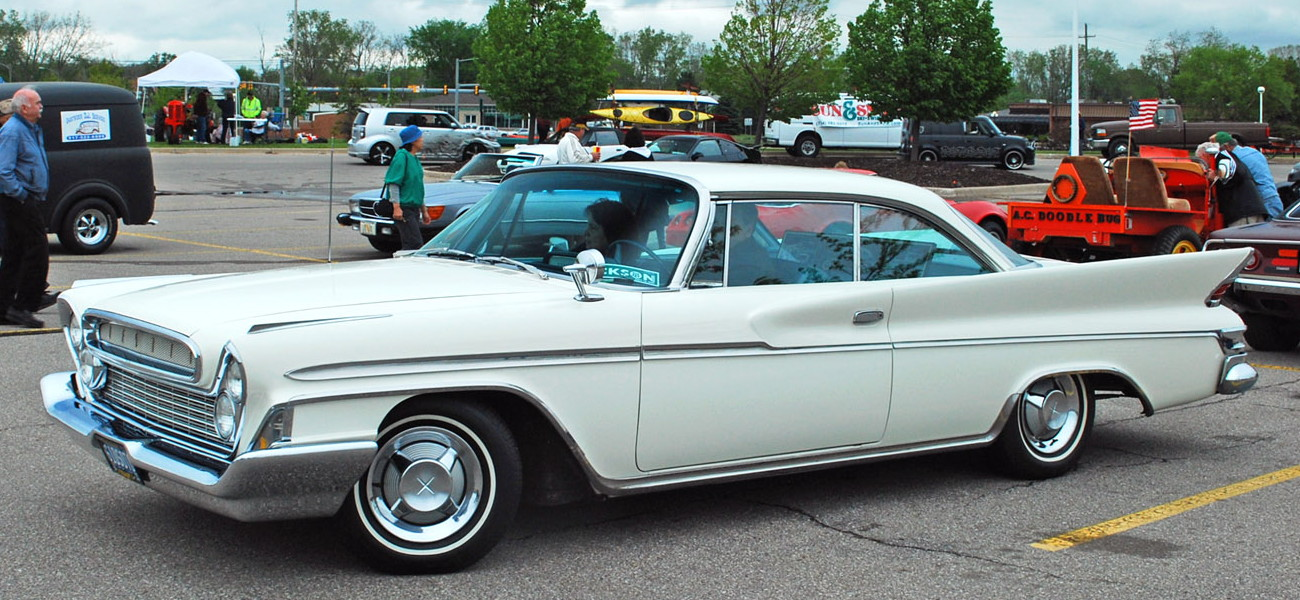
1961 DeSoto Fireflite. Despite its model year, this vehicle was assembled in 1960.

By the time the 1961 DeSoto was introduced in the fall of 1960, rumors were widespread that Chrysler was moving toward terminating the brand, fueled by a reduction in model offerings for the 1960 model year. The introduction of the lower-priced Newport to the upscale Chrysler brand no doubt hastened the decision to end production of the DeSoto, which was very similar in size, styling, price and standard features.

For 1961, DeSoto lost its series designations entirely, in a move reminiscent of Packard's final lineup. And, as with the final Packards, the final DeSoto was of questionable design merit. Again based on the shorter Chrysler Windsor wheelbase, the DeSoto featured a two-tiered grille (each tier with a different texture) and revised taillights. Only a two-door hardtop and a four-door hardtop were offered. The cars were trimmed similarly to the 1960 Fireflite.

The final decision to discontinue DeSoto was announced on November 18, 1960, just 47 days after the 1961 models were introduced. At the time, Chrysler warehouses contained several million dollars in 1961 DeSoto parts, so the company ramped up production in order to use up the stock. The last DeSoto rolled off the line on November 30. Chrysler and Plymouth dealers, which had been forced to take possession of DeSotos under the terms of their franchise agreements, received no compensation from Chrysler for their unsold DeSotos at the time of the formal announcement. Making matters worse, Chrysler continued to ship the cars through December, many of which were sold at a loss by dealers eager to be rid of them. After the parts stock was exhausted, a few outstanding customer orders were filled with Chrysler Windsors.

== Termination factors ==
Despite being a successful mid-priced line for Chrysler Corporation for most of its life, DeSoto's failure was attributable to a combination of corporate mistakes and external factors beyond Chrysler's control. The market segment DeSoto was positioned in was already filled with brands made by rivals Ford and General Motors. Compounding this, in 1961 Chrysler brought out its new entry-level Newport model – an upper-tier DeSoto competitor – at the same time it discontinued those models. By 1961 the DeSoto brand had been pushed to the brink.

=== Recession ===
The 1958 recession seriously affected demand for mid-priced automobile makes. DeSoto sales were particularly affected, and sales failed to recover in 1959 and 1960. With falling sales, the 1959 and 1960 models were very similar to the concurrent Chryslers. Moreover, rumors that DeSoto would soon be discontinued did not help sales.

=== Dealer networks ===
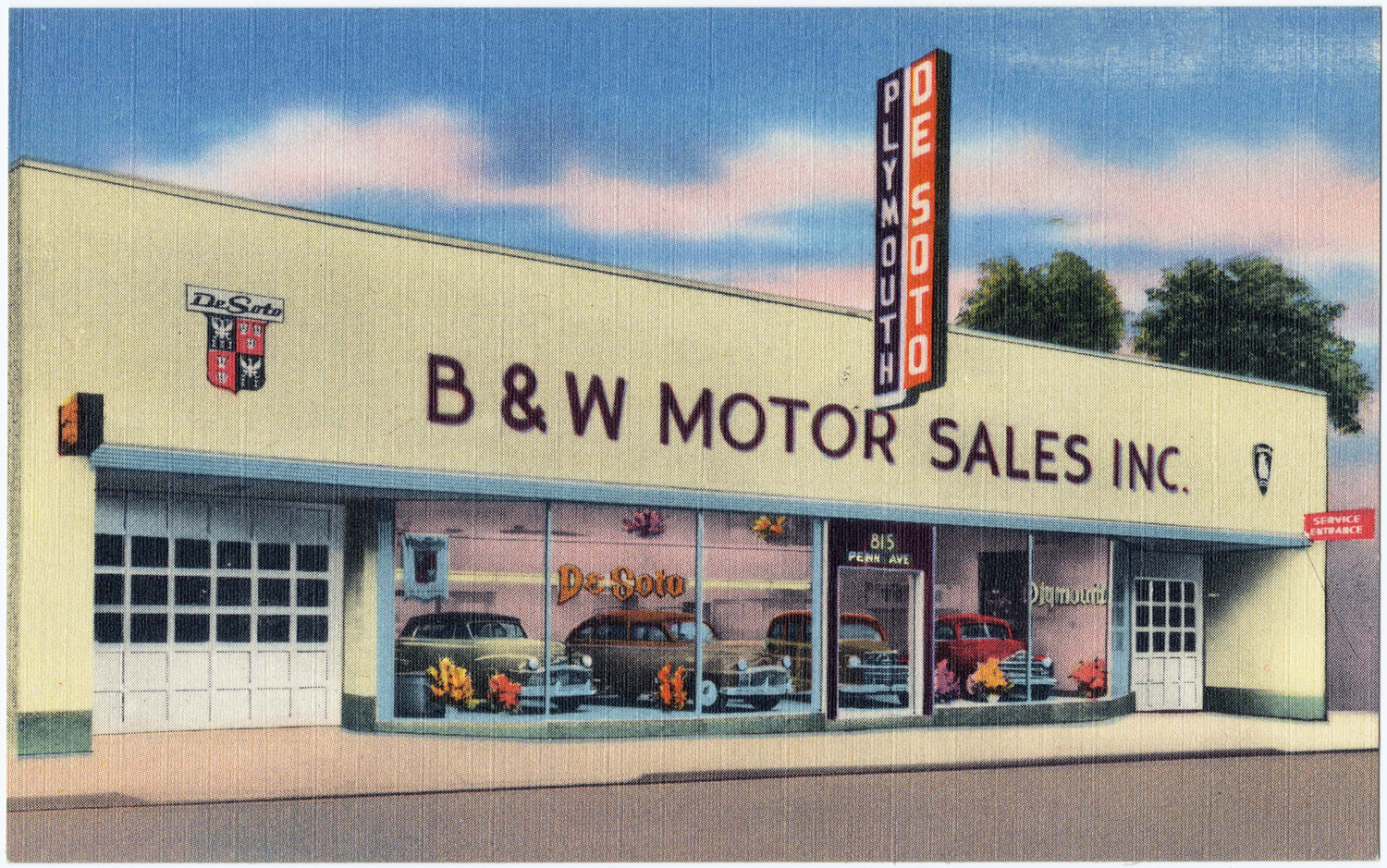
DeSoto-Plymouth dealer on 815 Penn Avenue, Wilkinsburg, Pennsylvania, c. 1945

Chrysler's dealer network also had an effect on the termination of the DeSoto brand. Following World War II, Chrysler had a large number of dealers that carried two or more Chrysler makes, with DeSoto-Plymouth and Chrysler–Plymouth relationships being the most common. However, as Chrysler attempted to spin Plymouth off into standalone dealerships, existing dealers typically chose to become higher-volume Plymouth dealerships rather than taking on the slower-selling DeSoto brand, leaving the marque with a weakened dealer network and fewer outlets selling its cars. DeSoto's failure to adjust to changing market trends, evidenced by its lack of a new compact car model in 1960 as GM, Ford and DeSoto's siblings Dodge and Plymouth had done, also hastened its demise.

=== Brand management and marketing ===
Chrysler's brand management during the 1950s pitted each of its five marques (Plymouth, Dodge, DeSoto, Chrysler and Imperial) against one another, causing the greatest damage to DeSoto. Rather than managing the market relationship to specific price points for particular consumers, as General Motors had done successfully, Chrysler allowed its divisions to develop products targeting markets covered by their own sister divisions. Dodge was most successful when it introduced the lower-priced Dodge Dart in 1960. The Dart was advertised in comparison to the "C" car, the "F" car and the "P" car (Chevrolet, Ford, and Plymouth, respectively). While sales of the Dart increased in 1960, they did so at the expense of Plymouth. Traditionally one of the three lower-priced brands, Plymouth fell out of third place, to regain it only twice (1971 and 1974) before its own demise in 2001.

Dodge moved upmarket with the Custom Royal in the mid-1950s, which cut into and eroded DeSoto's traditional market segment. The introduction of the 1957 DeSoto Firesweep, a model that used the Dodge engine, chassis, front fenders and hood, pushed DeSoto into direct competition with the Custom Royal. The Firesweep sold well, but at the expense of the higher-priced Firedome and Fireflite models. In an era of strong make identification, when DeSoto began to lose any distinctive styling, trouble lay ahead.

Compounding this, when Chrysler marketing showed that consumers were likelier to buy an entry-level Chrysler than a DeSoto, Chrysler introduced the Newport as a 1961 model, selling more than 45,000 units in its first year. At less than $3,000, the Newport covered the same price range as the 1961 DeSoto, which had sold 3,034 units total. Thus the DeSoto was dropped and replaced by the Newport. In 1962, Dodge also introduced its own DeSoto replacement, the large DeSoto-sized Dodge Custom 880. With the introduction of the Newport and the Custom 880, the price gap caused by the demise of DeSoto was effectively closed.

Going in the opposite direction, Chrysler pushed into the luxury market by marketing the luxury Imperial as a separate make and division starting in 1955. To make room for the new make, Chrysler began expanding downward, while Dodge began expanding upward, with larger and more luxurious models. Both Chrysler and Dodge began eating into DeSoto's already small market, and Chrysler's upper management did nothing to stop them.

== Leadership ==
- J.E. Fields (1929–1931)
- Byron C. Foy (1931–1946)
- C.E. Bleicher (1947–1950)
- L.I. Woolson (1954–1955)

== Trucks ==
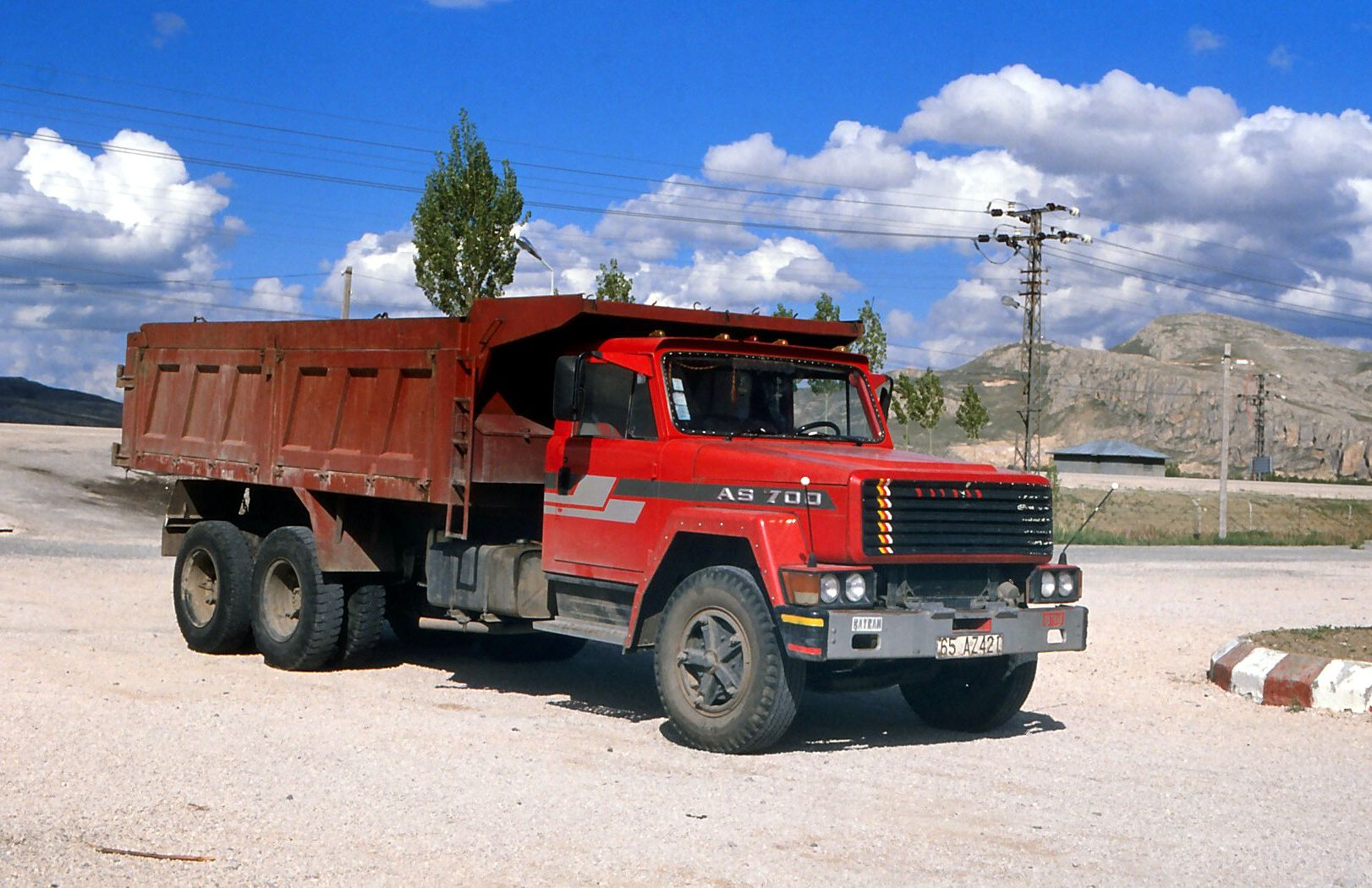
Although it was discontinued, the DeSoto brand continued to be used on Turkish Askam trucks, such as this AS700 model.

Chrysler Corporation introduced the DeSoto brand of trucks in 1937 to provide a greater number of sales outlets overseas for the American-built Dodge and Fargo commercial vehicles. The DeSoto brand was badge-engineered sporadically on Dodge trucks made in Argentina by its Chrysler local subsidiary (for the D-100 and the D-400 since 1960 to 1965), Australia, Spain, Turkey and the United Kingdom.

Chrysler ended its truck operations in international markets in 1970. However, both the DeSoto and Fargo brands continued to be used on trucks made by Askam in Turkey. In 1978, Chrysler sold its share in the Askam venture to its Turkish partners.

== Models ==
- K-SA series (1929–1932)
- Six (1929–1942)
- SC-SD series (1933–1934)
- Airflow (1934–1936)
- Airstream (1935–1936)
- S-10 series (1937–1942) (Note: S-1 through S-10, except the Airstream and Airflow.)
- Custom (1946–1952)
- Deluxe (1946–1952)
- Suburban (1946–1954)
- Firedome (1952–1959)
- Powermaster (1953–1954)
- Fireflite (1955–1960)
- Adventurer (1956–1960)
- Pacesetter (1956–1961)
- Firesweep (1957–1959)
- Rebel (1961–1963) (South Africa)
- Coupe Utility (car/truck) (Australia)
- Diplomat (Export)
- Truck (Note: Rebadged Dodge when the DeSoto brand was discontinued.) (Argentina, Australia)

== Advertising ==
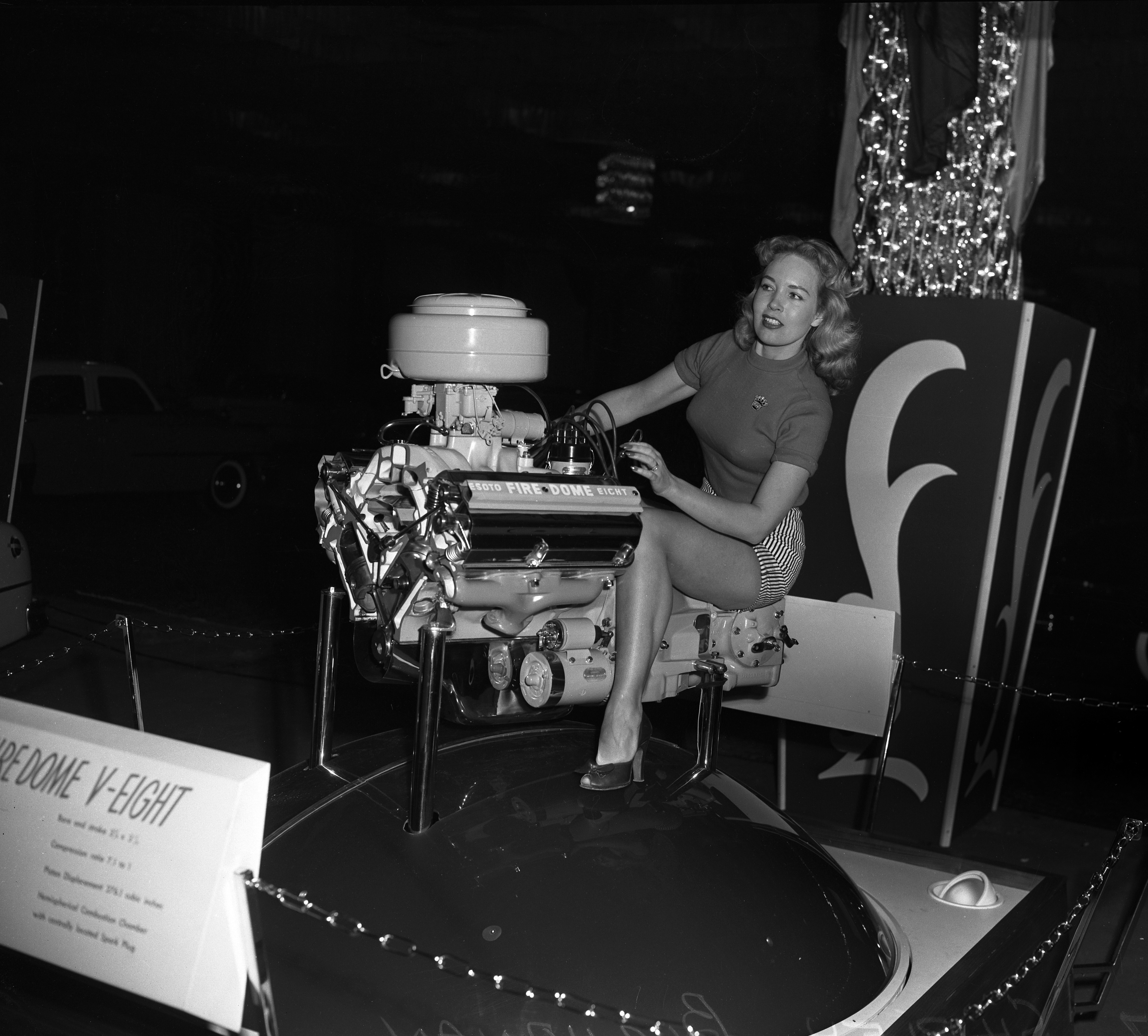
DeSoto Fire Dome V8 engine at the 1952 Los Angeles International Automobile Show

DeSoto sponsored the popular television game show You Bet Your Life from 1950 through 1958, in which host Groucho Marx promoted the product by urging viewers to visit a DeSoto dealer with the phrases "Tell 'em Groucho sent you" and "Drive a DeSoto before you decide." A DeSoto logo was visible in the background during the show.

The Cole Porter song "It's De-Lovely" was used, with Porter's permission, in DeSoto advertising between 1955 and 1957. The song lyrics were revised to "It's delovely, it's dynamic, it's DeSoto."

== Motorsport ==
DeSotos were used in NASCAR's Grand National series in the 1950s.

== See also ==
- Fargo Trucks
