= DeSoto Powermaster =

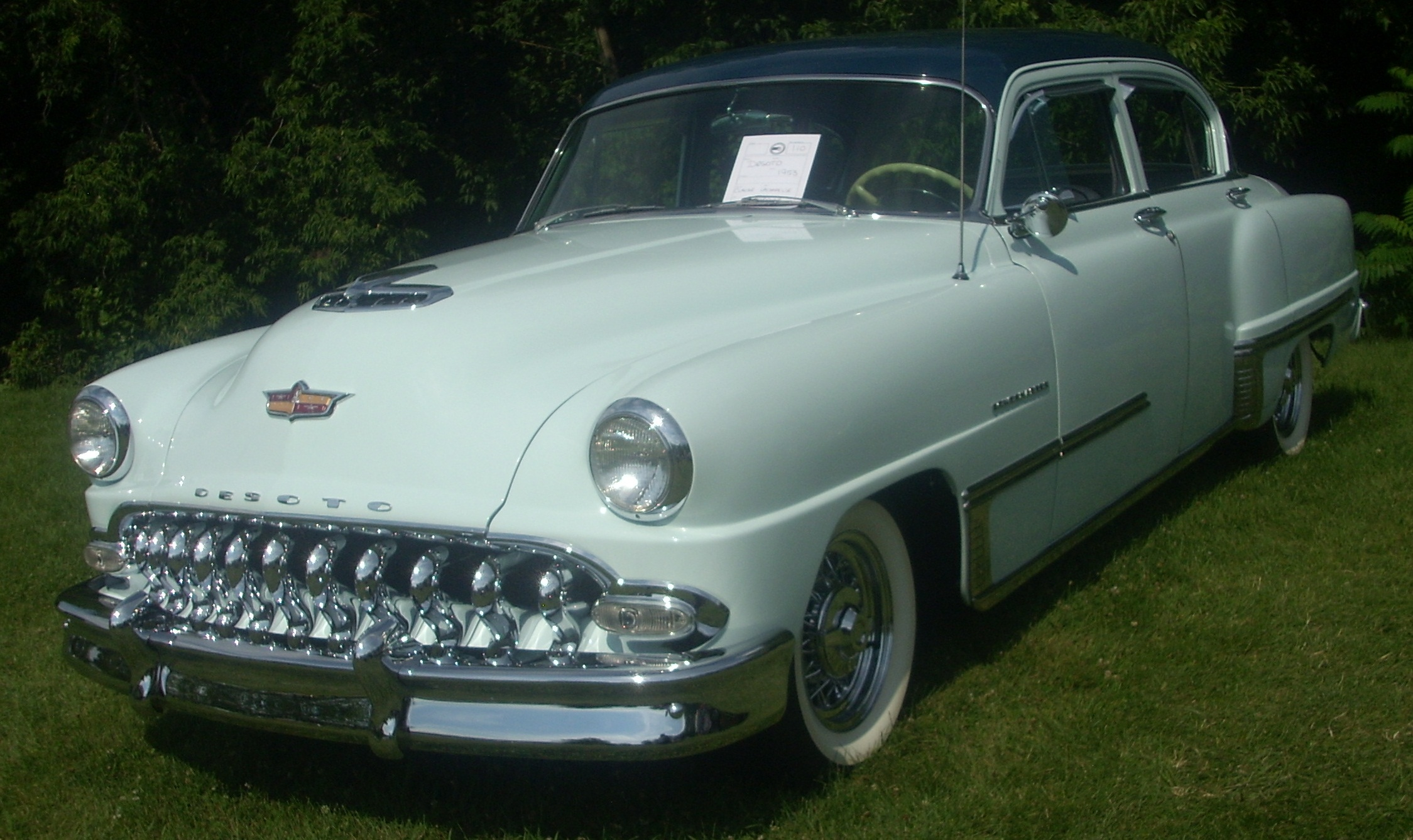
- 1953 DeSoto Powermaster Six Four-Door Sedan

Overview
- Manufacturer: DeSoto (Chrysler)
- Production: 1953–1954
- Assembly: Windsor, Ontario, Canada; Los Angeles (Maywood) Assembly; Wyoming Road Assembly

Body and chassis
- Body style: 2-door coupe 4-door sedan
- Layout: FR layout
- Related: DeSoto Suburban; Dodge Meadowbrook; Plymouth Cranbrook

Powertrain
- Engine: 251 cu in (4.1 L) DeSoto I6; 265 cu in (4.3 L) DeSoto I6

Dimensions
- Wheelbase: 139.5 in (3,543 mm)

Chronology
- Predecessor: DeSoto Series S-10
- Successor: DeSoto Firedome

The DeSoto Powermaster was an automobile built by DeSoto during model years 1953 to 1954. The car debuted during DeSoto's 25th anniversary, taking the place of the entry-level DeSoto Deluxe.

The Powermaster was a full-size car, offered in pillared two and four-door sedan and station wagon models, and powered by Chrysler's 251 cu in (4.1 L) DeSoto I6 engine. For both of its years in production, the Powermaster was available as an eight-passenger sedan through the use of jump seats, called the DeSoto Suburban. The Powermaster was also built on a longer wheelbase (139.5 in (3,543 mm)) than regular six-passenger DeSotos (125.5 in (3,188 mm)). A version of the long wheelbase model was used as a basis for the DeSoto Taxi, seen in many Hollywood movies from the late 1930s through the mid-1950s.

The cars also featured a curved windshield, replacing the two piece windshield used on previous models. Passenger compartment heater, electric clock, power brakes, power steering and white sidewall tires were all available as options.

Powermasters built early in the 1953 model year had minimal chrome trim due to Korean War demands; more trim was added as defense demands decreased.

Chrysler of Canada built the DeSoto Powermaster in both 4-door sedan and 2-door hardtop body styles, the latter not offered in the United States. The Canadian DeSoto Powermaster also used Chrysler's 265 cu in (4.3 L) flathead I6, an engine that first appeared in the 1952 Chrysler Windsor.

The Powermaster was discontinued for the 1955 model year, when DeSoto transitioned all of its automotive models to DeSoto Firedome V8 engines.

== Gallery ==
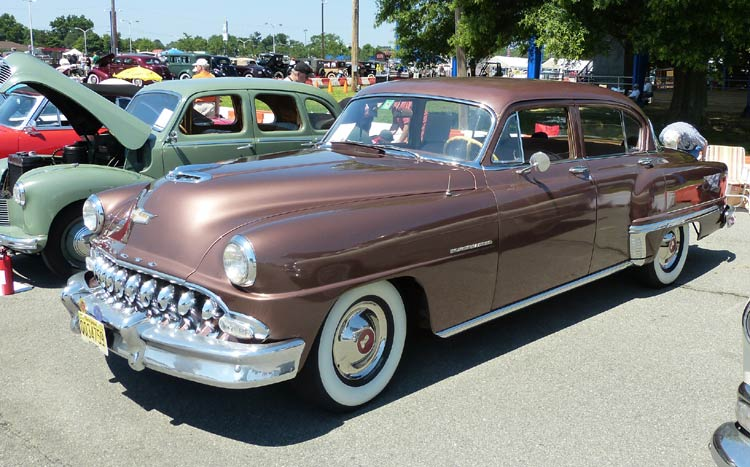
1953 DeSoto Powermaster Six Four-Door Sedan
