= DeSoto Firesweep =

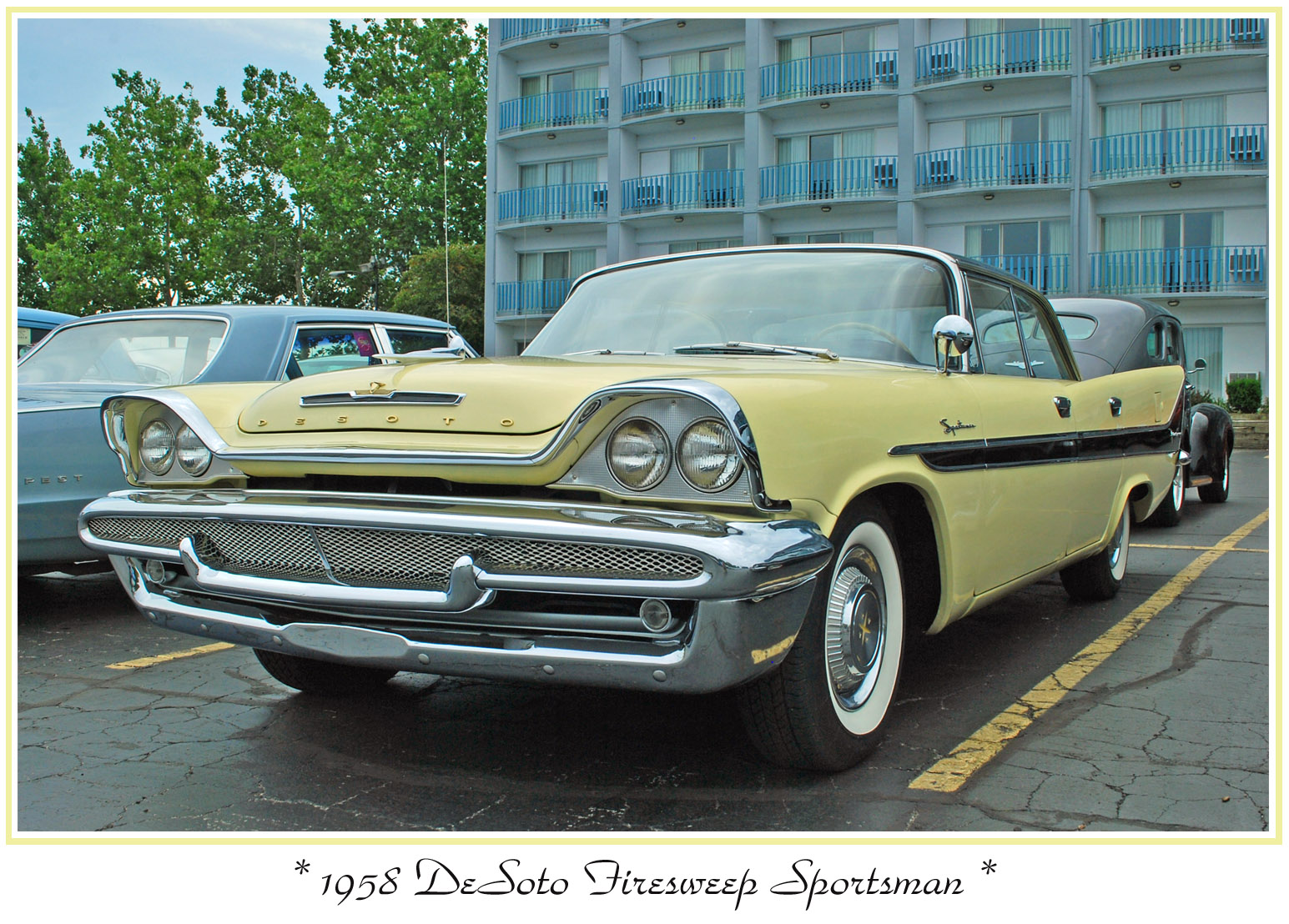
- 1958 DeSoto Firesweep 4-door Sportsman

Overview
- Manufacturer: DeSoto (Chrysler)
- Also called: DeSoto Diplomat (export)
- Production: 1957–1959; 67 years ago
- Assembly: Los Angeles (Maywood) Assembly; United States; Australia

Body and chassis
- Class: Full-size
- Body style: 4-door sedan 2-door hardtop 4-door hardtop 2-door convertible 4-door station wagon
- Layout: FR layout
- Related: Chrysler Windsor; Dodge Coronet; Plymouth Belvedere

Powertrain
- Engine: 325 cu in (5.3 L) V8; 350 cu in (5.7 L) V8; 361 cu in (5.9 L) V8

Chronology
- Predecessor: DeSoto Firedome

The DeSoto Firesweep is an automobile that was produced by DeSoto from 1957 through 1959.

== Interior and exterior description ==
The Firesweep was a lower-priced entry that combined a Dodge shell and chassis (which featured a 122-inch wheelbase, four inches shorter than that of the senior DeSotos) with a DeSoto bumper and grille. 1957 models were sold only as imports in Canada. While the Firesweep featured DeSoto's signature tailfins, the front clip (the front section, forward of the firewall) was based on the Dodge Coronet. The most telling feature was the headlight design, housed under heavily chromed lids typical of Dodge. Firesweep grilles were similar to those on other contemporary DeSoto models.

The Firesweep could seat six passengers. It was available initially as a four-door sedan, four-door station wagon, two-door hardtop and four-door hardtop. A convertible was added for 1958. Depending on the body style, Firesweeps weighed between 3,660 and 3,980 pounds (1,660 and 1,810 kg). The base price of the Firesweep (1957) was US$3,169 and it was offered in one and two-tone exterior finishes. Features included power steering, power brakes, dashboard clock, push-button radio and whitewall tires.

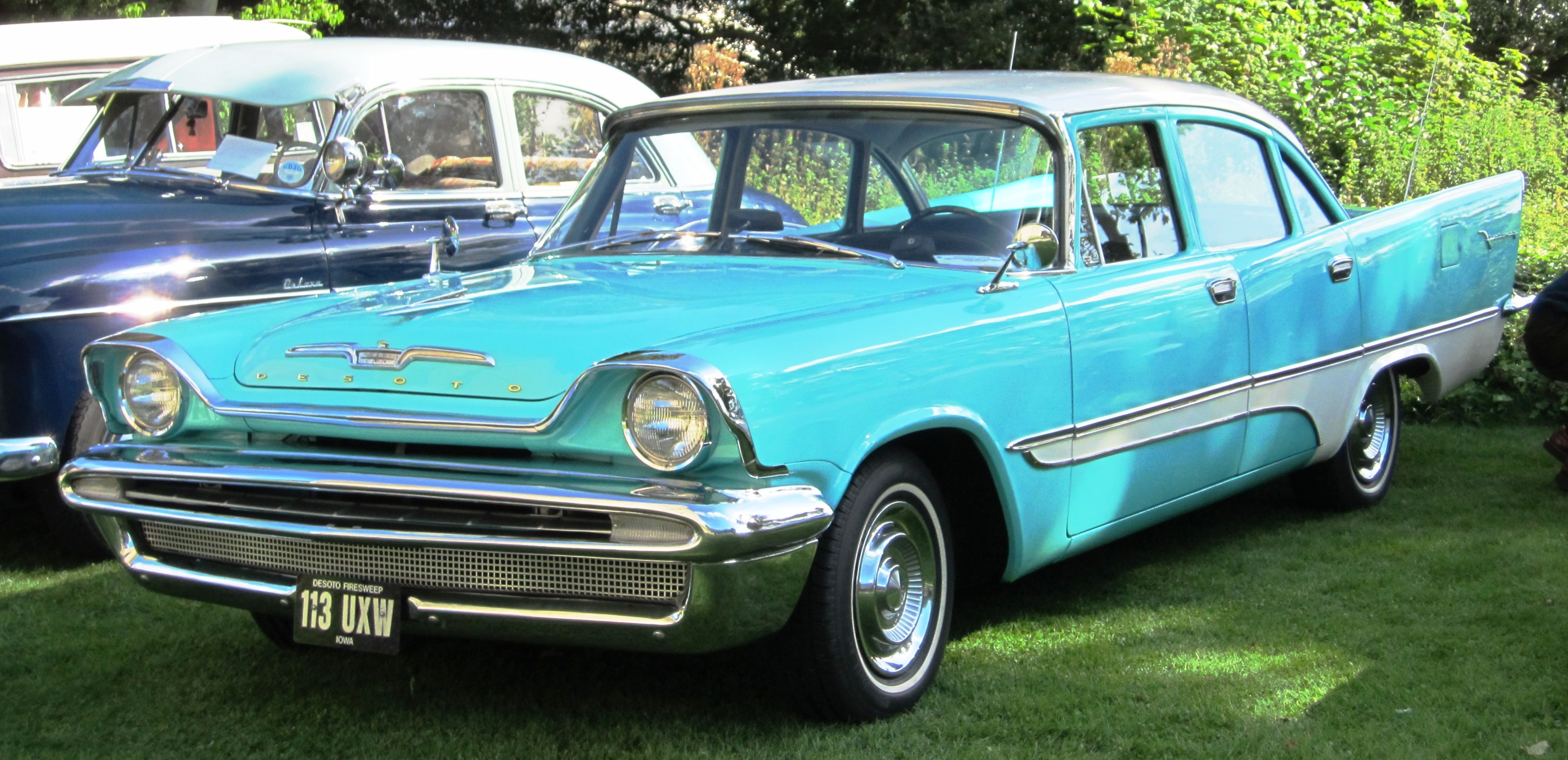
1957 DeSoto Firesweep 4 Door Sedan

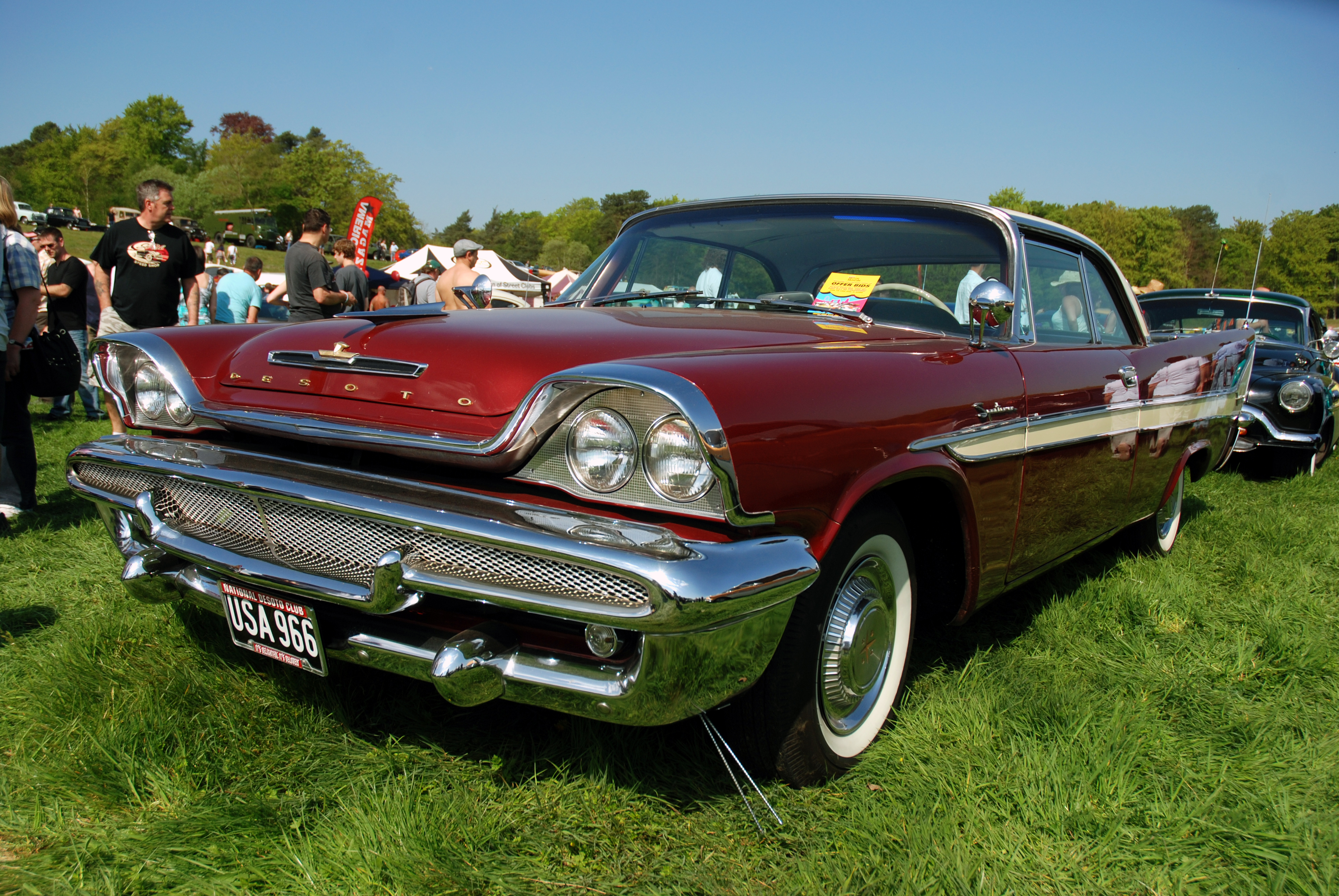
1958 DeSoto Firesweep 2 Door Sportsman

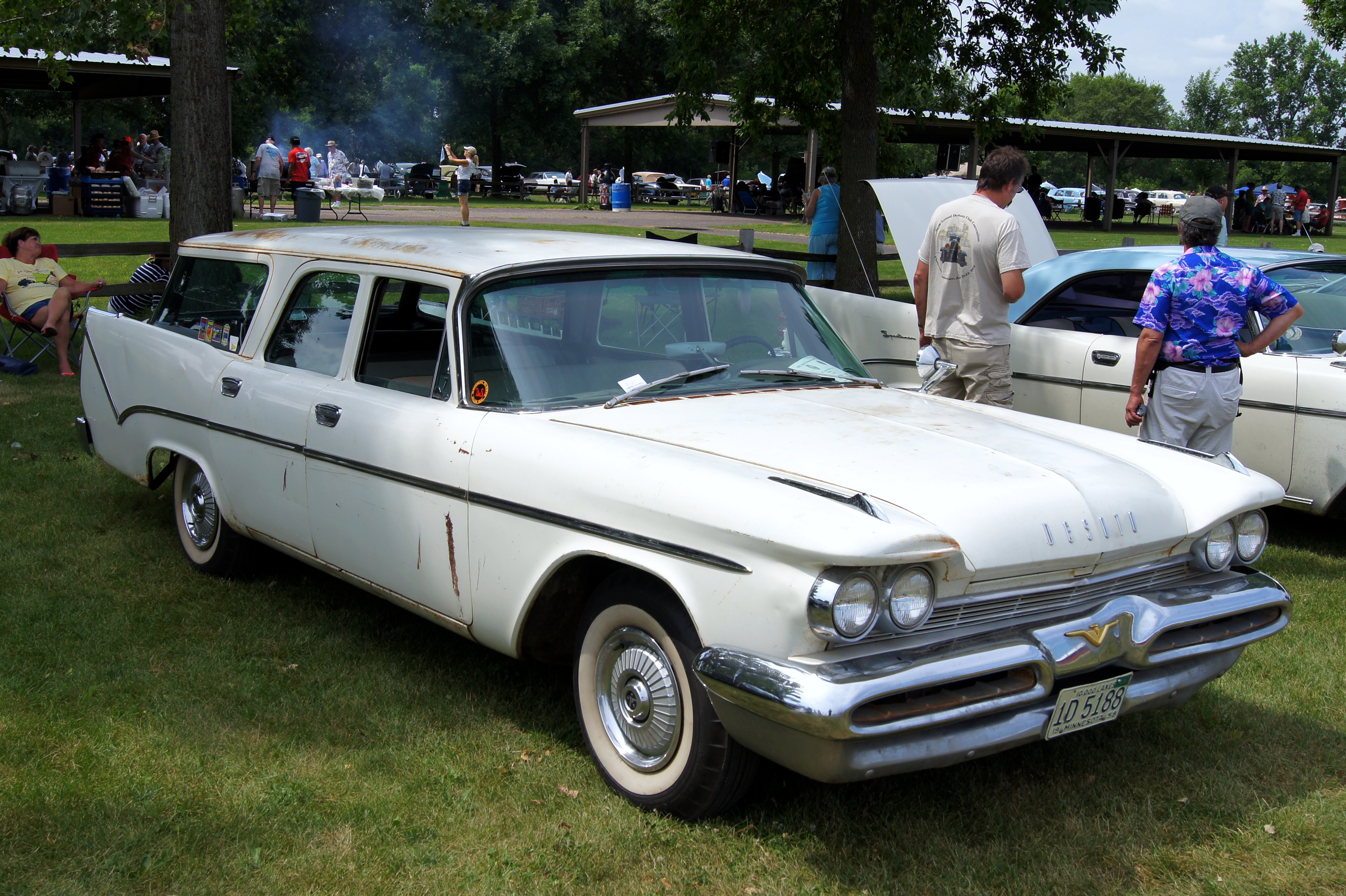
1959 DeSoto Firesweep 4 Door Explorer

== Production and sales ==
The first year of the car’s production, 1957, was the best year for Firesweep sales. A decline in DeSoto quality and increasing market pressures led to the end of the Firesweep’s production at the end of the 1959 model year. During 1959 Firesweep cars carried only DeSoto external nameplates.

For 1960, DeSoto automobiles came in two series: Fireflite and the Adventurer.

The final Desoto model, lacking a series name, was offered for the 1961 model year. DeSoto production ended in November 1960.

== Engine specifications, transmission, options ==
In 1957, the DeSoto Firesweep was powered by the Dodge "Poly" 325 V8 with a 2bbl Stromberg down-draft carburetor. The 325 was basically a detuned polyspherical combustion chambered version of the Dodge "Red Ram" 325 Hemi. With the optional power-pack four-barrel V8, the 1957 Firesweep produced 260 hp at 4400 rpm. This represented an increase of fifteen horsepower over the two-barrel engine.

The 1958 Firesweep was fitted with a 350 cu in (5.7 L) V8 and the 1959 model with a 361 cu in (5.9 L) V8

The Firesweep was offered with three different transmissions as well: a two-speed PowerFlite, a three-speed TorqueFlite, or a three-speed column-shifted manual.

The Firesweep was available with up to a three-color paint job (the body was a different color than the "sweep" on the side of the body, and the roof was a different color still). DeSoto offered a laundry list of options for the vehicle to include, but not limited to: clock, AM radio, rear speaker, air conditioning, carpeting, deluxe cloth seat inserts, dual rear antennae, deluxe interior lighting, stainless steel stone shields, power steering, and power brakes.

== Australian production ==
The DeSoto Firesweep was also produced in Australia from 1958 to 1960. Production of the 1958 model began at Chrysler Australia’s Mile End facility in South Australia in early 1958, utilizing CKD components imported from Detroit. It was offered as a four-door sedan with a 350-cubic-inch V8 engine. The 1959 Firesweep, released in July 1959, was also assembled from CKD components, and was equipped with a 361-cubic-inch V8 engine and a push-button automatic transmission. The Firesweep was replaced on the Australian market in 1960 by the locally produced Dodge Phoenix.

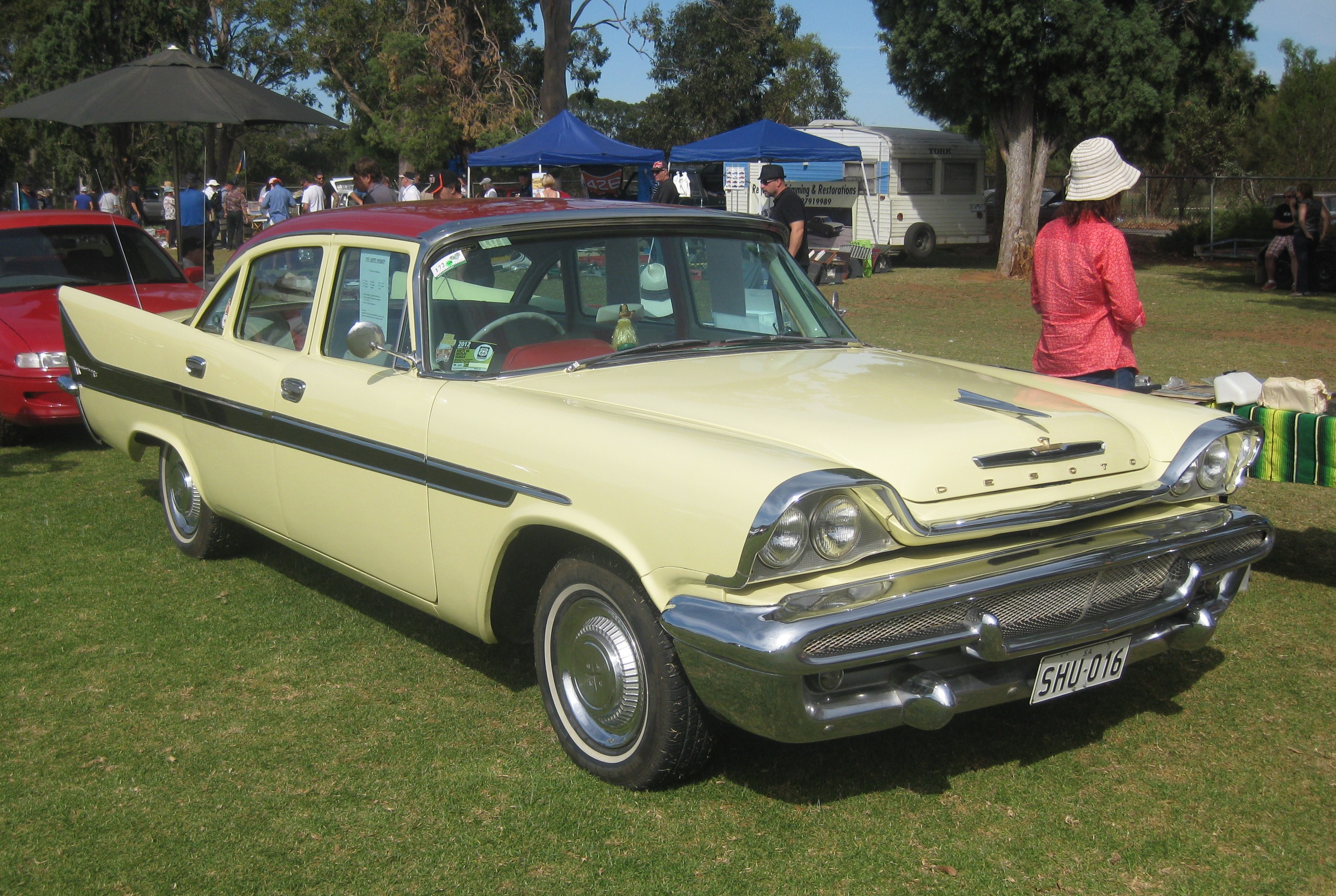
Australian produced 1958 DeSoto Firesweep Sedan

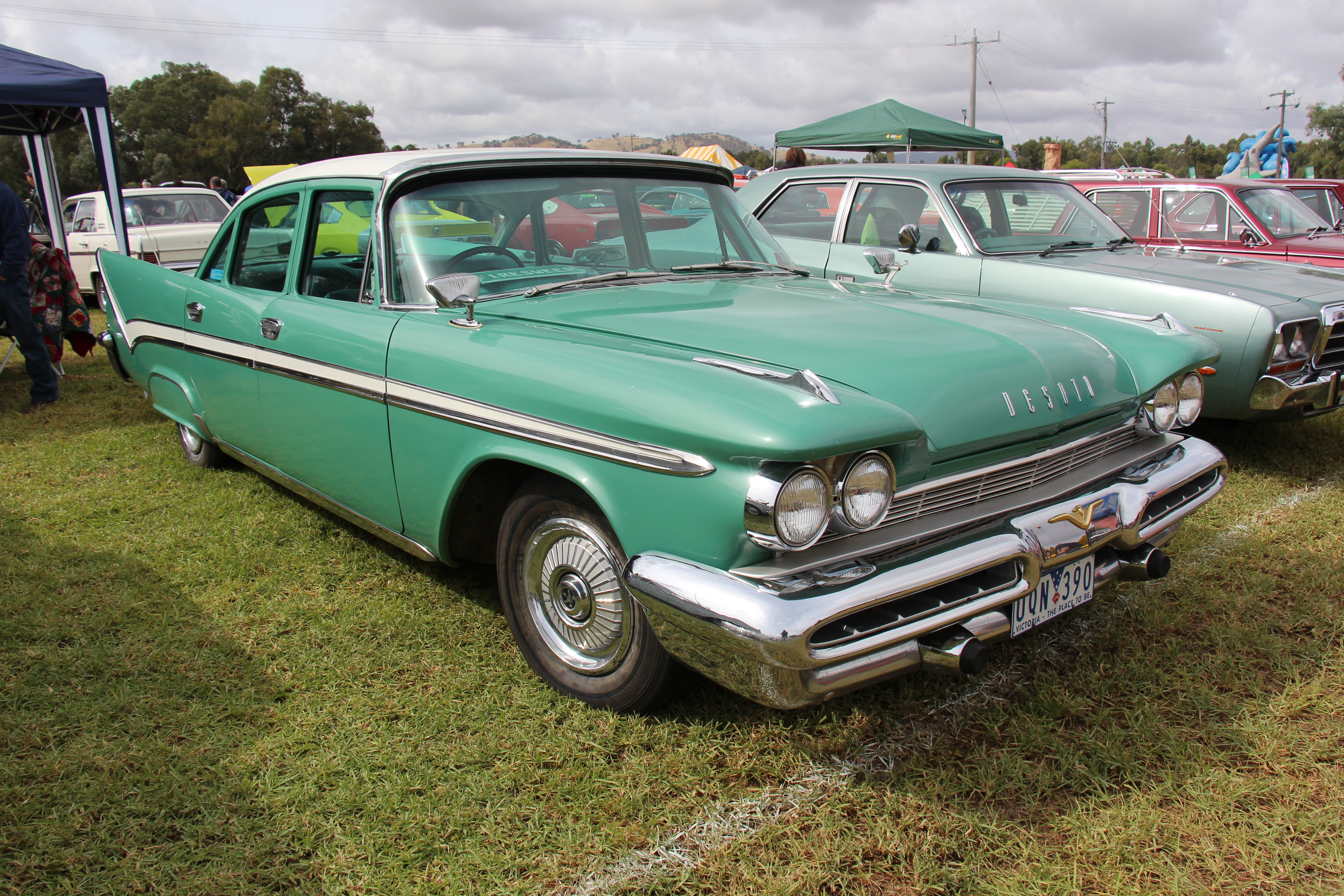
Australian-produced 1959 DeSoto Firesweep Sedan
