= DeSoto Firedome =

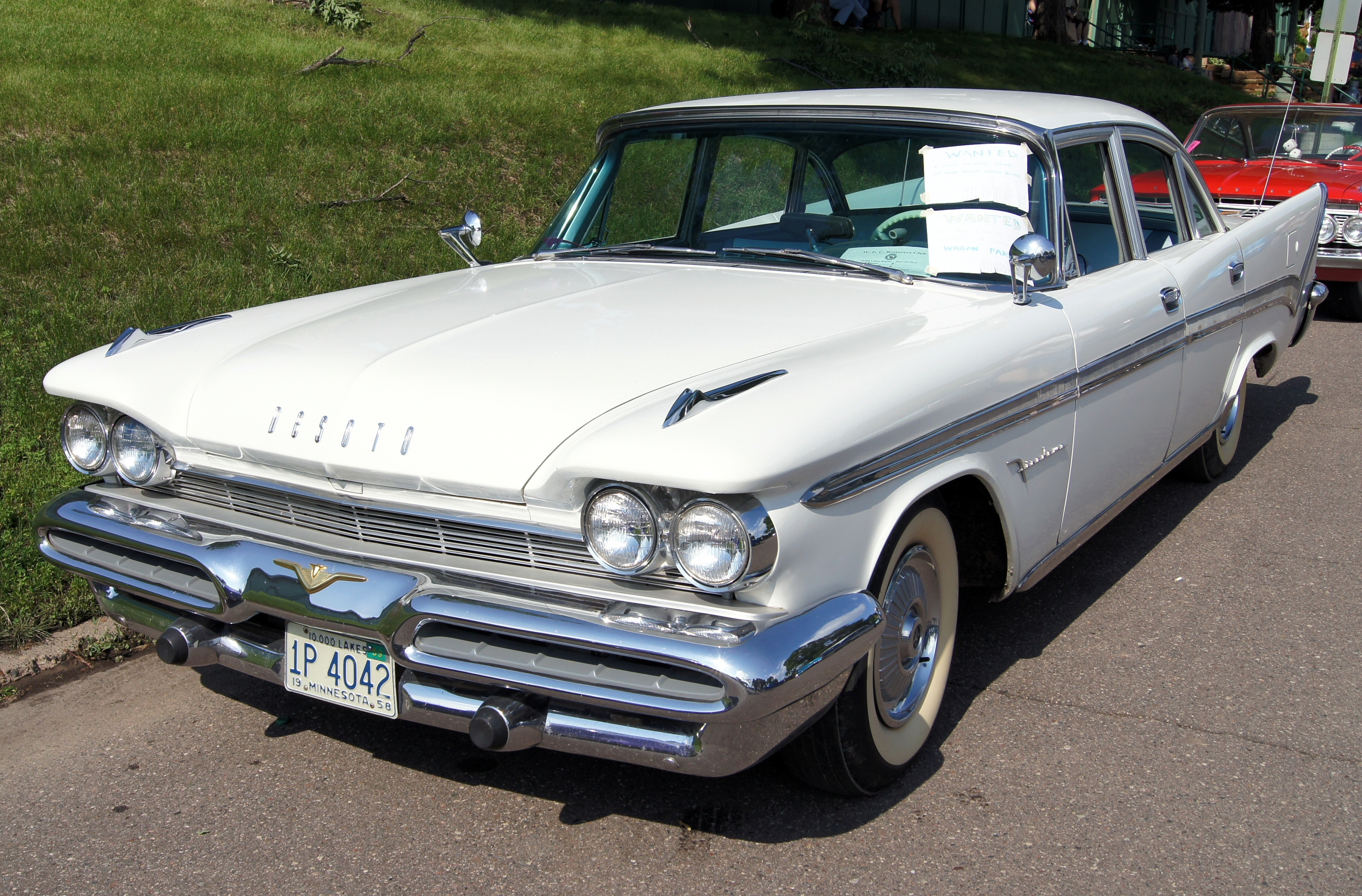
- 1959 DeSoto Firedome 4-door sedan

Overview
- Manufacturer: DeSoto (Chrysler)
- Production: 1952–1959
- Assembly: Los Angeles (Maywood) Assembly; Wyoming Road Assembly

Body and chassis
- Class: Full-size
- Layout: FR layout
- Related: Dodge Meadowbrook; Plymouth Cranbrook

Chronology
- Predecessor: DeSoto Fireflite

The DeSoto Firedome was a full-size automobile produced between 1952 and 1959 by the DeSoto division of the Chrysler Corporation. Introduced as DeSoto's premium line of vehicles for the 1952 model year, it retained that position until demoted to the least expensive model for 1955. It was reclassified to become a mid-range vehicle for 1957 and was discontinued for the 1960 model year.

== Topline series, 1952–1954 ==
First generation
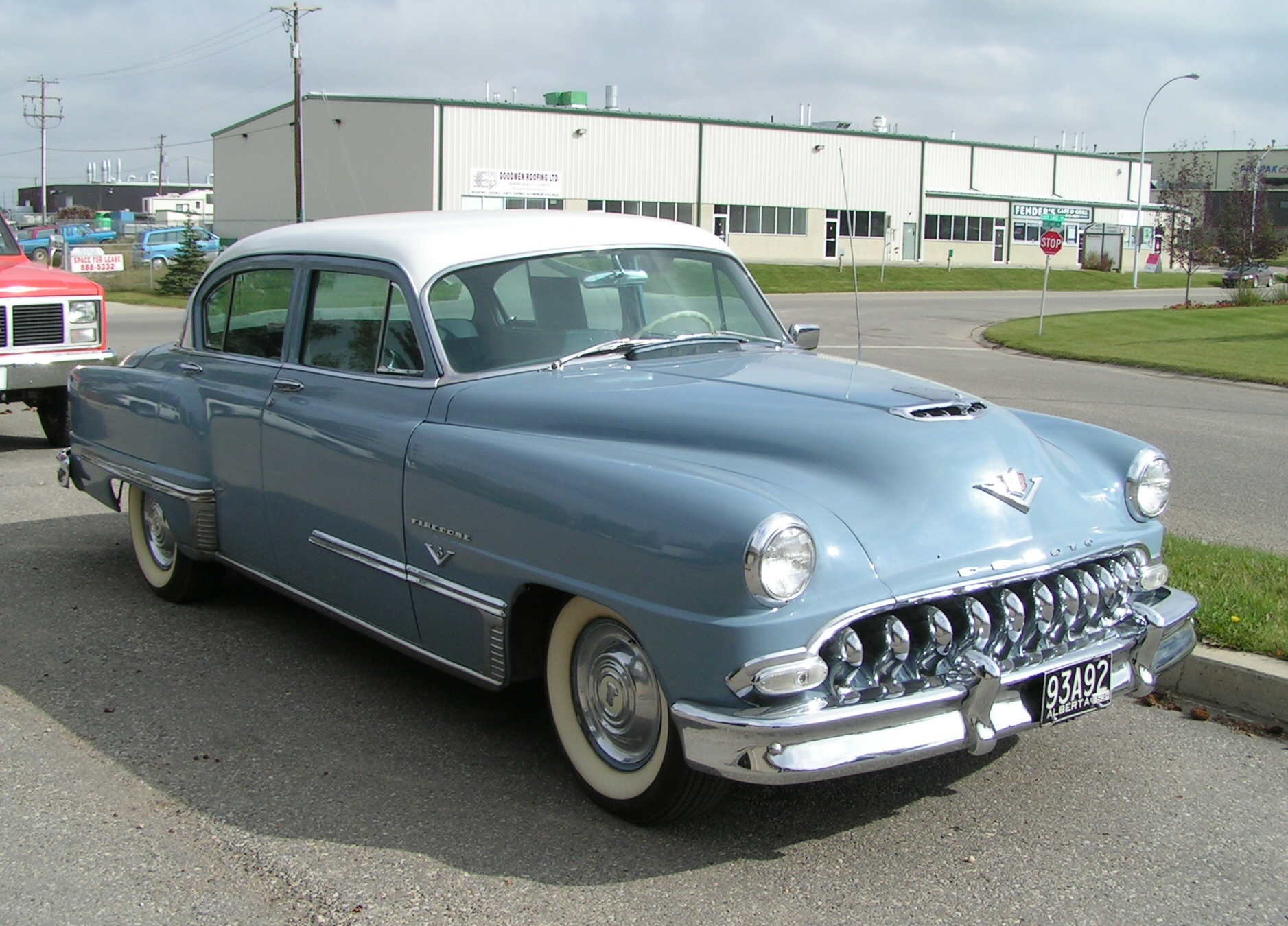
- 1953 DeSoto Firedome 4-door sedan

Overview
- Production: 1952–1954

Body and chassis
- Body style: 2-door coupe 4-door sedan 4-door station wagon 2-door convertible

Powertrain
- Engine: 276 cu in (4.5 L) 160 hp (119 kW) V8

The 1953 Firedome was introduced just prior to DeSoto's 25th Anniversary in 1953, and arrived as the new top series, displacing the Custom nameplate which was retired at the end of the 1952 model year. The entire De Soto model lineup was restyled and Firedome prices started at US$2,740 ($32,972 in 2025 dollars). During the 1953 model year, approximately 64,211 examples were produced.

The Firedome could seat six passengers. It was available as a 4-door sedan, 5-door station wagon, 2-door coupe and 2-door convertible. The AM radio was US$85 ($1,023 in 2025 dollars).

The Firedome was powered by a Hemi V8 engine producing 160 hp (120 kW) and had a top speed of 100 mph (160 km/h). The car weighed 3,700 lb (1,700 kg) and had a 0–60 mph (97 km/h) time of 15.5 seconds. This was the first time that DeSoto offered an 8-cylinder engine in one of its models since 1931. By 1953, DeSoto's Firedome Hemi V-8 produced 170 horsepower.

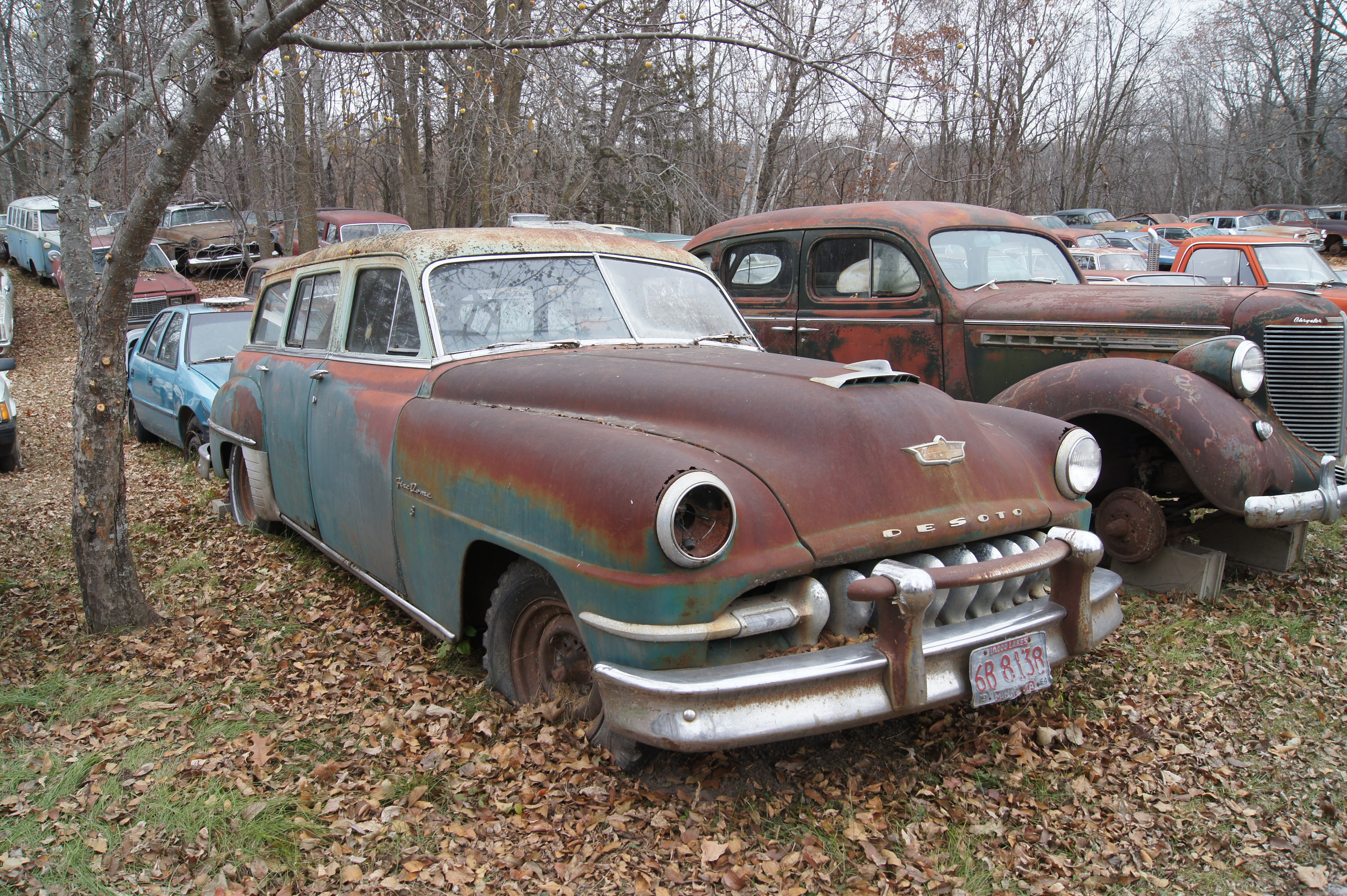
1952 DeSoto Firedome 8 All-Steel Station Wagon

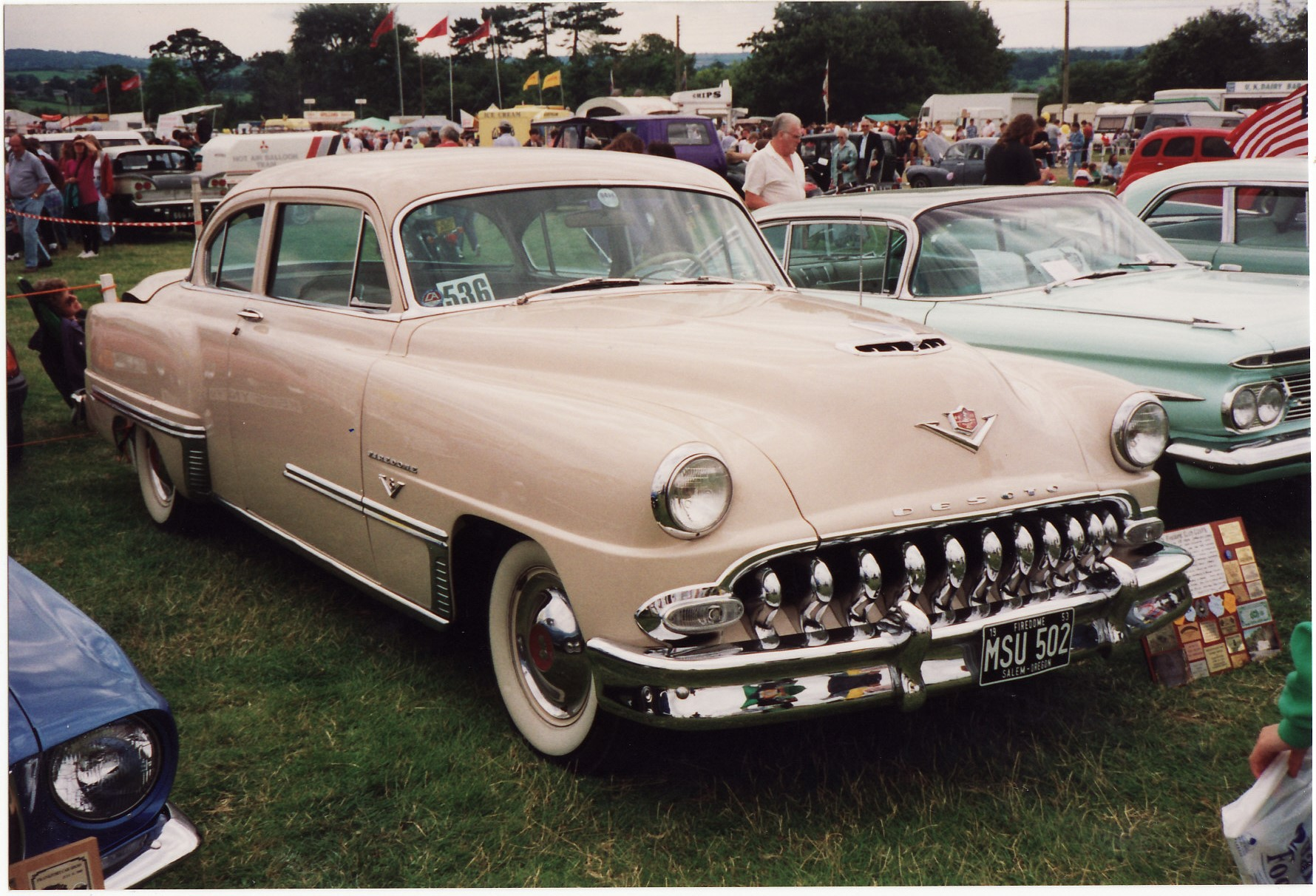
1953 DeSoto Firedome 2-door coupe

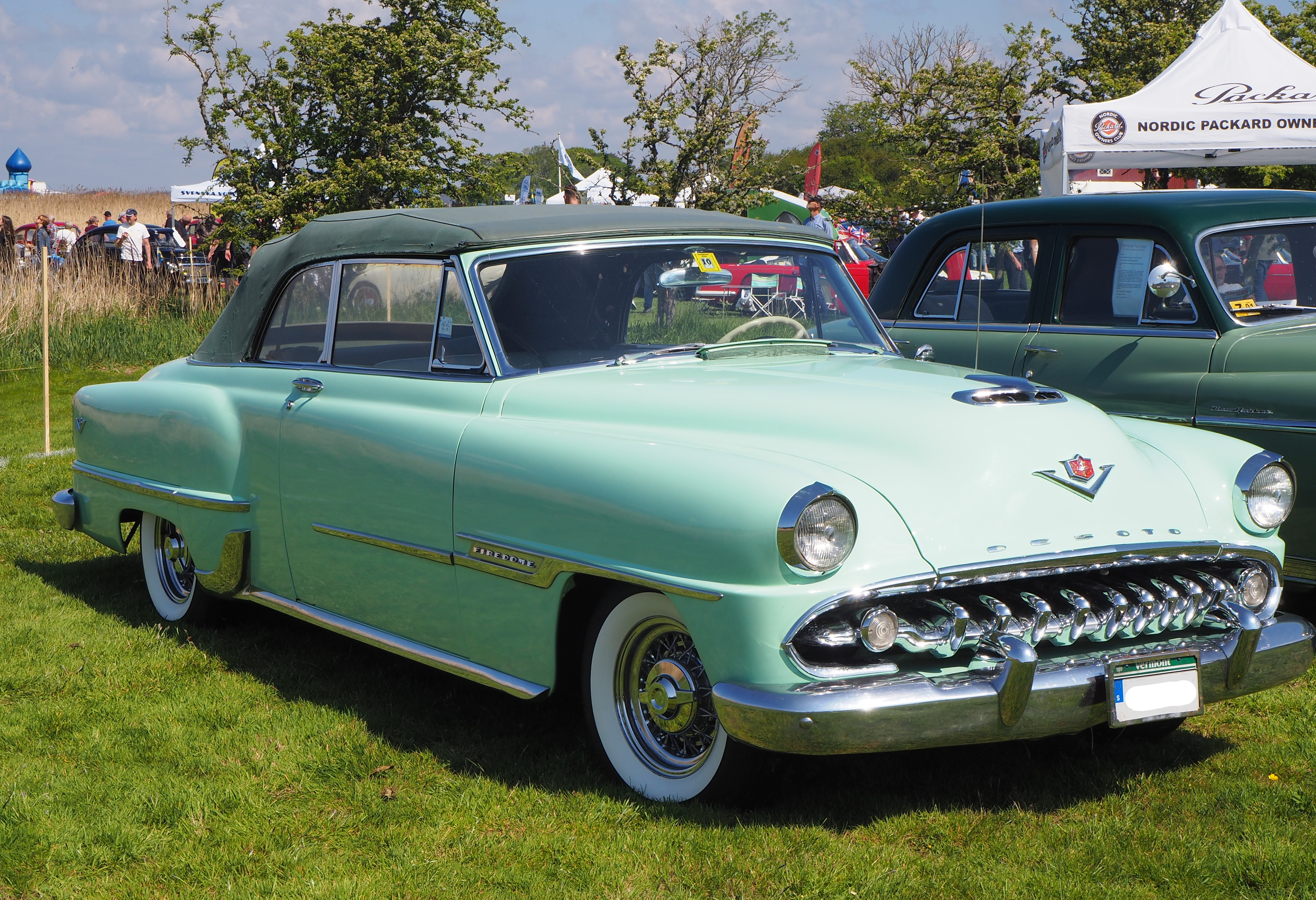
1954 DeSoto Firedome 2-door convertible

== Entry-level series 1955–1956 ==
Second generation
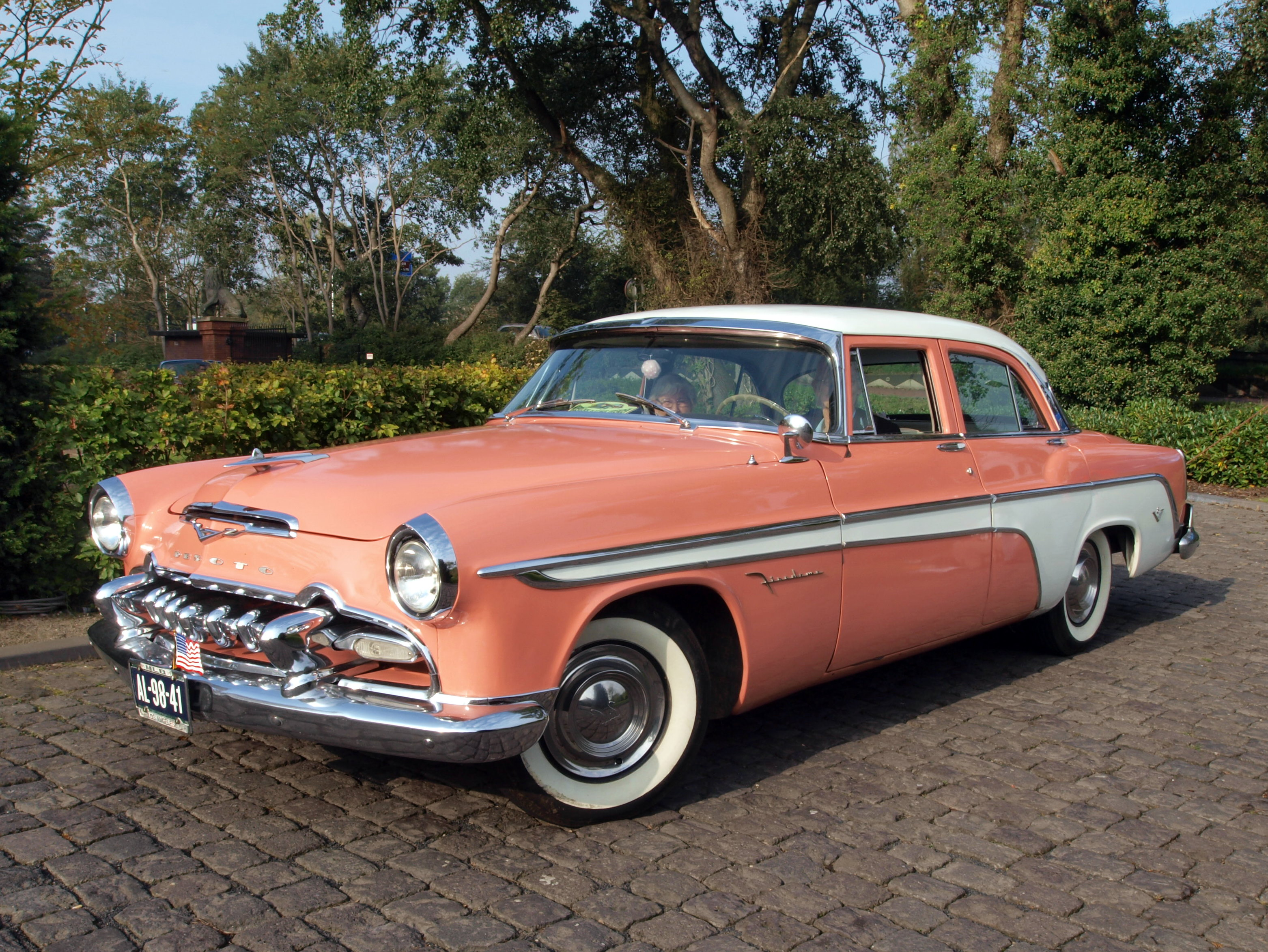
- 1955 DeSoto Firedome 4-door sedan

Overview
- Production: 1955–1956

Body and chassis
- Body style: 2-door coupe 4-door sedan 4-door station wagon 2-door convertible

Powertrain
- Engine: 291 cu in (4.8 L) V8
- Transmission: 2-speed automatic 3-speed manual

Dimensions
- Wheelbase: 126 in (3,200 mm)

In 1955, Chrysler dropped its 6-cylinder DeSoto Powermaster series and added the topline Fireflite series, pushing the Firedome down to entry level status. Still, the Firedome retained its V8 engine, but increasing the 276 c.i. displacement to 291 c.i. with a larger bore, a power boost to 185 horsepower, and coming with a host of features and interior upgrades that were lacking in the Powermaster series. While Powerflite 2-speed automatics were advertised as optional transmission equipment on the Firedome, officially the car was also offered with a 3-speed manual as standard equipment, although few were produced.

In 1956, the Firedome V-8 got another boost in horsepower, to 230 H.P., an increase of 45 horsepower over the previous year.

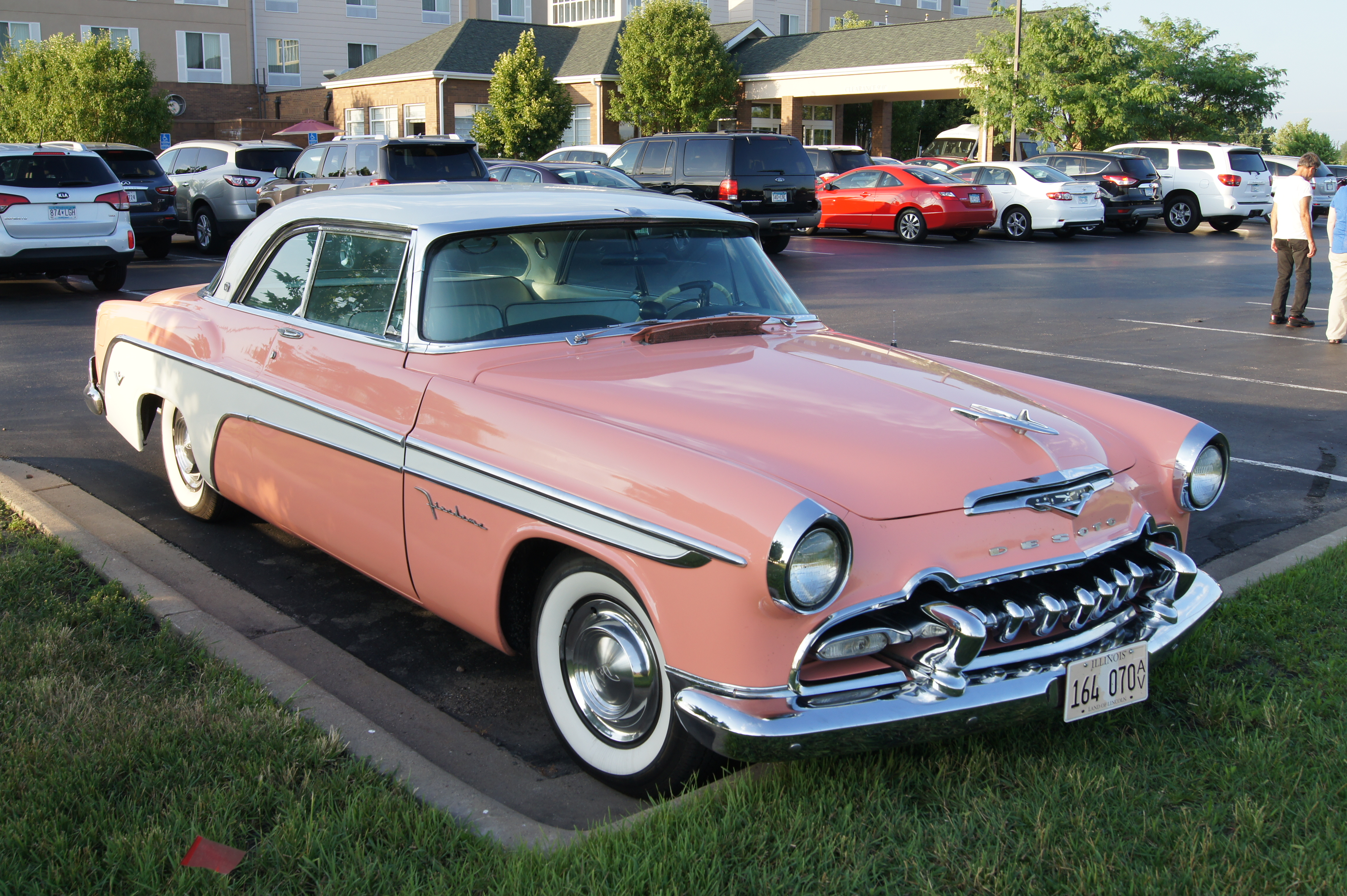
1955 DeSoto Firedome Sportsman 2-door

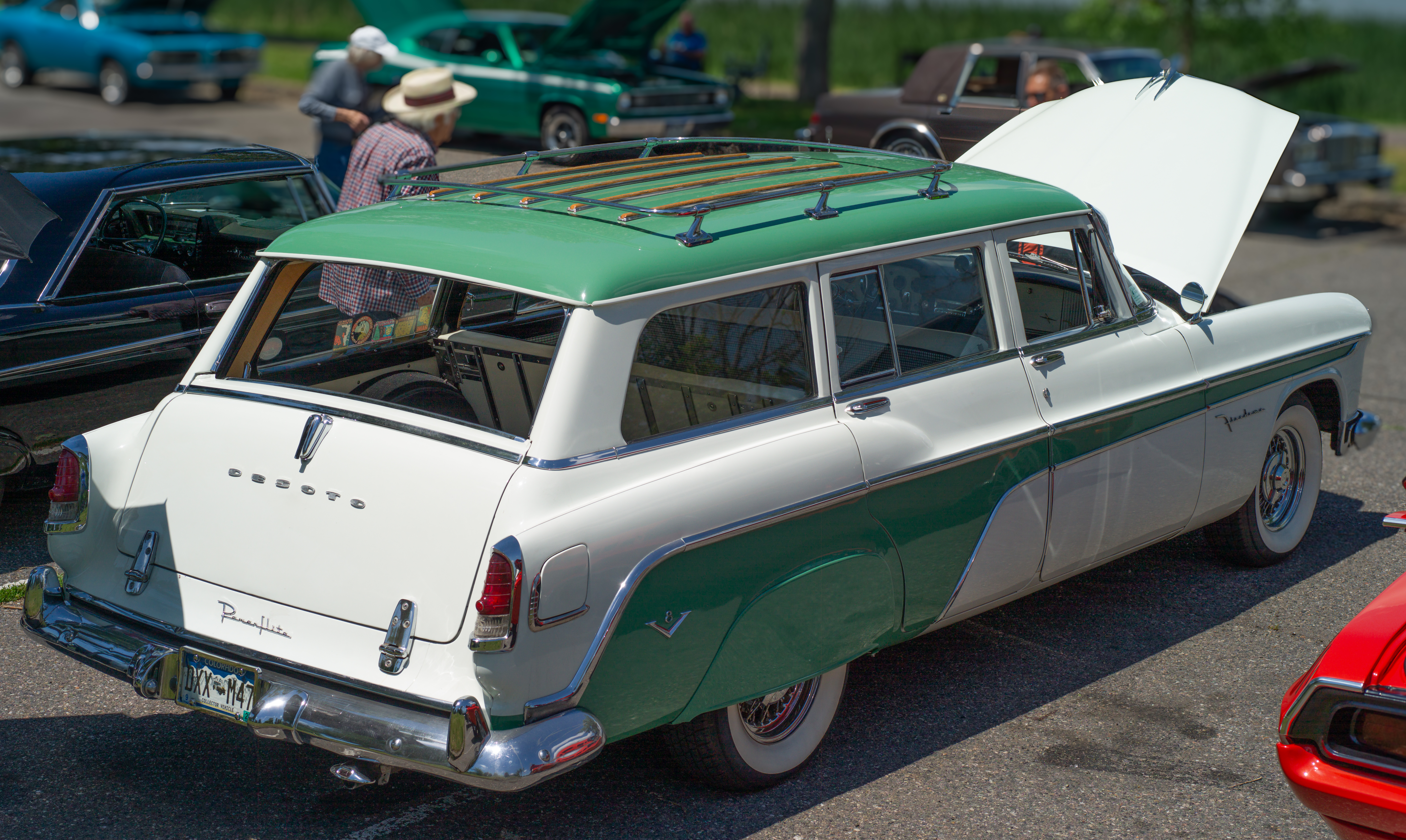
1955 DeSoto Firedome Station Wagon

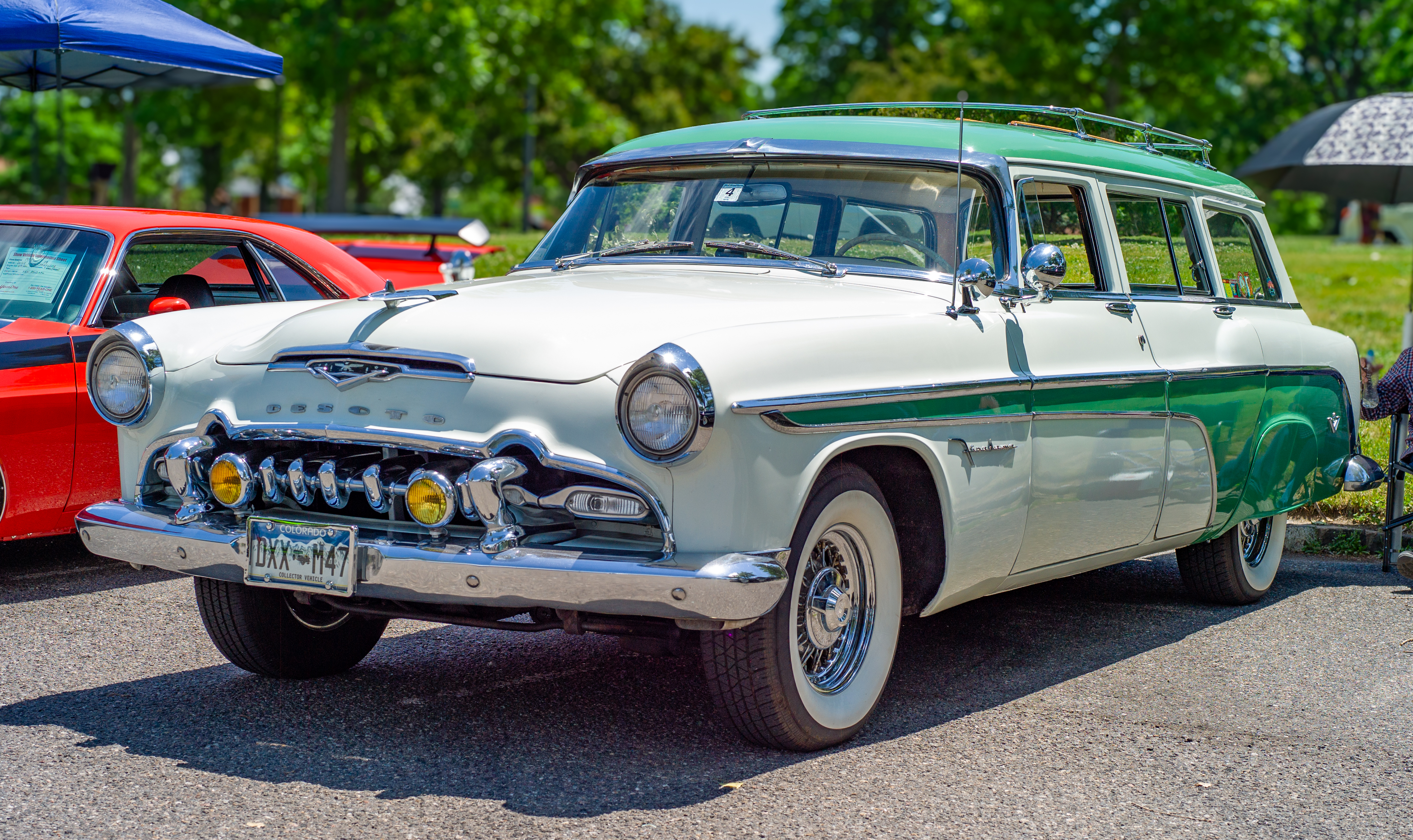
1955 DeSoto Firedome Station Wagon

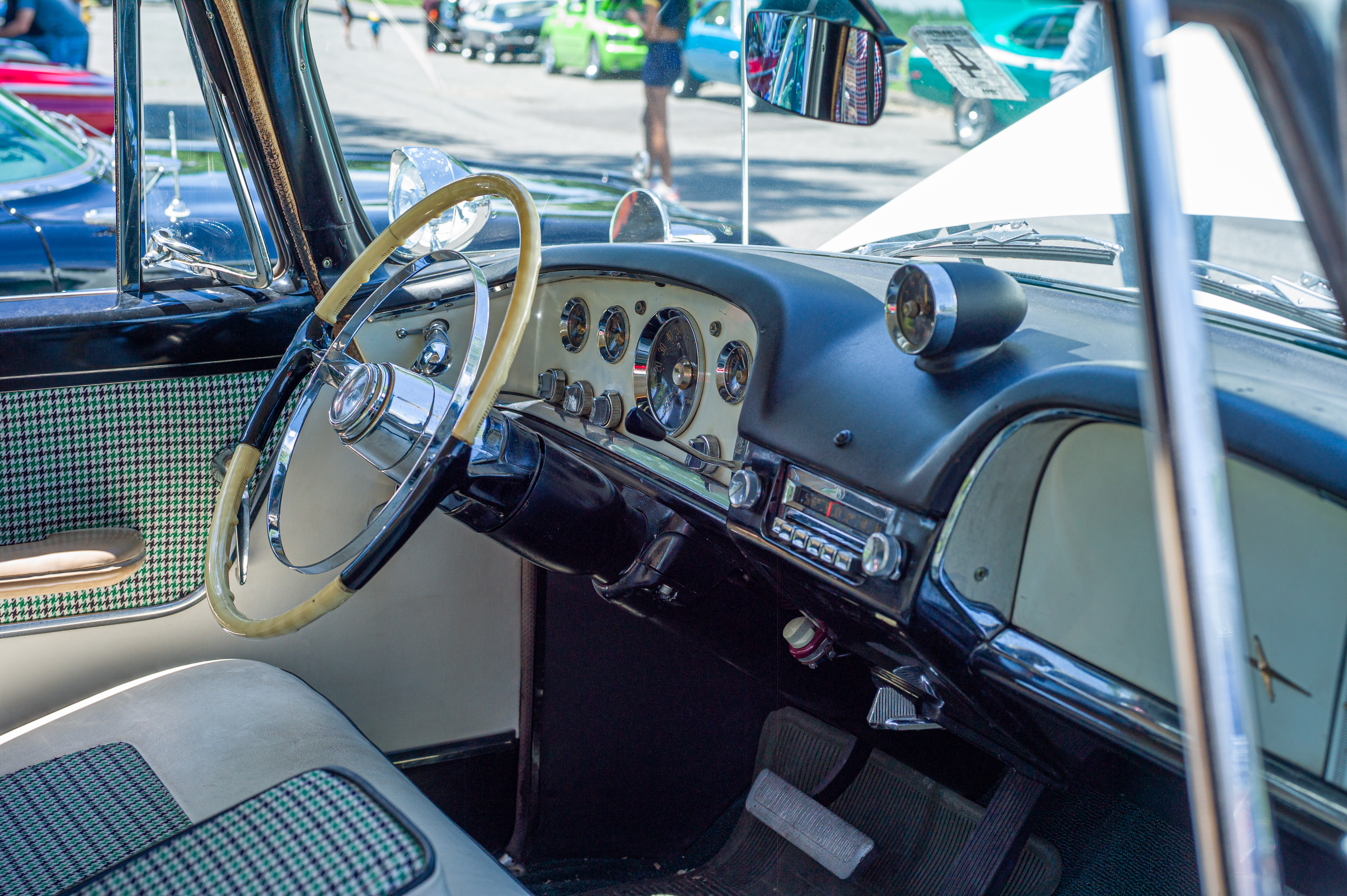
1955 DeSoto Firedome Station Wagon Interior

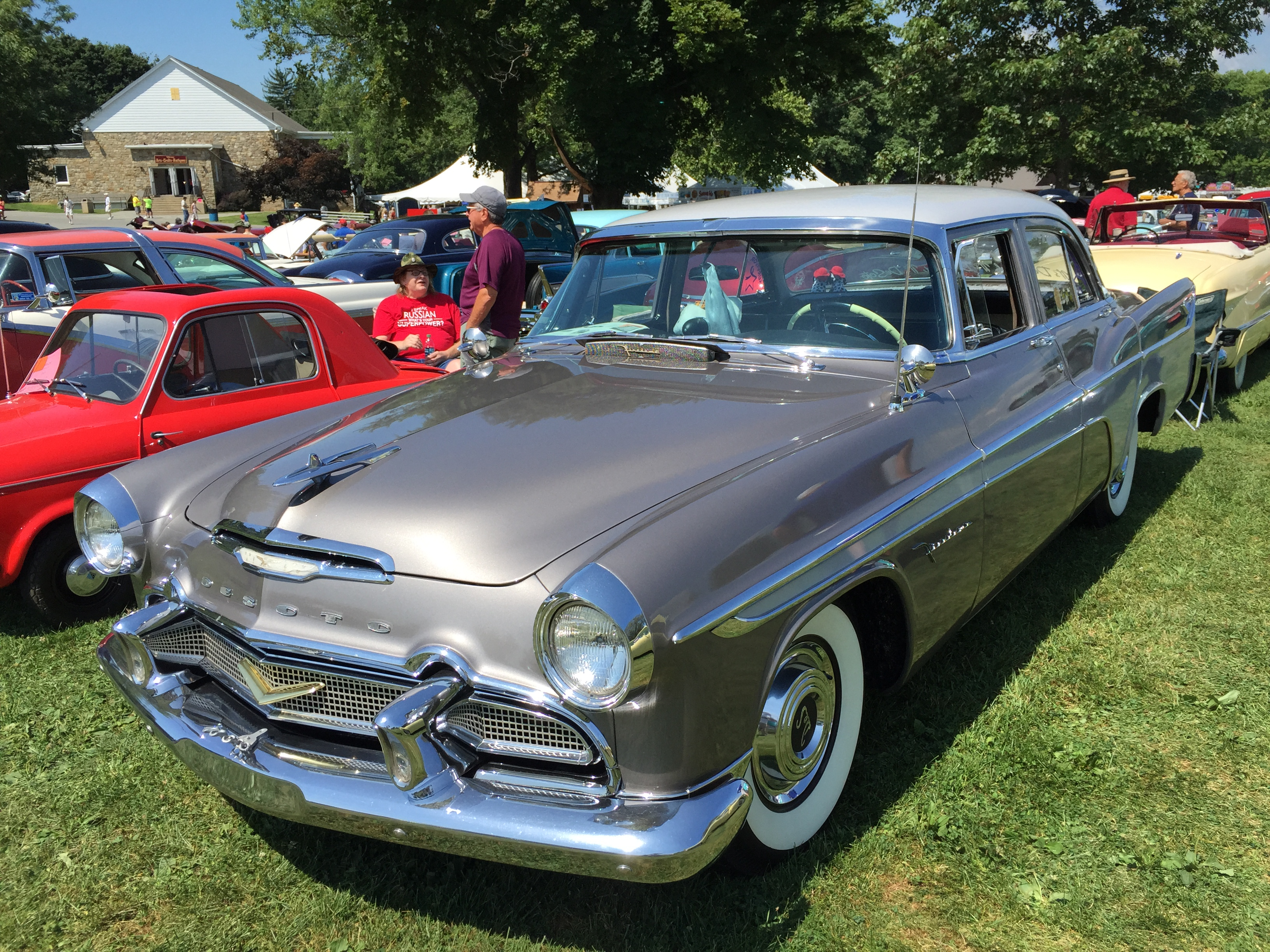
1956 DeSoto Firedome Four-door Sedan

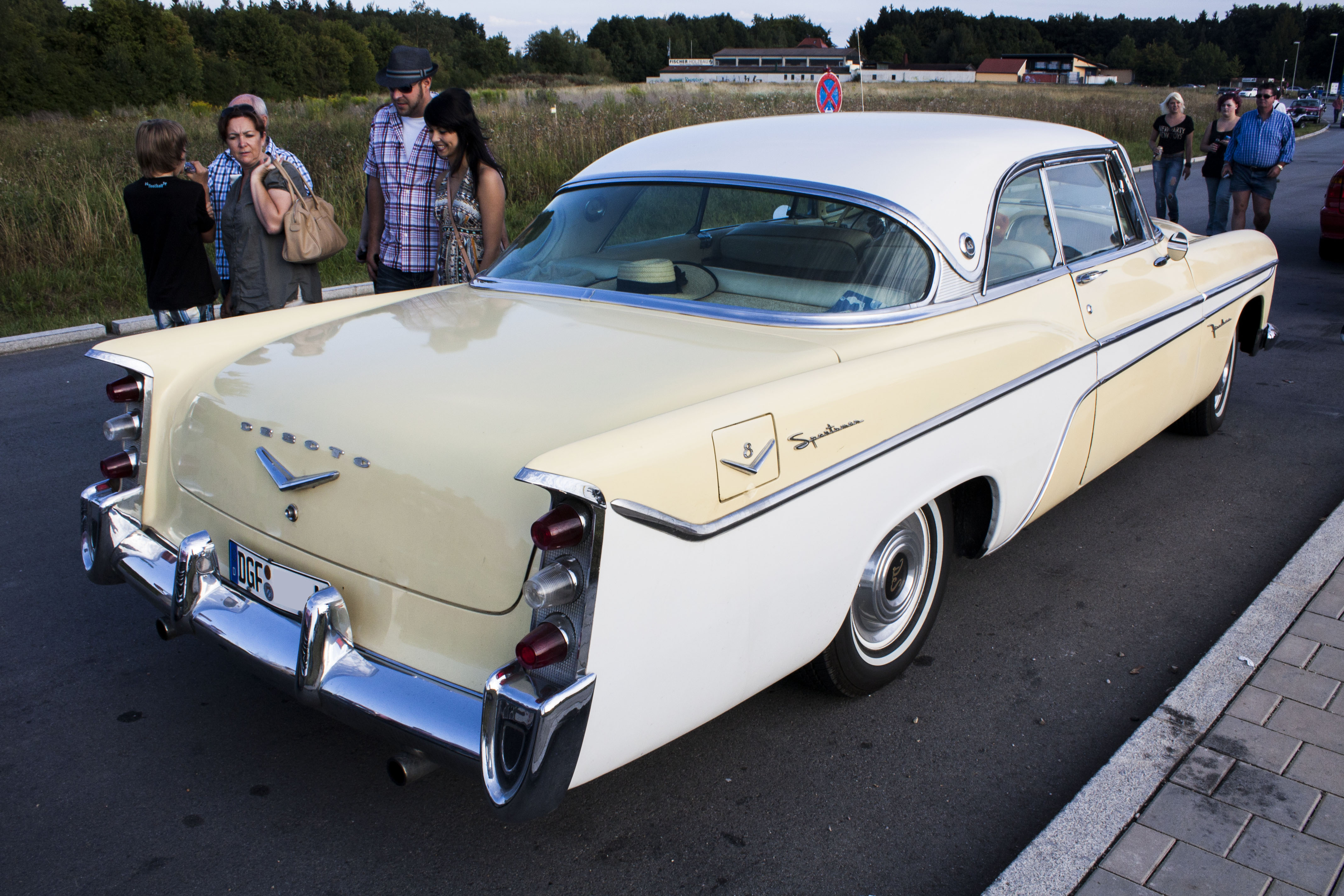
1956 DeSoto Firedome Two-door Sportsman

== Midline series 1957–1959 ==
Third generation
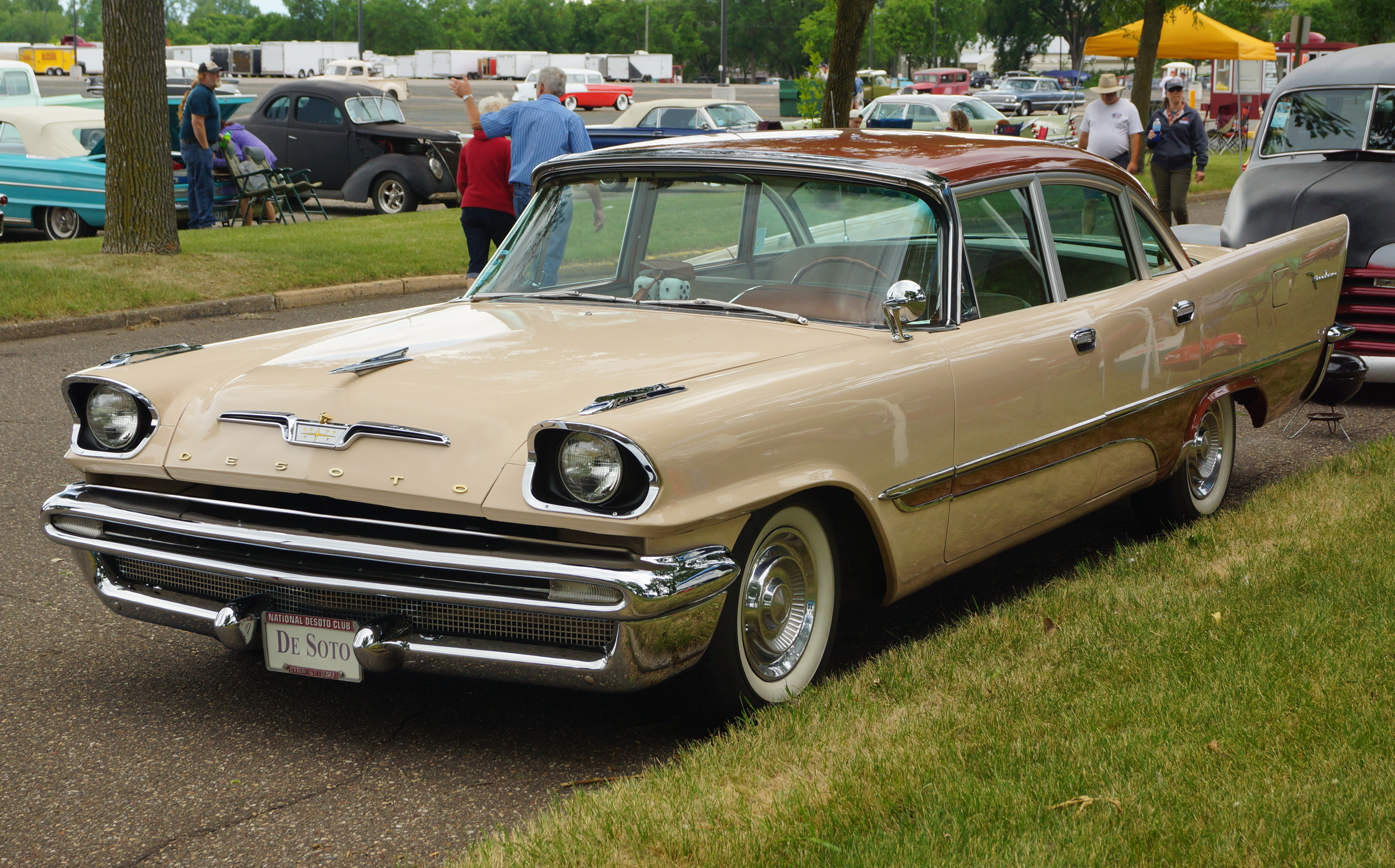
- 1957 DeSoto Firedome 4-door sedan

Overview
- Production: 1957–1959

Body and chassis
- Body style: 2-door coupe 4-door sedan 4-door station wagon 2-door convertible

Powertrain
- Engine: 361 cu in (5.9 L) V8

The series was again moved upmarket in the model offering when the 1957 DeSotos were introduced, with the new entry-level Dodge-based Firesweep. A new air-conditioner was offered.

By 1958 the horsepower had increased to over 300 (220 kW) with the option of the 361 cubic-inch (5,920 cc) V8 engine. Zero to 60 mph (97 km/h) now took just under eight seconds with a top speed of 115 mph (185 km/h). However, 1958 DeSoto's sales decreased by almost 60% from 1957's model year output, partially due to the economy and partially because of build issues with the 1957 models.

In an attempt to attract buyers, Chrysler offered the 1959 DeSoto Firedome in 26 solid colors and 190 two-tone finishes. By the end of the 1959 model year, Chrysler was struggling to find buyers for its DeSoto automobiles. Despite the wide variety of models available, consumers shunned DeSoto automobiles as rumor circulated that Chrysler would phase out the marque. A padded dash was standard.

Firedome production ended at the end of the 1959 model year.

For the 1960 model year DeSoto offered two models, the Fireflite and the Adventurer. For the 1961 model year, a model named only "DeSoto" was sold as a two-door hardtop and four-door hardtop. The end of the DeSoto marque came on November 30, 1960, 48 days after the 1961 models were introduced, ending 32 years of production.

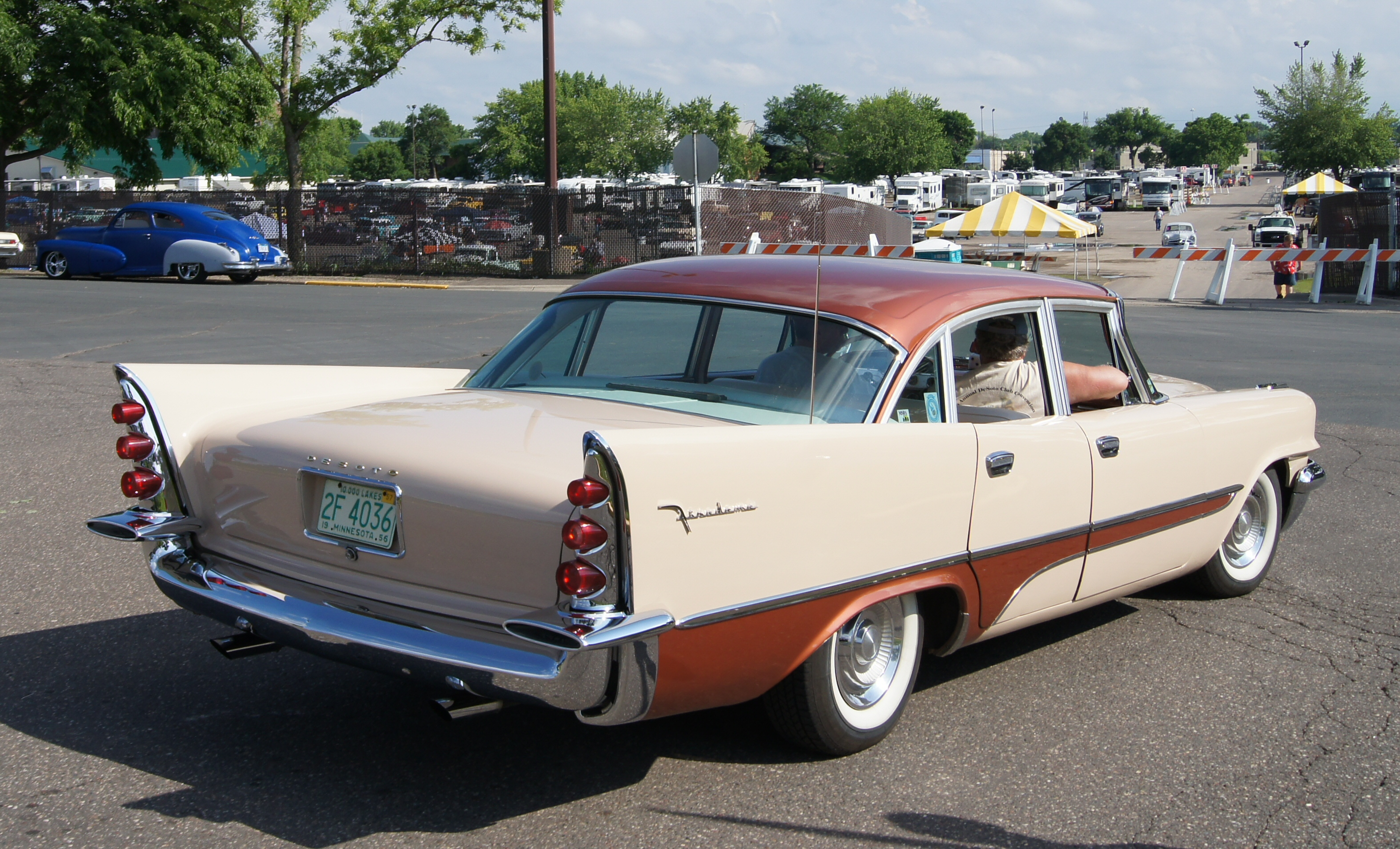
1957 DeSoto Firedome 4-door sedan rear

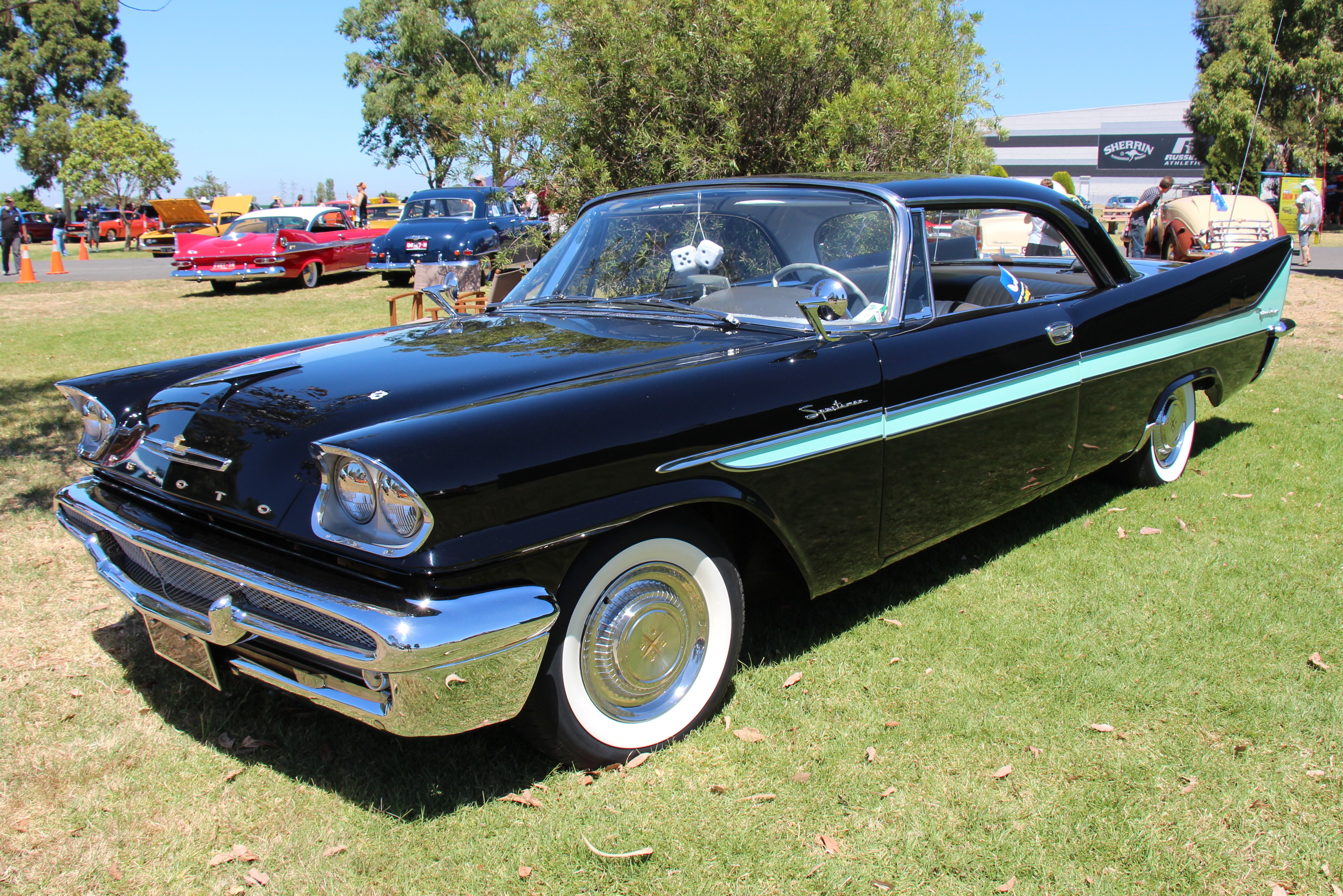
1958 DeSoto Firedome Sportsman 2-door

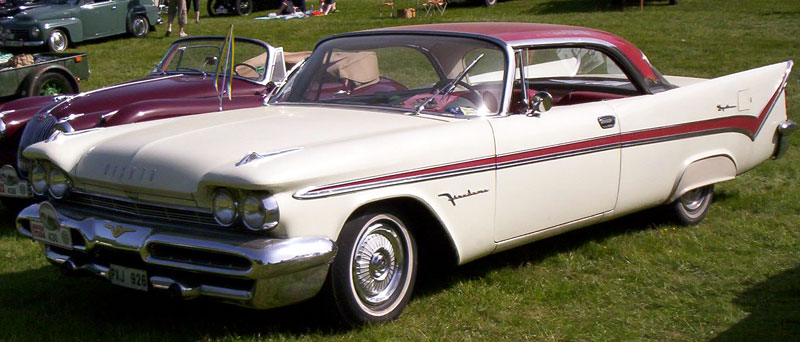
1959 DeSoto Firedome 2-door

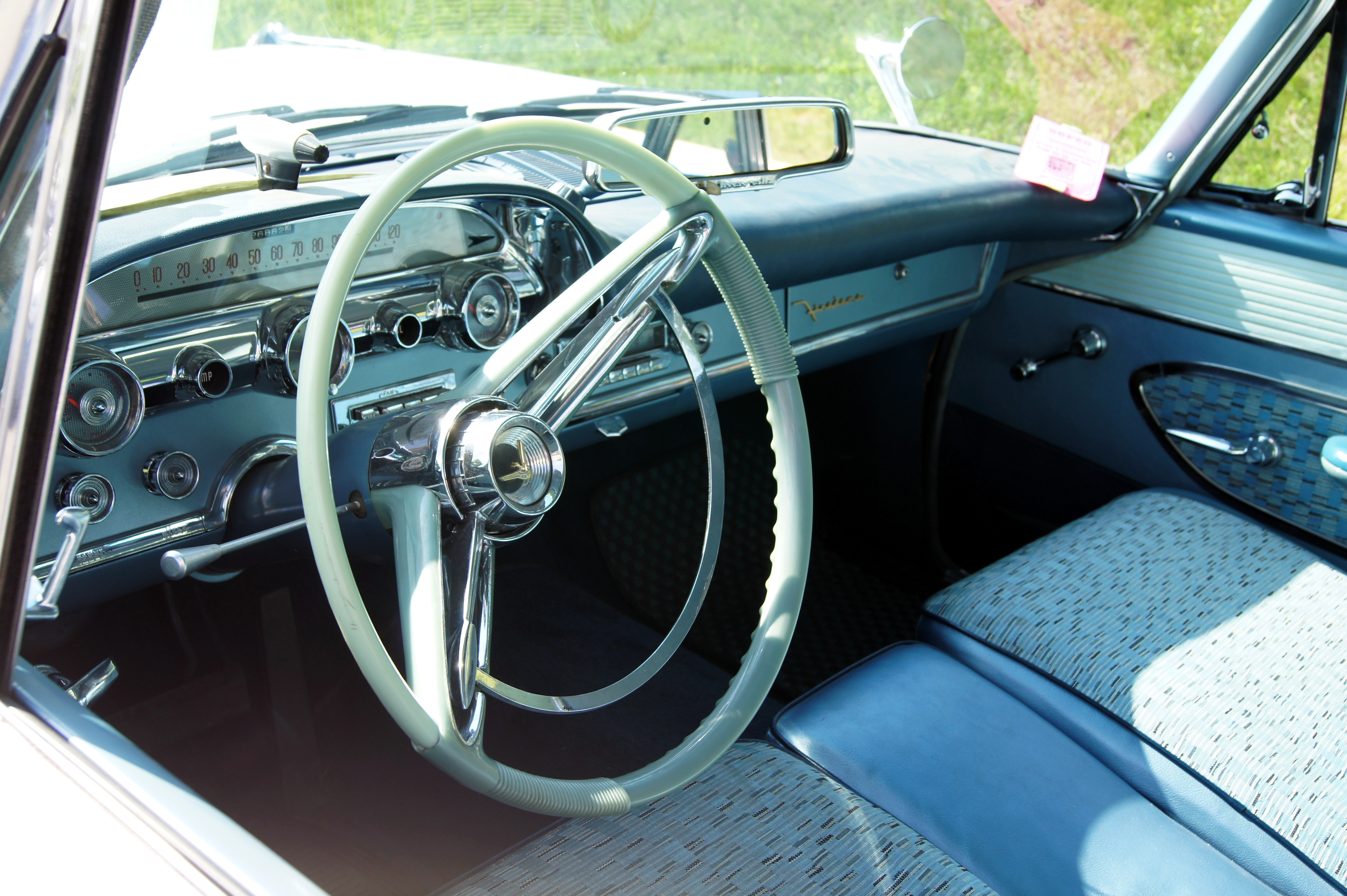
1959 DeSoto Firedome interior
