= DeSoto Fireflite =

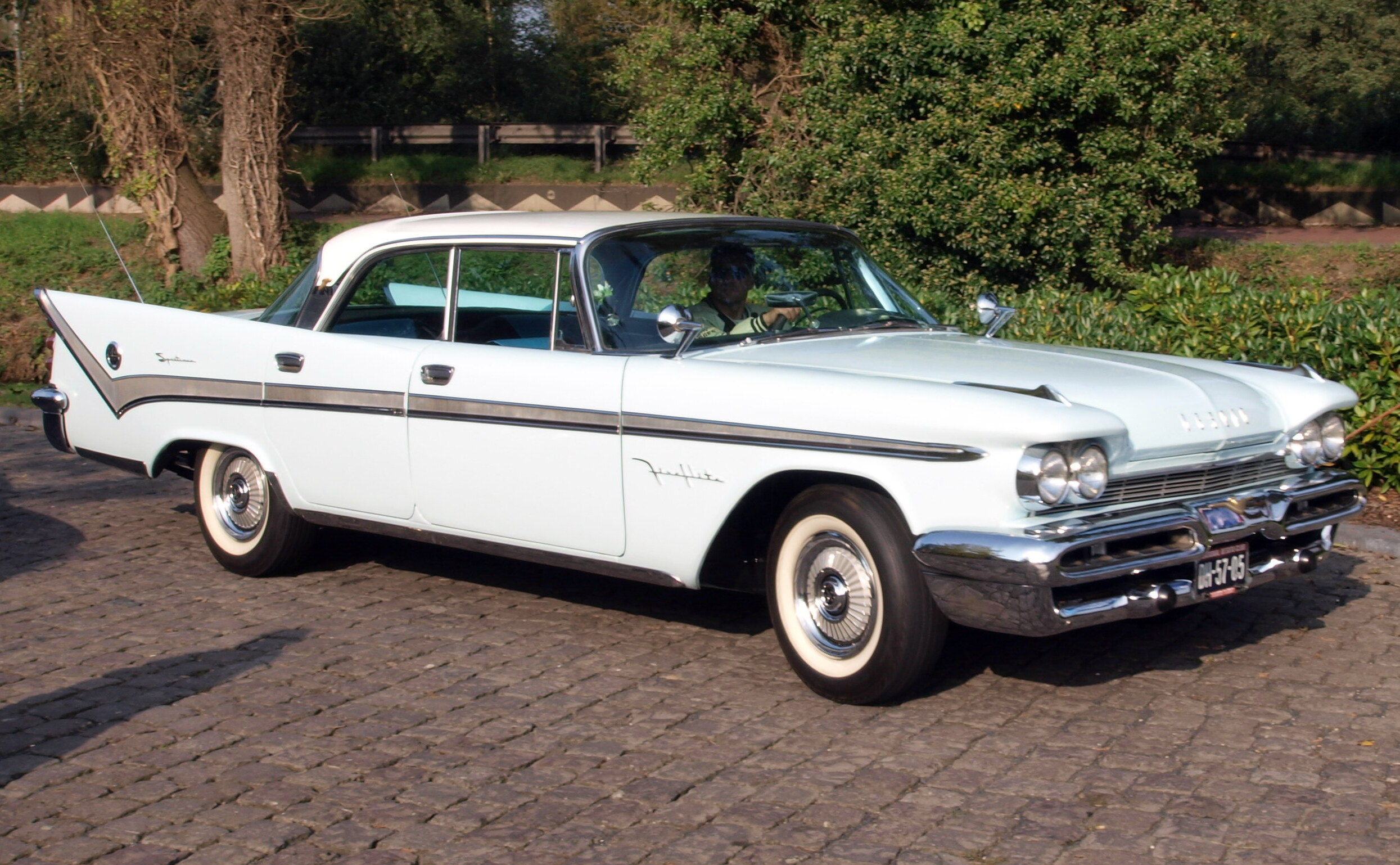
- 1959 DeSoto Fireflite 4-Door Sportsman

Overview
- Manufacturer: DeSoto (Chrysler)
- Model years: 1955–1960
- Assembly: Detroit, MI (Wyoming Ave) Assembly Los Angeles, CA (Maywood) Assembly

Body and chassis
- Body style: 2-door coupe 4-door sedan 4-door hardtop 2-door convertible 4-door station wagon
- Layout: FR layout
- Related: Chrysler Newport; Chrysler 300; DeSoto Firedome; DeSoto Adventurer; Dodge Coronet

Powertrain
- Engine: 325 cu in (5.3 L) V8; 330 cu in (5.4 L) V8; 341 cu in (5.6 L) V8

Dimensions
- Wheelbase: 126 in (3,200 mm)
- Length: 217.9 in (5,535 mm) (1955); 220.9 in (5,611 mm) (1956); 218 in (5,537 mm) (1957); 222.1 in (5,641 mm)(1959)
- Width: 77 in (1,956 mm) (1955); 78.2 in (1,986 mm) (1957)

Chronology
- Predecessor: DeSoto Series S-10

The DeSoto Fireflite is a full-size premium automobile which was produced by DeSoto in the United States from 1955 until 1960.

== Design ==
The Fireflite was introduced in 1955 as DeSoto's top trim package of the DeSoto Firedome. It was wider and longer than the Firedome, and came equipped with a hemispherical cylinder head, 291 cubic inch displacement (4.8L) V8 engine producing 200 hp when equipped with the 4-barrel carburetor (149 kW), and PowerFlite automatic transmission. The transmission was operated by a Flite-Control lever located on the dashboard. The car weighed 4,070 lb (1850 kg) and cost US$3,544 ($42,594 in 2025 US dollars). AM radio was a US$110 option ($1,322 in 2025 US dollars).

The 1956 model car was best known for its long, tapering tail fins, often accentuated by a two-tone exterior finish. The interior offered bench seating that could accommodate six passengers. The Fireflite had a 0 to 60 mph (97 km/h) acceleration time of 11 seconds and a top speed of 110 mph (175 km/h).

== Sales ==
The Fireflite's bold design increased sales for DeSoto. In 1955, DeSotos sold well with over 114,765 examples produced, making 1955 the best year for the company since 1946. By 1956, DeSoto placed eleventh in U.S. production with an annual production of 110,418 cars. The success was short-lived, however, and Chrysler discontinued the Fireflite models at the end of the 1960 model year, along with the DeSoto brand as a whole in November 1960.

== Indianapolis 500 pace car ==
In 1956, a gold and white Fireflite convertible was the Official Pace Car for the 1956 Indianapolis 500. While no official production figures for the pacesetter convertibles were ever released, research from National DeSoto Club members has narrowed it down to between 390 and 426 produced. Indianapolis 500 President Tony Hulman said the DeSoto was chosen unanimously by the track committee because it delivered "outstanding performance and had superb handling characteristics."

== Modifications and specifications ==
The 1956 Fireflite had a longer stroke, 3.80 inches, giving a 330 cubic inch displacement (5.4L). Compression ratio increased to 8.5:1 and power increased to 230 hp (172 kW). It made up 27.39% of DeSoto's sales in 1956. Power seats were US$70, while power brakes cost US$40.

The Fireflite's appearance for 1957 was redesigned with the help of Chrysler's head stylist, Virgil Exner. The design was bold and radical with large tail fins, dual oval exhaust, and triple-lens taillights.

A four-headlight system was optional for both the Fireflite and DeSoto Firedome models in 1957. The DeSoto Firesweep polyhead V8s were introduced with a bore and stroke of 3.6875 in (94 mm) X 3.800 in (97 mm). for 325 cid. The two-barrel V8 was rated at 240 hp (179 kW) while the four-barrel version produced 260 hp (194 kW).

The 330 cid hemi engine was replaced by a hemi which was 341 cid (5.6L). The two-barrel carburetor produced 270 hp (201 kW), while the four-barrel version was rated at 295 hp (220 kW). Both engines had a 9.25:1 compression ratio.

In 1957 the Fireflite was superseded by the Adventurer as the premium DeSoto model. Nevertheless, Fireflites continued to offer high-grade appointments in a full line of body styles. Also in 1957, a station wagon was added to the Fireflite's lineup. Back-up lights became standard.

In 1958, a new engine was added.

For 1959, the car was restyled. The electric clock became standard. A hand brake light was optional.

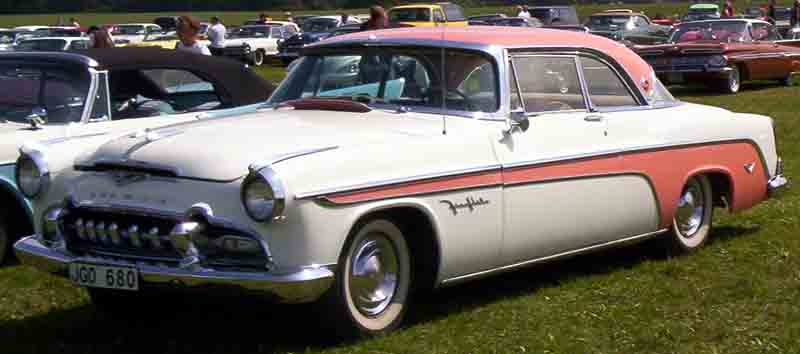
1955 DeSoto Fireflite Sportsman

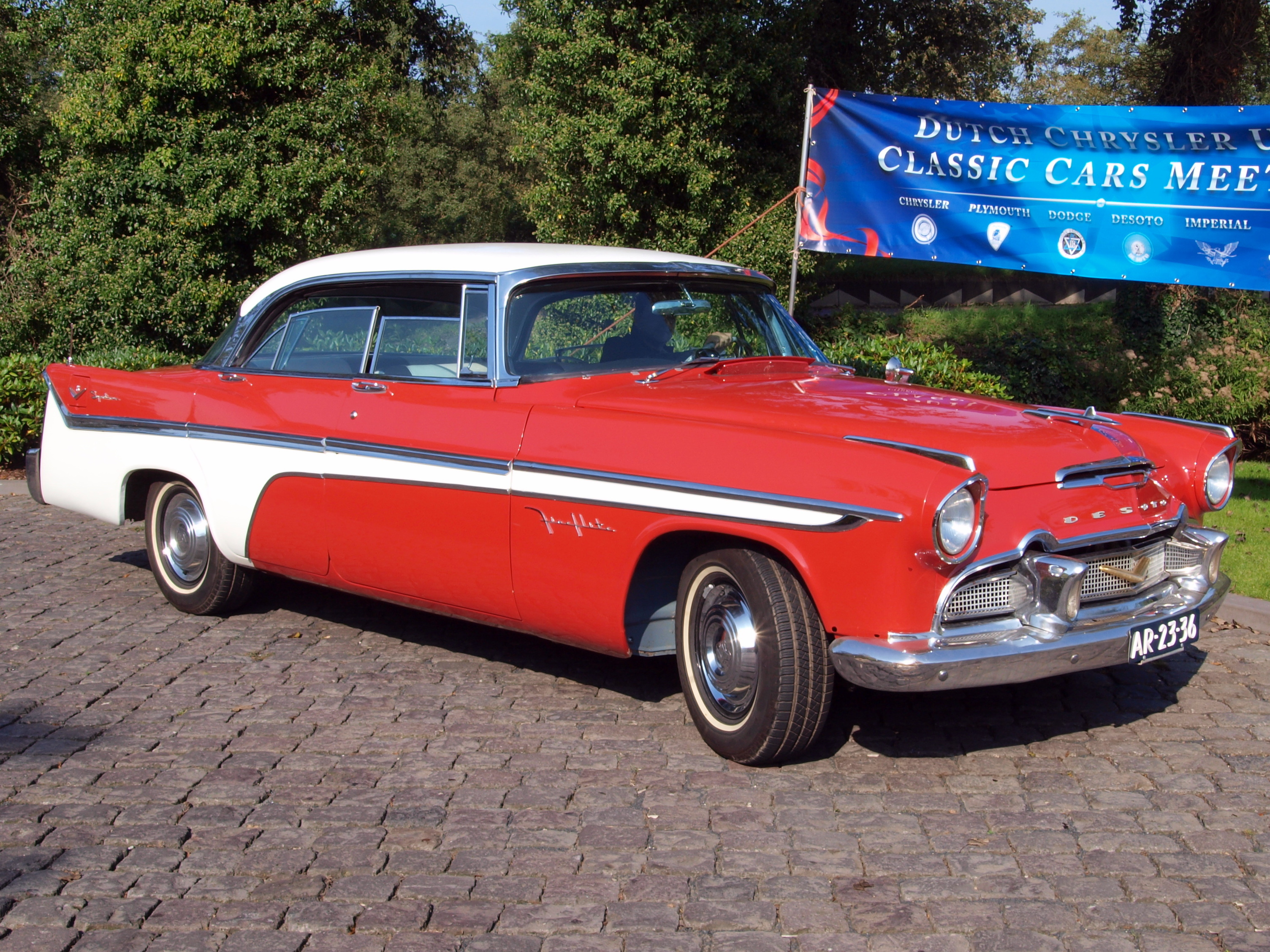
1956 DeSoto Fireflite Four-door Sportsman

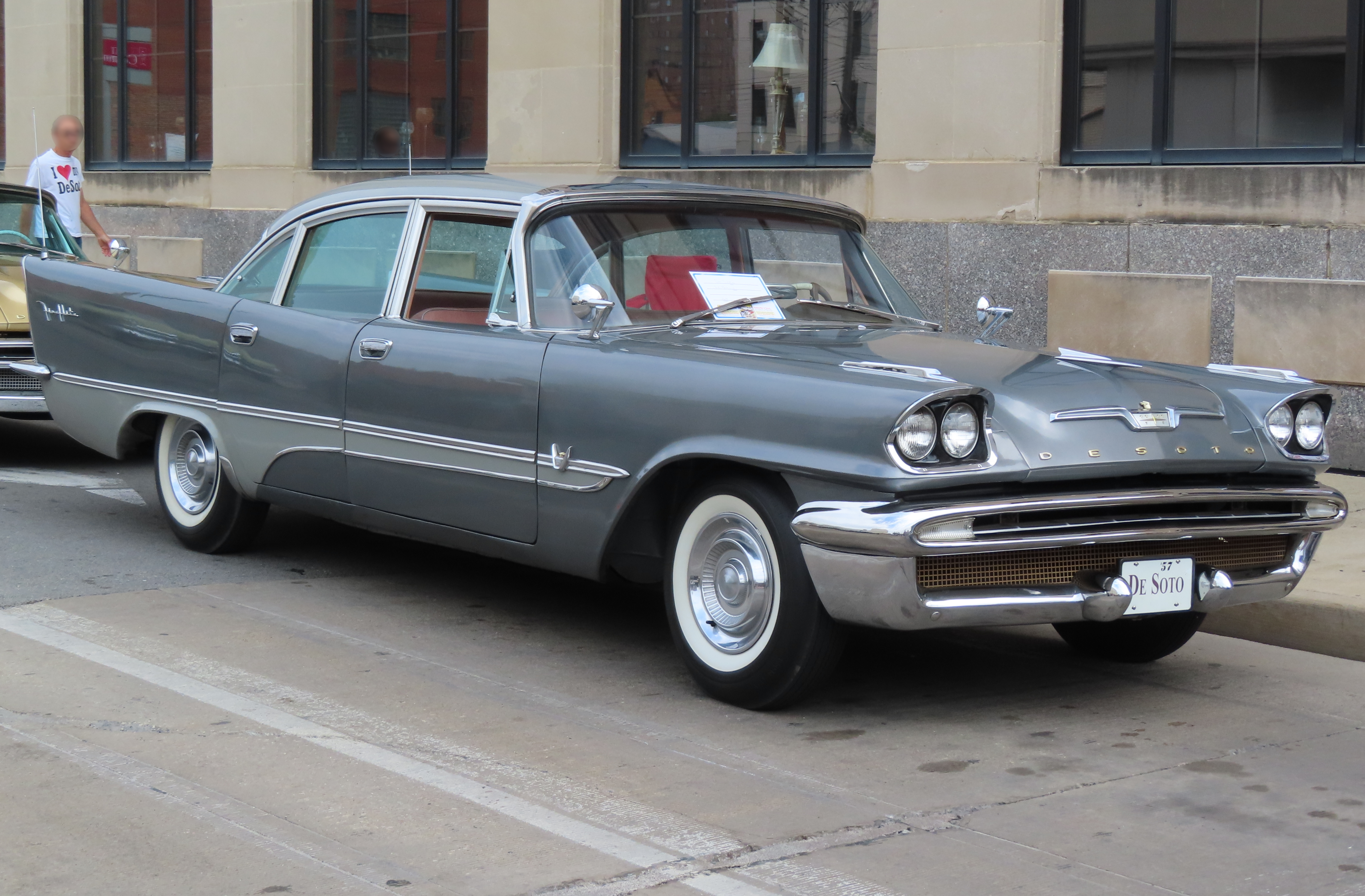
1957 DeSoto Fireflite 4-door sedan

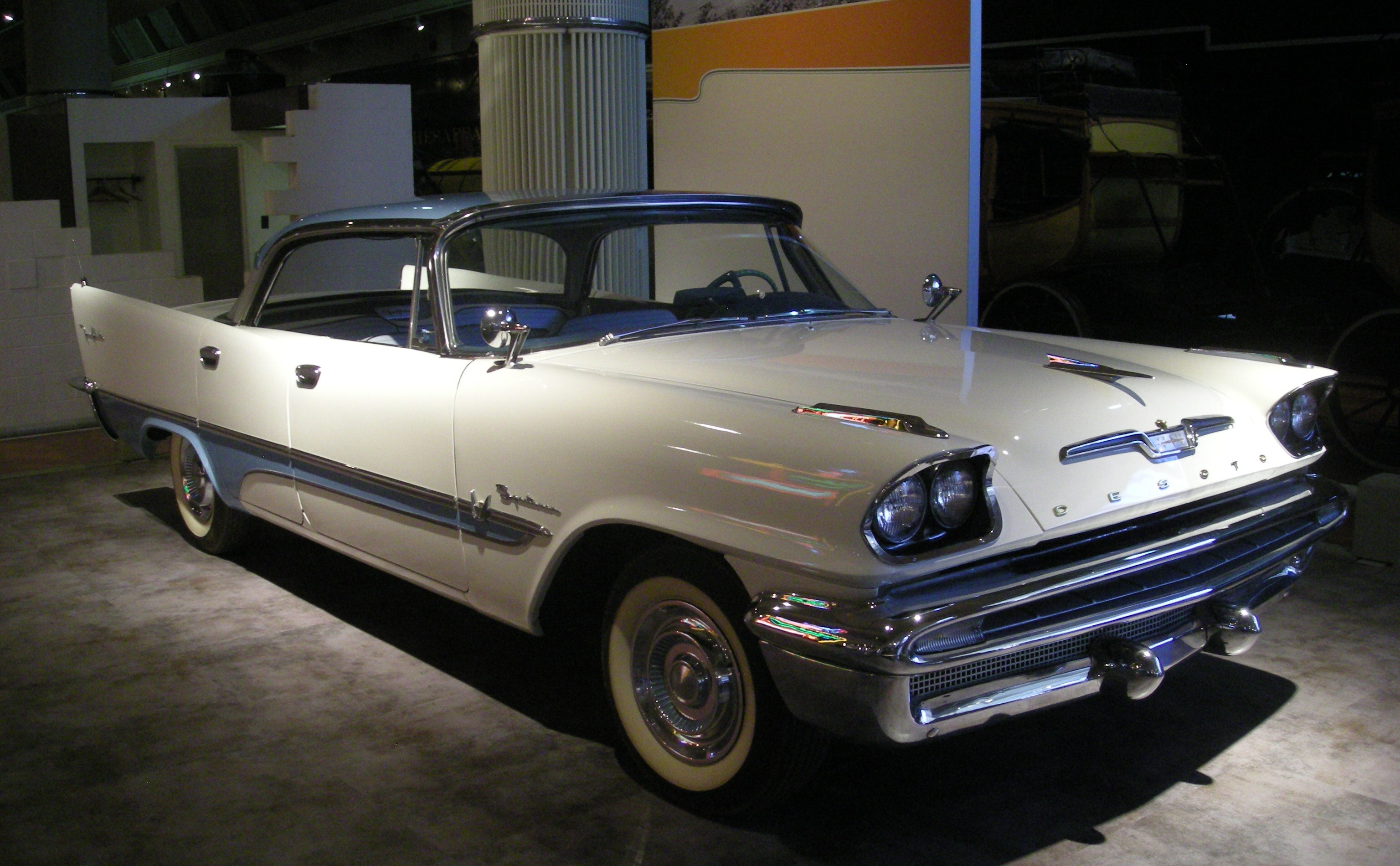
1957 DeSoto Fireflite 4-Door Sportsman

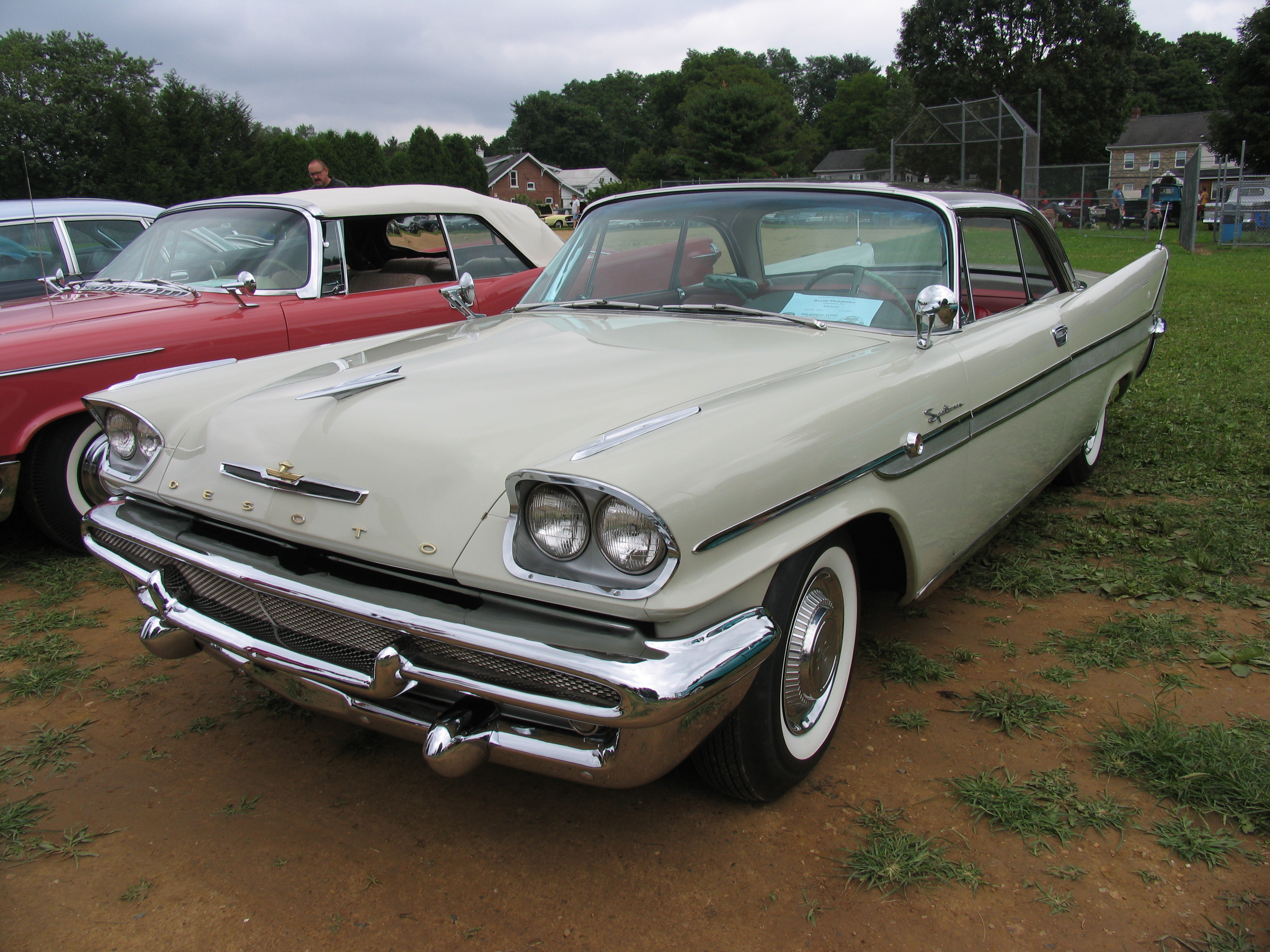
1958 DeSoto Fireflite 2 Door Sportsman

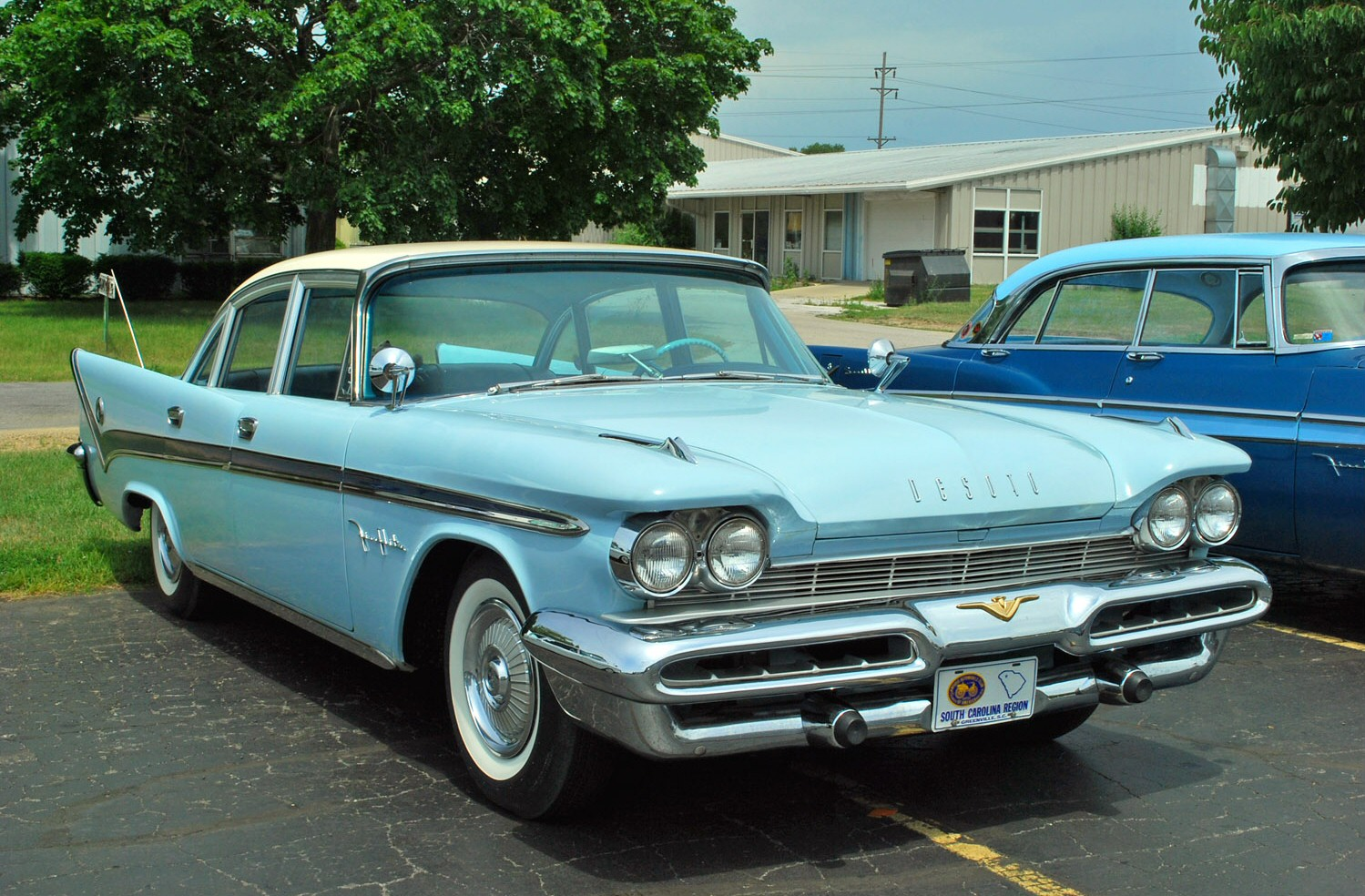
1959 DeSoto Fireflite 4-Door Sedan

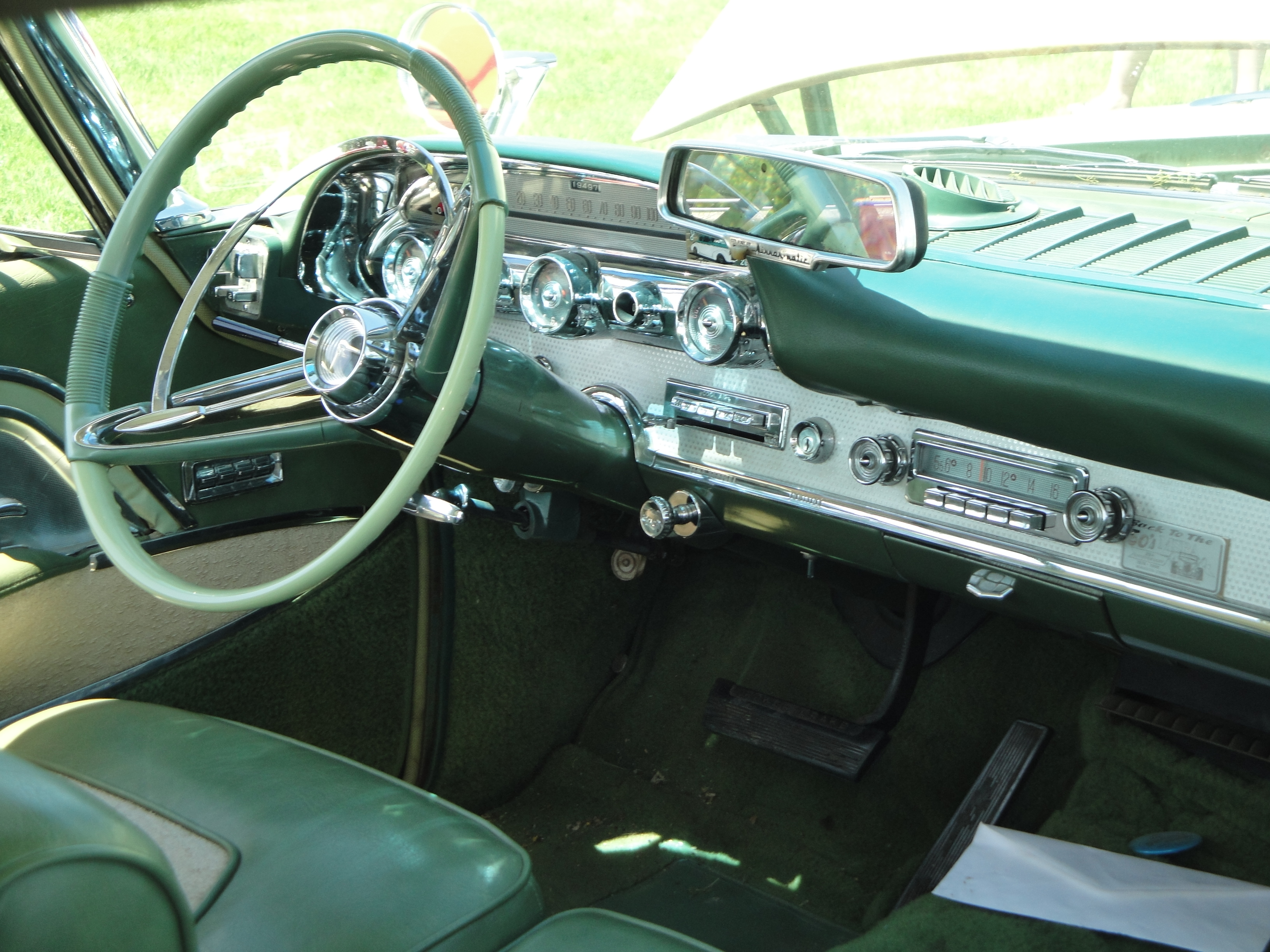
1959 DeSoto Fireflite interior

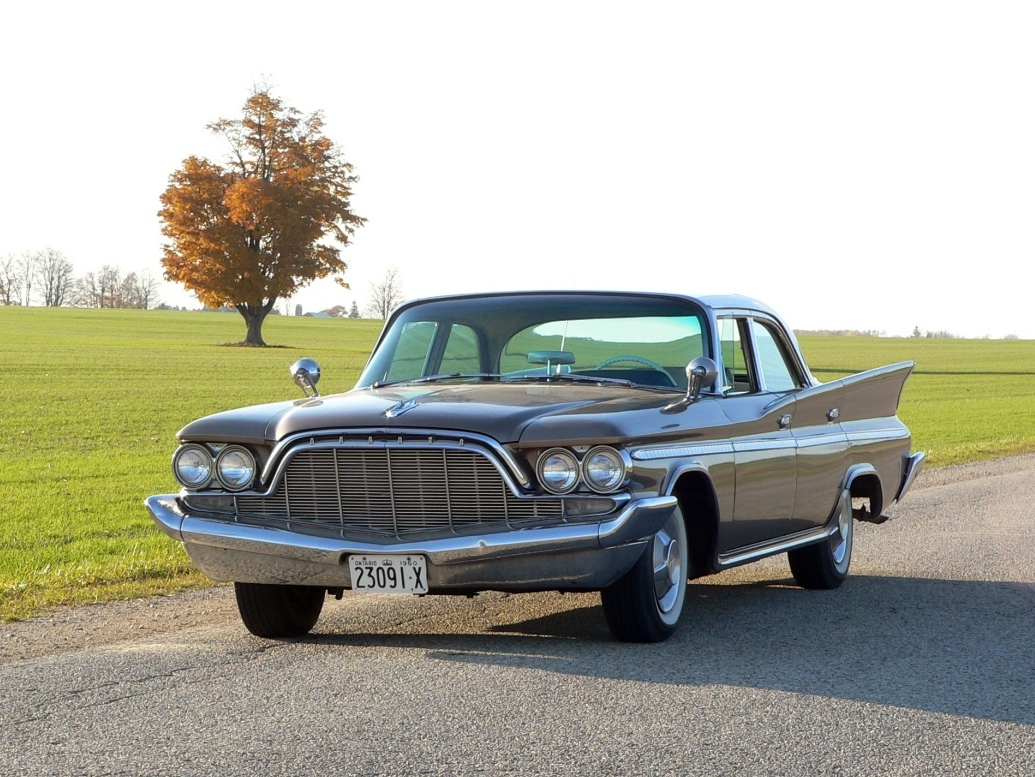
1960 DeSoto Fireflite 4-Door Sedan

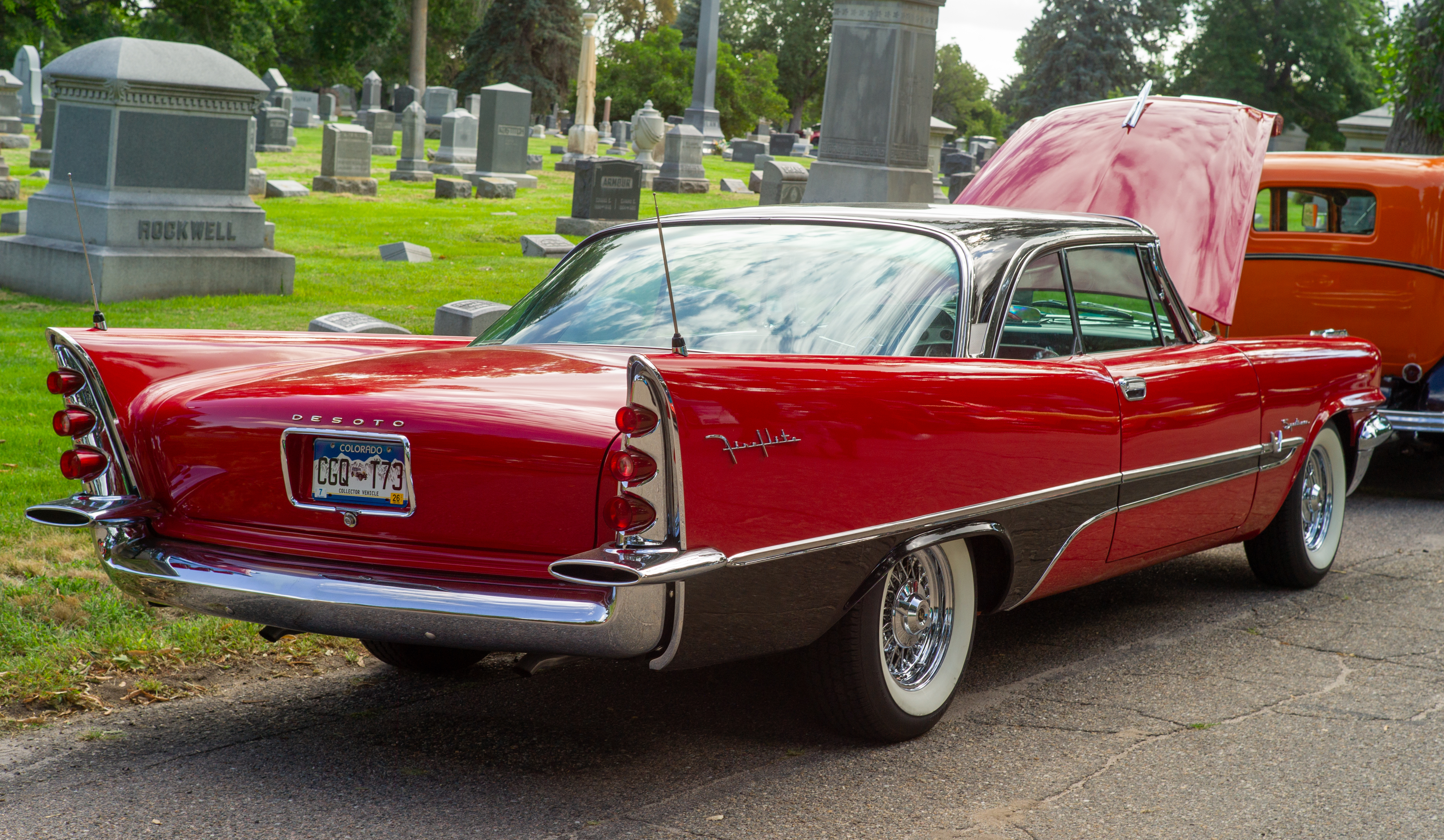
1957 Desoto Fireflite
