= DeSoto Adventurer =

Car model

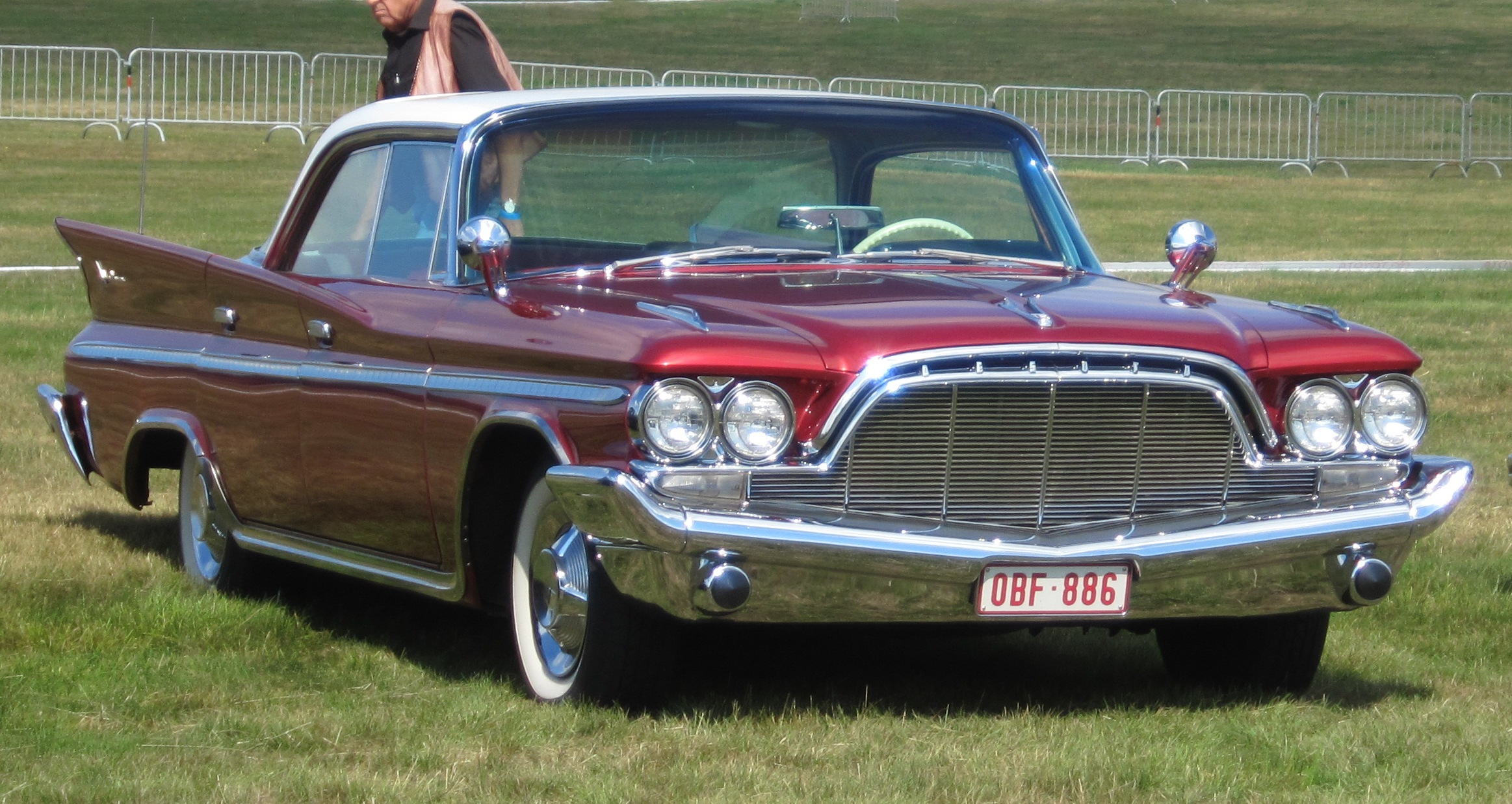
1960 DeSoto Adventurer

The DeSoto Adventurer is a full-sized automobile that was produced by DeSoto from 1956 through the 1960 model year. Introduced as a four-seat high-performance sports coupe concept car, the Adventurer ended up being DeSoto's special, limited-production, high-performance model, similar to the more luxurious and exclusive "letter series" Chrysler 300 and Chrysler Saratoga.

Initially offered only as a hardtop coupe, the Adventurer was DeSoto's top-trim level car, replacing the Custom. A convertible was added to the model range in 1957, and a four-door hardtop and sedan in its final year of 1960.

== 1956 ==
Introduced in 1956 as a sub-series of the top level DeSoto Fireflite series, the Adventurer was originally marketed as a limited production two-door hardtop, and available in a white/black/gold color scheme only. The first Adventurer came with a hi-output 341 cubic inch Hemi V8, dual exhausts and custom appointments and trim. Standard trim included dual outside side mirrors, gold wheel covers, radio, electric clock, padded instrument panel, windshield washers, full instrumentation, safety door locks, and heavy-duty suspension. A total of 996 cars were sold in its first year.

Specifications

- Wheelbase = 126 in (3,200 mm)
- Length = 220.9 in (5,611 mm)
- Width = 78.9 in (2,004 mm)
- Height = 60.3 in (1,532 mm)
- Leg-room-front = 45.7 in (1,161 mm)
- Transmission = PowerFlite automatic

== 1957 ==
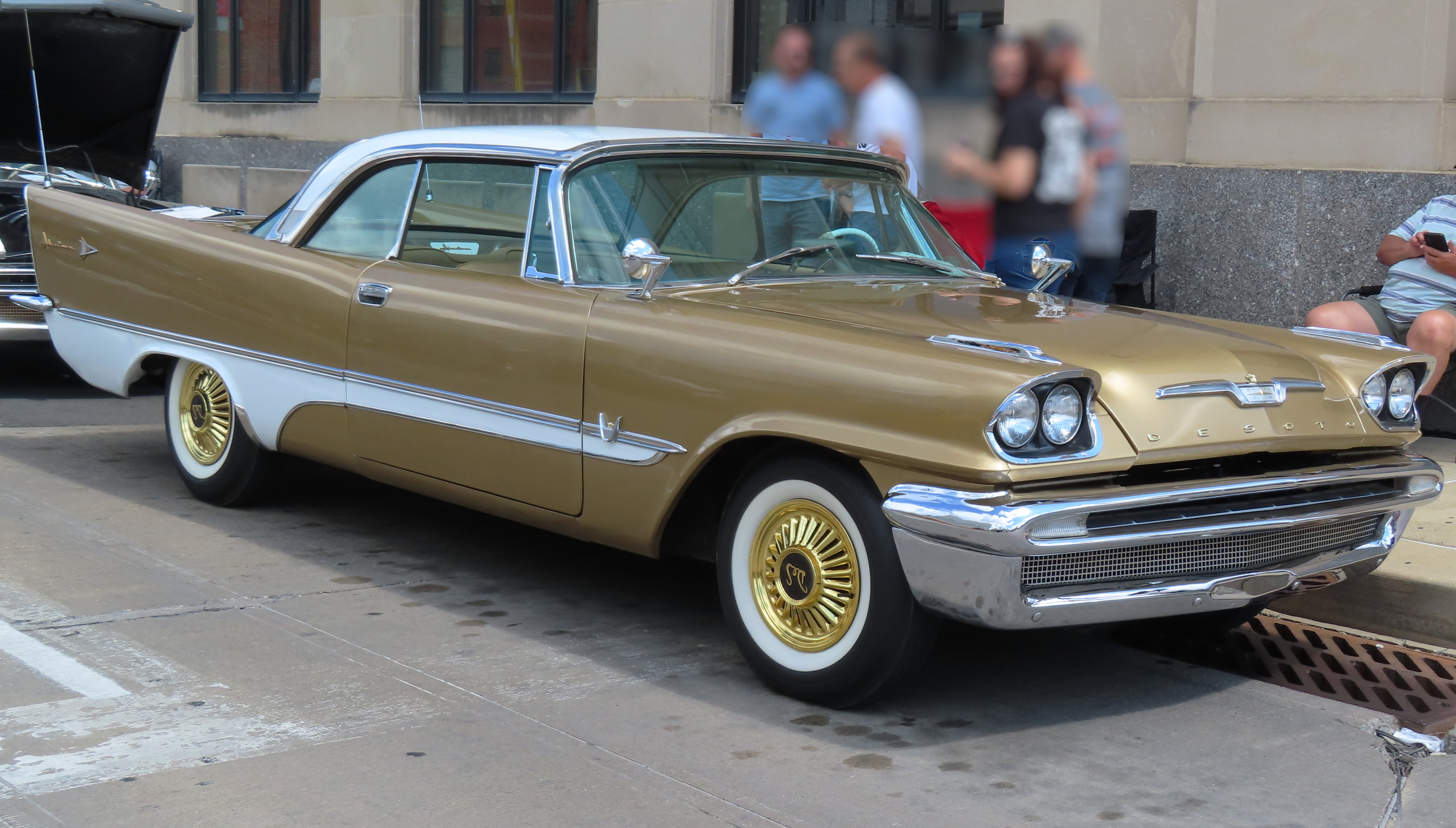
1957 DeSoto Adventurer Sportsman Coupe

For 1957, the Adventurer received Chrysler's forward look design along with other divisional cars. A convertible also joined the two-door hardtop, and again color choices were limited to the black-white and gold color theme. The car debuted in December 1956 as a hardtop, and to rave reviews, foremost among them was Mechanix Illustrated Automobile Editor Tom McCahill who proclaimed the DeSoto as being the best styled of all of Chrysler's makes for 1957. A convertible debuted in February 1957. Most Adventurers had dual headlights as a standard, which became available for DeSoto as an option mid-year.

Like the 1956 car, the 1957 Adventurer was powered by Chrysler's high output V8, which was now up four cubic inches to 345 bhp (257 kW). Equipped with dual four barrel carburetors, the engine developed one horsepower per cubic inch displacement. For 1957, 1,950 units were produced, including 300 convertibles.

== 1958 ==
The 1958 Adventurer was an update to the all-new styling that car received in 1957. Along with the annual trim changes, the car also received a new grille with a mesh insert, plus dual headlights with slightly revised openings. The cars debuted at the Chicago auto show in January 1958. The Hemi engine was no longer available, instead, a 361 cubic inch wedge head was used. DeSoto offered fuel injection (produced by Bendix Corporation), the units proved troublesome and were an expensive option so very few Adventurers were sold with them. Those not equipped with the unit received the dual-quad carburetors. The shortened model year, combined with the effects of the 1958 recession dropped Adventurer production down to 432 units, 350 hardtops and 82 convertibles, a 78 percent drop in sales compared to 1957. However DeSoto itself was in the midst of a sales free-fall, and all series production was off brand-wide.

== 1959 ==
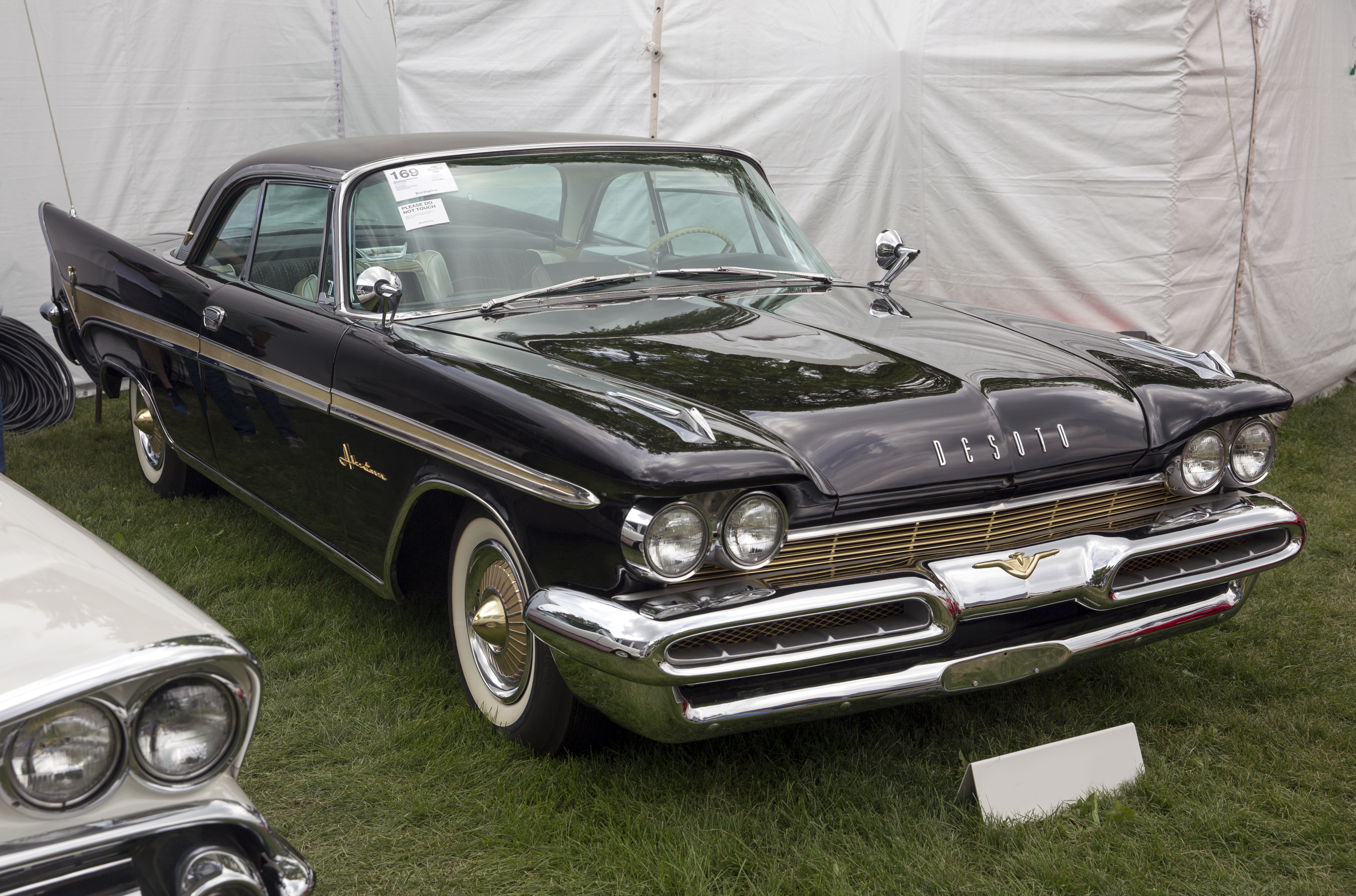
1959 DeSoto Adventurer

Restyled for 1959, the DeSoto's look began to take on more traits of the up-market Chrysler. The new model year was introduced in October 1958. The Adventurer again was limited in its color schemes, and came with the most standard features of any DeSoto automobile (though the radio became an option). The car was powered by the wedge head 383 V8, tuned to 350 bhp (261 kW) at 5,000 rpm 687 units, 590 hardtops and 97 convertibles, were produced for 1959, up from 1958, but not significantly enough to help stem the forty percent drop to DeSoto's divisional sales. New was the standard swivel out seats.

== 1960 ==
Promotional art advertising the 1960 DeSoto Adventurer four-door sedan, featuring Chrysler's patented swiveling front seats.

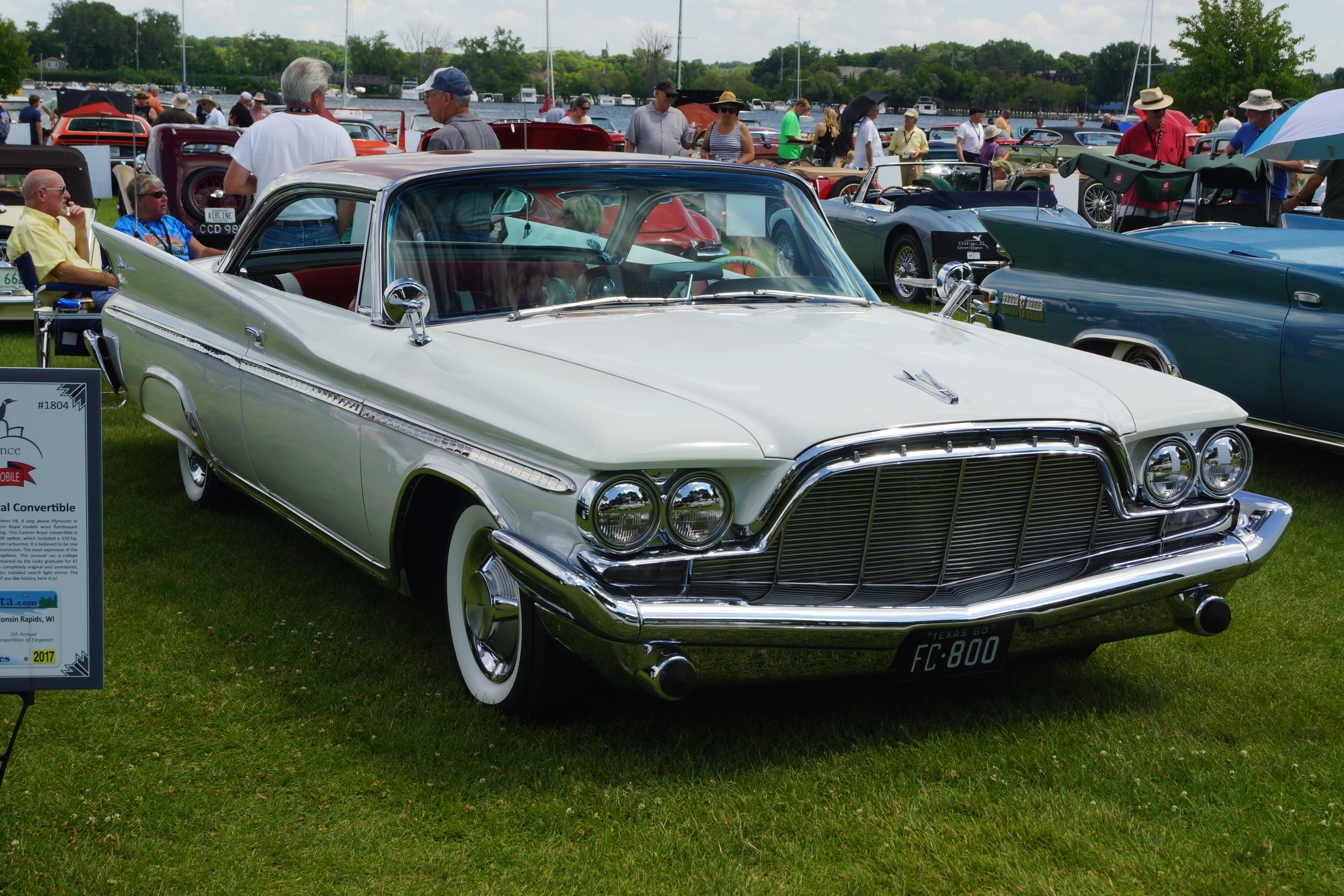
1960 DeSoto Adventurer 2-door hardtop

For its final year, the Adventurer lost its convertible but gained a four-door hardtop and sedan. Instead of being a limited-edition model, the Adventurer was the top trim model range for the two series DeSoto line-up for 1960. Ram induction was reintroduced on models with the quad-four carburetor. This was also the only year that the car came in a variety of colors instead of its traditional white-black and gold combination. Total sales for the Adventurer line posted its best effort with 11,597 models produced.

Rumors began circulating that Chrysler was ready to kill the DeSoto and customers reacted by buying other makes of cars. Also hurting DeSoto was its design, nearly identical to the Chrysler Windsor, except for the grille and the blade styled tail lights. Consumers purchased the Windsor without the fear that it would be an orphan like the DeSoto was soon bound to be. New was dual speed rear window defoggers, a drivers seat with five more inches added to the seat back, the Hiway Hifi that played RCA Victor 45 rpm records, and Unibody construction.

In Desoto's final year of 1961, dealers would offer a single car line, available in two body styles. Chrysler announced the end of the DeSoto in November 1960, with production lasting just long enough to deplete supplies of DeSoto trim on hand.

== Cultural references ==
A 1956 DeSoto Firedome Sportsman was driven by James Stewart's character Scottie in the 1958 film Vertigo.

The eponymous characters of the Sam & Max franchise traditionally drive a black-and-white 1960 DeSoto Adventurer hard-top squad car. Some video games in the franchise have instead featured an open-top model to better accommodate gameplay.
