= Chrysler B platform =

Automotive chassis design

The B platform or B-body was the name of two of Chrysler's midsize passenger car platforms – at first front-engine, rear-wheel drive, from 1962 through 1979; and the later, unrelated front-wheel drive platform, used by the Eagle Premier / Dodge Monaco, from 1988 through 1992.

The 1962-1979 platform underwent significant changes through its production life, but each Chrysler B-platform car in a given model year shared the same chassis, with only styling differences between the Dodge and Plymouth models. The cars were otherwise mechanically identical. Similarly, the 1988-1992 Premier and Monaco models differed only by styling and shared the same front-wheel drive B-body platform.

The Plymouth B-body series ultimately comprised four cars with nearly identical outward appearances (differing only in trim package, drive train and accessories). These were the Belvedere, Satellite, GTX and Road Runner. The 1970 Superbird was a Road Runner with an extended nose cone and front fenders borrowed from the Dodge Coronet, a revised rear window, and a high-mounted rear wing. The Superbird's unique styling was a result of homologation requirements for using the same aerodynamic nose and rear wing when racing the car in the NASCAR series of the time. While the aerodynamic concept used to create the Superbird was identical to that of the 1969 Dodge Charger Daytona, they shared no common body components. The Superbird was produced only during the 1970 model year.

In NASCAR competition, the Superbird was successful with Pete Hamilton driving for Petty Enterprises winning the 1970 Daytona 500 using a Superbird. However, NASCAR effectively hobbled the low production winged cars after 1970 with strict regulations that limited the size of engines that could power them. This rendered them uncompetitive.

There was more diversity in the outward appearance of the Dodge B-body series. The Dodge models based on the B-body were the Coronet, Super Bee and the Charger. The 1969 Charger Daytona was a Charger with an extended nose and high-mounted rear wing, offered for the same reasons as the Superbird. The Charger Daytona was produced only during the 1969 model year.

== 1962–1979 ==
Cars using the rear-wheel-drive B platform include:

- 1962 Dodge Dart
- 1962–1964 Dodge Polara
- 1962–1964 Plymouth Fury
- 1962–1964 Plymouth Savoy
- 1962–1970 Plymouth Belvedere
- 1963–1964 Dodge 220 (Canadian)
- 1963–1964 Dodge 330
- 1963–1964 Dodge 440
- 1965–1974 Plymouth Satellite
- 1965–1976 Dodge Coronet
- 1966–1978 Dodge Charger
- 1967–1971 Plymouth GTX
- 1968–1975 Plymouth Road Runner
- 1975–1978 Plymouth Fury
- 1975–1979 Chrysler Cordoba
- 1977–1978 Dodge Monaco
- 1978–1979 Dodge Magnum
- 1979 Chrysler 300

Five different wheelbases were available:

- 116 inches (2,946 mm)
  - 1962 Dodge Dart
  - 1962–1964 Dodge Polara
  - 1962–1966 Plymouth wagons
  - 1962–1970 Plymouths (except wagons)
  - 1963–1964 Dodge 220/330/440
- 115 inches (2,921 mm)
  - 1971–1979 2-door models
  - 1975–1979 Chrysler Cordoba
- 117 inches (2,972 mm)
  - 1965–1970 Dodges
  - 1967–1974 Plymouth wagons
  - 1971–1974 Plymouth 4 doors
- 117.5 inches (2,984 mm)
  - 1975–1978 Plymouth and Dodge 4 doors and wagons
- 118 inches (2,997 mm)
  - 1971–1974 Dodge

== 1988–1992 ==
From 1988 to 1992, the B-body name was used again for the midsize front-wheel-drive Eagle Premier sedan, which was originally designed by and was slated to be built by American Motors with Renault until Chrysler's buyout of that company in March 1987. The Premier was later joined by the similar Dodge Monaco for 1990.

=== Models ===
- 1988–1992 Eagle Premier
- 1990–1992 Dodge Monaco

== See also ==
- Chrysler platforms
