= Dodge Phoenix (disambiguation) =

Dodge Phoenix can refer to:

- Dodge Dart Phoenix, an automobile built by the Dodge division of the Chrysler Corporation from 1960 to 1961 in North America
- Dodge Phoenix, an automobile which was produced by Chrysler Australia from 1960 to 1973
