= Dodge Charger Daytona =

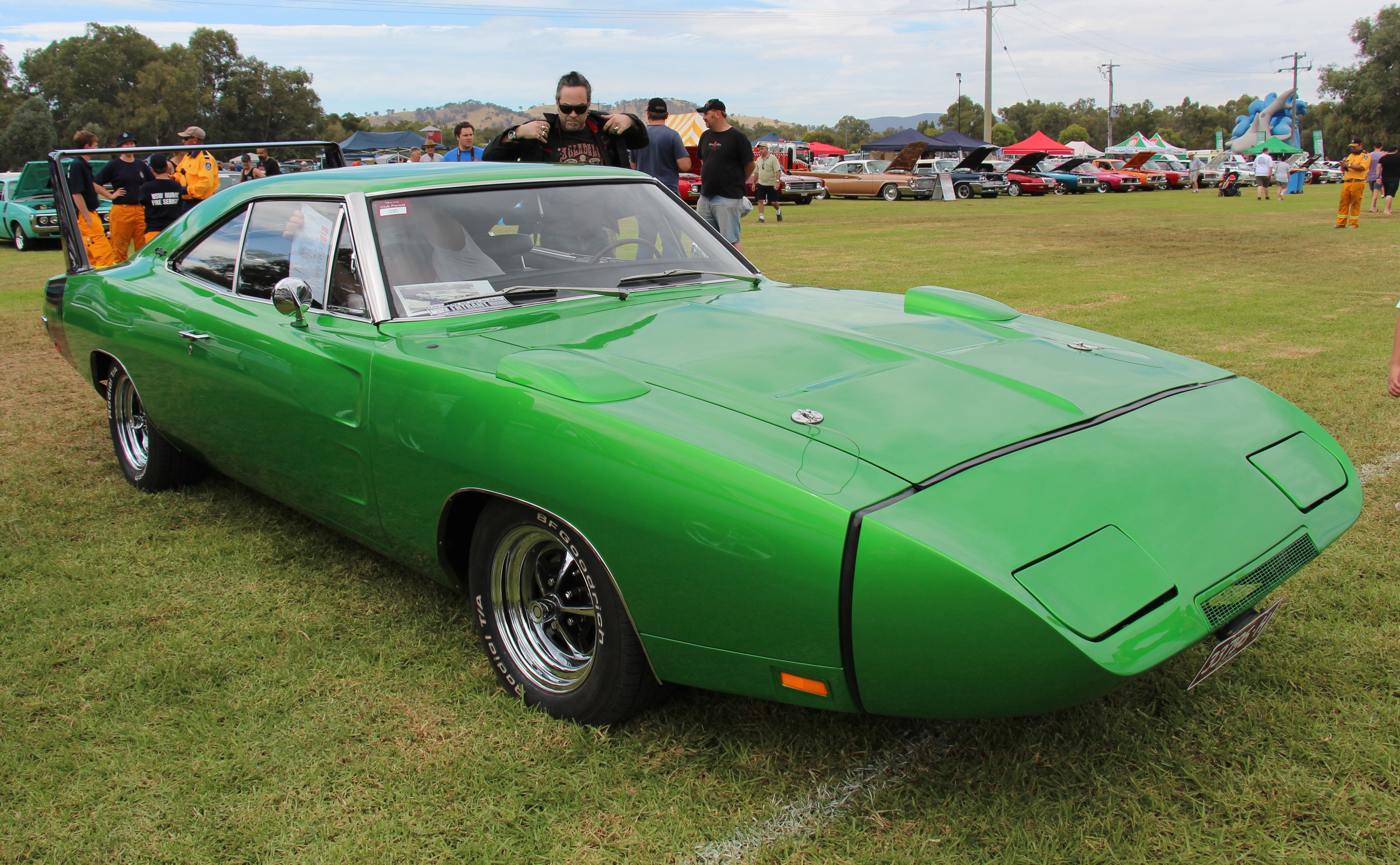
- 1969 Dodge Charger Daytona

Overview
- Manufacturer: Dodge (Chrysler)
- Production: 1969–1970; 2006–2009; 2013; 2017–2023

Body and chassis
- Class: Muscle car
- Layout: FR layout

Dodge produced three separate models with the name Dodge Charger Daytona, all of which were modified Dodge Chargers. The name was taken from Daytona Beach, Florida, which was an early center for auto racing and still hosts the Daytona 500, NASCAR's premier event. The original Dodge Charger Daytona was designed to beat the competition in NASCAR racing. It was the first NASCAR vehicle to reach 200 miles per hour, which was a major milestone at the time.

== First generation (1969) ==
First generation (B)
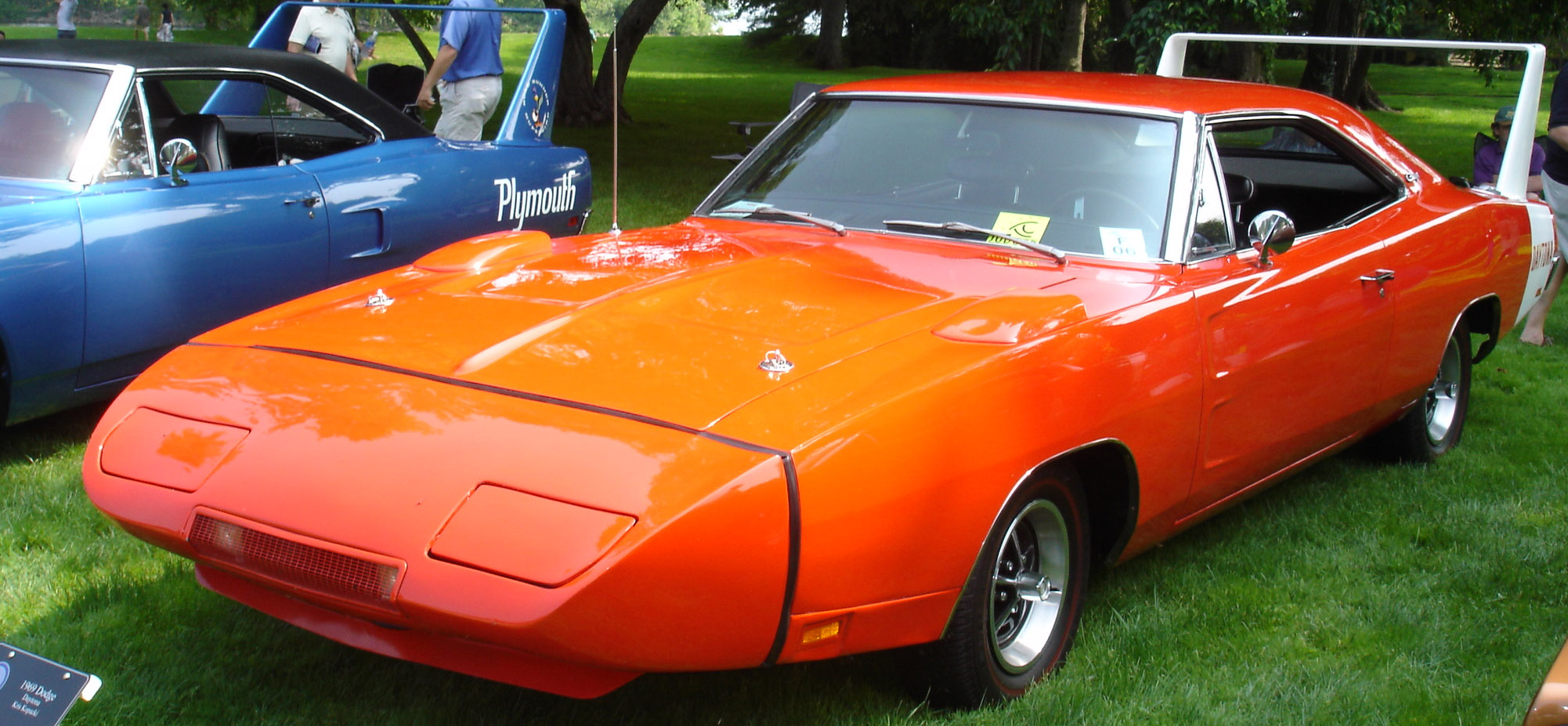

Overview
- Production: 1969
- Assembly: United States: Detroit, Michigan (Lynch Road Assembly)
- Designer: Bob Marcell, Gary Romberg, John Pointer

Body and chassis
- Class: Muscle car Race car
- Body style: 2-door coupe
- Platform: Chrysler B platform
- Related: Dodge Charger 500; Plymouth Superbird

Powertrain
- Engine: 426 cu in (7.0 L) Hemi V8; 440 cu in (7.2 L) Magnum V8
- Power output: 390 hp (291 kW), 425 hp (317 kW) and 490 lb⋅ft (664 N⋅m) of torque
- Transmission: 4 -speed manual 3-speed automatic Torqueflite 727

Dimensions
- Wheelbase: 117 in (2,972 mm)
- Length: 226.5 in (5,753 mm)

With the racing failure of the previous limited edition 1968 Dodge Charger 500 in NASCAR and Plymouth's superstar Richard Petty leaving them for Ford, the 1969 Dodge Charger Daytona was created. It was intended to be a high-performance, limited-edition version of the Dodge Charger produced in the summer of 1969 for the sole purpose of winning high-profile NASCAR races. It won its first race, the inaugural Talladega 500, in the fall, although the top names had left the track on Saturday in a boycott of the race. Buddy Baker, in the No. 88 Chrysler Engineering Dodge Charger Daytona, was the first driver in NASCAR history to break the 200 mph (322 km/h) mark, on March 24, 1970, at Talladega. The 1969 Dodge Daytona won two races in 1969 and another four in 1970, for a total of six. Its successor, the 1970 Plymouth Superbird, won eight races – all in 1970. Dodge Daytonas also won on the USAC and ARCA race circuits. They set numerous race and pole records.

One of the two famous aero-cars, the Dodge Daytona had featured special body modifications that included a 23-inch-tall (584 mm) stabilizer wing on the rear deck, a special sheet-metal "nose cone" that replaced the traditional upright front grille, a flush rear backlight (rear window area), a 'window cap' to cover the original Charger's recessed rear window, specific front fenders and hood that were modeled after the upcoming 1970 Charger, stainless steel A-pillar covers and fender mounted cooling scoops. The Daytona was built on the 1969 Charger's R/T trim specifications, meaning that it carried a heavy-duty suspension and brake setup and was equipped with a 440 cu in (7.2 L) Magnum engine as standard. Of special note to collectors is the optional 426 cu in (7.0 L) Hemi V8 engine, which only 70 of the 503 Daytonas carried. It had a corporate cousin in the "one year-only" 1970 Plymouth Superbird and with help of Chrysler's missile engineers, the Charger Daytona was born.

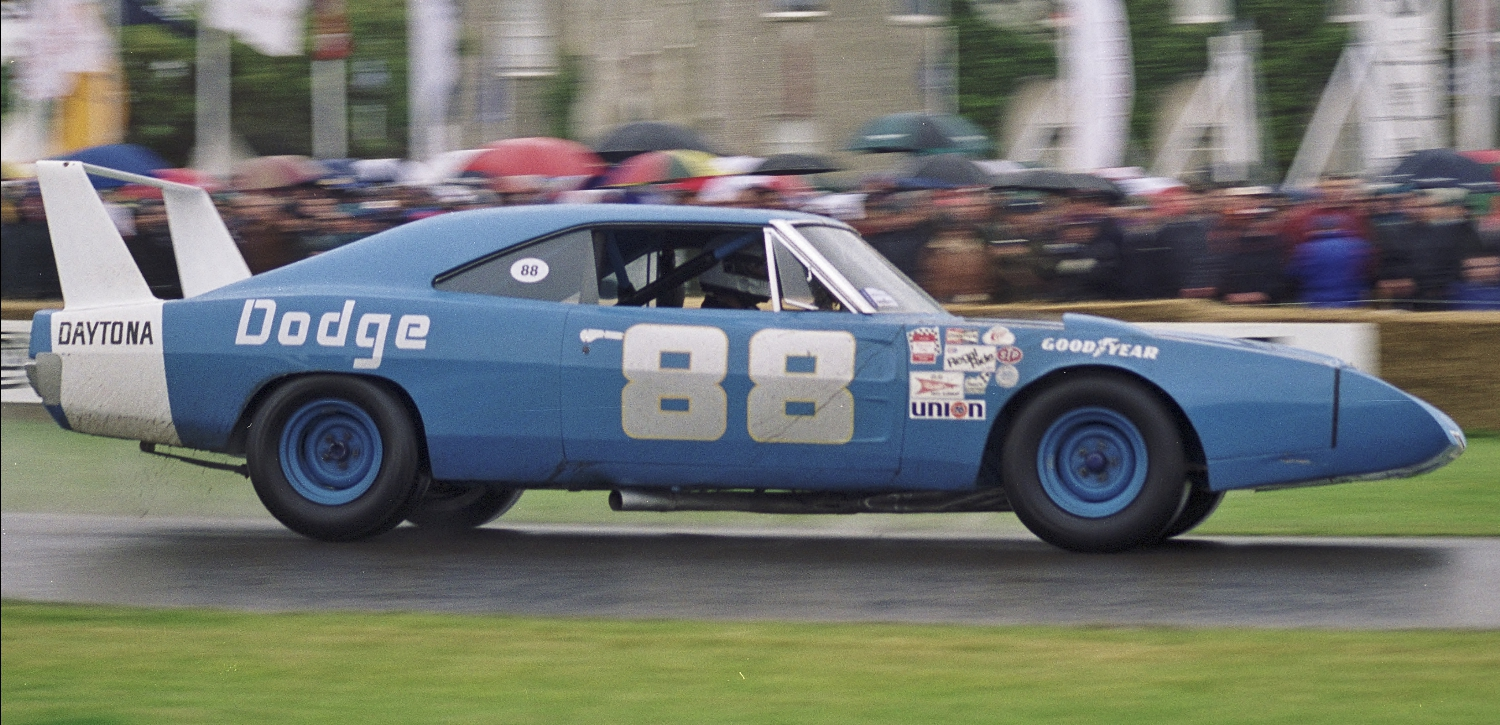
Re-creation of record-breaking #88 NASCAR Charger Daytona at the 1998 Goodwood Festival of Speed

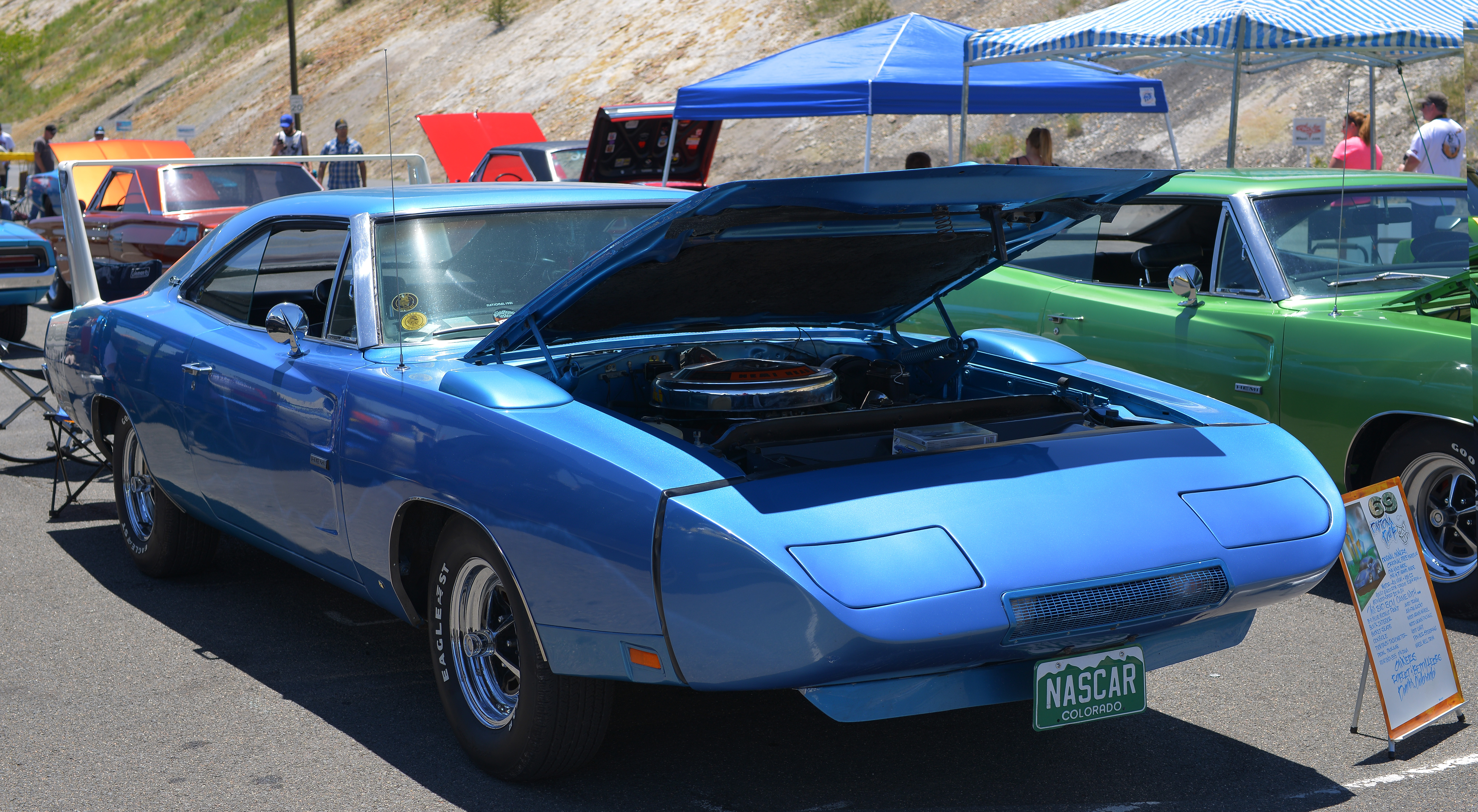
1969 Charger Daytona with Hemi Engine

The "Winged Warriors", as they were affectionately known, did not compete for long in NASCAR's top Grand National series. For the next season, executives banned aero specs on cars with engines larger than 305 cubic inches (i.e. the same five-liter limit imposed by the SCCA for the Trans-Am and internationally by the FIA for Group 5 sports cars). Because of their exceptional speed and performance, NASCAR subsequently changed the rule book, effectively banning all four of the Aero Cars from Dodge, Ford, Mercury, and Plymouth from competition by the end of 1970. The 1971 Daytona 500 had only one winged car, the #22 (called "mini motor,") which finished 7th.

The "Super Charger IV EL", which looked like a roadster prototype spin-off of the Charger Daytona minus the roof and spoiler, is seen as a pimp-mobile in the 1974 film Truck Turner. The car was actually a Charger show car, with a front end of a Daytona mounted onto it.

== 1975–1977 ==
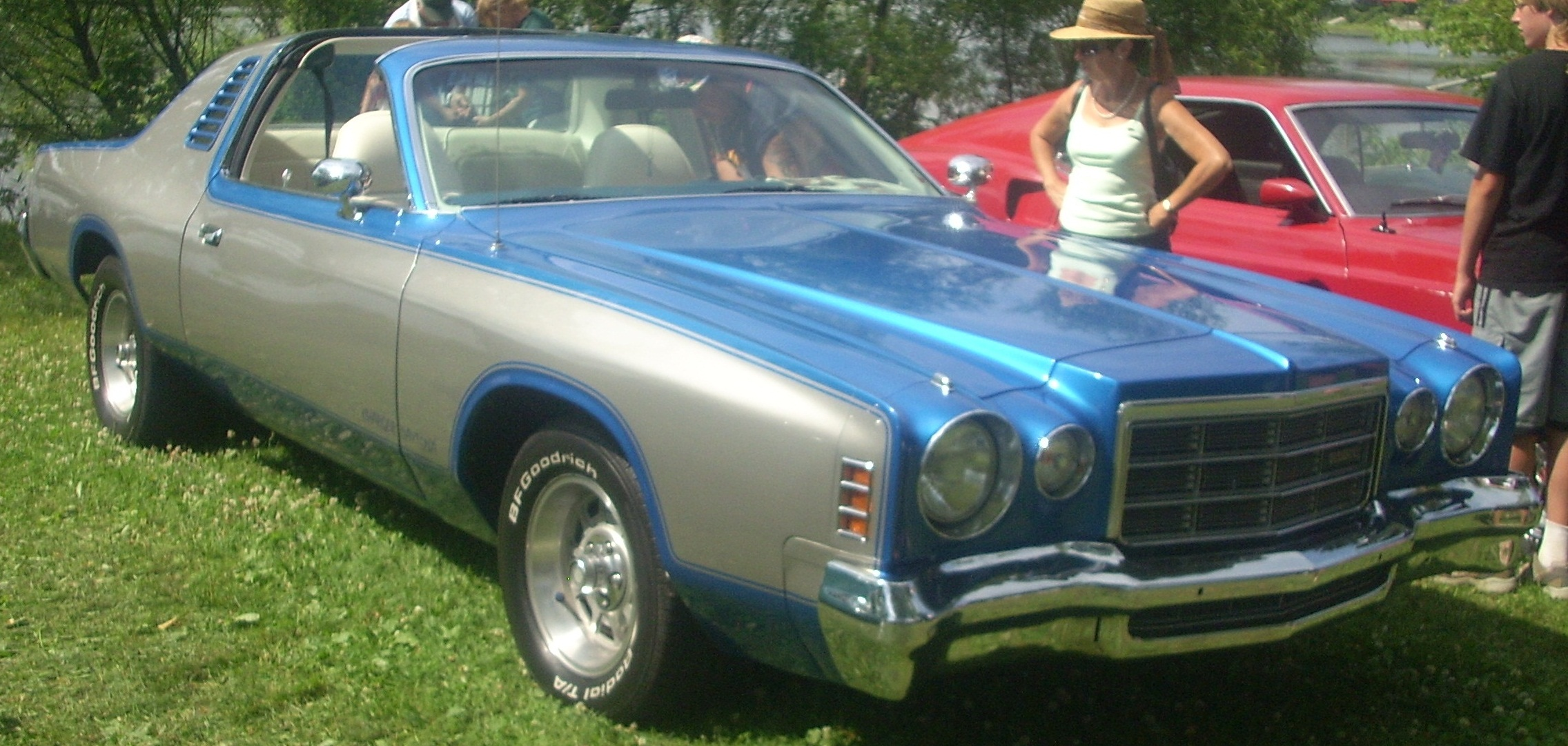
Mid-1970s Charger Daytona

For 1975–77, the Daytona name returned on the Charger, which by this time was a re-badged Chrysler Cordoba. The Daytona package of this era was a two-tone stripe-and-decal appearance package. A 400 cu in (6.6 L) big block engine could be ordered as the 318 was standard. In addition, some models (very few) were equipped with a tachometer. All Daytonas came with torsion bar heavy duty suspension.

== Second generation (2006–2009) ==
Second generation (LX)
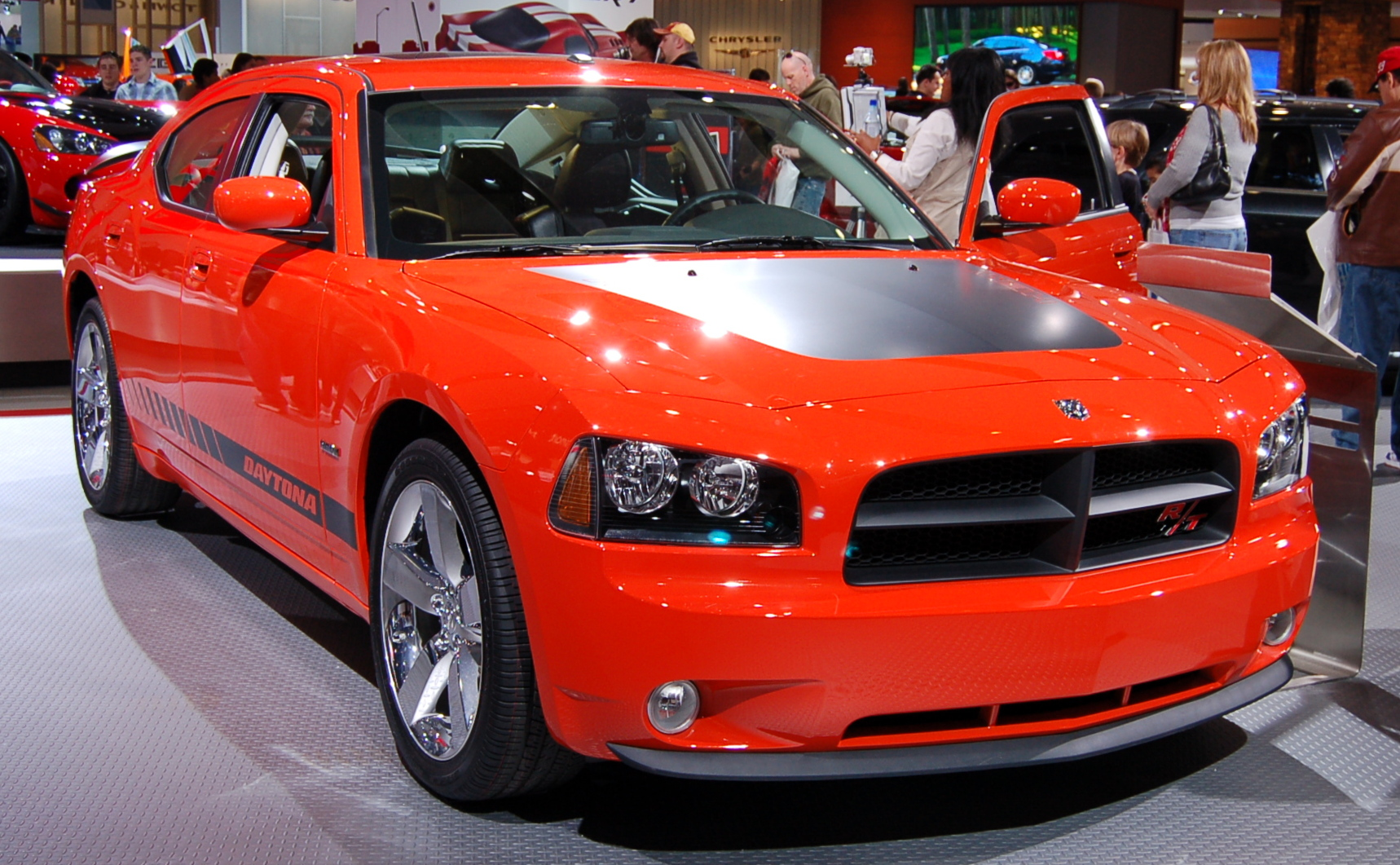

Overview
- Production: 2006–2009
- Assembly: Canada: Brampton, Ontario (Brampton Assembly)

Body and chassis
- Class: Full-size car
- Body style: 4-door sedan
- Platform: Chrysler LX platform
- Related: Chrysler 300C; Dodge Magnum R/T; Dodge Charger R/T; Dodge Challenger

Powertrain
- Engine: 5.7 L (345 CID) MDS Hemi V8 (2006–2008); 5.7 L (345 CID) EZD, VCT, Hemi V8 (2009)
- Transmission: 5-speed W5A580 automatic

Dimensions
- Wheelbase: 120 in (3,048 mm)
- Length: 200.1 in (5,083 mm)
- Width: 74.5 in (1,892 mm)
- Height: 58.2 in (1,478 mm)

The Dodge Charger was reintroduced for 2006 with a limited production Dodge Charger Daytona package that included a sportier interior, classic high-impact exterior colors, a rear spoiler, a front chin spoiler, a blacked out grille surround, rear quarter panel striping reading "DAYTONA" on either side, a blackout vinyl between the taillights on the decklid, and a black vinyl on the hood with the word "HEMI" cut out twice. Heritage R/T badges replaced the Stock R/T's chrome badges. A performance suspension with load-leveling rear shocks was also standard, as well as unique wheels. For 2006, the wheels were the stock R/T 18" wheels with charcoal grey painted pockets, and lower profile wider tires. The 2007 to 2009 wheels are 20" chrome clad wheels. In 2008, the rear quarter panel stripes were removed, and replaced with a strobe stripe on the lower portions of the doors that reads "DAYTONA" towards the front of the stripe. The hood decal was also modified. The 2006–2008 Daytona gains 10 hp (7 kW) over the standard Charger R/T via a freer flowing exhaust system featuring a single pass center muffler, and a larger diameter stock air cleaner giving it 350 hp. The car also had unique engine management software that removed the stock R/T speed limiter. The 2009 featured the new Variable Camshaft Timing HEMI, producing 368 hp (274 kW). These are the first Daytonas to wear a badge listing the number it was produced out of total production numbers.

Color	Year	Units
Go ManGo!	2006	4000 (US), 200 (CDN)
Top Banana	2006	4000 (US), 291 (CDN)
TorRed	2006	2000 (US), 200 (CDN)
Sublime	2007	1500 (US), 150 (CDN)
Plum Crazy	2007	1400 (US), 120 (CDN)
Hemi Orange	2008	1650 (US), 100 (CDN)
Stone White	2009	400 (US), 75 (CDN), 12 unnumbered (CDN)

== Third generation (2013) ==
Third generation (LD)
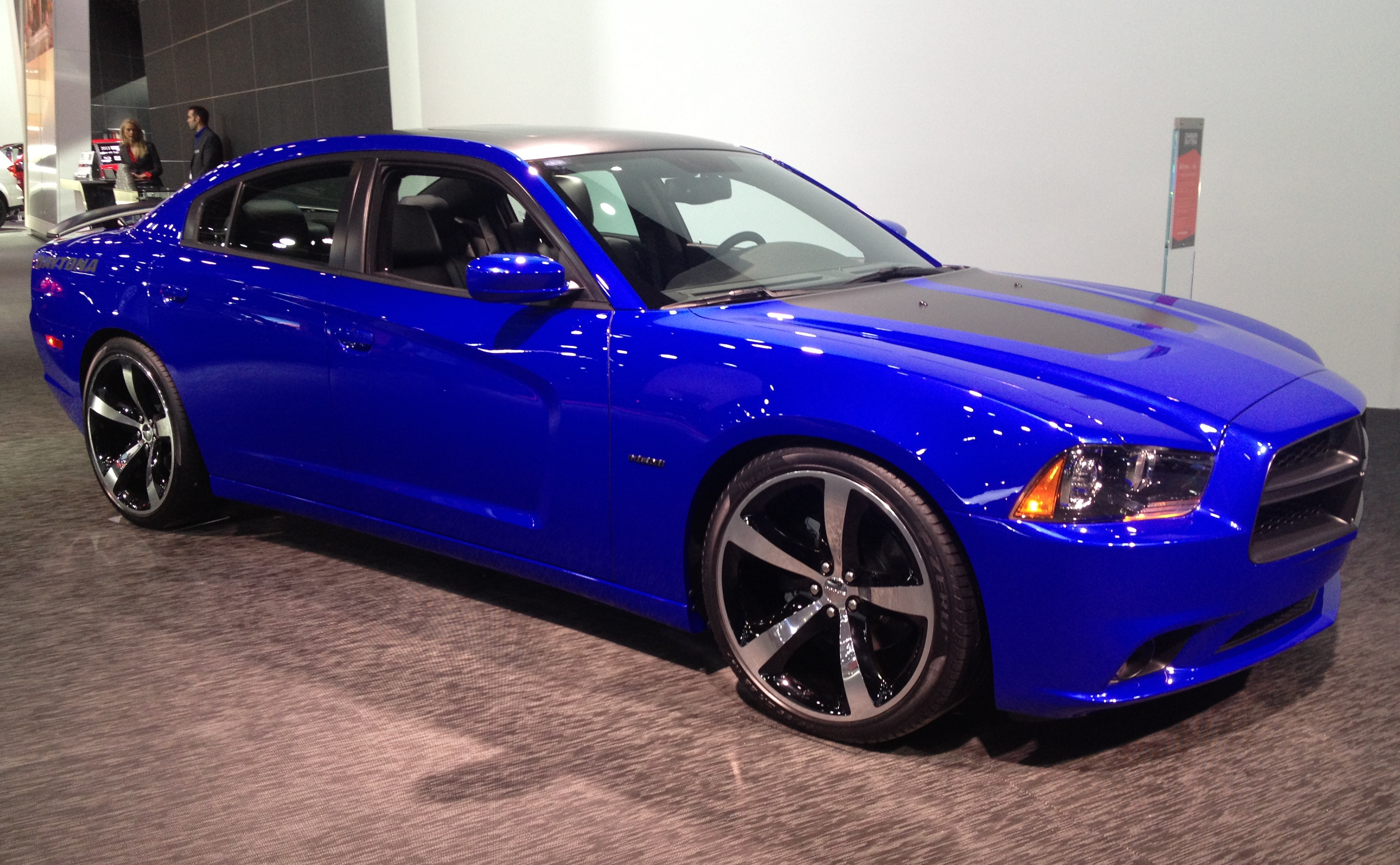
- Dodge Charger Daytona show car at the 2013 North American International Auto Show

Overview
- Production: 2013
- Assembly: Canada: Brampton, Ontario (Brampton Assembly)

Body and chassis
- Class: Full-size car
- Body style: 4-door sedan
- Platform: Chrysler LX platform
- Related: Chrysler 300C; Dodge Charger R/T; Dodge Challenger

Powertrain
- Engine: 5.7 L (345 CID) V8
- Transmission: 5-speed automatic with AutoStick

Dimensions
- Wheelbase: 120.2 in (3,053 mm)
- Length: 199.9 in (5,077 mm)
- Width: 75 in (1,905 mm)
- Height: 58.4 in (1,483 mm)

The 2013 Dodge Charger Daytona debuted at the 2012 Los Angeles International Auto Show. It was available in Charger R/T and Charger R/T Road & Track trim levels. Only 3,000 units of the Daytona were produced.

"With its 370-horsepower HEMI V-8, rear-wheel drive and iconic design, the 2013 Dodge Charger is a modern-day muscle car, and the new Dodge Charger Daytona takes it to a new level by paying homage to the historic 'Daytona' nameplate," said Reid Bigland, President and CEO, Dodge Brand.

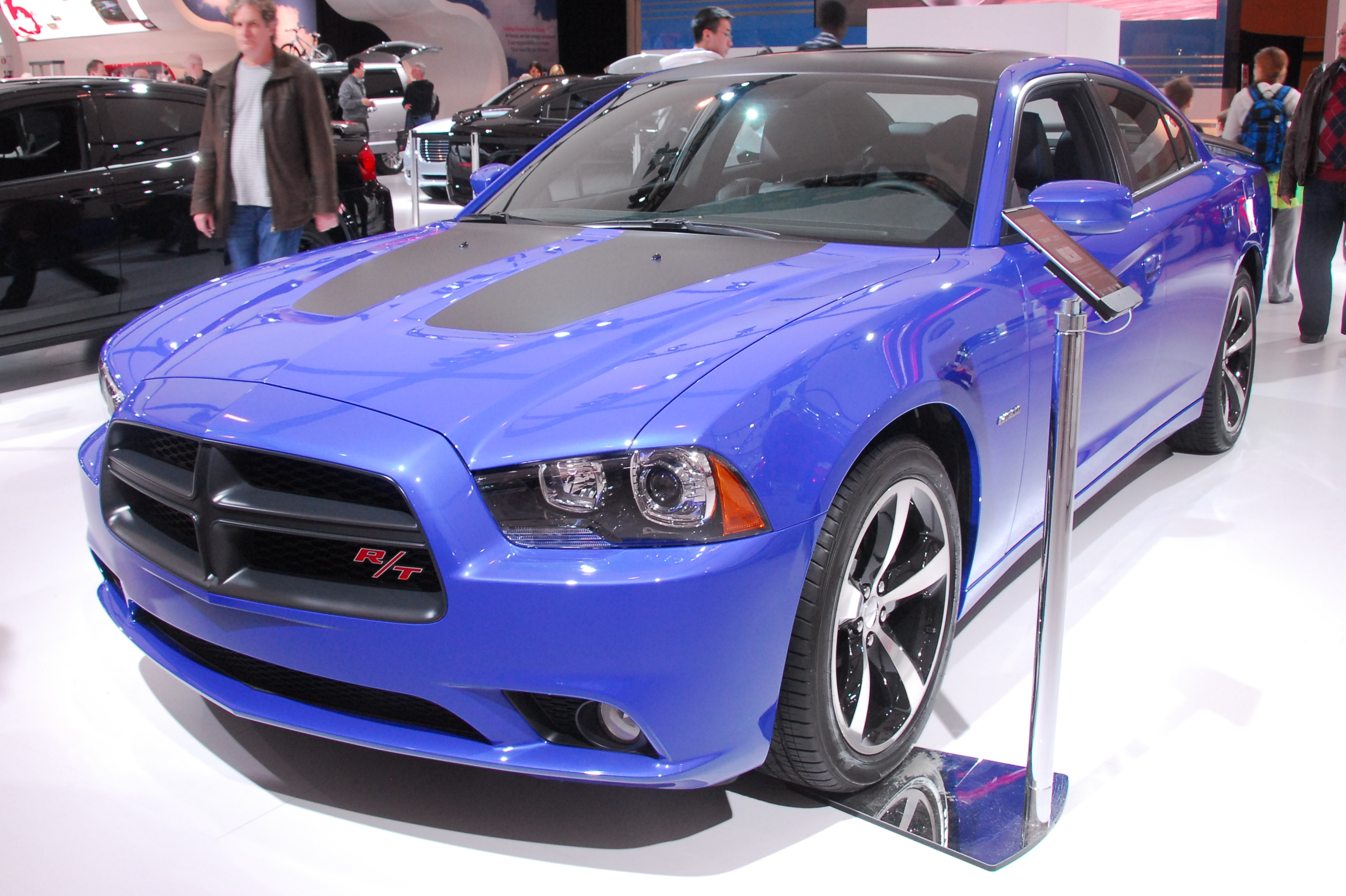
Dodge Charger Daytona at the 2013 Canadian International AutoShow

The Daytona was offered in Daytona Blue, Bright White, Billet Silver, and Pitch Black exterior colors. The Daytona package featured special dark trim that built upon the Charger's iconic muscle car design. Satin Black adorned the front crosshair grille with heritage "R/T" badge, the custom vinyl hood graphic, roof wrap, rear R/T spoiler and the "DAYTONA" graphic on the rear quarter panels. It featured exclusive 20-inch five-spoke polished aluminum wheels with Gloss Black painted pockets.

Models also included a 'Daytona Blue' engine cover, performance 3.06 rear axle ratio, high-speed engine controller, paddle shifters with sport mode and performance steering and suspension.

The Charger Daytona's interior on the Road & Track featured unique black performance Nappa leather and suede heated and ventilated seats with Daytona Blue stitching and piping. Similarly, the Daytona on the R/T offered the same appearance in a custom sport cloth seat. "DAYTONA" was embroidered in blue into the upper front seat backs. Unique dark brushed aluminum trim surrounded the 8.4-inch Uconnect Touch screen and gauges on the instrument panel, as well as the trim around the shifter and cup holders on the center console. Finishing touches included a Mopar bright pedal kit, a 552-watt 10-speaker Beats Audio System, and a special numbered "DAYTONA" badge on the instrument panel that featured the build number of that specific Dodge Charger Daytona model.

The MSRP was $32,990 for R/T and $36,495 for R/T Road & Track Daytona models.

== Fourth generation (2015–2023) ==
Fourth generation (LD)
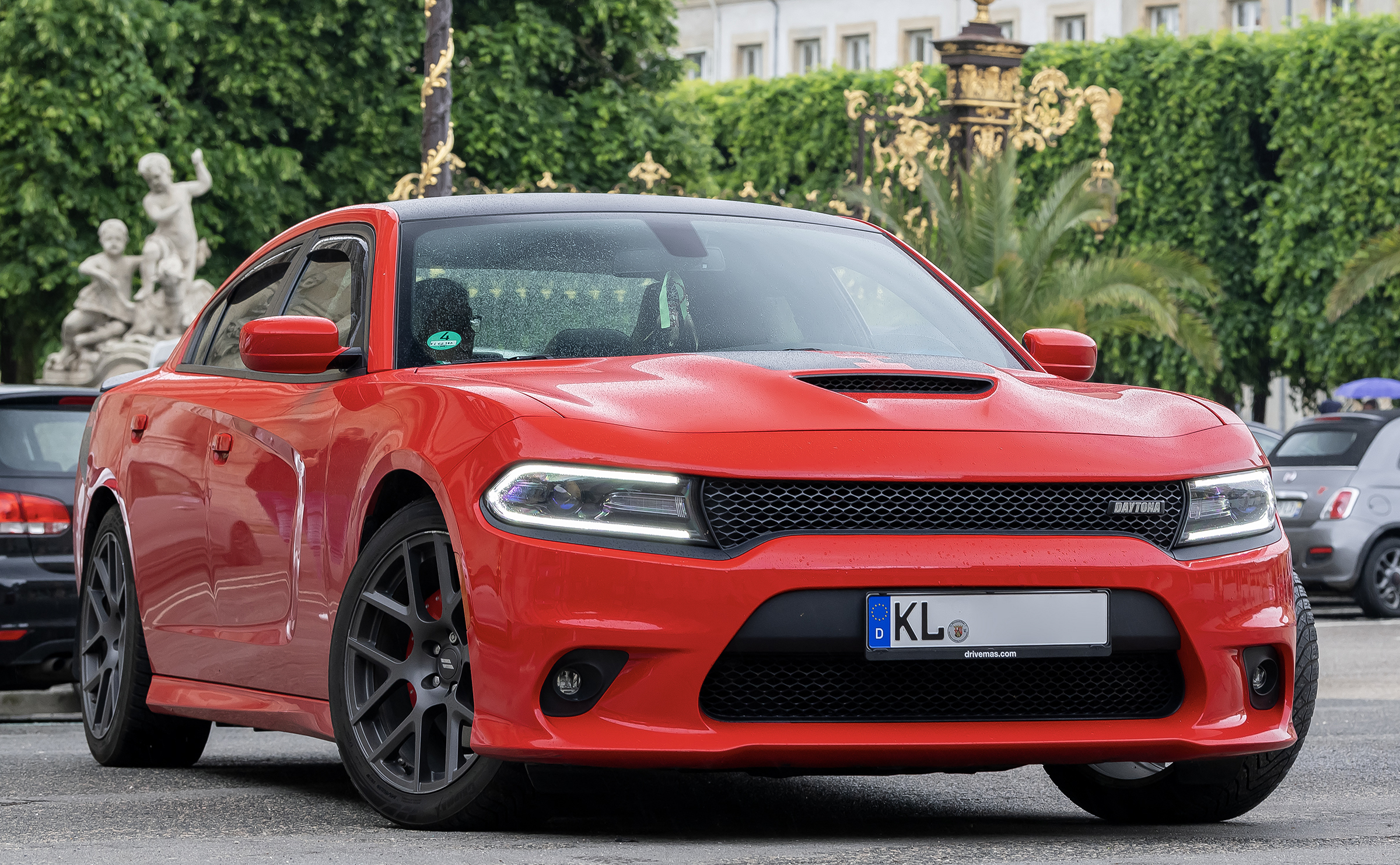

Overview
- Production: 2015–2023
- Assembly: Canada: Brampton, Ontario (Brampton Assembly)

Body and chassis
- Class: Muscle car
- Body style: 4-door sedan
- Platform: Chrysler LX platform
- Related: Chrysler 300C; Dodge Charger R/T; Dodge Challenger

Powertrain
- Engine: 5.7 L (345 CID) HEMI Eagle V8; 6.4 L (392 CID) HEMI Apache V8
- Transmission: 8-speed automatic with AutoStick

Dimensions
- Wheelbase: 120.2 in (3,053 mm)
- Length: 200.8 in (5,100 mm)
- Width: 75 in (1,905 mm)
- Height: 58.2 in (1,478 mm)

The new 2017 Dodge Charger Daytona and Daytona 392 was unveiled in August 2016. In the US market, where it is most popular, it features a choice of either a 5.7 L or 6.4 L V8. In Canada, the Charger Daytona is only available with the 5.7 L V8. The Daytona and Daytona 392 trim will also include the upgrades from the Super Track Pack (sport suspension, custom brake linings, and Goodyear Eagle F1 tires). Unlike the 2013 Daytona, the 2017 vehicles are not numbered.

The 2020 Daytona gets the 717-hp version of the standard Hellcat engine and is limited to 501 units.

== Production ==
Year	Production	Base Price
1969	503	US$5,903
2006	10,000	US$33,380
2007	2,900	US$36,090
2008	1,650	US$37,065
2009	400	US$37,610
2013	3000	US$36,495
2017	3,631 R/T; 2,508 392	US$39,995
2020	501 Hellcat	US$74,140

== See also ==
- Dodge Charger 500
- Ford Torino Talladega
- Plymouth Superbird
- Dodge Charger (2024)#Charger Daytona
