= Dodge 330 =

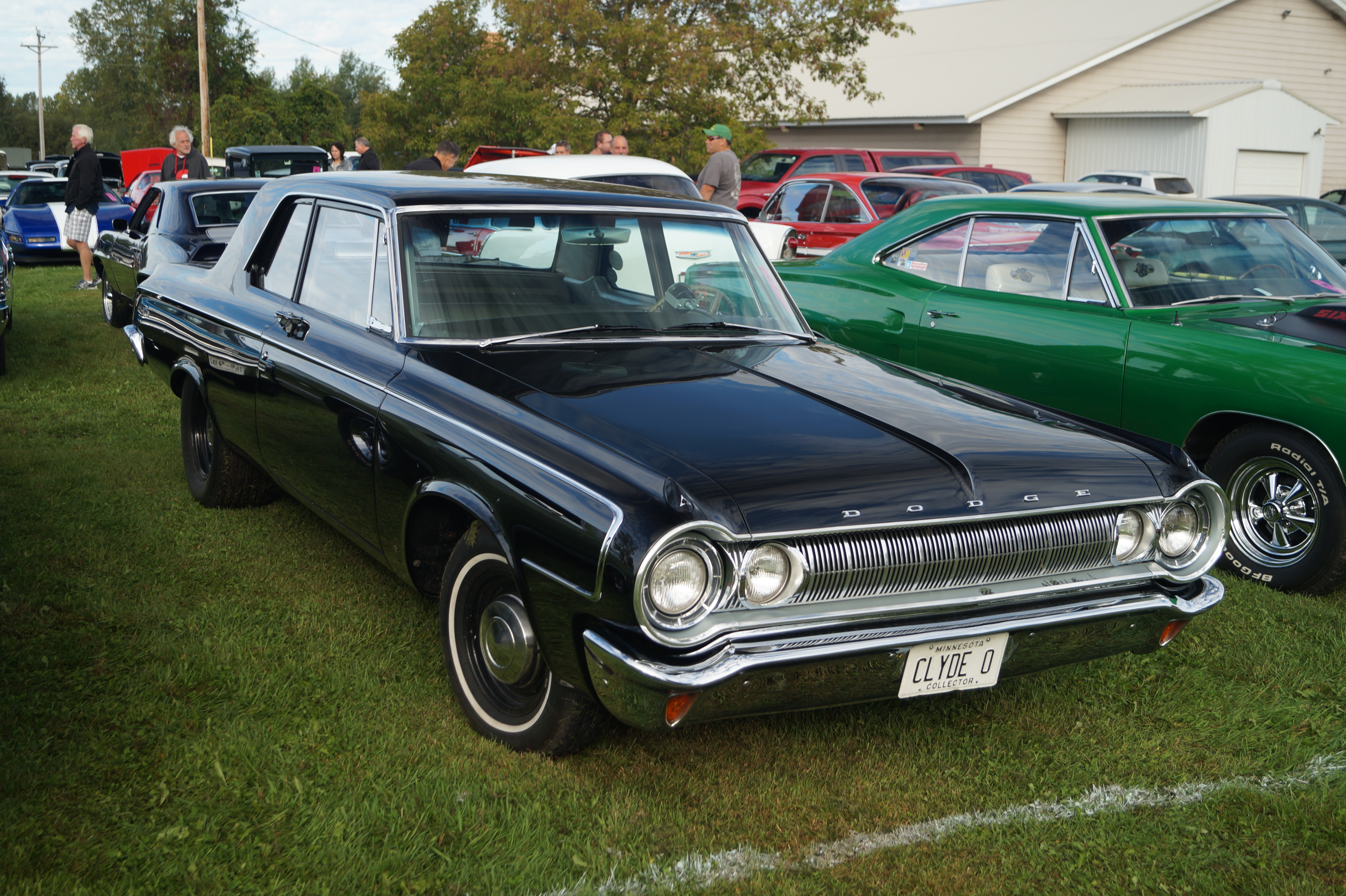
- 1964 Dodge 330 two-door sedan

Overview
- Manufacturer: Dodge (Chrysler)
- Production: 1962–1964 (until 1965 for Canada)
- Designer: Virgil Exner

Body and chassis
- Class: Full size
- Body style: 2-door sedan; 4-door sedan; 4-door station wagon; 2-door hardtop (1962)
- Layout: FR
- Platform: B-body
- Related: Dodge Dart; Dodge 440

Powertrain
- Engine: 225 cu in (3.7 L) Slant-6 I6; 318 cu in (5.2 L) A V8; 361 cu in (5.9 L) B V8 (1962); 383 cu in (6.3 L) B V8 (1963-1964); 426 cu in (7.0 L) RB V8 (1963-1964)
- Transmission: 3-speed manual 3-speed automatic

Dimensions
- Wheelbase: 119 in (3,023 mm)
- Length: 208.1 in (5,286 mm)

Chronology
- Successor: Dodge Polara

The Dodge 330 is a mid-size car marketed by Dodge for the 1962 model year as a trim level above the base Dodge Dart.

For the 1963 and 1964 model years, the 330 was the base trim of the mid-size lineup. It was one of the first vehicles to use Chrysler's unibody B-Body platform. The 330 series was available as a two-door or four-door sedan as well as a 6- or 9-passenger station wagon body design. Dodge discontinued the 330 model name for the 1964 model year (1965 in Canada).

== Design ==
Virgil Exner designed the 1962 models, while Elwood Engel revised the styling for 1963 and 1964.

The cars feature a 119 in (3,023 mm) wheelbase and are 208.1 in (5,286 mm) long. There was also a higher trimmed 440 and Polara available on the same "standard size" platform.

The base engine was the 225 Slant-Six. The 318 2bbl, 361 2bbl, 383 2bbl, 383 4bbl, and 426 4bbl were optional.

As an intermediate trim level above the Dart, it came standard with a cigarette lighter, front foam cushions, and rear arm rests.

The Dodge 330 Max Wedge is a 330 two-door sedan powered by the 426 Max Wedge featuring dual 4-barrel carburetors and rated at 415 hp (309 kW). It was available in both years, as Chrysler intended the engine for use in B-body cars destined for stock car ovals and dragstrips.

For the 1965 model year, full-sized Dodges were built on the new Chrysler C platform with a 121 in (3,073 mm) wheelbase, and the 330, 440, and 880 were all replaced by the new, larger "Polara" series.

For the Canadian market, the 330 was continued for one more year as the base model in the full-size Dodge line using the new-for-1965 body.

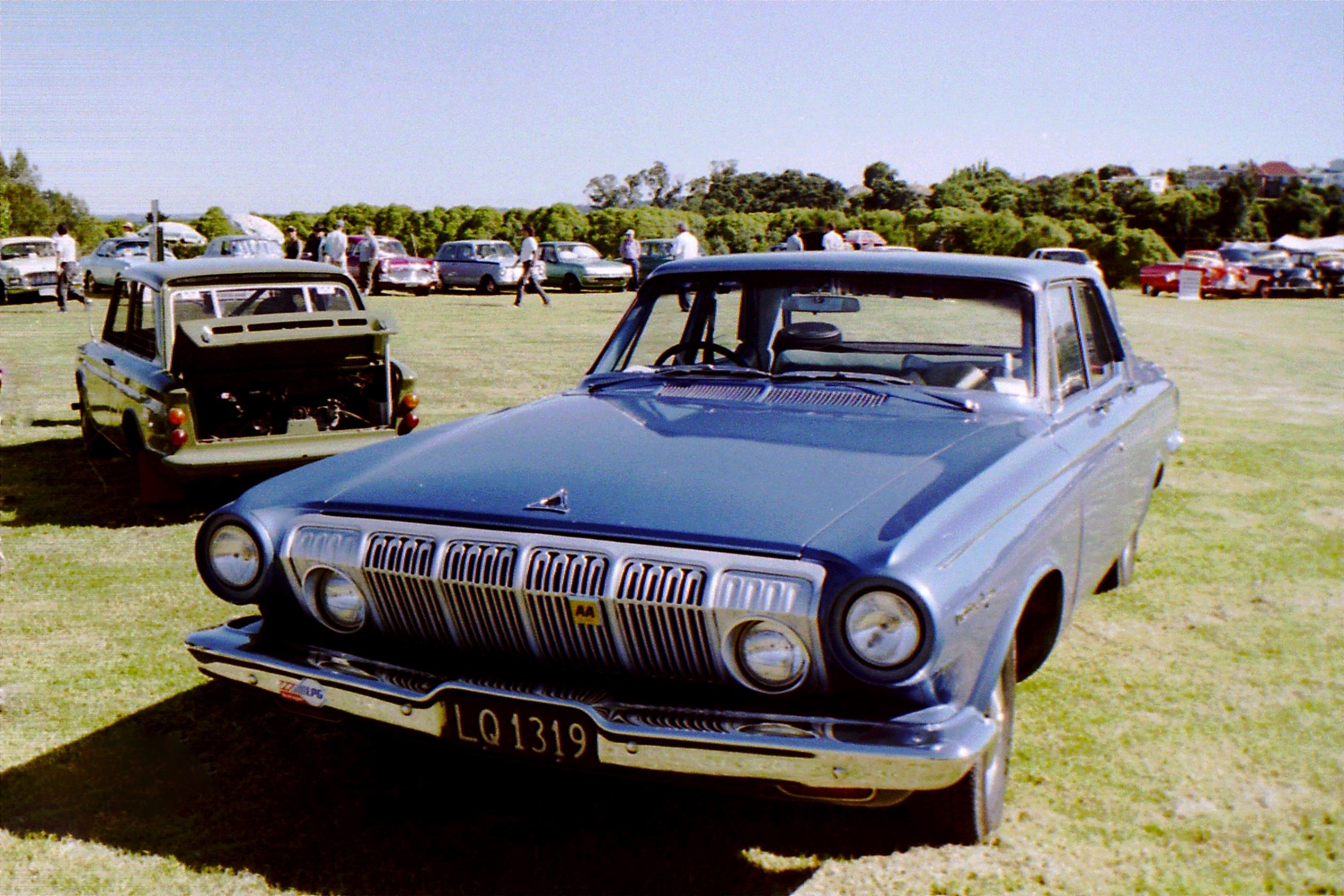
1963 Dodge 330 4-door sedan

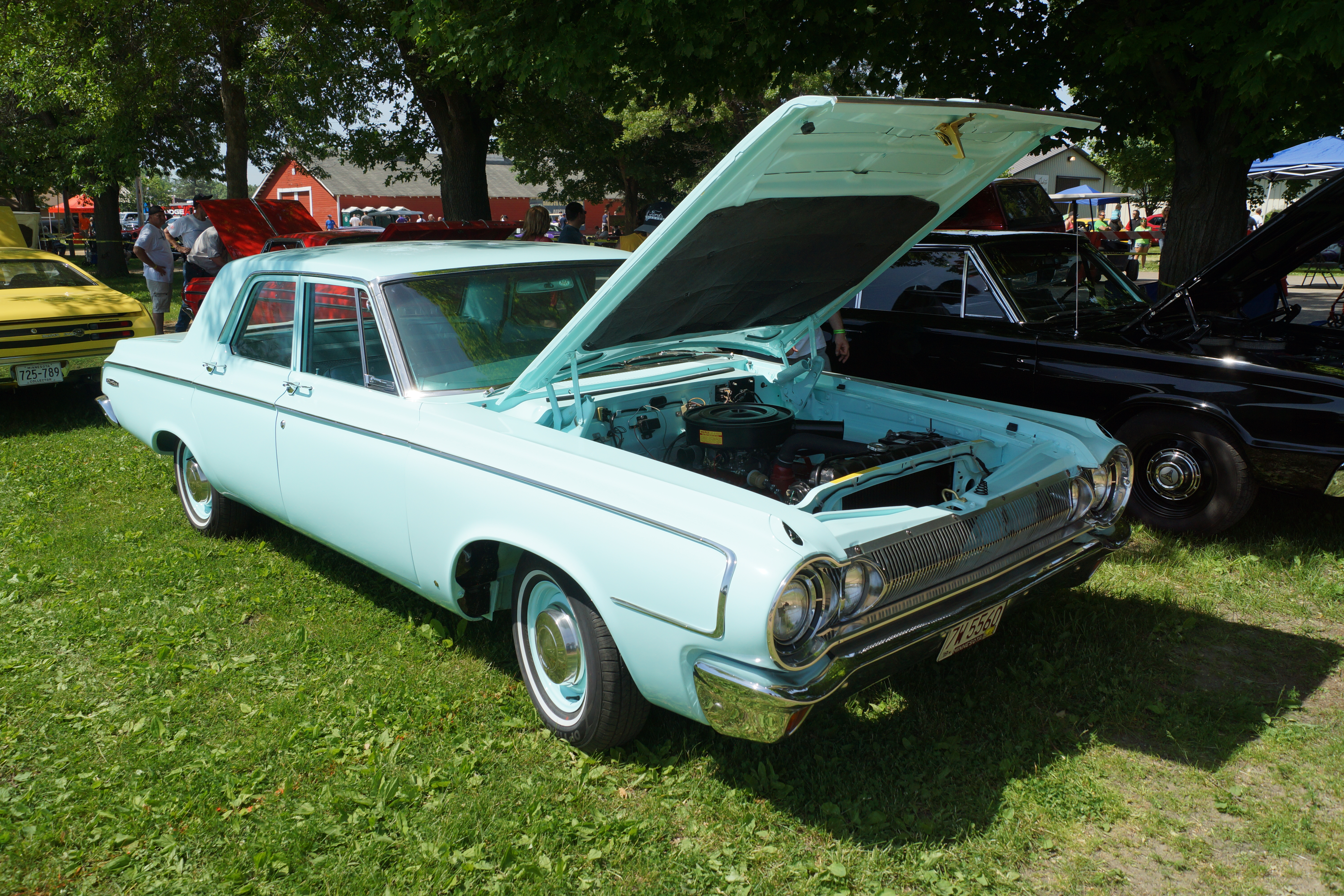
1964 Dodge 330 2-door sedan
