= Dodge Phoenix =

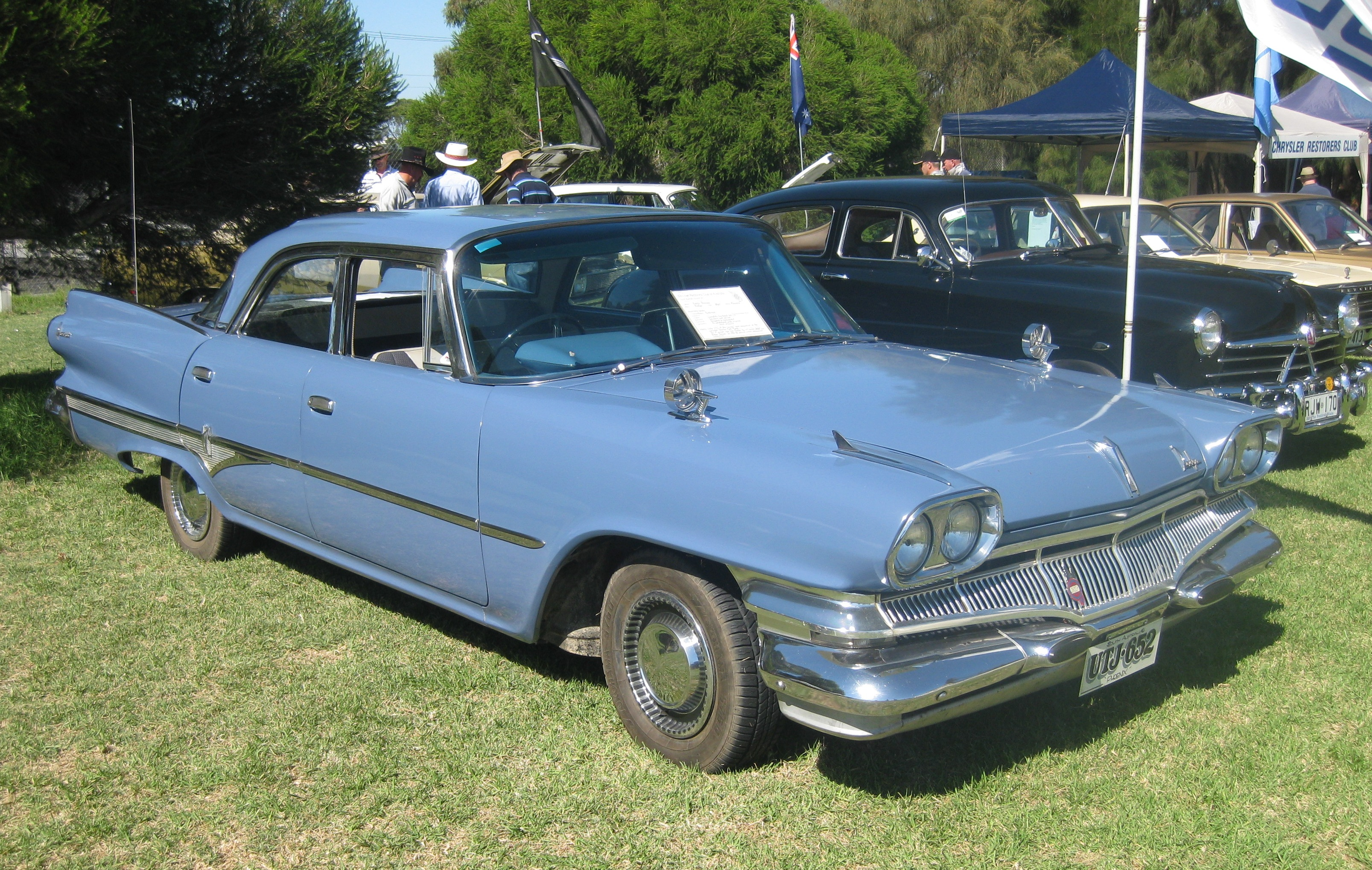
- 1960 Dodge PD4 Phoenix

Overview
- Manufacturer: Chrysler Australia
- Production: 1960–1972
- Assembly: Australia: Mile End; Australia: Tonsley Park; Australia: Port Melbourne

Body and chassis
- Class: Full-size
- Body style: 4-door sedan 4-door hardtop
- Layout: FR layout
- Related: Dodge Dart; Dodge 440; Plymouth Fury

Powertrain
- Engine: 318 cu in (5.2 L) V8; 383 cu in (6.3 L) V8
- Transmission: 3spd automatic

Dimensions
- Wheelbase: (1968) 119.0 in (3023 mm)
- Length: (1968) 213.1 in (5413 mm)
- Width: (1968) 77.7 in (1974 mm)

Chronology
- Predecessor: Dodge Custom Royal
- Successor: Chrysler by Chrysler

The Dodge Phoenix is an automobile which was produced by Chrysler Australia from 1960 to 1972.

The Phoenix was introduced in May 1960 as an Australian assembled version of the American Dodge Dart, positioned above the locally developed Chrysler Royal as Chrysler Australia's luxury model. It borrowed its name from the top Dart, the Dodge Dart Phoenix, but unlike its American namesake it was offered only as a four-door sedan and only with a 318 cubic inch V8 engine. All Phoenixes for Australia had right-hand drive.

The Phoenix was subsequently restyled in line with the 1961 and 1962 Dodge Dart. For 1963 the new TD2 series Phoenix was derived from the US Dodge 440, and for 1965 and beyond the Phoenix was based on the Canadian Plymouth Fury III. Like the 1965 Fury, the 1965 Phoenix featured vertically stacked headlamps. A four-door hardtop body style joined the sedan in 1967. The hardtop was fitted with a 383 cubic inch V8 engine whilst the sedan continued with the smaller 318 cubic inch V8. The two body styles continued to be offered until the Australian Phoenix was discontinued. In addition, variants of the slightly longer U.S. station wagon were sold from the beginning for duty as hearses. Eventually, these were modified with two doors and oversized rear quarter windows, in the British hearse tradition.

Although the 1965 and later Phoenixes were basically Plymouth Furys, they did feature the North American style full size Dodge Polara instrument panel (adapted for right hand drive). They also continued to use the old-fashioned "clapper" windshield wipers (while North American models used modern parallel-action wipers).

After the Phoenix was discontinued, the Australian-developed Chrysler by Chrysler inherited the role of the top level luxury model in Chrysler Australia's model range.

== Model history ==
=== PD4 ===
The first Australian Dodge Phoenix, coded the PD4, was released in May 1960. A Canadian Dodge with a Plymouth dashboard, it was imported in CKD packs and assembled at Chrysler Australia's Mile End, South Australia Mile End facility. The PD4 Phoenix was offered only as a 4-door sedan, in two trim levels, the De Luxe and the Luxury Liner. The PD4 had a 118-inch wheelbase and was powered by a 318 cubic inch OHV V8 engine. The Phoenix name was derived from the Dodge Dart Phoenix, on which it was based.

=== RD4 ===
The RD4 Phoenix of 1961 used the cabin section of the PD4 with new front and rear bodywork. Dimensions remained unchanged, as did the mechanical specifications, again being based in the North American Dodge Dart.

=== SD2 ===
The SD2 of 1962 featured a shorter 116 inch wheelbase and a completely new body which was both shorter and narrower than its predecessor being now based on the downsized US Dodge Dart.

=== TD2 ===
The TD2 of 1963 was the first Phoenix to be based on the renamed Dodge 440 model, with Dodge moving the Dart name to the new compact A-body line. The 4 door sedan body style and the 318 cubic inch engine were retained.

=== VD2 ===
The VD2 Phoenix was introduced in 1964. The wheelbase was now 119 inches and the overall length increased by four inches to 212. The VD2 was based on the 1964 North American Dodge 440.

=== AP2D ===
The AP2D Phoenix was introduced in 1965. This model was a rebadged Canadian Plymouth Fury III, a strategy that Chrysler Australia would continue through to the end of 1972. The 1965 model featured vertically stacked four-headlight frontal styling. The 318 cubic inch engine were retained. A Plymouth hood ornament was used, with the Dodge "Fratzog" superimposed over the Plymouth outline.

=== DB6 ===
The 1966 Phoenix was coded DB6. Changes follow the 1966 Fury III; a new grille, revised rear panels, new taillights and a new bootlid.

=== DC ===
The 1967 Phoenix was coded as the DC series. It was the first Phoenix to be available with a choice of bodystyles, a 4-door hardtop now offered in addition to the 4 door sedan. The sedan retained the 318 cid V8 engine and while the hardtop was fitted with a 383 cid V8. In the later part of 1967 Chrysler Australia shifted Phoenix assembly from Tonsley Park to its Port Melbourne facility.

=== DD ===
The 1968 Phoenix was coded DD. The main changes for 1968 were new rear sheet metal and new taillights. Round side marker lights were introduced, the same ones used on the North American Plymouth Fury.

=== DE ===
The DE Phoenix was introduced in 1969. The new model featured horizontal dual headlights, and a 120-inch wheelbase. Overall length was now 214.5 inches. It was marketed as the 400 Limited Edition series with each car carrying a numbered dashboard badge. Production was planned to be limited to 400 sedans and 400 hardtops, although actual production did not reach 400 units of either. 371 examples of the DE were built at Chrysler Australia's Port Melbourne facility in 1969 and a further 385 in 1970. For the first time, DE models featured hidden, parallel-action windshield wipers. The body was completely new and featured the Plymouth Fury "Fuselage" curved sides.

=== DF ===
The DF Phoenix was introduced in 1970. Again it was marketed as the Phoenix 400 with sedans and hardtops carrying individually numbered dash plaques. 298 were built at Port Melbourne in 1970 and 110 in 1971.

=== DG ===
The DG Phoenix was introduced in 1971, again as the Phoenix 400 with individually numbered sedans and hardtops. 298 were built at Port Melbourne in 1971.

=== DH ===
The DH Phoenix was introduced in 1972. 73 were built at Port Melbourne in that year. A decision to close the outdated Port Melbourne facility led to the discontinuation of the Phoenix.

== Gallery ==
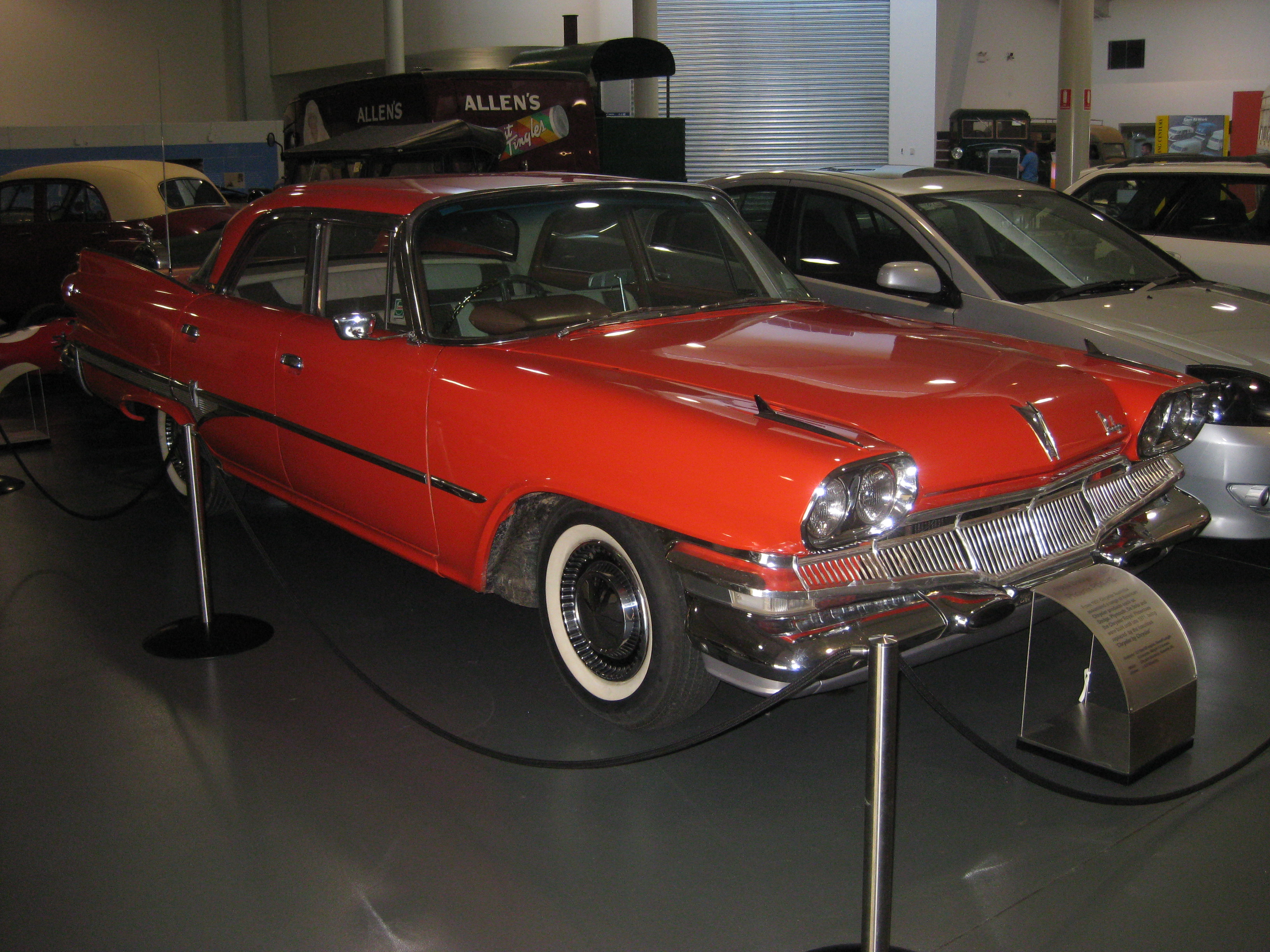
Dodge PD4 Phoenix

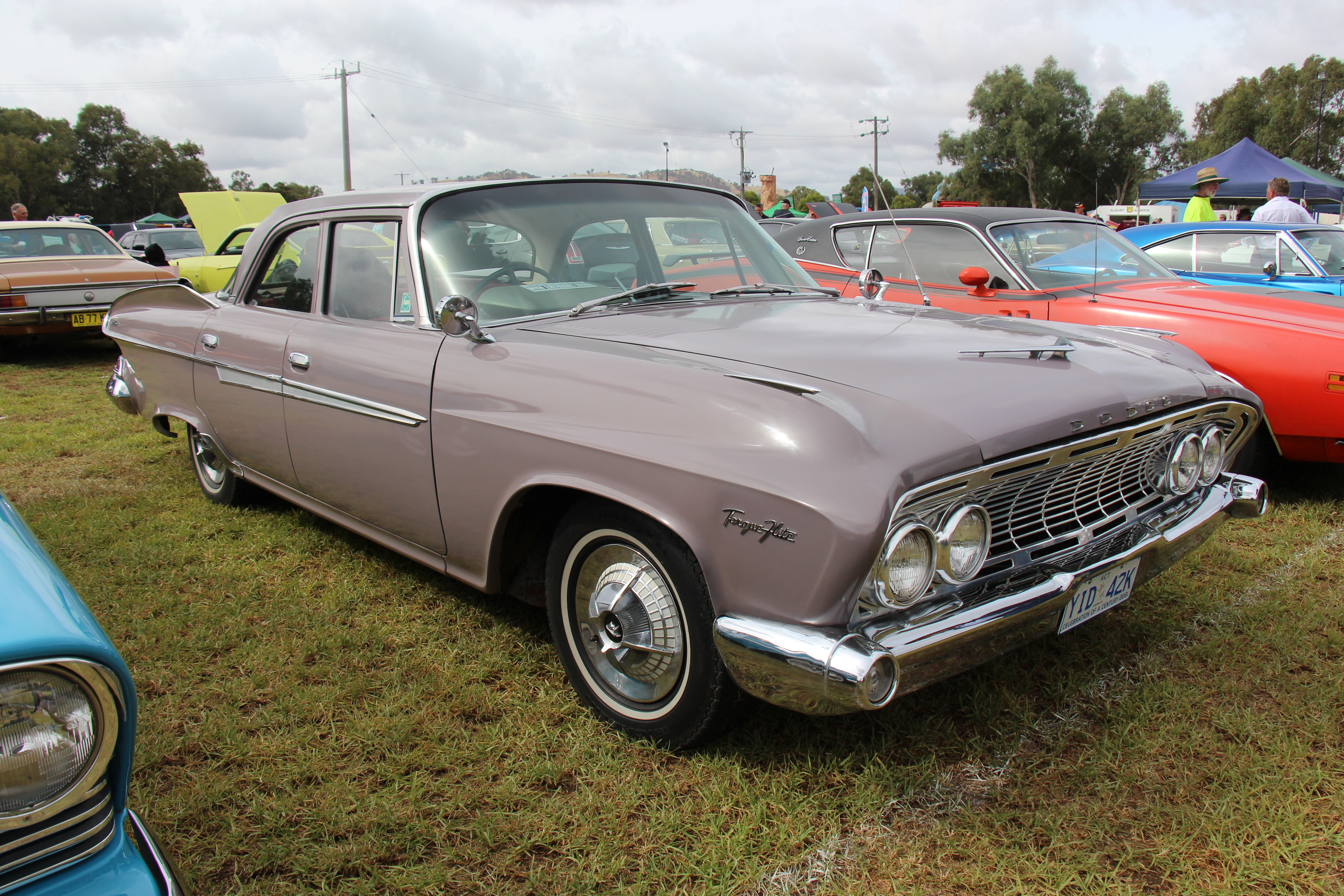
Dodge RD4 Phoenix

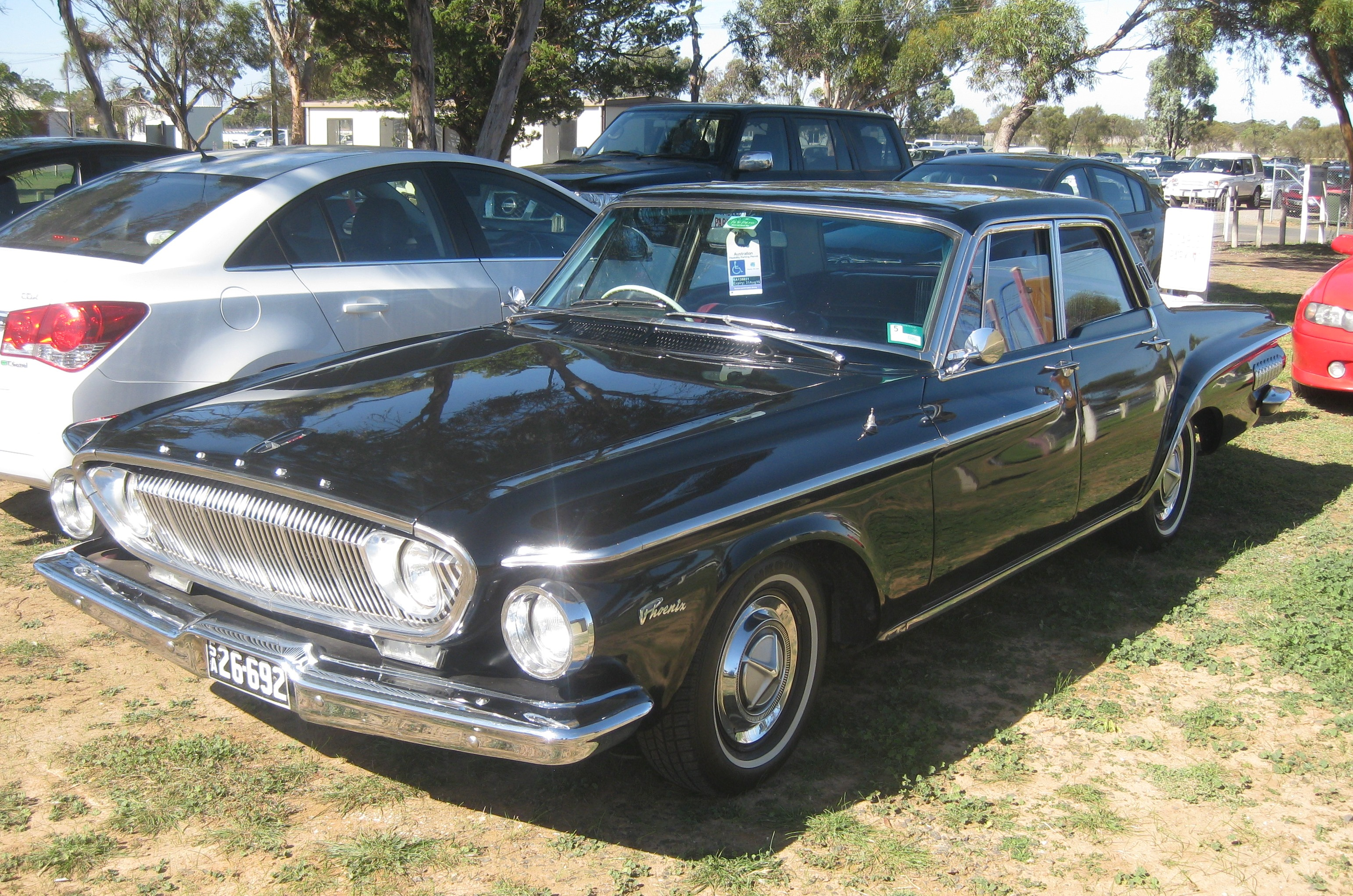
Dodge SD2 Phoenix

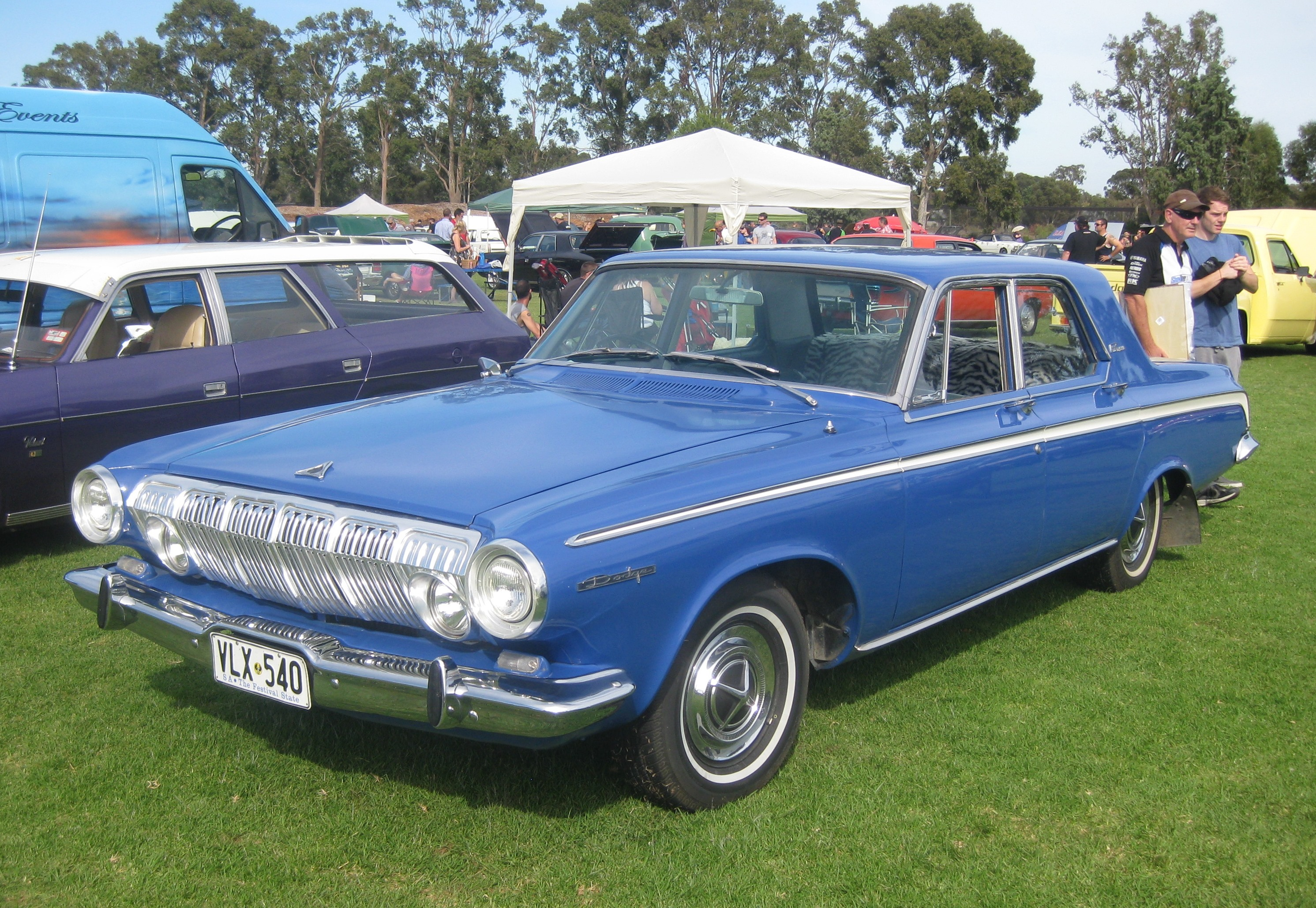
Dodge TD2 Phoenix

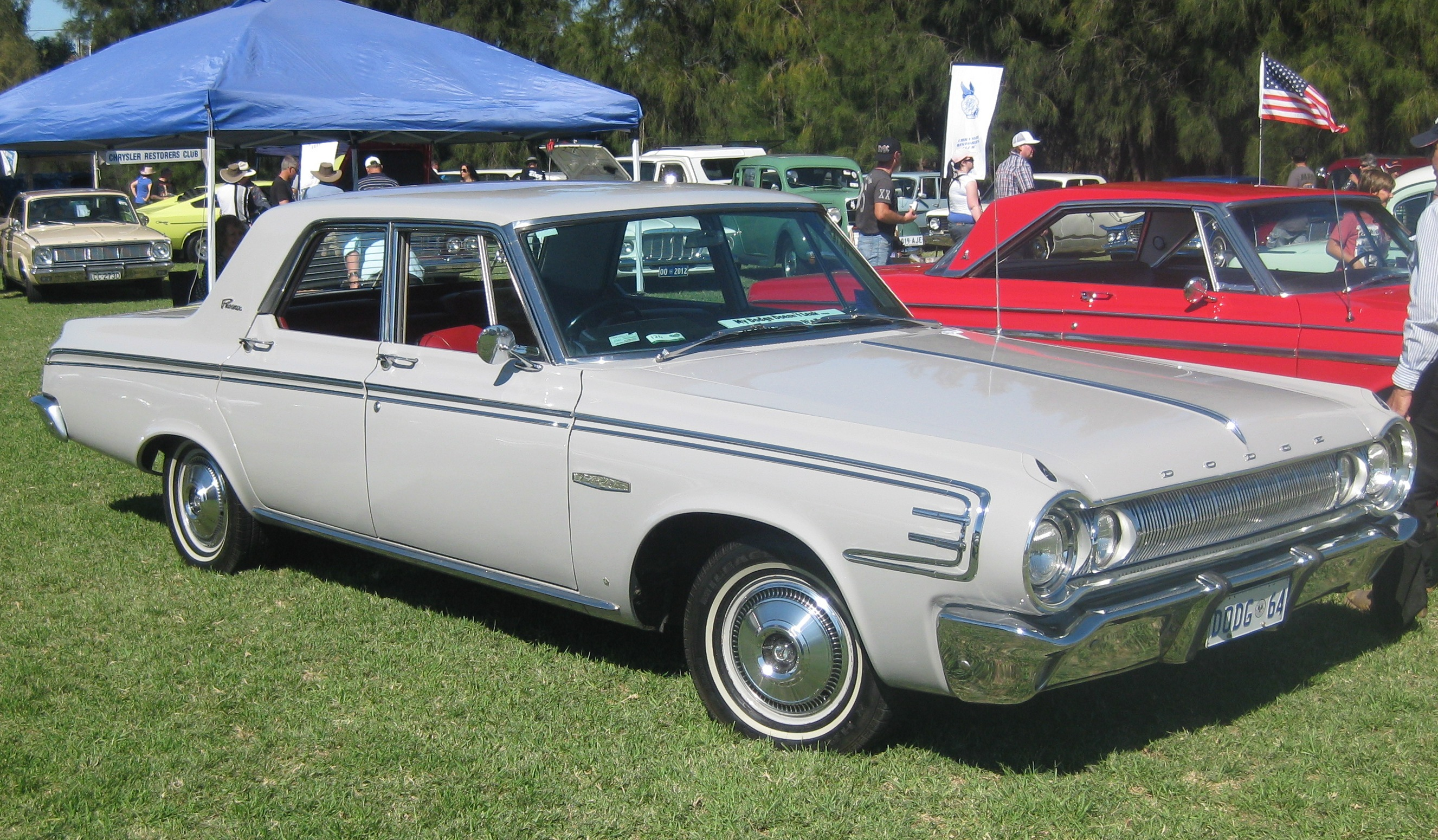
Dodge VD2 Phoenix

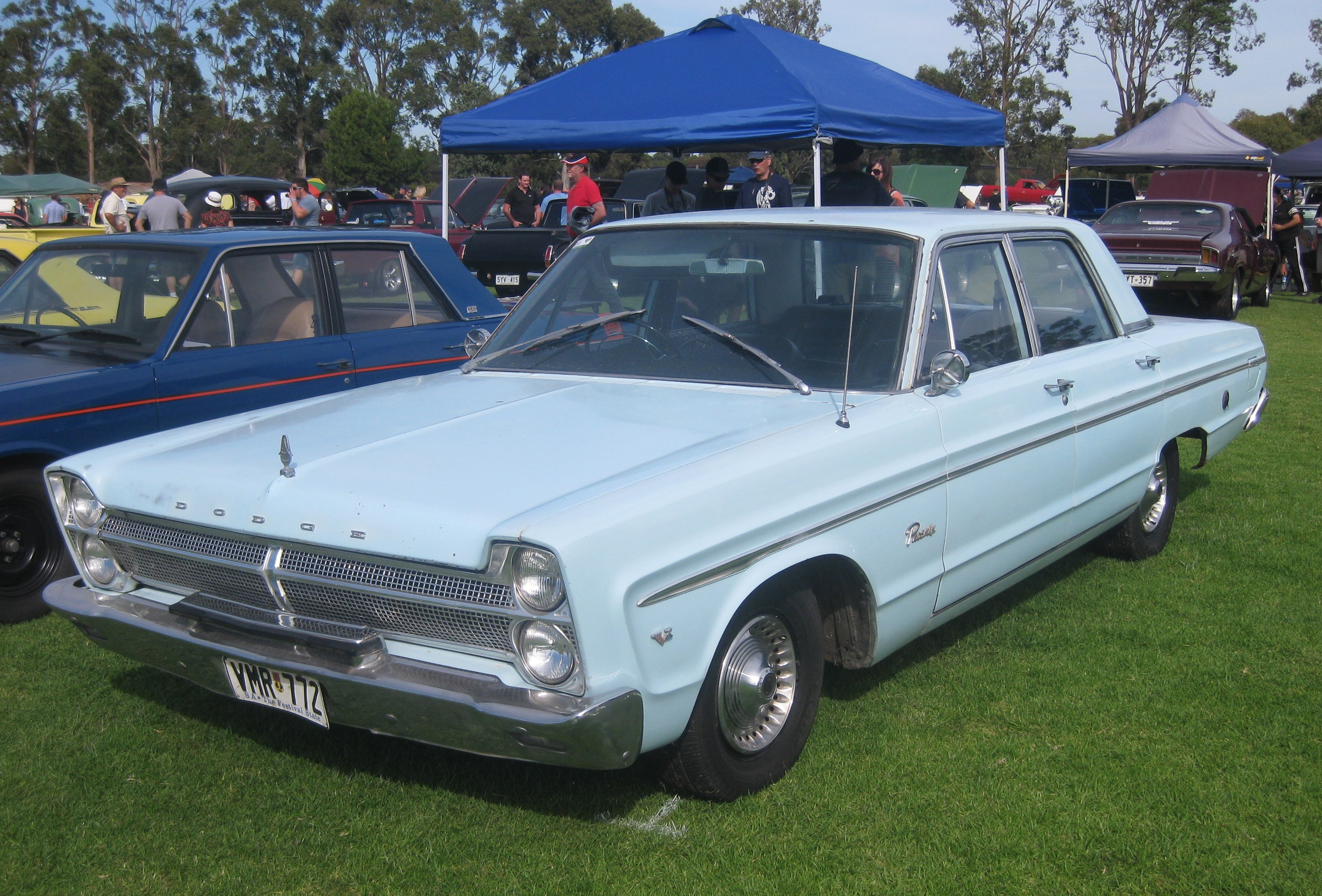
Dodge AP2D Phoenix

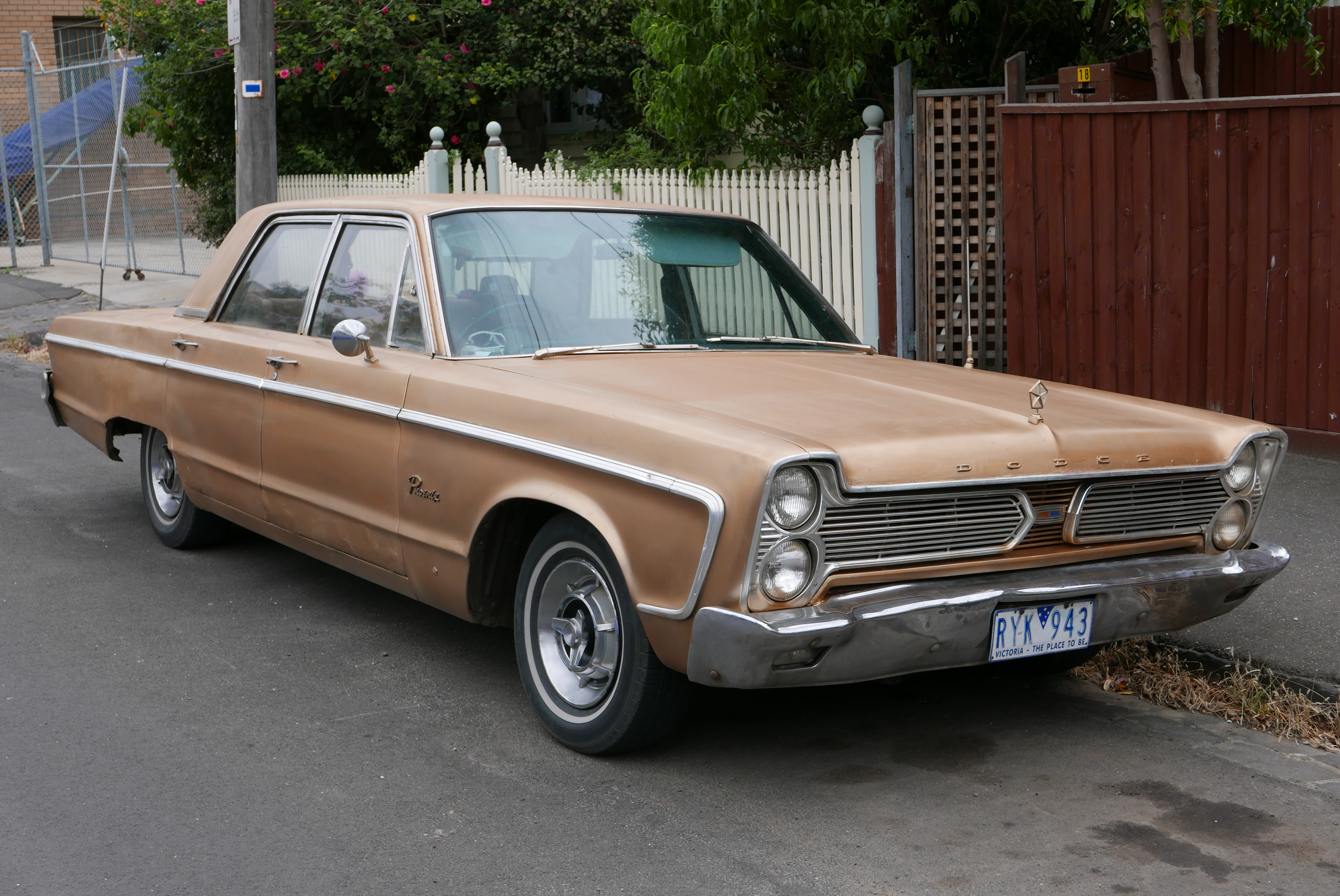
Dodge DP6 Phoenix

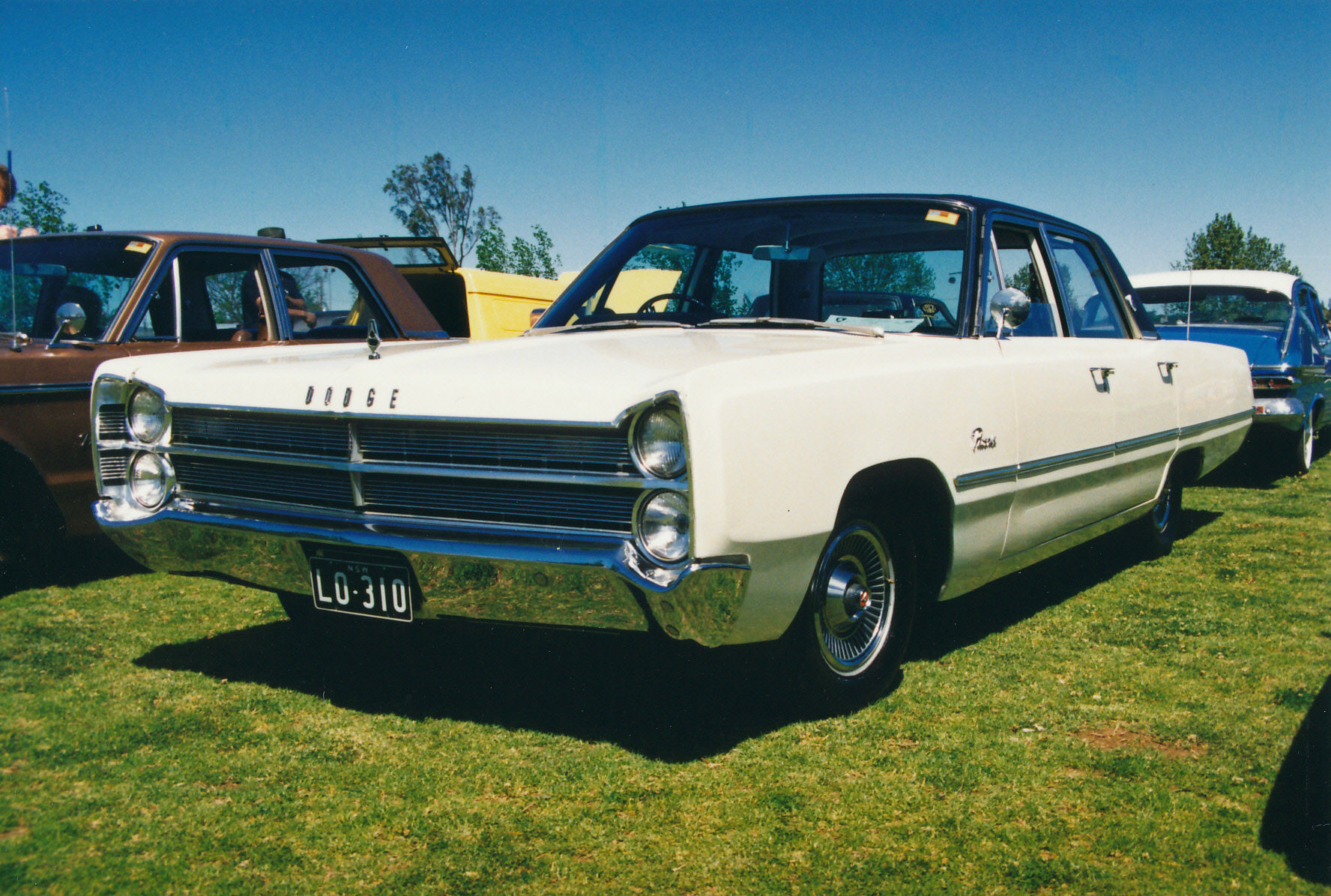
Dodge DC Phoenix sedan

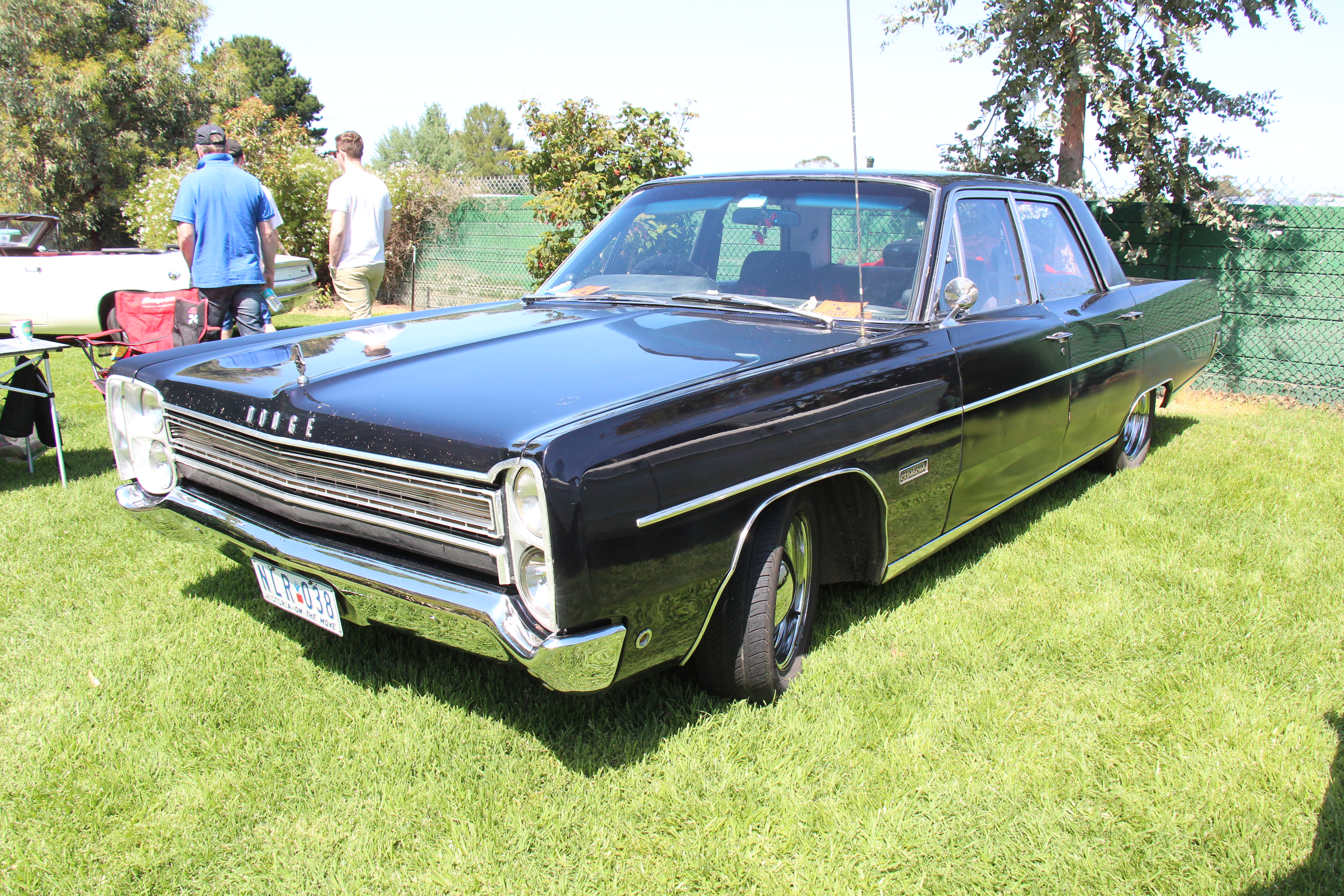
Dodge DD Phoenix sedan

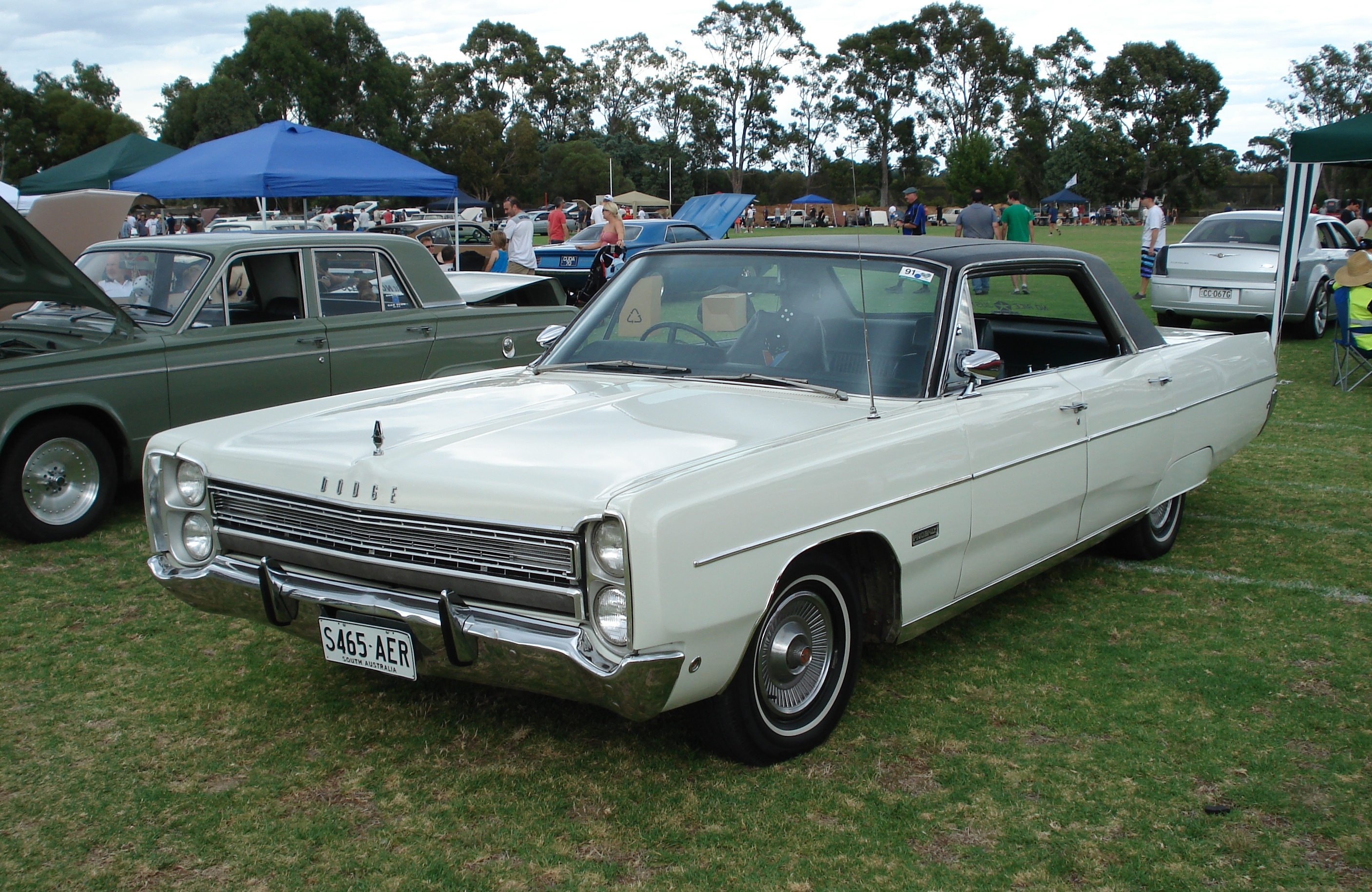
Dodge DD Phoenix hardtop

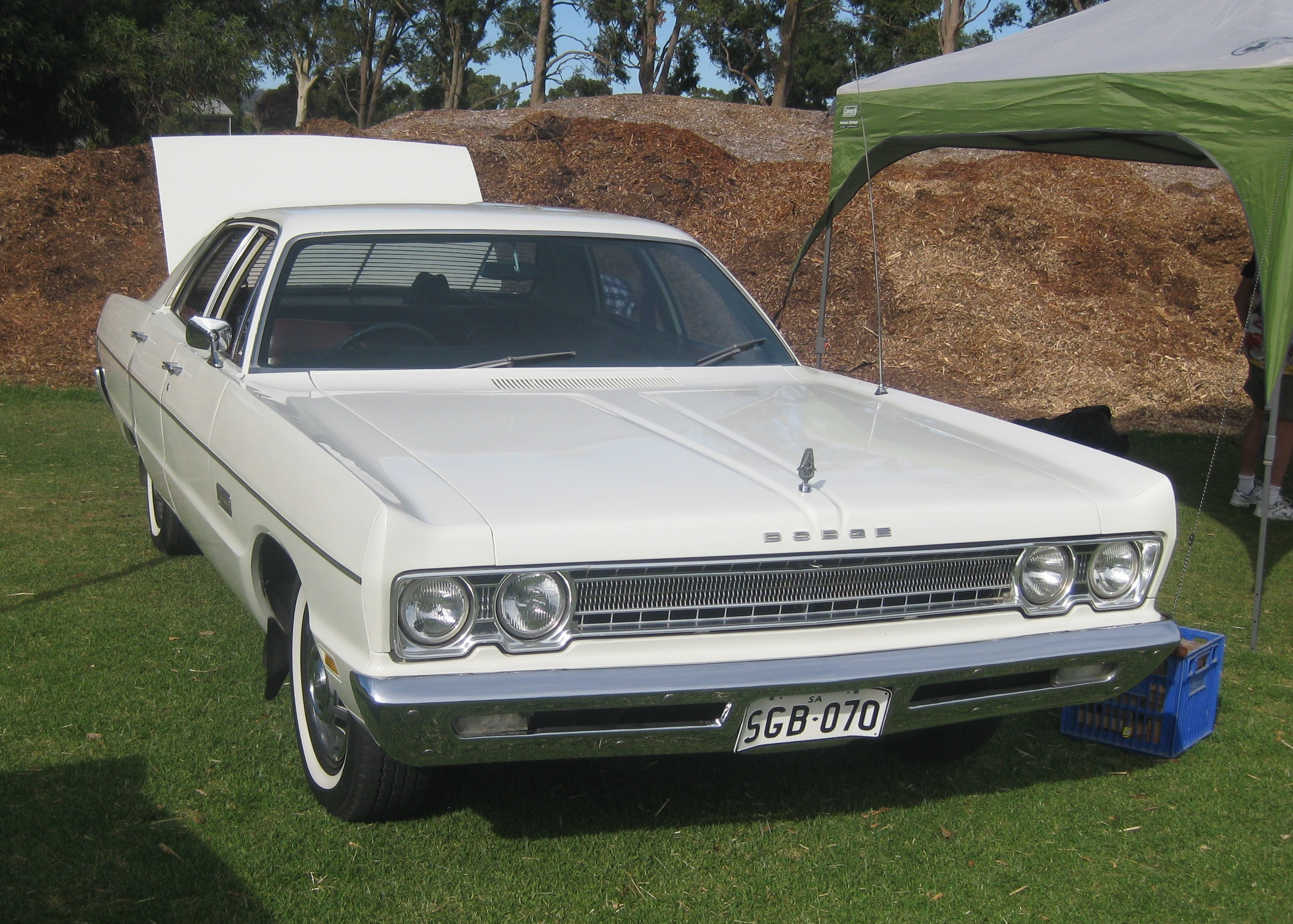
Dodge DE Phoenix sedan

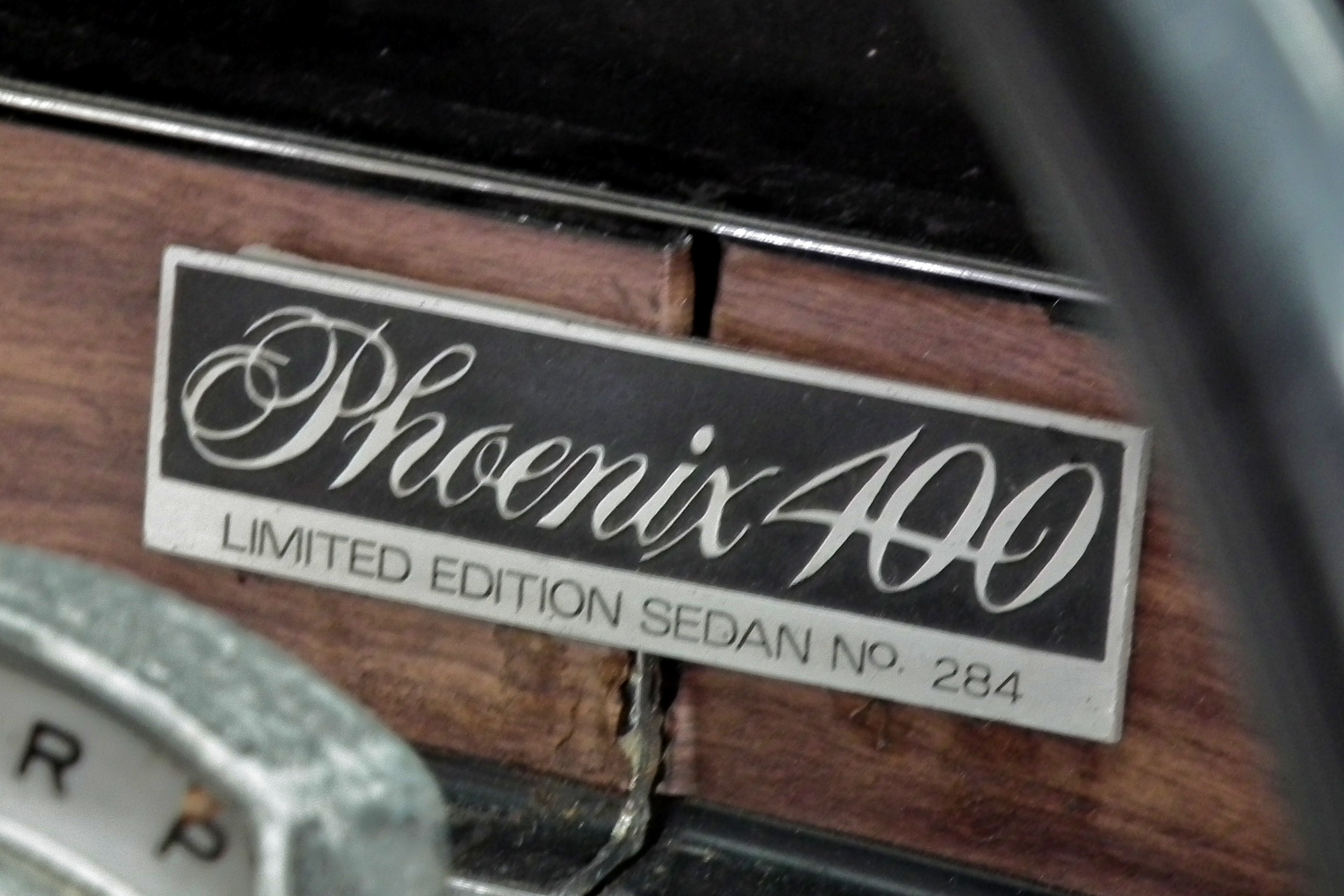
Dodge DE Phoenix sedan dash plaque

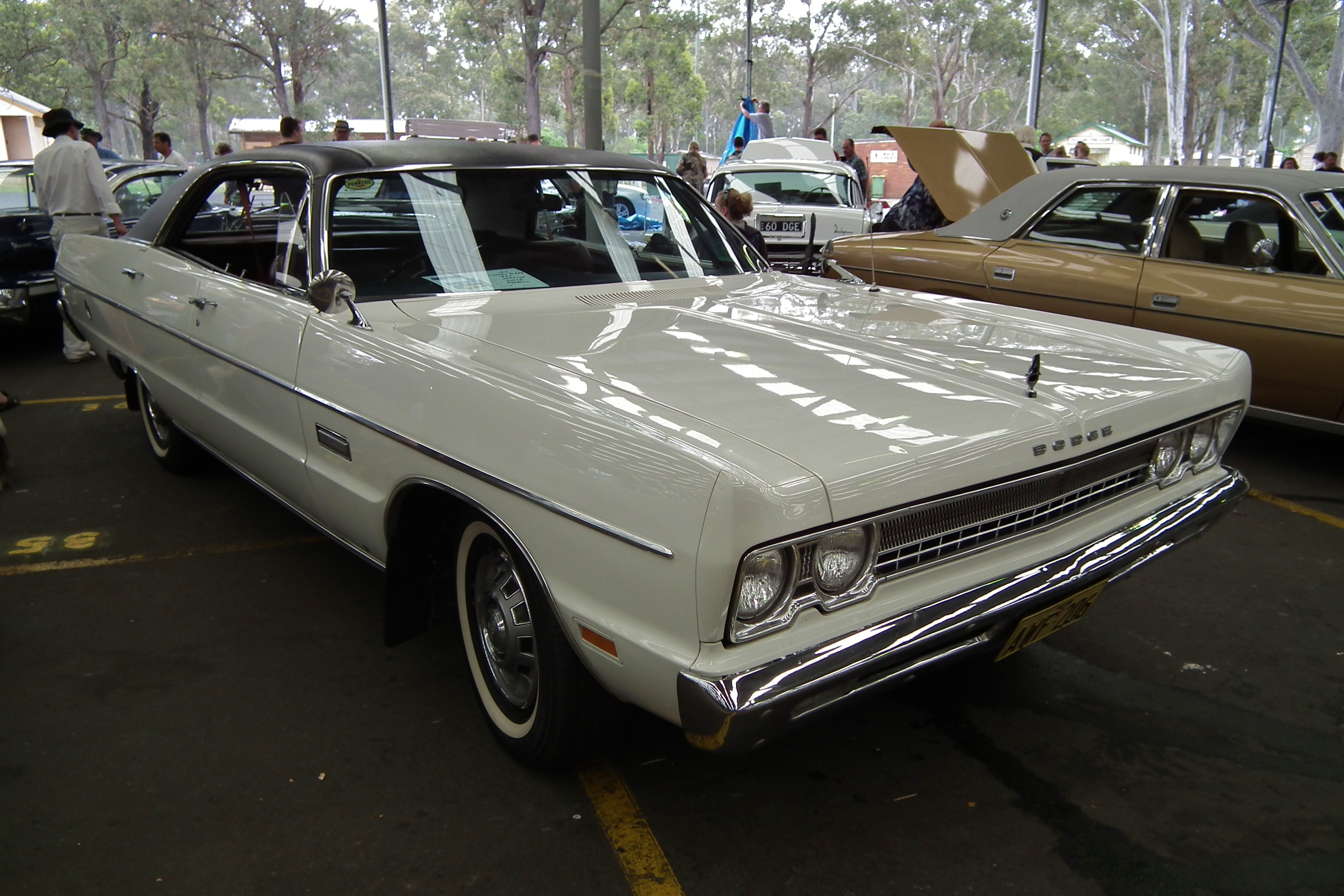
Dodge DE Phoenix hardtop

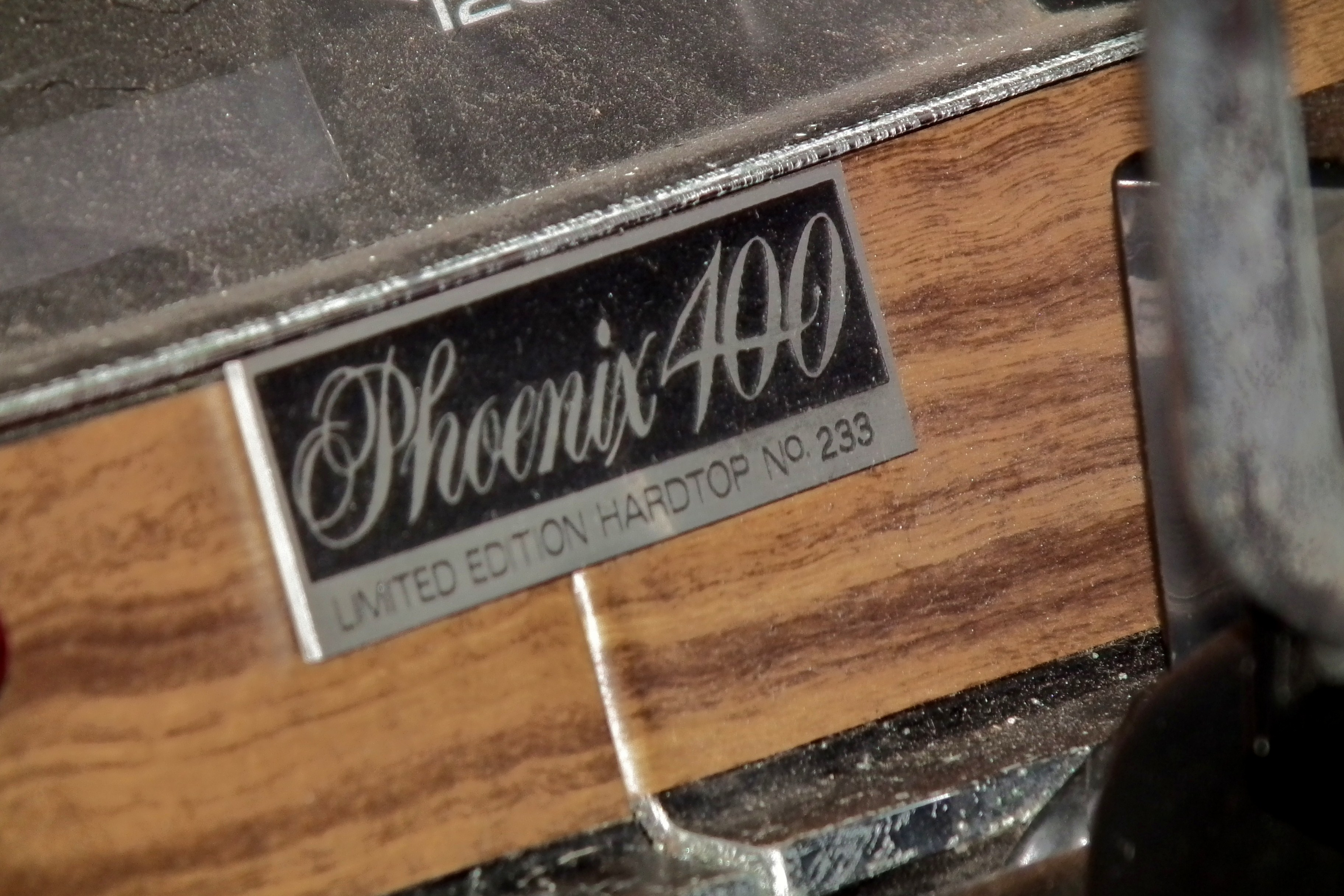
Dodge DE Phoenix hardtop dash plaque

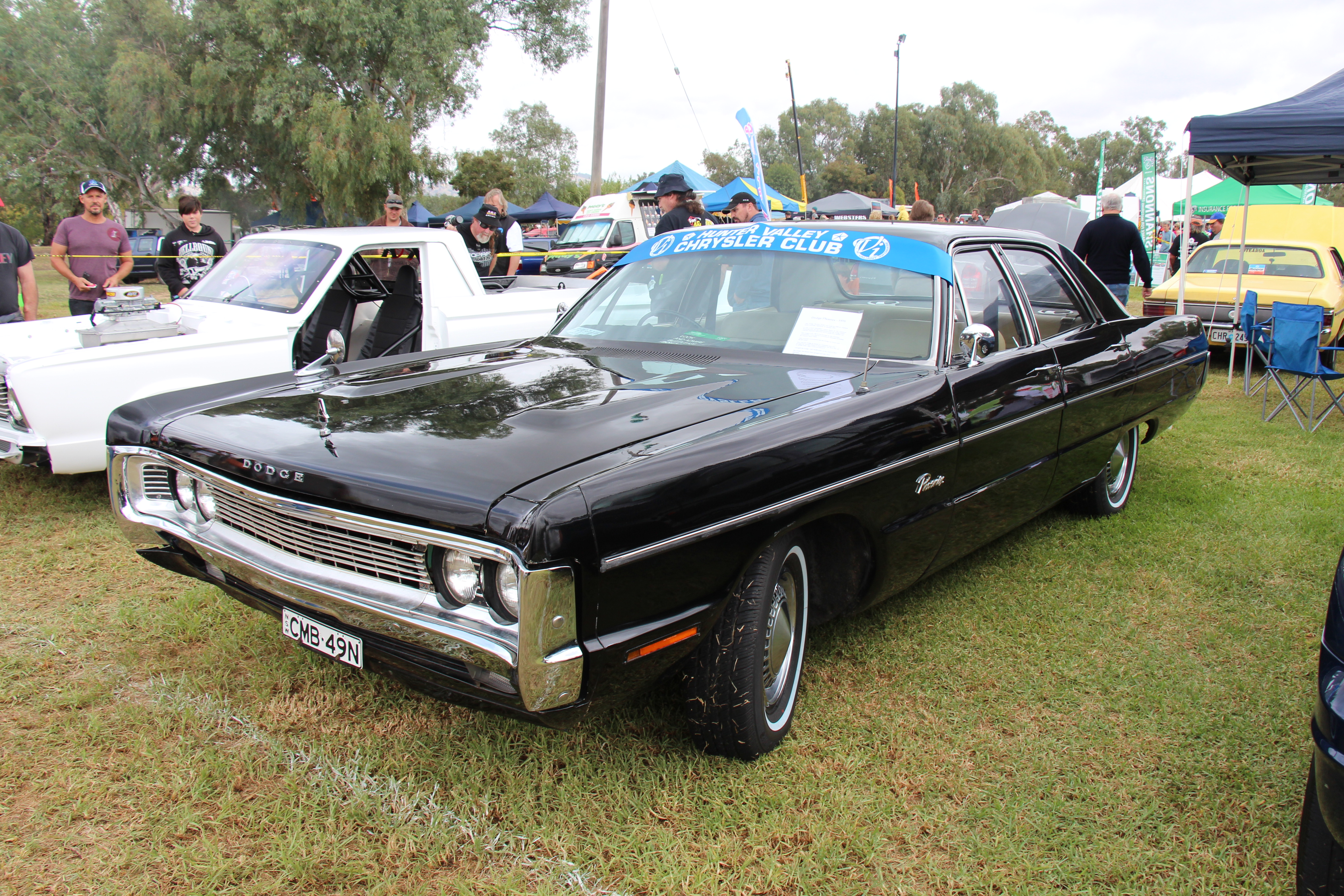
Dodge DF Phoenix sedan

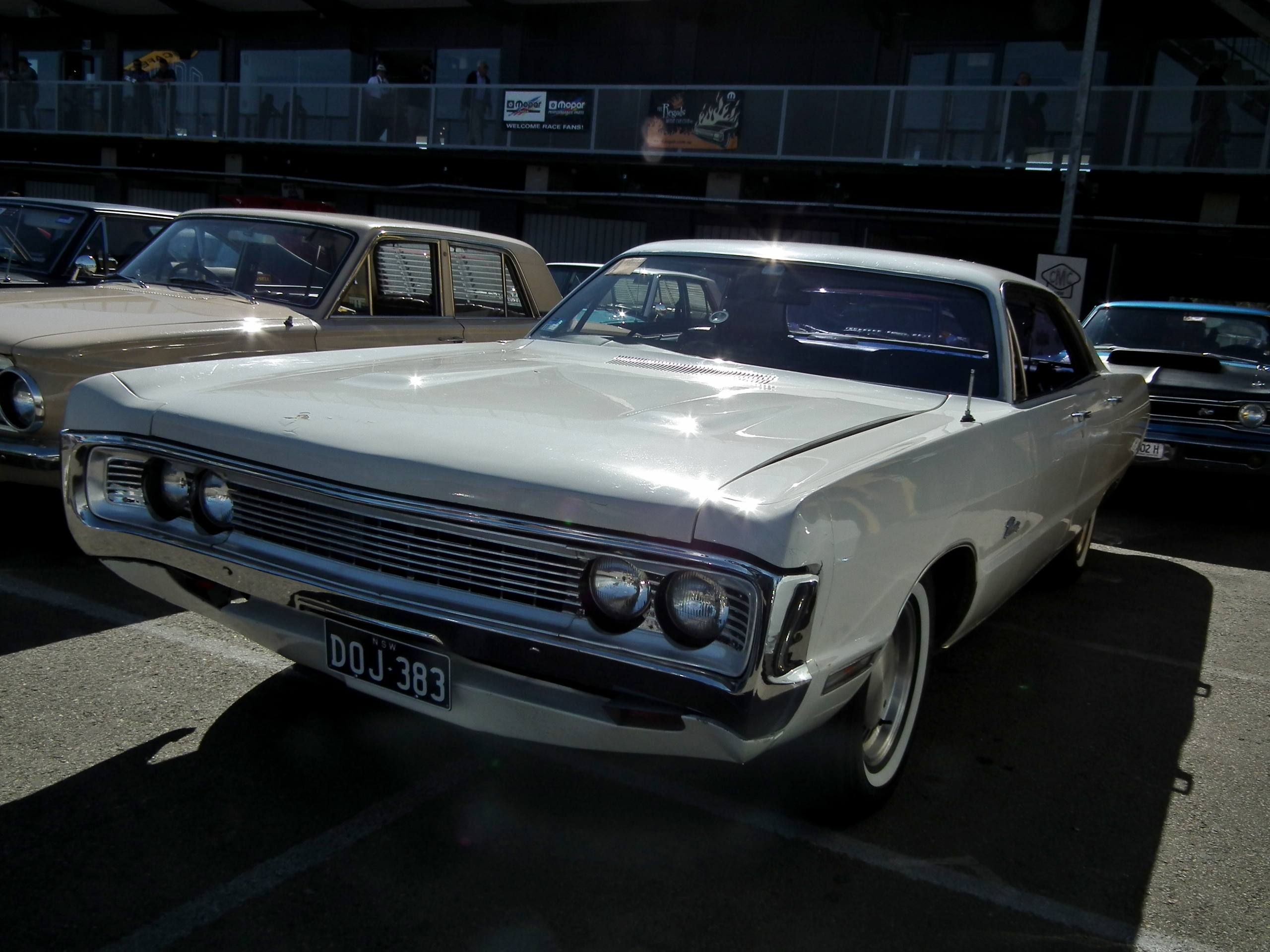
Dodge DF Phoenix hardtop

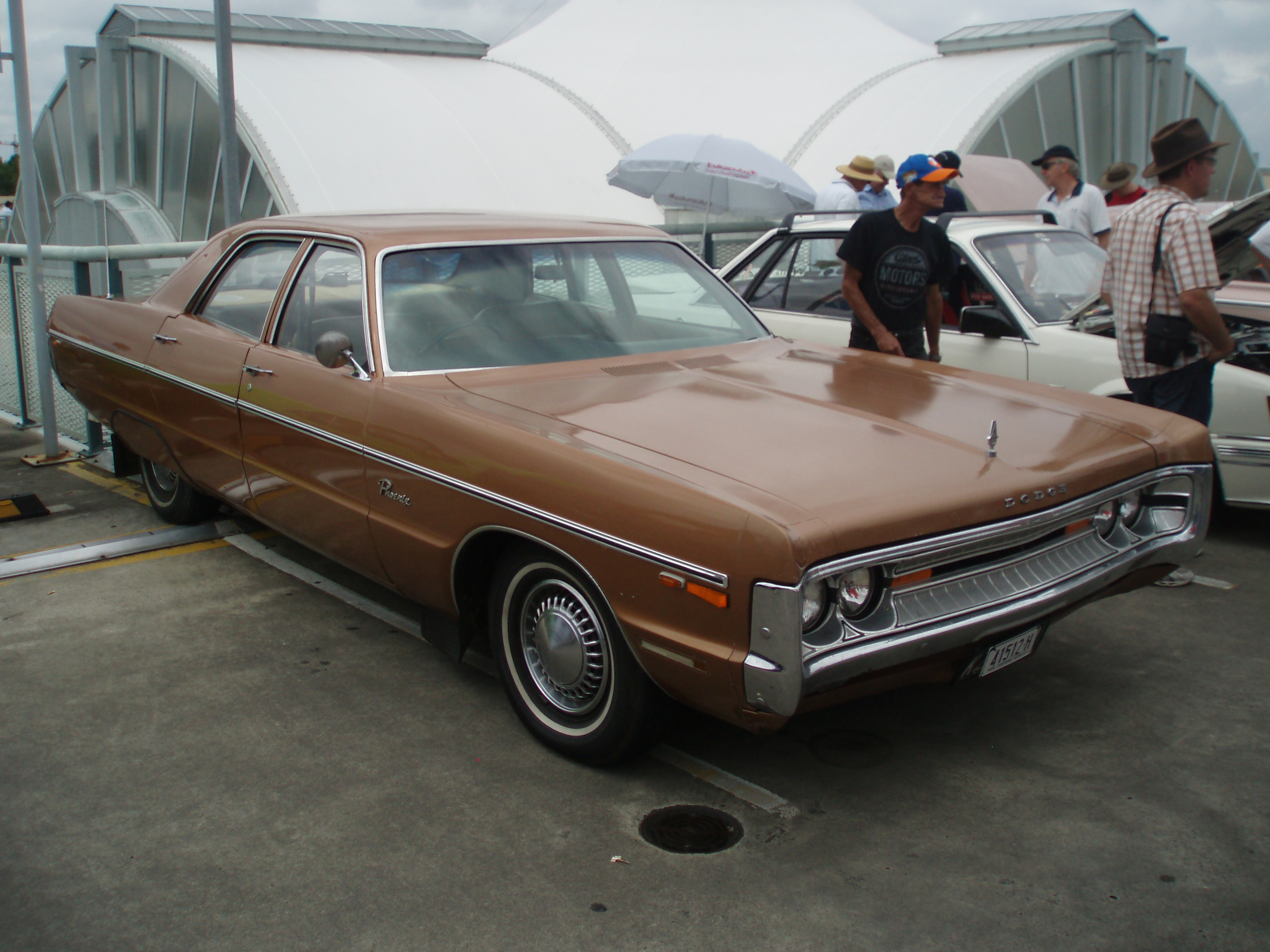
Dodge DG Phoenix sedan

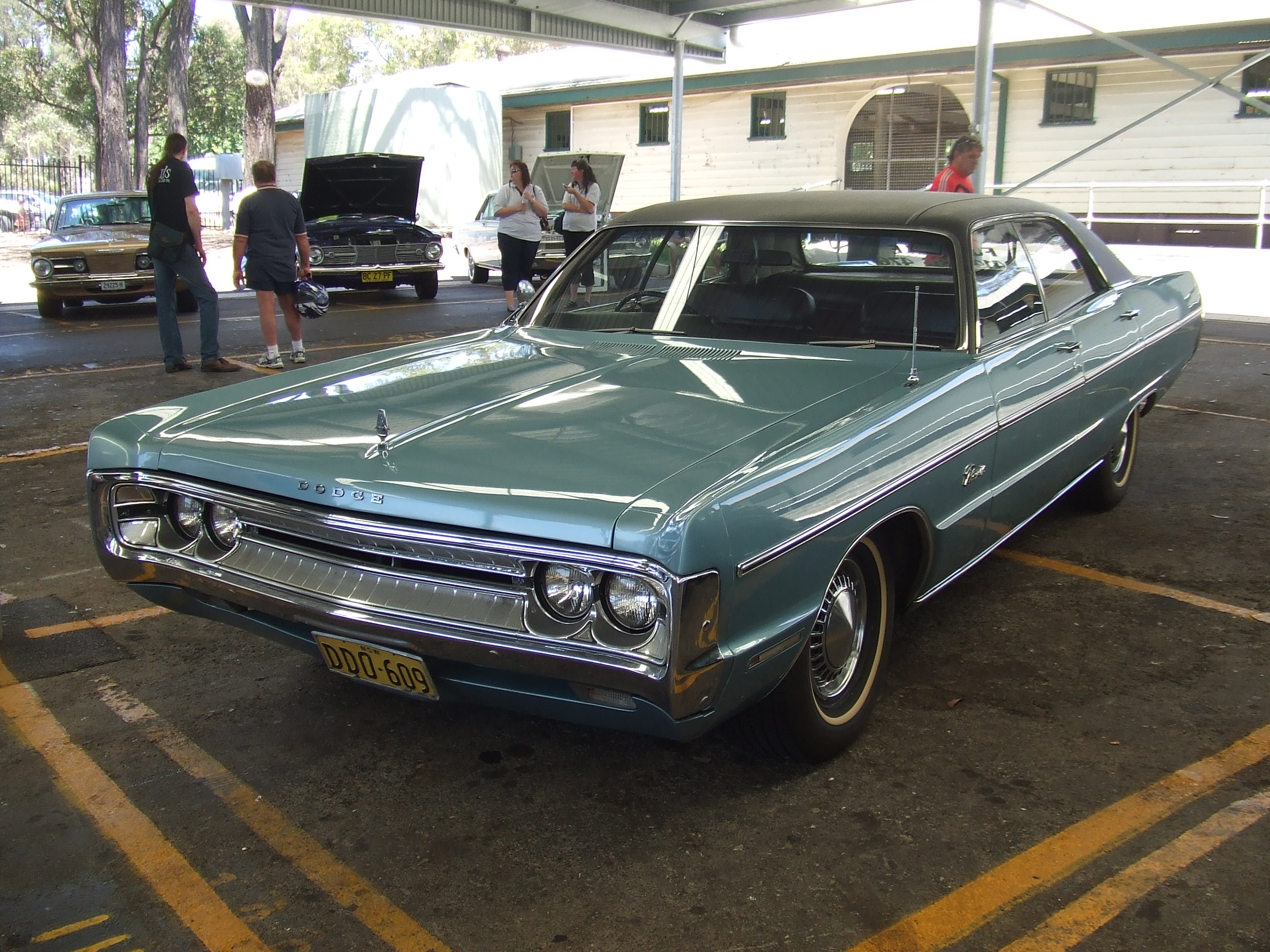
Dodge DG Phoenix hardtop
