= Dodge 440 =

American automobile built from 1962 to 1964

The Dodge 440 is a mid-size car that was marketed by Dodge from 1962 to 1964.

== Dodge Dart 440 (1962) ==
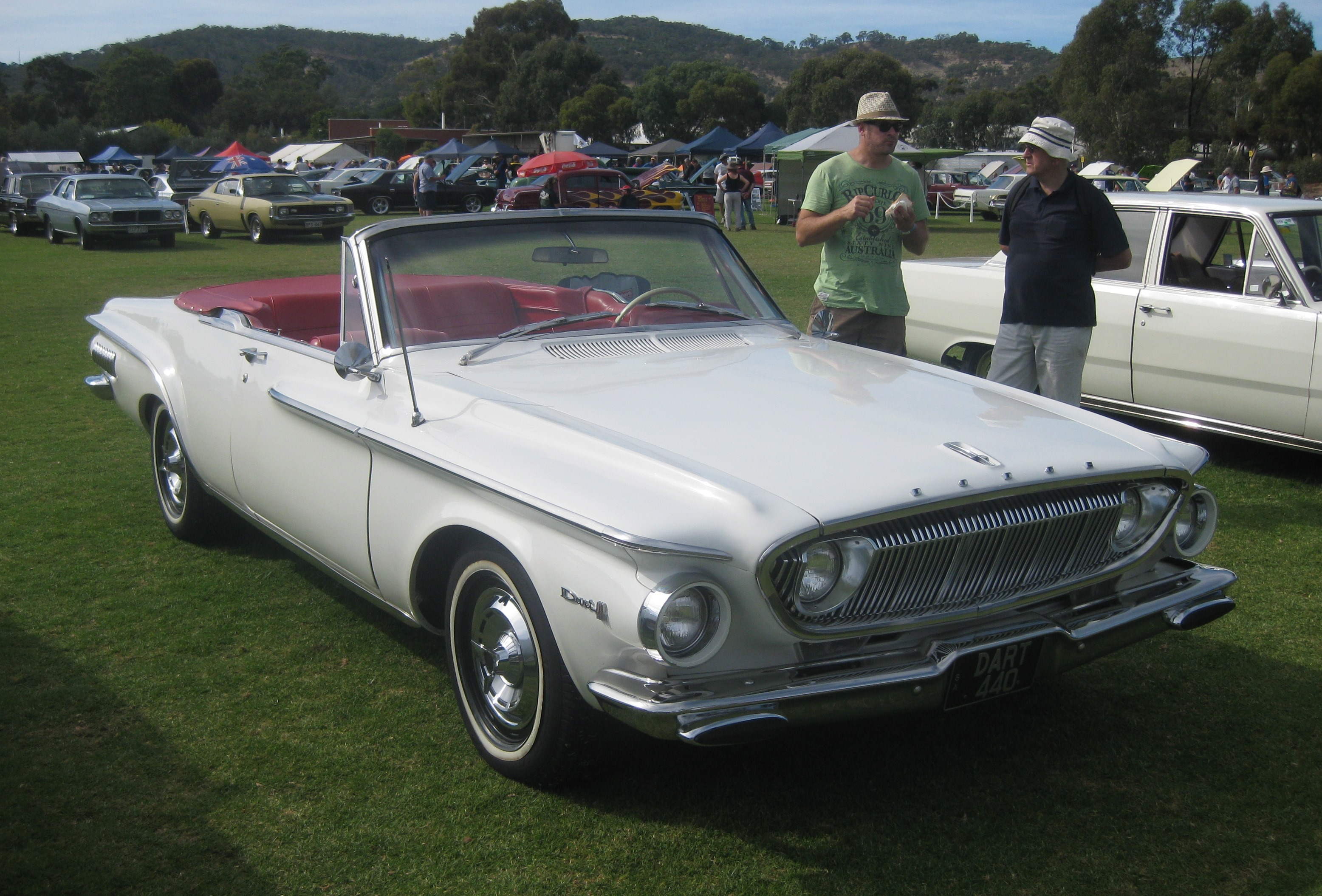
1962 Dodge Dart 440 convertible

Introduced in 1962, the Dodge Dart 440 model was the upmarket trim version of the Dodge Dart. Included was the standard equipment of the Dart and Dart 330, plus backup lights and exterior moldings. The Dart 440 was available as a 4-door sedan, 2-door hardtop, 4-door hardtop, 2-door convertible and 4-door station wagon. The Dart 440 used the 116-inch (2,946 mm) wheelbase shared with the Dart, Dart 330, and Polara 500.

Standard was the 225 cu in (3.7 L) slant-six producing 145 hp (108 kW; 147 PS). Claimed fuel economy in 1962 at a steady 40 mph was 24.1 mpg for the slant-6 engine. Optional were V8 engines that included the 318 cu in (5.2 L) 2-barrel Chrysler A, 361 cu in (5.9 L) 2-barrel, 383 cu in (6.3 L) 2-barrel and 4 barrel Chrysler B, as well as the 426 cu in (7.0 L) 4-barrel and dual 4-barrel Chrysler RB engines. Power seats were $96.

== Dodge 440 (1963–1964) ==
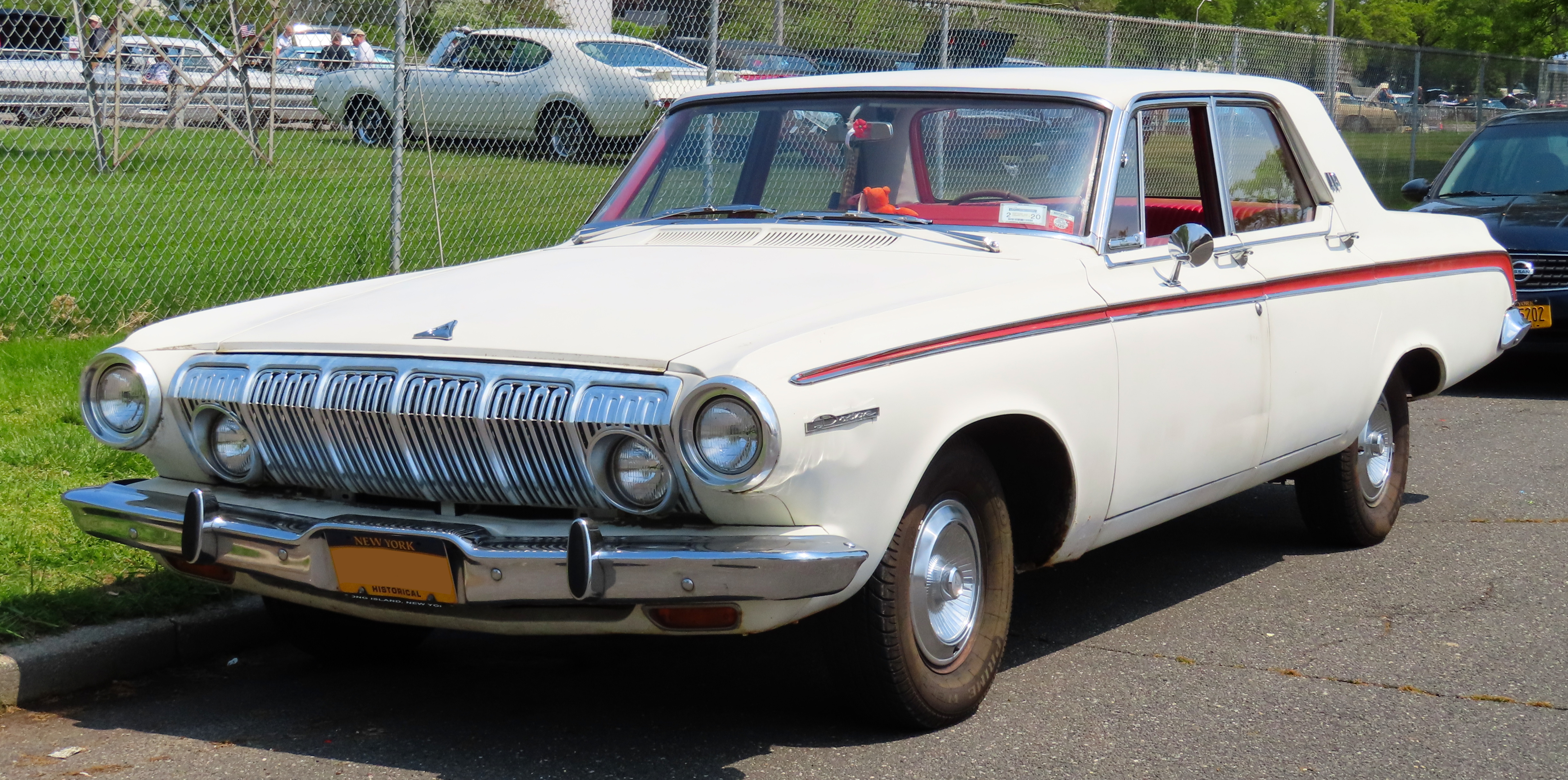
1963 Dodge 440 4-Door Sedan

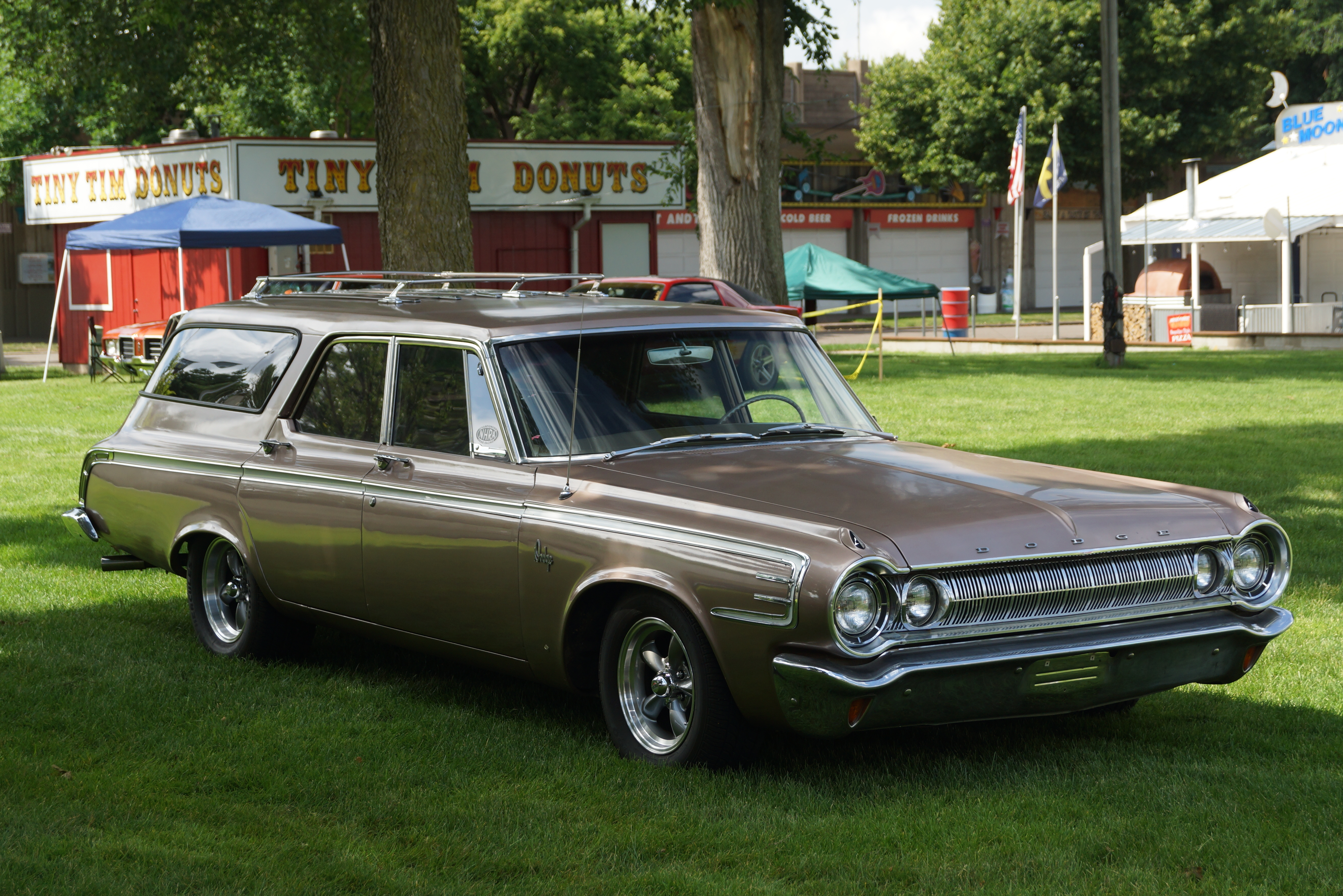
1964 Dodge 440 4-door Station Wagon (with after-market wheels)

From 1963 the 440 was separated from the new, smaller Dart range. It now featured a 119-inch wheelbase shared with the 330 and Polara and available as a 2-door sedan, 4-door sedan, 2-door hardtop and 4-door station wagon.

During 1963 and 1964 model years, the Dodge 440 was the mid-range model. It featured less chrome and a plainer interior than the top-trimed Polara.

For the 1965 model year, the 440, along with the 330 and 880 were all replaced by the Polara, which was built on the new C Body with 121-inch (3,073 mm) wheelbase. The 426 engine was also no longer available in full-size Dodges. However, the name 440 stayed on as a trim level of the Dodge Coronet.

== Canadian market ==
For the Canadian market, the mid-priced big Dodge was marketed as the Polara 440 for 1965 and 1966. This inaccuracy is without question the "440" in Dart 440 is not the engine size, as the 440 cubic inch motor didn't arrive in cars until 1967. 440 however was a trim level. The 440 was available in 1969 in the GTS package however.
