= Trelew massacre =

Mass execution in Argentina (1972)

- Part of the Dirty War
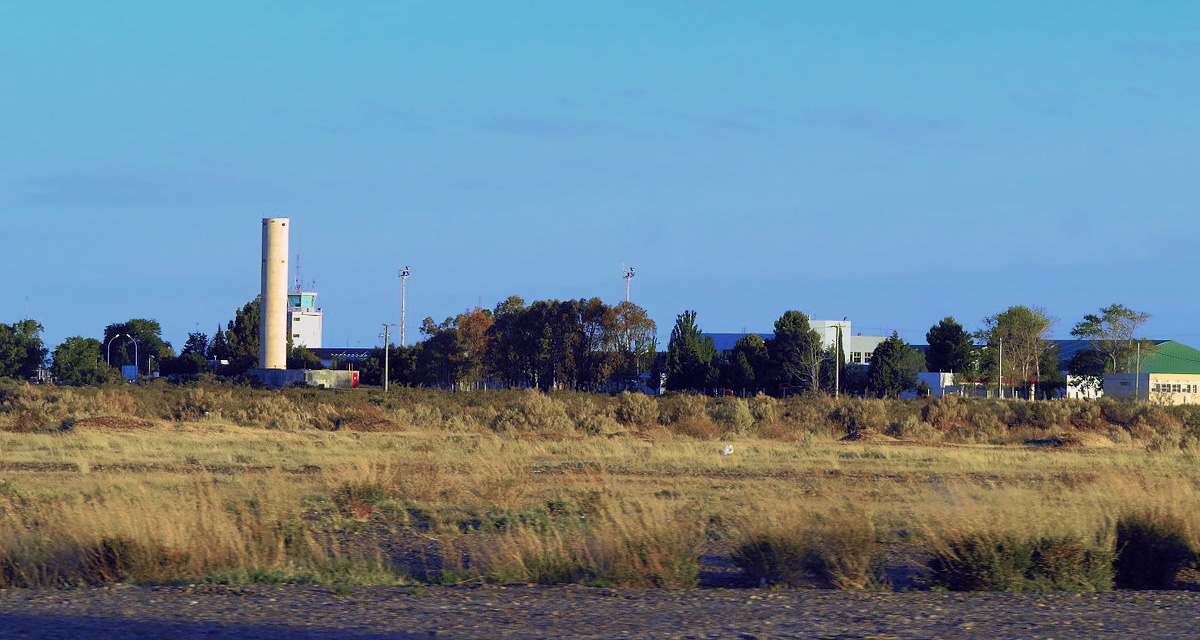
- Almirante Marcos A. Zar Airport
- Location: 43.2169°S 65.2697°W; Almirante Zar Aeronaval Base, Trelew, Chubut Province, Argentina
- Date: 22 August 1972; 03:30 a.m. (UTC−03:00)
- Target: Members of the left-wing guerrillas Montoneros, ERP and Fuerzas Armadas Revolucionarias (FAR)
- Attack type: Execution by firing squad
- Deaths: 16
- Injuries: 3
- Perpetrator: Argentine Navy
- Motive: Elimination of political dissidents following their successful escape from the Rawson Prison on 15 August and subsequent recapture

The Trelew Massacre was a mass execution of 16 political prisoners, militants of different Peronist and leftist organizations, in Rawson prison by the military dictatorship of Argentina. The prisoners were recaptured after an escape attempt and subsequently shot down by marines led by Lieutenant Commander Luis Emilio Sosa in a simulated new attempt to escape. The marines forced the prisoners to fake a new escape, then executed them as revenge by the Revolución Argentina for the successful escape of some of their comrades during the initial prison break. The massacre took place in the early hours of 22 August 1972 in the Almirante Marcos A. Zar Airport, an Argentine Navy airbase located near the city of Trelew, Chubut in Patagonia.

== Evasion ==
At 18:30 on 15 August 1972, 110 captured guerrillas attempted a massive escape from the prison at Rawson, the capital of Chubut Province in Argentina. In their escape, the guerrillas shot dead one guard (Gregorio Valenzuela) and another (Justino Galarraga) was critically wounded. Only six of the 110 inmates, which were members of the People's Revolutionary Army (ERP), Revolutionary Armed Forces (FAR) and Montoneros, succeeded. According to Galarraga (who survived by feigning death), Valenzuela was shot in the head as he lay wounded by Santucho's pregnant wife.

The mastermind and head of the operation was Mario Roberto Santucho, leader of the Workers' Revolutionary Party, although some reports claim that Marcos Osatinsky (FAR) had conceived a plan to escape from the prison before Santucho's arrival. These two leaders, along with Fernando Vaca Narvaja, Roberto Quieto, Enrique Gorriarán Merlo and Domingo Menna, made up the so-called Leakage Committee, and were the only ones able to escape, thanks to a waiting Ford Falcon, and reach Trelew airport where an Austral BAC One-Eleven airliner, previously hijacked by a guerrilla group of supporters disguised as passengers, waited to fly the escapees to neighboring Chile, then ruled by socialist President Salvador Allende.

Other vehicles, which should have been waiting for the rest of the escapees, were not at the front of the prison due to a misunderstanding with the previously agreed-upon signals. However, a second group of 19 escapees managed to reach the airport on their own by commandeering three taxis, but arrived just in time to see the aircraft taking off.

== Recapture ==
Seeing their chance of escaping disappear, the group called a press conference and surrendered without resistance to the Navy military personnel that surrounded the area, hoping the presence of journalists and judicial authorities would pressure the government to guarantee their lives. A military patrol under the command of Lieutenant Commander Luis Emilio Sosa, deputy chief of the Naval Air Base Almirante Zar, led the recaptured prisoners via a public transport unit to that military facility. Rejecting the prisoners' request to return to Rawson Prison, Captain Sosa argued that the new site would be temporary but necessary, as the prison riot at Rawson was still going on. Unfortunately, judge Alejandro Godoy, the director of the Jornada newspaper, the deputy director of the El Chubut newspaper, LU17 director Hector "Pepe" Castro and lawyer Mario Abel Amaya, all of whom accompanied the prisoners as guarantors for their safety, were not allowed to enter with them under the excuse that the number of people was too large, and were forced to leave.

The spectacular escape attempt and partial success of the six top guerrilla leaders, who later managed to travel from Chile to Cuba, had the military government of the self-proclaimed Argentine Revolution and the public in suspense for tense days. The general feeling was that bloody reprisals would occur if the six escaped rebel leaders were not returned to Argentina. Because of this perception, on the morning of 17 August, the Justicialist Party sent a telegram to Minister of Interior Arturo Mor Roig (part of the Radical Party board) stating that they demanded respect for the human rights of the political prisoners in the Rawson unit, and that he would be made responsible for all the prisoners' safety and well-being.

== Shooting ==
While the government of Alejandro Agustin Lanusse tried to push the Chilean president Salvador Allende into deporting the political escapees as criminals, the whole area of Rawson and Trelew were virtually occupied by Army and Gendarmerie personnel, who were patrolling continuously and made additional escape attempts impossible. The air base in Trelew maintained a large force of 3,000 troops from the Navy. In such a high tension climate, members of the Chiefs of Staff of the armed forces, employees and ministers met on the night of 21 August at the Government House. They did not provide any information to waiting news reporters.

At 03:30 on 22 August, at the Almirante Zar Naval Base, the 19 detainees were suddenly awakened and led out of their cells. According to the testimony of the three surviving prisoners, they were forced to lie face down and were gunned down by a patrol under Lieutenant Commander Luis Emilio Sosa, and lieutenant Roberto Bravo. Most died on the spot, while the injured were each given a coup de grâce.

The official version of events indicated that a new escape attempt had occurred, with 16 dead and three wounded among the prisoners, but no casualties in the ranks of the Navy.

That night, the government sanctioned Law 19.797, banning any dissemination of information regarding guerrilla organizations. In the following days, demonstrations took place in major cities of Argentina, and a number of bombs were placed in government offices to protest the killings.

Those killed were:

- Alejandro Ulla (PRT-ERP)
- Alfredo Kohon (FAR)
- Ana María Villarreal de Santucho 'Sayo' (PRT-ERP)
- Carlos Alberto del Rey (PRT-ERP)
- Carlos Astudillo (FAR)
- Clarisa Lea Place (PRT-ERP)
- Eduardo Capello (PRT-ERP)
- Humberto Suárez (PRT-ERP)
- Humberto Toschi (PRT-ERP)
- José Ricardo Mena (PRT-ERP)
- María Angélica Sabelli (Montoneros)
- Mariano Pujadas (Montoneros)
- Mario Emilio Delfino (PRT-ERP)
- Miguel Ángel Polti (PRT-ERP)
- Pedro Bonet (PRT-ERP)
- Susana Lesgart (Montoneros)

Survivors:

- Alberto Miguel Camps (FAR - Disappeared in 1977)
- María Antonia Berger (FAR - Disappeared in 1979)
- Ricardo René Haidar (Montoneros - Disappeared in 1982)

== Retaliation ==
On 30 April 1973, rear admiral Hermes Quijada, who headed the press conference which circulated the military version of an alleged second escape attempt, was gunned down in Buenos Aires by ERP-22 de Agosto guerrillas. Quijada was driving in his car when two guerrillas riding a motorbike in tandem intercepted him and the pillion opened fire with his Halcón ML-63 submachine gun, landing six shots on Quijada before being shot in the stomach by his chauffeur.

On 22 August 1973, the first anniversary of the Trelew massacre, 150 demonstrators were arrested and four policemen injured, apparently by gasoline bombs. On the second anniversary of the massacre, ERP guerrillas attacked a police station in Virreyes and seriously wounded a policeman. That same day, a dozen bombs were set off in Córdoba and La Plata. On 21 August 1975, left-wing gunmen in the city of Cordoba attacked the central police headquarters with automatic fire and bombed the police radio communications centre, killing five policemen and wounding another four. Two days later, Montoneros guerrillas set off an underwater demolition charge in the engine room of the Argentinian destroyer Santísima Trinidad, causing extensive damage but no casualties. On the fourth anniversary of the killings, two busloads of left-wing guerrillas attacked a highway police station in Buenos Aires suburb of Florencio Varela, and ten bombs exploded at street corners and subway stations, injuring three people.

== Legacy ==
The Argentine Secretary for Human Rights from 2003 to 2012, Eduardo Luis Duhalde, who represented some of the 19 left-wing guerrillas that had been captured, said about the massacre:

As a lawyer, it is the most impotent I have ever felt. Under a dictatorship there is no rule of law, and therefore my role was demoted to that of an observer.

== See also ==
- List of massacres in Argentina
