= ERP-22 de Agosto =

Argentinian guerrilla splinter group

Ejercito Revolucionario del Pueblo ERP-22 de Agosto
- Active regions: Argentina
- Ideology: Marxism–Leninism; Anti-revisionism; Left-wing Peronism; Socialist patriotism
- Status: Disbanded

The ERP-22 de Agosto was an Argentinian guerrilla splinter group of the Military Committee of the Federal District of the People's Revolutionary Army (ERP), established as a result of tactical divergences regarding the organization's position before the general elections of March 11, 1973.

== Reasons of the split ==
As the campaign for the 1973 presidential elections progressed, in which Peronism presented the Cámpora-Solano Lima formula, the Revolutionary Workers Party (PRT, the ERP party) continued to denounce Perón as a "tool of the bourgeois regime". ERP members who disagreed with this position were separated after the meeting of the Central Committee in December 1972 (the first in which Mario Santucho was present after returning from his exile in Cuba), in which they concluded that It was impossible to continue within the organization. There were also other ERP members who separated from the organization for other reasons.

== Foundation of ERP-22 ==
On January 15, 1973, at a campsite in Buenos Aires, the ERP-August 22 held its founding congress. Almost all of its militants from the Buenos Aires Regional and the Military Committee of the ERP Capital. The initial structure of the ERP-22 was a copy of the command line that the splinters had when they were part of the ERP. In addition, the new ERP-22 made no distinction between party and army, leaving its name linked to the latter. On March 8, 1978, the Eduardo Capello Command published a statement speaking and encouraging Argentine society to vote in favor of FREJULI, in the elections of March 11, 1973, calling the people "to defeat the dictatorship at the polls, through the mass vote to the FREJULI lists "and" mobilize to verify compliance with these modifications. "The sympathy and the workers' and people's support that awakens is the one that brings together the greatest possibilities of defeating the government maneuver at the polls".

The date of the name refers to the day of 1972 in which the first large-scale joint operation of the ERP, Montoneros and Peronist Armed Forces (FAP) guerrillas took place in order to free many of their main chiefs imprisoned in Rawson. On November 11, 1973, the group also organized a tribute to the villero leader of the San Pablo neighborhood and militant Nemesio Aquino, a well-known local revolutionary and militant who the group describes as "the worker who knew how to embrace the ideas of revolutionary Marxism and build the organization political-military essential to galvanize the progress of the people in their struggle for power".

== Important armed actions ==
=== Kidnapping of Héctor Ricardo García ===
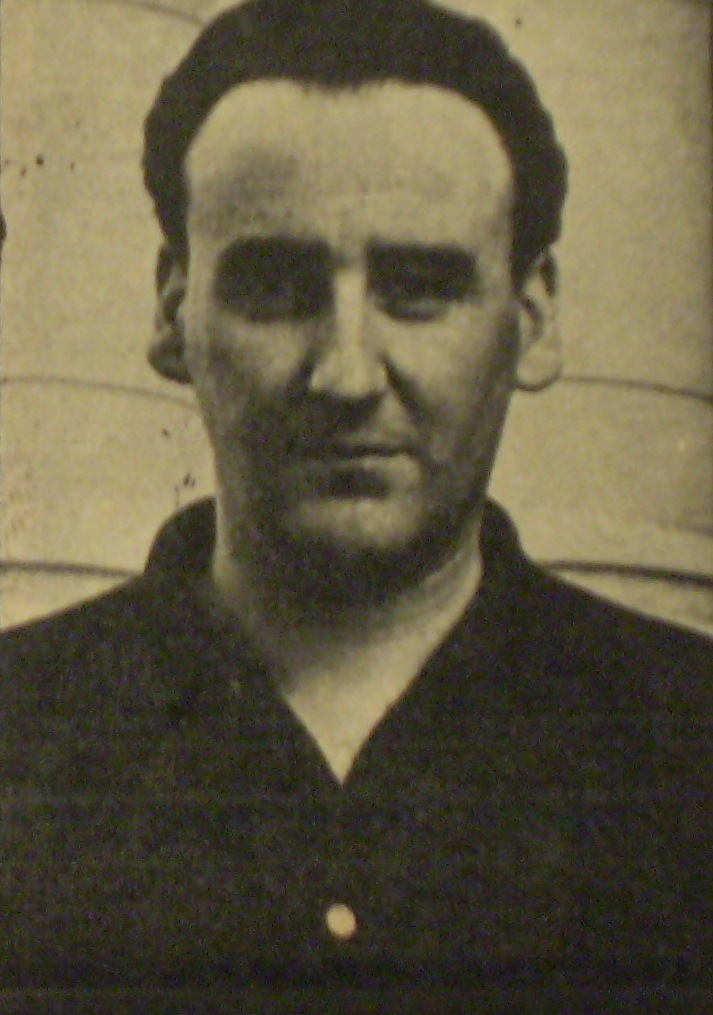
Media businessman Héctor Ricardo García, owner of Crónica, was kidnapped by the ERP-22 de Agosto

The first action of ERP-22 was the kidnapping of the owner of the newspaper Crónica, Héctor Ricardo García. It was called "Operation Poniatowski" because one of the guerrillas had read about a French politician named Michel Poniatowski and, in contrast to the common Spanish surname García, on 22 he puts that name to the operation.

Operation Poniatowski is planned for March 6, 1973, but due to problems in one of the cars, it is postponed to day 8, when it is actually executed, under the responsibility of Víctor José Fernández Palmeiro, known as "el Gallego". At 8:20 local time they park a van and descend three guerrillas dressed in work clothes and carrying boxes of whiskey. The van leaves and they avoid the obstacle of the doorman of the building where García lived because he was not there. Previously, four combatants had been distributed in the nearby square with concealed machine guns in case complications occurred. Garcia's maids opened them because they presented the card of the mayor of Buenos Aires, Saturnino Montero Ruiz, as the one who sent the gifts. The guerrillas reduced the staff and came to Garcia, who slept next to his partner, singer and actress Marina Dorel, and reassured him, while a female militant wore the uniform of one of the maids in case of the arrival of some unforeseen guest.

The ERP-22 required to release the publication, on the front page of the newspaper, of a statement calling to vote for FreJuLi. Garcia spoke with the director of the newspaper's evening edition to inform him of the statement he should publish. Then, the owner of Chronicle was taken to an ERP-22 dependent house, where he was held twelve hours until the newspaper edition came out, when he was released. At first it was believed that everything had been a maneuver to promote itself and although this theory was suggested, the editor knew that he had gone through a difficult experience and the ERP-August 22 had taken his first blow to affirm its independent existence.

=== Operation Maschwitz ===
In April 1973, the military dictatorship was falling apart. The president Lanusse orders the Army to go out on raking and control missions, especially in the Gran Buenos Aires. The ERP-22 decides to make fun of these operations by taking the town of Engineer Maschwitz, near the capital of the country.

The "Operation Maschwitz" was carried out on Saturday 21 April. At 9 o´clock, part of the twelve combatants who would be involved in the operation gathered at the Carupá station. There the weapons were distributed and uploaded on the vehicles (a Chevrolet 400, a Peugeot 504 and a Pick-Up F-100). Forty-five minutes later, Palmeiro's car enters the town, runs through it and then returns with the others. At 10.00 each of the operating groups marches to their positions: the first team, five militants, will take the police station; the second, two members, will take the mail and cancel the telegraph; The third with three will take care of the station and the fourth with two will cut the telephone lines.

The operation was carried out practically without incident. The objectives (shots, weapons capture and graffiti) were achieved and after that, the guerrillas withdrew. At the police station there was a prisoner who was released and returned the next day on his own. The government launched a swift operation to capture the guerrillas, but they were able to escape. There were no armed clashes with security forces.

=== Killing of counter admiral Quijada ===
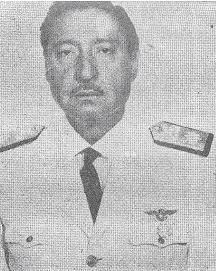
Hermes Quijada, a high ranking naval officer shot dead by the guerrilla ERP-22 to avenge the militants killed in the Trelew massacre

A few days before the inauguration of elected president Héctor Cámpora, the ERP-22 decided to launch a new action: the "Operation Mercury", whose objective was to kill Counter-admiral Hermes Quijada. This officer was a naval pilot who had been in charge of televised briefing on behalf of the FF. AA. explaining the Trelew massacre in 1972 to the public opinion.

At the beginning of April 1973, Intelligence of the ERP-22 had received information about the address of Quijada's house. The guerrillas proceeded to carry out several checks of the area, in order to study their safety and customs: they found as a problem the substantial custody at the nearby house of Minister Arturo Mor Roig, but they were able to determine that the officer usually left his house about the 8:30 and 9:30 in a white Dodge Polara driven by his chauffeur, and did not take a fixed route.

Again the responsibility of the operation fell to Víctor José Fernández Palmeiro aka “El Gallego”, who prepared a plan that consisted of following Quijada's car with a motorcycle (whose driver would receive a signal from a car parked on the direction taken by the Dodge Polara), the passenger would be the “Gallego”, who would jump from it and riddle Quijada with a Falcon submachine gun and then get on again and the driver swiftly take him out of the area . A first attempt was made, which failed because the militant in the parked car made the wrong signal to the motorcycle and it took another path. For this failure the operation was postponed until Monday, April 30.

The following week the operation would be effectively executed on Monday April 30. At 9:10 Quijada's vehicle started and was followed by the motorcycle with “El Gallego” and another militant in the drive seat. In the corner of Junín and Sarmiento streets, Quijada was gunned down, but his chauffeur and bodyguard shot the Palmiero in the stomach. The militants fled, but the car broke the gear lever. They were picked up by a support vehicle at the entrance of the Faculty of Law. An improvised surgical intervention was attempted on Palmiero but he finally died, not before learning about the success of the operation by radio. His last words were: "I avenged them!" The group describes the result of the attack and the death of El Gallego as "The newspapers of the time reported profusely about the death of Quijada. What they did not say, is that as of April 30, Victor José Fernández Palmeiro (El Gallego), now next to the sixteen martyrs of Trelew, began to live in the heart of his town. Palmiero became a martyr of the group and an icon for armed movements in Argentina during the 1970s.
