= Hermes Quijada =

Argentinian Navy admiral

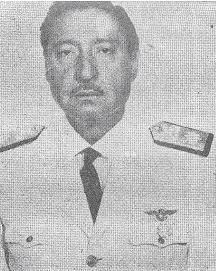
- Born: September 16, 1920
- Died: April 30, 1973 (aged 52)
- Military career
- Allegiance: Argentina
- Branch: Argentine Navy
- Rank: Admiral

Hermes José Quijada (16 September 1920 – 30 April 1973) was an Argentine naval pilot who reached the rank of Argentine Navy-admiral. He was killed by members of the Communist organization People's Revolutionary Army-22 de Agosto. Quijada was ambushed and shot with a submachine gun while riding on his car in Buenos Aires.

== Biography ==
Hermes Quijada was born in San Miguel de Tucumán. During his naval career, in 1949 he took part in the first helicopter flight by the Argentine Navy. Between 1961 and 1962, Quijada was the pilot of a C-47 Skytrain in what became the first flight from the Americas and the South Pole, where he landed.

On the night of 22 August 1972 Quijada appeared on Argentine television reading a communiqué issued by the military government stating the official justification of the killing of 16 captured guerrilla fighters by a Navy detail the previous night at the Almirante Zar Naval Base in Trelew.

=== Assasinaton ===
At the beginning of 1973, the ERP-22 (itself an offshoot from the ERP) decided to launch Operación Mercurio ("Operation Mercury") with the aim of avenging the Trelew massacre by killing Hermes Quijada. On the first days of April, the ERP-22's intelligence apparatus was tipped of the location of Quijada's residence and began periodically staking out the area so as to study his routines. Significant presence of police personnel guarding the nearby home of then-Interior Minister Arturo Mor Roig posed an initial obstacle, but the Communist militants were able to determine Quijada usually left his house every morning between 08:30 and 09:30 in a white Dodge Polara, with his chaffeur at the wheel and no fixed route.

The plan was devised by Víctor José Fernández Palmeiro (nicknamed El Gallego), who volunteered to take part in it, and called for him and another guerrilla to follow Quijada's car on a motorbike. A parked car would signal the two men on the direction chosen by Quijada's chaffeur and Fernández Palmeiro would ride pillion and fire his Halcón ML-63 before escaping. A miscommunication caused the failure of a first attempt and the attack was postponed.

At 09:10 on Monday 30 April, Quijada and his chaffeur left the former's home as usual, with the two guerrillas following them shortly after. Upon reaching the intersection of Junín and Sarmiento, Fernández Palmeiro opened fire on Quijada, whose driver returned fire with a pistol, mortally wounding Fernández Palmeiro. Both guerrillas escaped while Quijada's driver damaged the gearbox. Quijada was taken to the Naval Hospital in the neighbourhood of Caballito where he was later pronounced dead.

At the time of his death he held the rank of Rear Admiral and was posthumously promoted two days later to the next higher rank (Admiral) by Secret Law no. 20 339/73.

== Eponyms ==
An island in Argentine Antarctica has been named after him since 1978.

The Gobernador Ramón Trejo Noel International Airport and the Río Grande Air Naval Base in Río Grande bore his name until October 2009, when a judge ordered its removal at the behest of a lawsuit filed by human rights organisations.
