= Mario Abel Amaya =

Argentine lawyer and politician (1935–1976)

- Born: March 8, 1935; ARG Lower Valley of the Chubut River, Chubut, Argentina
- Died: 19 October 1976 (aged 41); Villa Devoto Prison, Argentina
- Occupation: Lawyer
- Years active: May 25, 1973-March 24, 1976
- Known for: Radical Civic Union
- Notable work: activist Lawyer

Mario Abel Amaya (August 3, 1935, Dolavon, Chubut - October 19, 1976, Buenos Aires) was an Argentine lawyer and politician, reformist activist at the university and a member of the Radical Civic Union that was arrested-disappeared in 1976 by the V Army Corps based in Bahía Blanca, dying as a result of the torture to which it was subjected. In 1973 he was elected a national deputy in his district of the Province of Chubut, holding office until the coup of March 24, 1976.

== Biography ==
Mario Abel Amaya was born in the Lower Valley of the Chubut River. His parents were rural teachers in Dolavon, and had migrated from the Province of San Luis in the 1920s. He attended primary and secondary school in Rawson. When he was 16 years old, in the elections of 1951, he approached the Radical Civic Union as a militant. He completed his university studies at the universities of Córdoba and Tucumán, where he maintained an active militancy in the reform movement. Upon receiving a lawyer, he settled in Trelew, installing his law firm together with Patricio "el Oso" Romero, a prominent Peronist leader. In 1976 Amaya was kidnapped while he was with Hipólito Solari Irigoyen, a former diploma. Amaya was tortured such that his mother could not recognize him in a Buenos Aires hospital.

Amaya was oriented to advise workers and unions. At the beginning of the decade of 1970, it begins to defend to political prisoners stopped in the prison of Rawson, standing out among them the union leader Agustín Tosco. In 1972 there was a flight of political prisoners from the Montonero guerrilla organizations and Revolutionary People's Army, during which a large group was trapped in the Trelew airport. On that occasion, the fugitives demanded the presence of radical lawyers Mario Amaya and Hipólito Solari Yrigoyen as a guarantee. A few days later several of the detainees would be killed in what is known as the Trelew Massacre. Shortly after Amaya was arrested by the dictatorship that governed at that time.

Since its inception, Amaya joined the Movement for Renewal and Change led by Raul Alfonsin, faced with the conservative line that dominated radicalism, headed by Ricardo Balbin. In 1973 he appeared in his province as a candidate for national deputy, winning and assuming May 25.

As a deputy he distinguished himself in the exercise of his mandate for the defense of public liberties, popular causes, and human rights. Amaya also attended incessantly to assemblies vindicating the ideals for which he fought with determination, celebrated in different parts of the country. As a product of their struggles, they began to appear on the blacklists of intolerance, which the information services themselves and their terrorist groups, such as the Triple A, made public with the purpose of intimidation.
