= Dodge Polara =

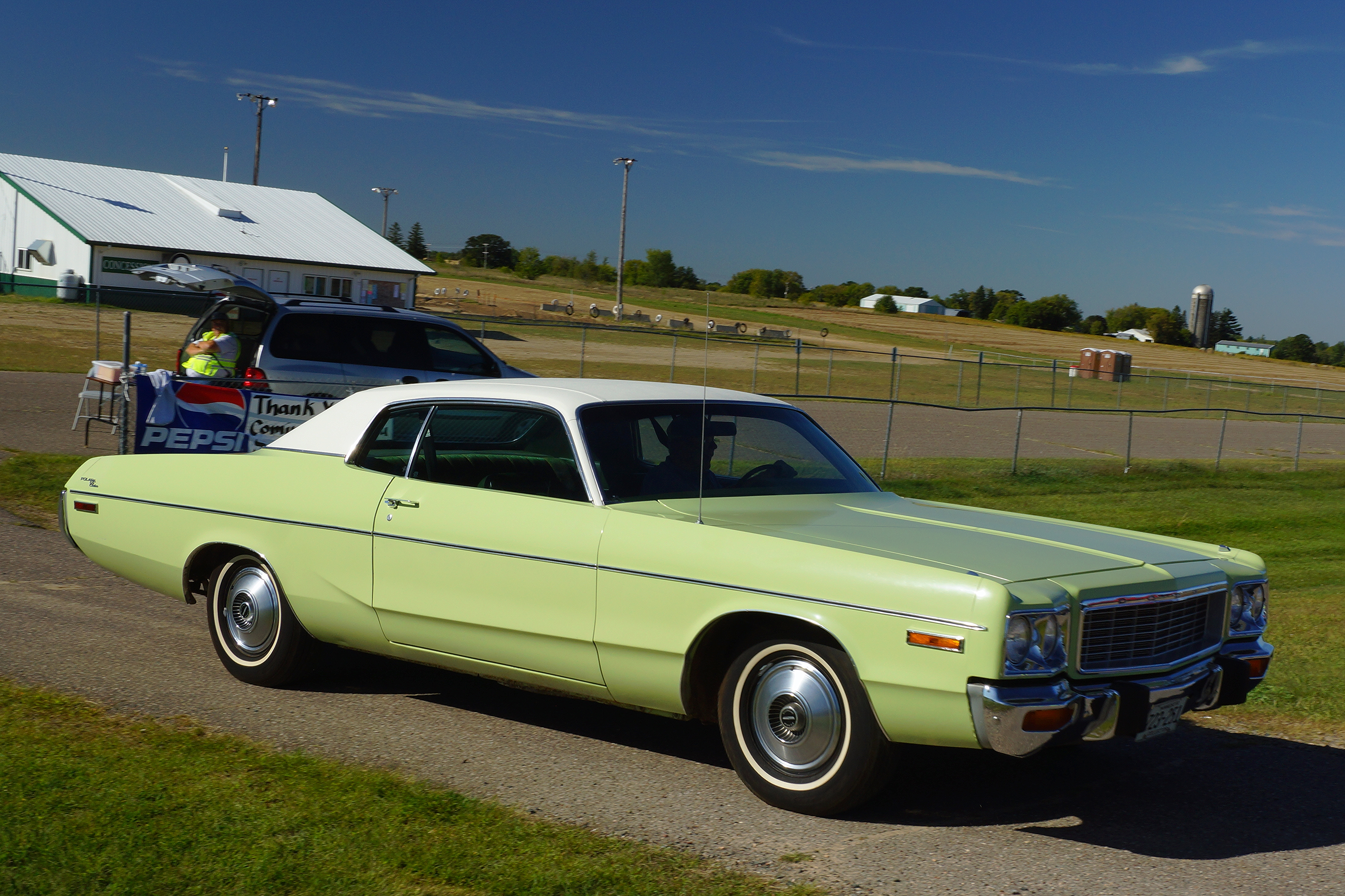
- 1973 Dodge Polara 2-door hardtop

Overview
- Manufacturer: Dodge (Chrysler)
- Model years: 1960–1973

Body and chassis
- Class: Full-size (1960–1961, 1965–1973); Mid-size (1962–1964)
- Layout: FR layout

Chronology
- Predecessor: Dodge Coronet (1959 full-size)
- Successor: Dodge Monaco/Royal Monaco

The Dodge Polara is an automobile introduced in the United States for the 1960 model year as Dodge's top-of-the-line full-size car. After the introduction of the Dodge Custom 880 in 1962, the Polara nameplate designated a step below the full-sized best-trimmed Dodge model; the Polara that year had been downsized to what was in effect intermediate, or mid-size status. In its various forms, the Polara name was used by Dodge until 1973, when its position in Dodge's line-up was replaced by the Dodge Monaco/Royal Monaco.

The name Polara is a reference to the Polaris star in a marketing attempt to appeal to the excitement surrounding the Space Race during the early 1960s.

== 1960–1961 ==
First generation
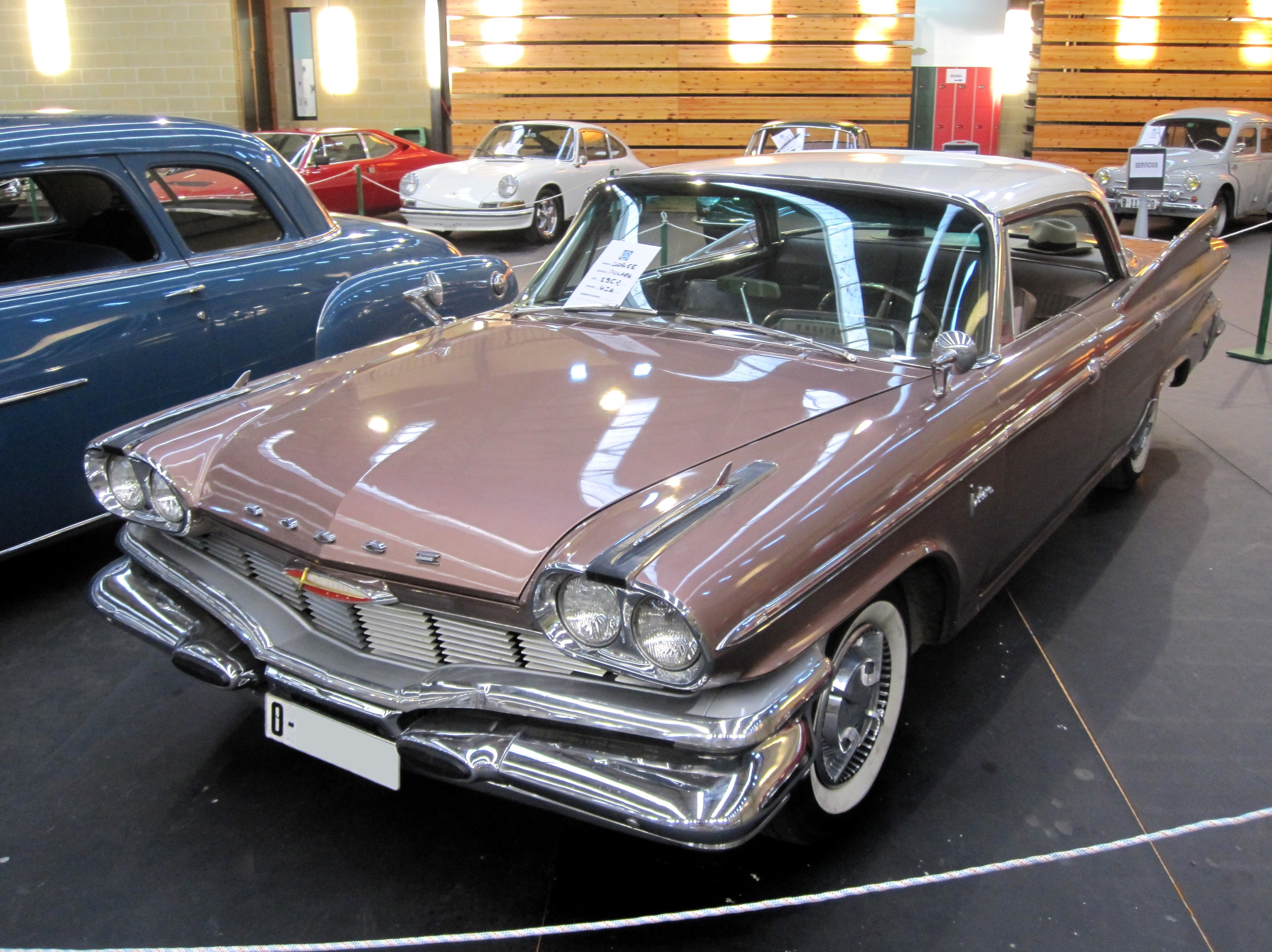
- 1960 Dodge Polara 4-door hardtop

Overview
- Model years: 1960–1961
- Assembly: United States: Hamtramck, Michigan (Dodge Main Factory)

Body and chassis
- Body style: 4-door sedan 4-door wagon 2-door convertible 2-door hardtop 4-door hardtop 4-door hardtop station wagon
- Related: Dodge Dart; Plymouth Belvedere

Powertrain
- Engine: 383 cu in (6.3 L) V8; 361 cu in (5.9 L) V8
- Transmission: 2-speed PowerFlite auto 3-speed manual

Dimensions
- Wheelbase: 118 in (2,997 mm); 122 in (3,099 mm)
- Length: 214 in (5,436 mm); 217 in (5,512 mm)
- Curb weight: 3,880 lb (1,760 kg) approx.

The 1960 Polara and other full-sized Dodges featured styling cues carried over from 1959 models, itself an evolution of Virgil Exner's "Forward Look" cars introduced in 1957. The 1960 model year also marked the first year that all Chrysler models, except for the Imperial, used unibody construction.

The top-of-the-line Polara and Dodge Matador continued to use the 122 in (3,099 mm) wheelbase of their predecessors, while a new line-up of still full-sized Dodge Darts rode on a shorter 118 in (2,997 mm) wheelbase shared with Plymouth. The Polara was available as a two-door convertible, two-door hardtop, four-door hardtop sedan, four-door hardtop station wagon, and conventional (pillared) four-door sedan.

The 1960 full-sized Dodges continued with the make's styling hallmarks of stacked "jet pod" tail lights. However, the size of the lights was significantly increased compared to the previous year's lamps, with the lower lights set into the rear bumper. The design also incorporated Dodge's trademark shortened tail fins, which, on the Polara, included small vertical tail light lenses placed on the vertical surface at the back of the fin. The clipped fin tended to visually exaggerate the length of the "jet pods" that housed the taillights.

The fins on the Darts were shorter both in length and height because unlike the full-sized Dodge's, the Polara and Matador, the Darts were based on the Plymouth and utilized much of the Plymouth's sheet metal form. The Plymouth back door did not include any part of the rear fin, whereas, on the full-sized Dodges, the fin started on the rear door (on the four-door models) and continued to the back of the car. This allowed the fin to start on the door and end sooner, relative to the tip of the round tail light, and still appear as long or longer than on the Dart. The front end featured a small grille of eight stacks of anodized aluminum rectangles nested in a massive chrome front bumper assembly. As the top model in the line-up, the Polara featured better interior fabrics and trim treatments. The Polaras also received more exterior trim that included chrome stone guards aft of the rear wheel housings, a full-length chrome spear, and a broad chrome base to the chrome spear atop the headlight housings.

For 1961, Dodge dropped the Matador, leaving the Polara as the sole "senior" Dodge model. Darts on the shorter wheelbase continued. For 1961, Exner's styling department reversed the car's fins, making them taller as they flowed toward the rear window. As the fins sloped towards the rear of the car, they cut slightly towards the center (to allow the single tail light housing on each side) of the rear of the vehicle, wrapping downward and then back along the side fender to form a C-shaped line accentuated in chrome. The overall effect made the car's rear seem to "pucker" from the angles the design created. The massive front bumper treatments that had been a Dodge hallmark since 1957 were replaced with a simple bar design, above which was a massive concave grille shared with the Dodge Dart.

The 1961 styling overhaul of the Dodge line-up was different from anything else on the US market at that time (save the 1961 Plymouth) and consumers turned away from the 1961 restyle. Sales of full-size Dodges plunged to their lowest levels since the firm's founding in 1914, with only 14,032 units produced in the United States. For the second straight year, the Dart carried the make, with sales of 142,000 units. However, Dodge sales for 1961 were down 53% compared to 1960, dropping the make from sixth in the American market to ninth place.

A total of 1,236 units were part of a special order for the State of California Highway Patrol produced in the 999 trim code. The four-door sedans were essentially low-cost models equipped similarly to Dodge Dart standards, including rubber floor mats, gray vinyl interiors, and limited chrome trim. California officials insisted on a longer wheelbase police pursuit vehicle rather than using the smaller wheelbase Dodge Dart. A 383 high-output V8 provided power with a 413 camshaft and four-barrel Carter carburetor.

The bodyshells that were used for the 1961 Polaras were then reused the following year by the sedan and convertible models of the 1962 Chryslers. These 1962 Chryslers were created by mating the front ends of updated 1961 Chryslers to the corresponding (and now de-finned) 1961 Polara bodies. The 1962 Chrysler station wagons were created similarly, except the body of a full-sized 1961 Plymouth four-door wagon was used instead.

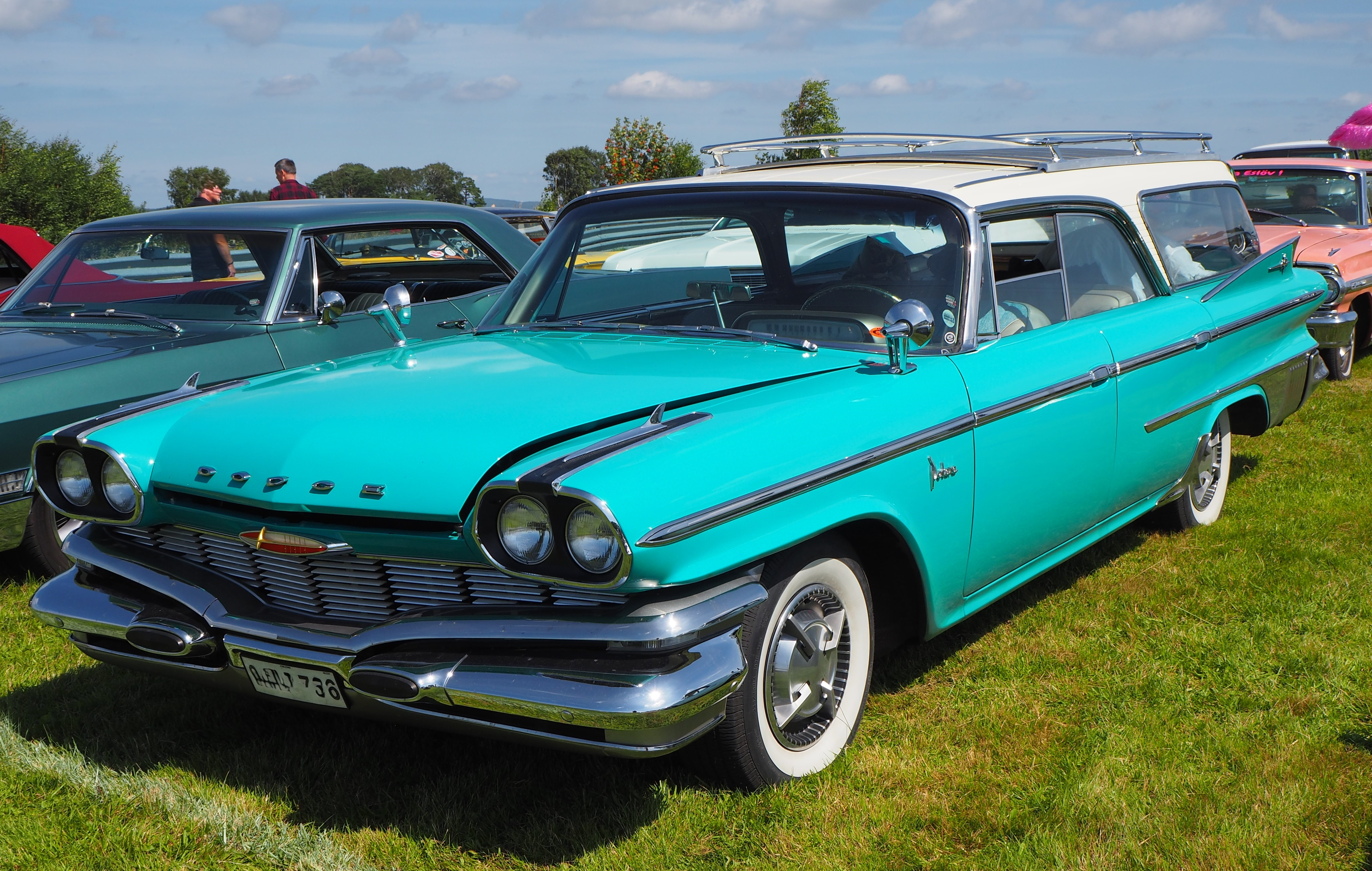
1960 Dodge Polara Station Wagon

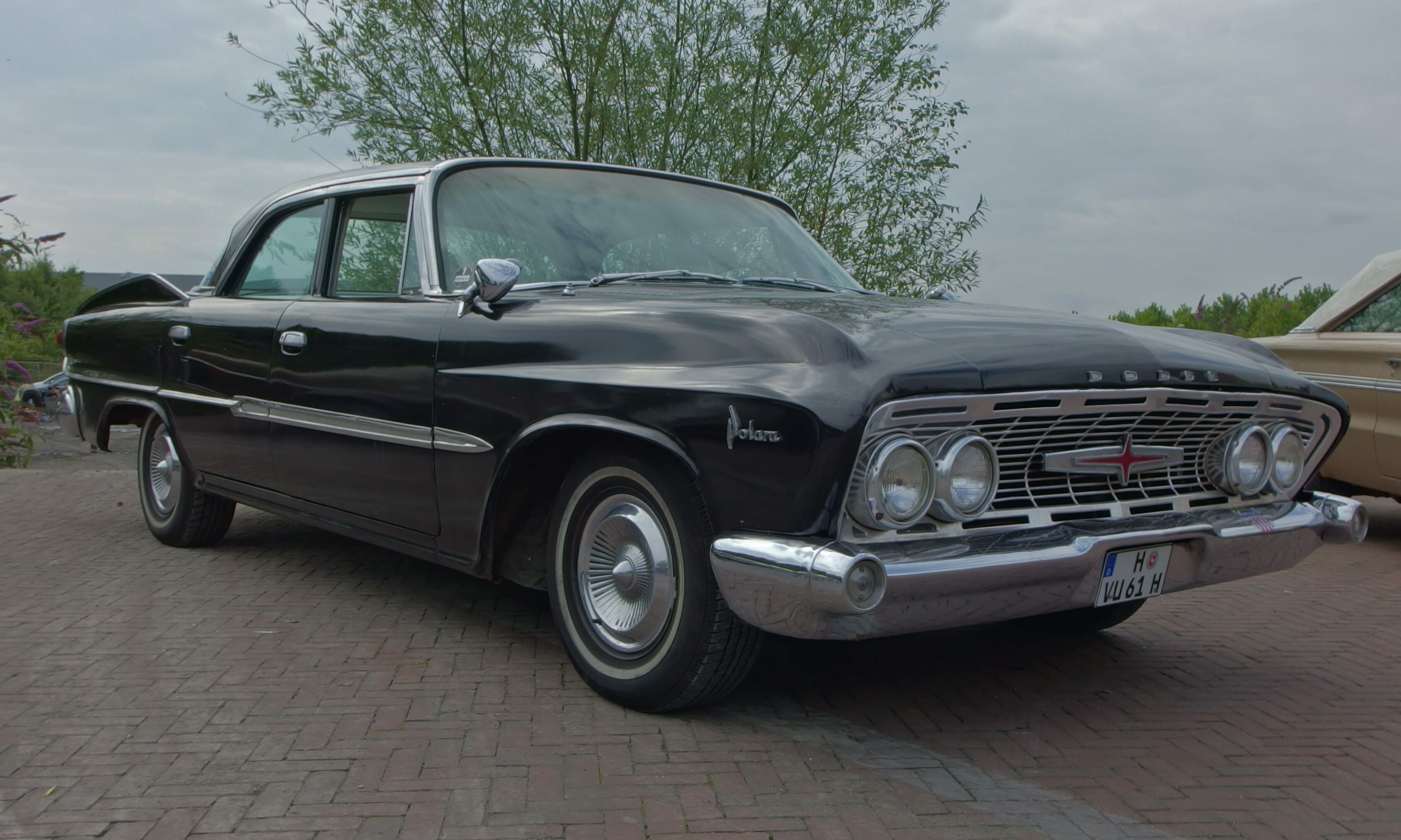
1961 Dodge Polara 4-door sedan

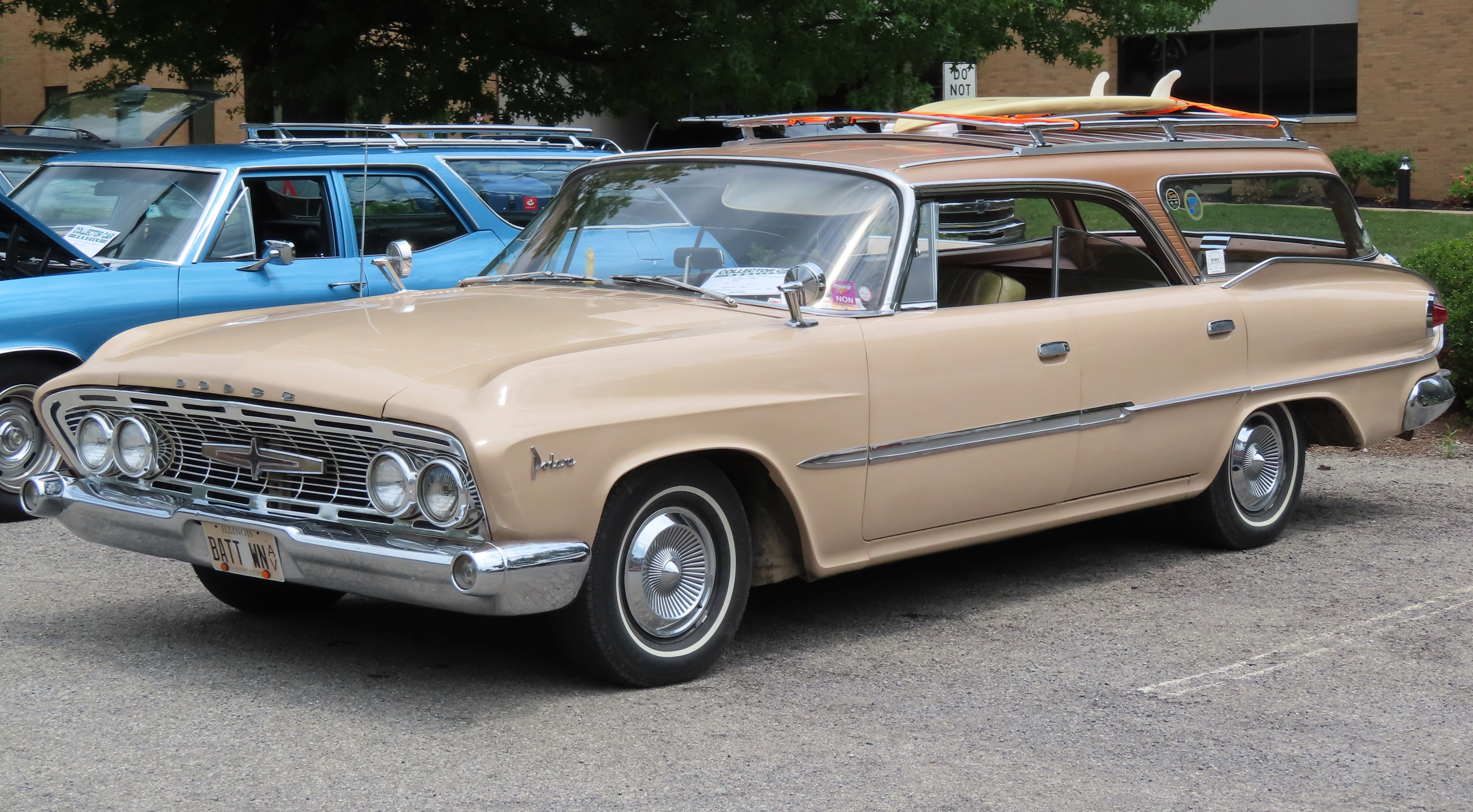
1961 Dodge Polara hardtop wagon, front view

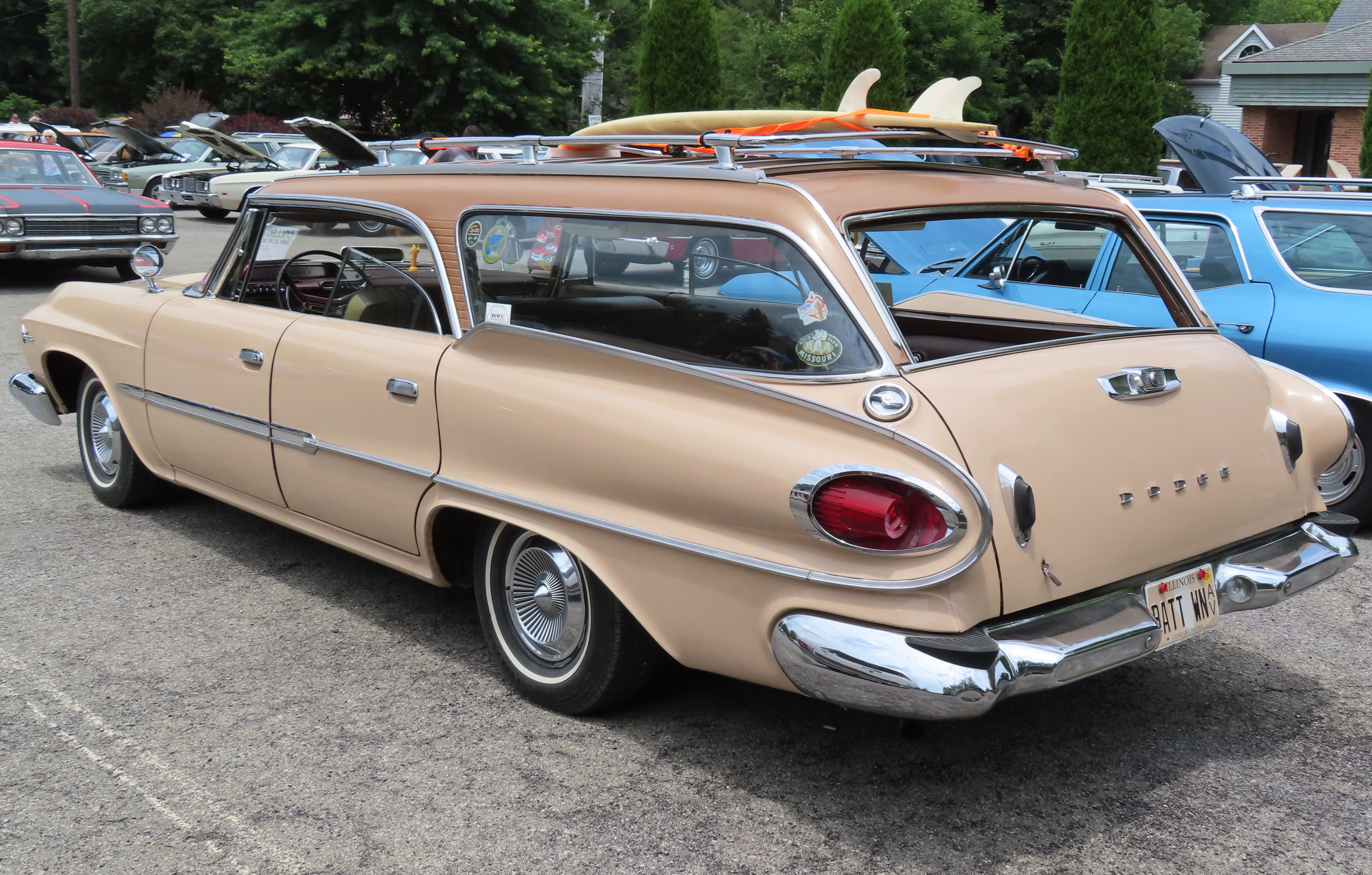
1961 Dodge Polara hardtop wagon, rear view

== 1962–1964 ==
Second generation
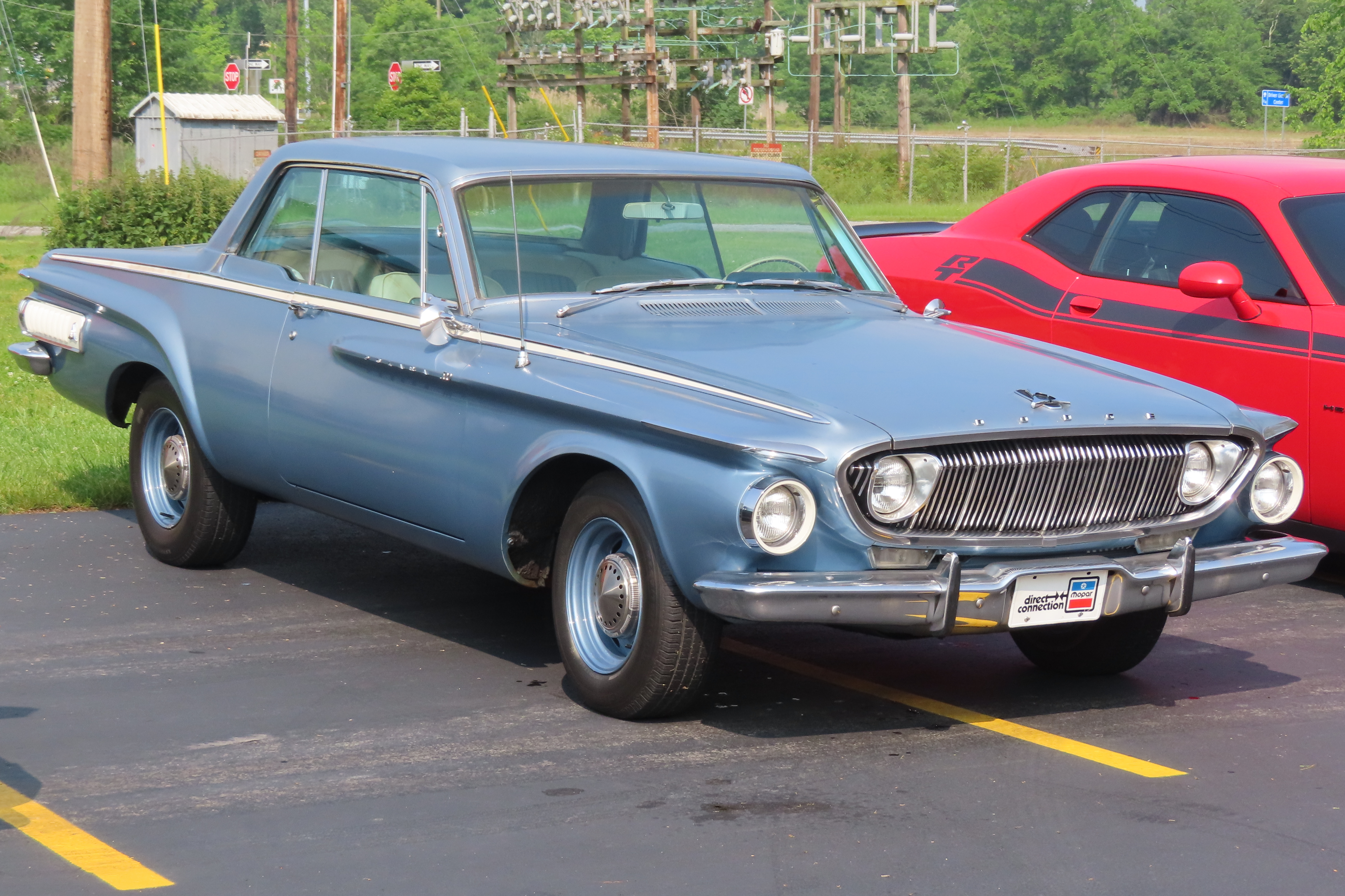
- 1962 Dodge Polara 500 2-Door Hardtop

Overview
- Model years: 1962–1964
- Assembly: United States: Hamtramck, Michigan (Dodge Main Factory)

Body and chassis
- Body style: 2-door sedan (1963–1964); 4-door sedan (1963–1964); 4-door wagon (1963–1964); 2-door convertible (1962–1964); 2-door hardtop (1962–1964); 4-door hardtop (1962–1964)
- Platform: B-body
- Related: Dodge Dart (1962); Plymouth Fury

Powertrain
- Engine: 225 cubic inches (3.7 L) slant-6 I6; 318 cubic inches (5.2 L) A V8; 361 cubic inches (5.9 L) B V8; 383 cubic inches (6.3 L) B V8; 413 cubic inches (6.8 L) B V8; 426 cubic inches (7.0 L) RB V8
- Transmission: 2-speed automatic 3-speed manual

Dimensions
- Wheelbase: 1962: 116 in (2,946 mm); 1963–1964: 119 in (3,023 mm)
- Length: 208.1 in (5,285.7 mm)

Chronology
- Successor: Dodge Coronet (mid-size 1965)

All Dodge models were redesigned with smaller, lighter, sculpted bodies on 116 in (2,946 mm) wheelbases for 1962. This was the first Chrysler B-Body. This move came after Chrysler's president overheard and misunderstood Chevrolet chief Ed Cole to have said Chevrolet's largest cars would be downsized for 1962. Chrysler designers were forced to take the planned 1962 Dodge full-size line and shorten the design to fit a more compact wheelbase in a last-minute effort to compete with what was supposed to be a smaller new Chevrolet. However, GM was developing a new mid-sized automobile that would become the 1964 Chevelle, but continued to offer its line of traditional full-size cars for 1962. As a result, Dodge and Plymouth were marketing smaller cars that the public and motoring press found stylistically awkward.

The new Dodge models were sized closer to Ford's new intermediate Fairlane than to Ford's or GM's new "A-body" models. As a result, development was accelerated for a new full-size car, using the front end from the 1961 Dodge Polara and the body from the 1962 Chrysler Newport. This new full-size model became the Custom 880 and was Dodge's top-of-the-line model when it was introduced on January 21, 1962. In 1963, a lower specification version was offered, the Dodge 880.

Among the B-Bodied 1962 Dodges was a bucket-seated sporty model called the Polara 500. It was available as a two-door hardtop and a convertible, and a four-door hardtop was added in December. Standard equipment included a 305 hp (227 kW; 309 PS) 361 cu in (5.9 L) V8 with four-barrel carburetion and dual exhaust. Positioned beneath the Polara 500 in descending order were the Dart 440 and the Dart 330. For the 1962 model year, there was no model named "Polara". These models were marketed in Canada as the Dodge 440 and Dodge 330, and a Canada-only base model Dodge 220 was also offered.

The Dodges were available with optional V8 engines of up to 413 cu in (6.8 L). These mid-sized Dodges (and similar models from Plymouth) competed successfully as stock cars in NASCAR races and in stock-automatic classes in drag racing, where their smaller size and lighter weight gave them an advantage over the larger cars from Ford and General Motors.

The basic body of the 1962 model continued until 1964, revised and lengthened by the new Chrysler vice president of styling Elwood Engel. The Polara range eventually included a four-door sedan. For 1963 and 1964, the Polara 500 was available only as a convertible or hardtop coupé.

For the 1963 model year, the wheelbase was increased to 119 inches (3,023 mm) and the car received new sheet metal. The Dart name was reassigned to Dodge's line of compact cars that had previously been known as the Dodge Lancer. Positioned below the Polara were the 440 and 330 trim models. The 1964 models received a revised front end and new tail lamps to distinguish them from the 1963 cars. The Chevrolet Impala inspired the rear-end treatment, and the Polara models now featured six small, square-shaped taillights (three on each side) surrounded by a bright trim panel. Lower-trimm models mid-size Dodges only had four taillights (two on each side) and lacked the bright trim panel. A new "C" pillar for the hardtop coupes, combined with the revised front and rear-end styling, made the 1964s look new, resulting in a significant increase in sales over 1963.

The Polara 500 continued as Dodge's sporty mid-size model, competing with the full-size Ford Galaxie 500/XL and Chevrolet's Impala Super Sport, featuring an engine-turned anodized aluminum trim strip along the car's flanks as well as bucket seats and deluxe vinyl upholstery.

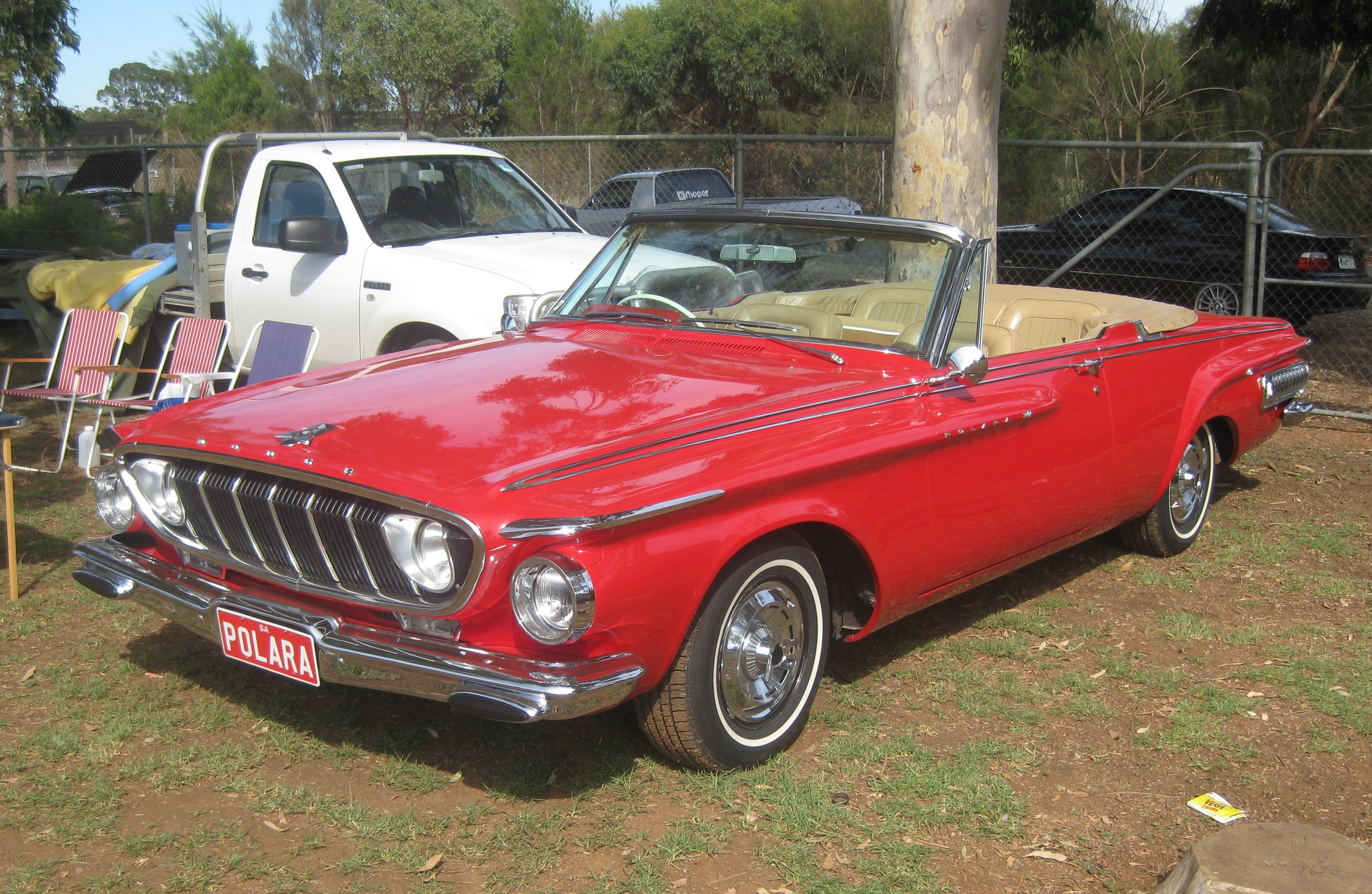
1962 Dodge Polara 500 convertible

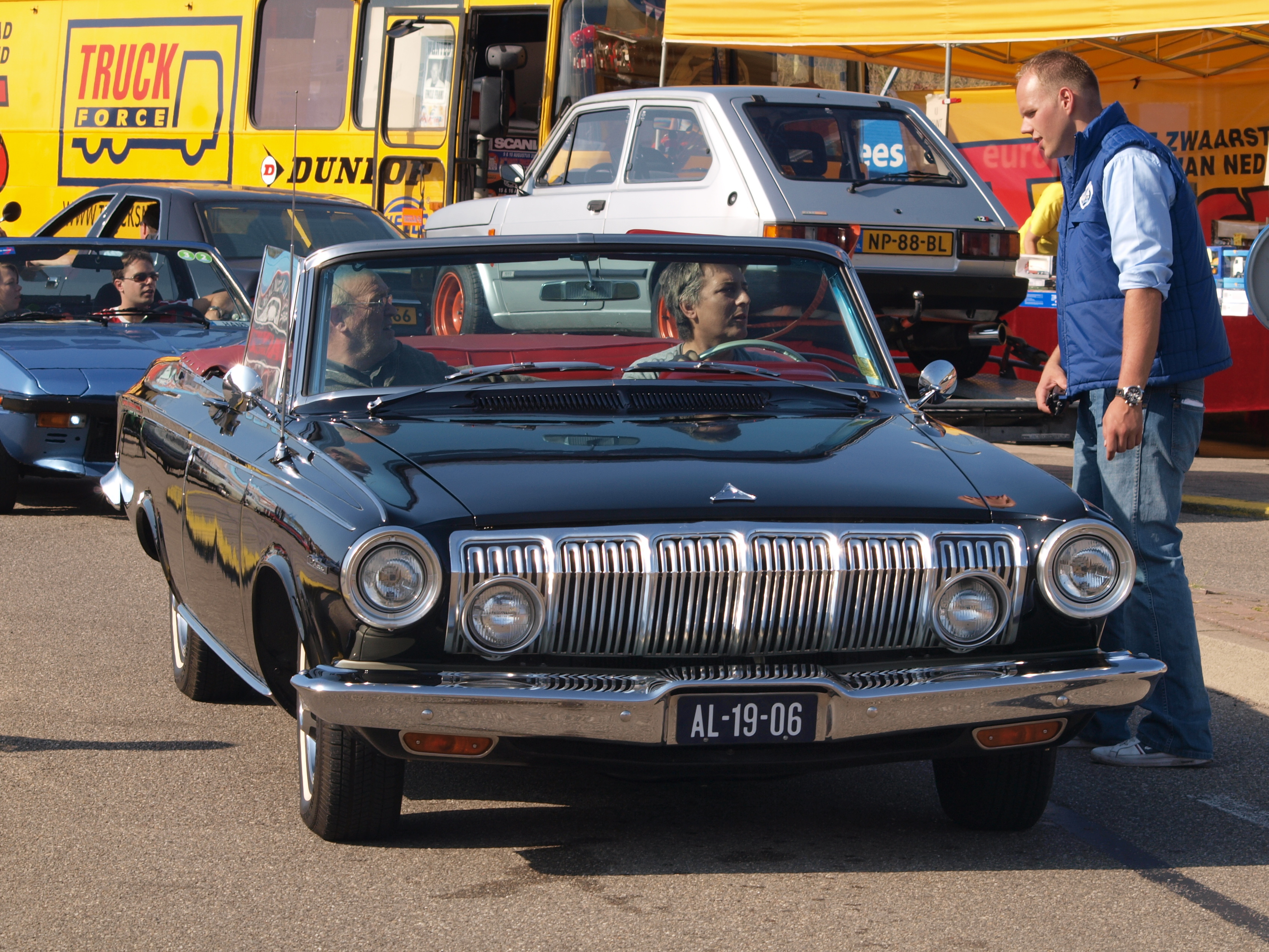
1963 Polara convertible

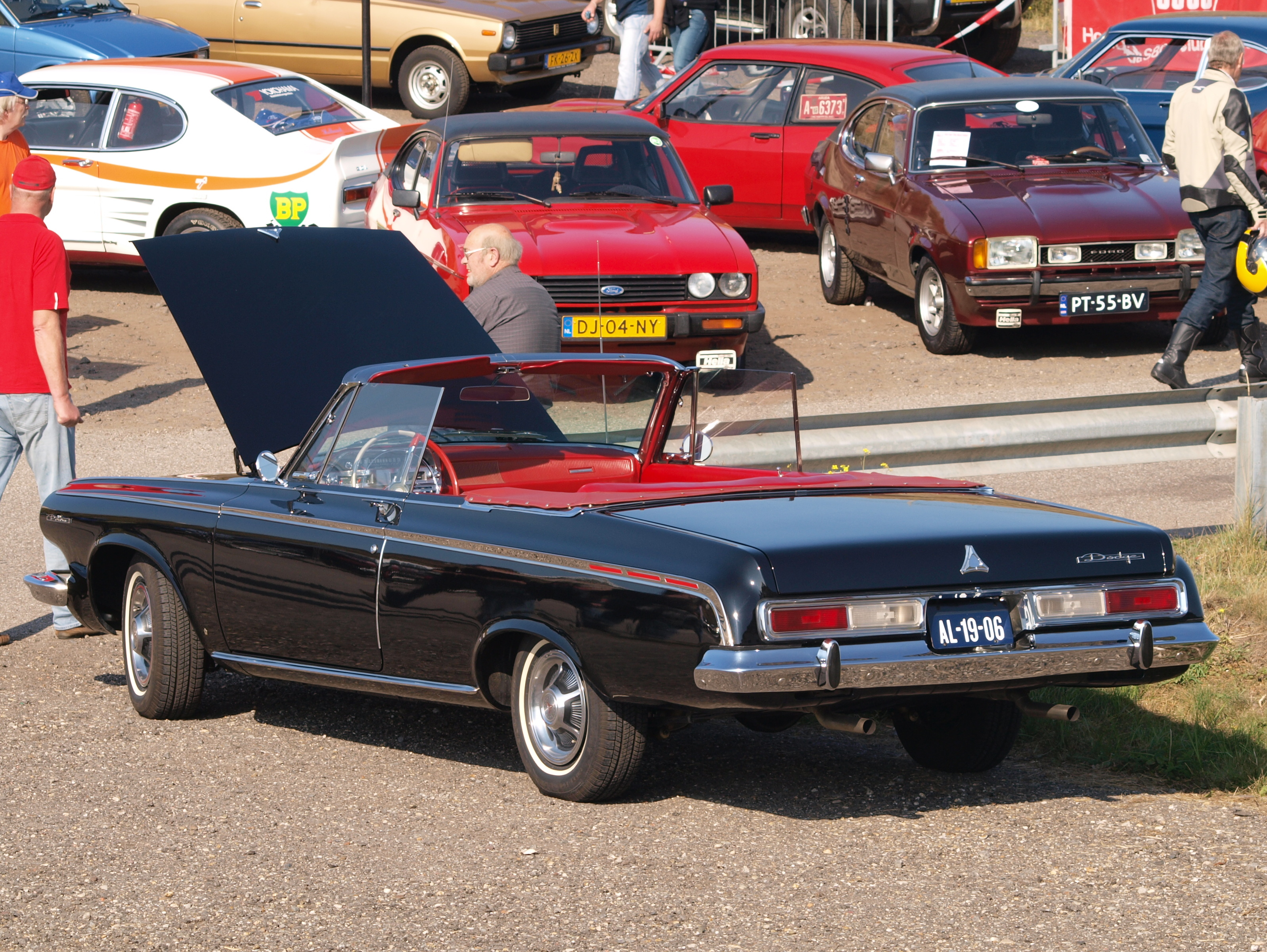
1963 Polara convertible

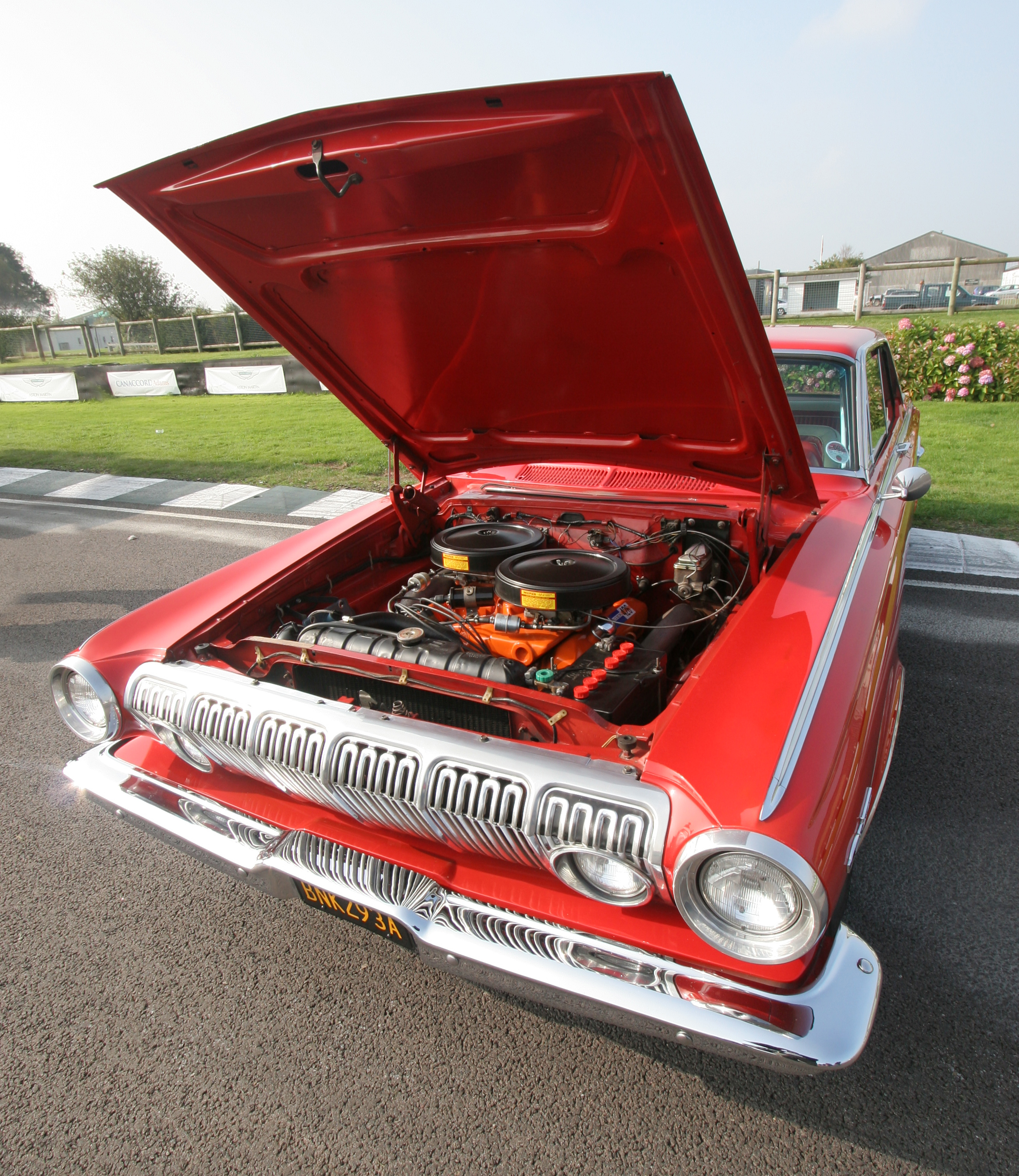
1963 Dodge Polara with Max Wedge engine option

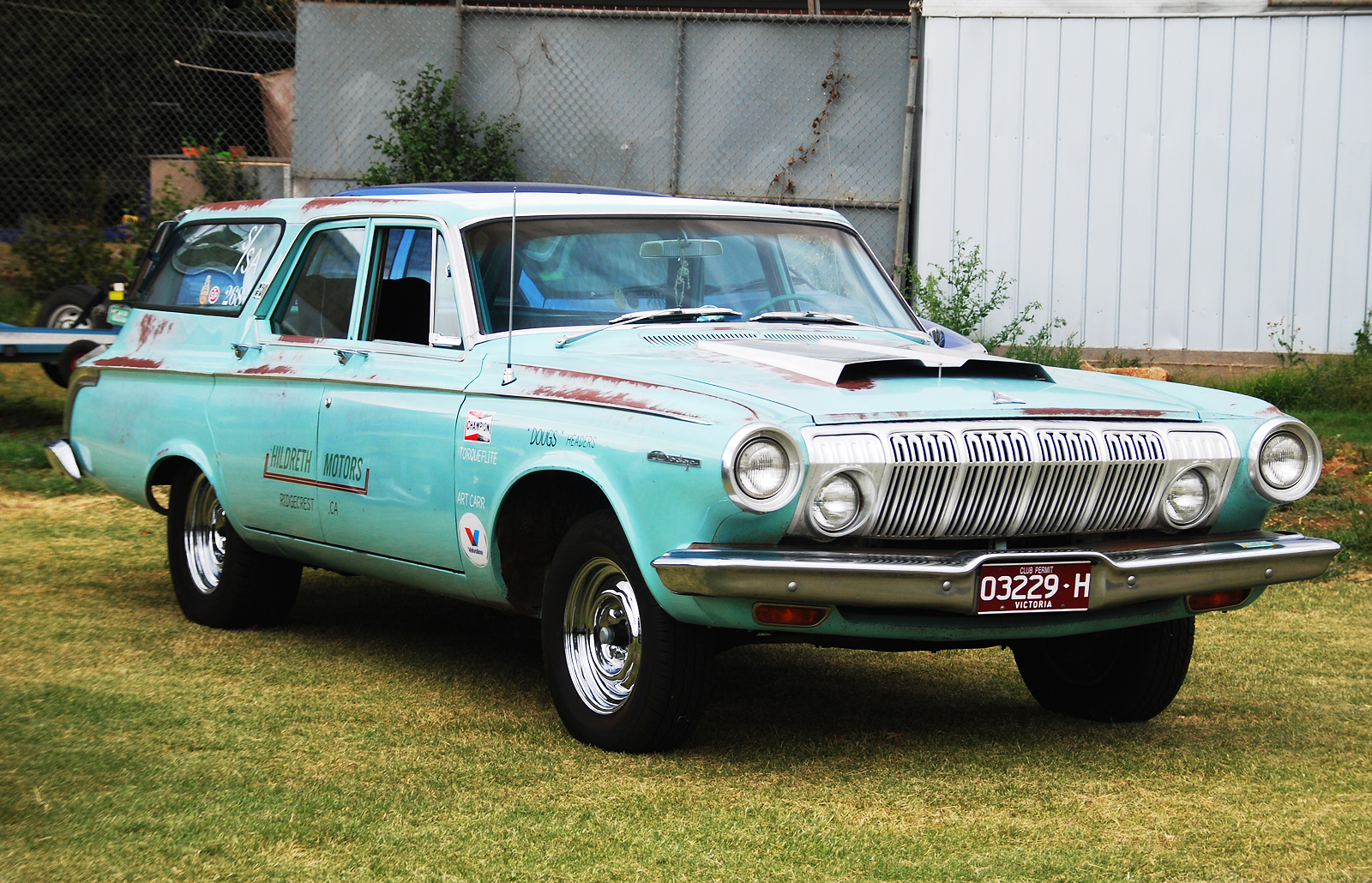
1963 Dodge Polara 4-door wagon

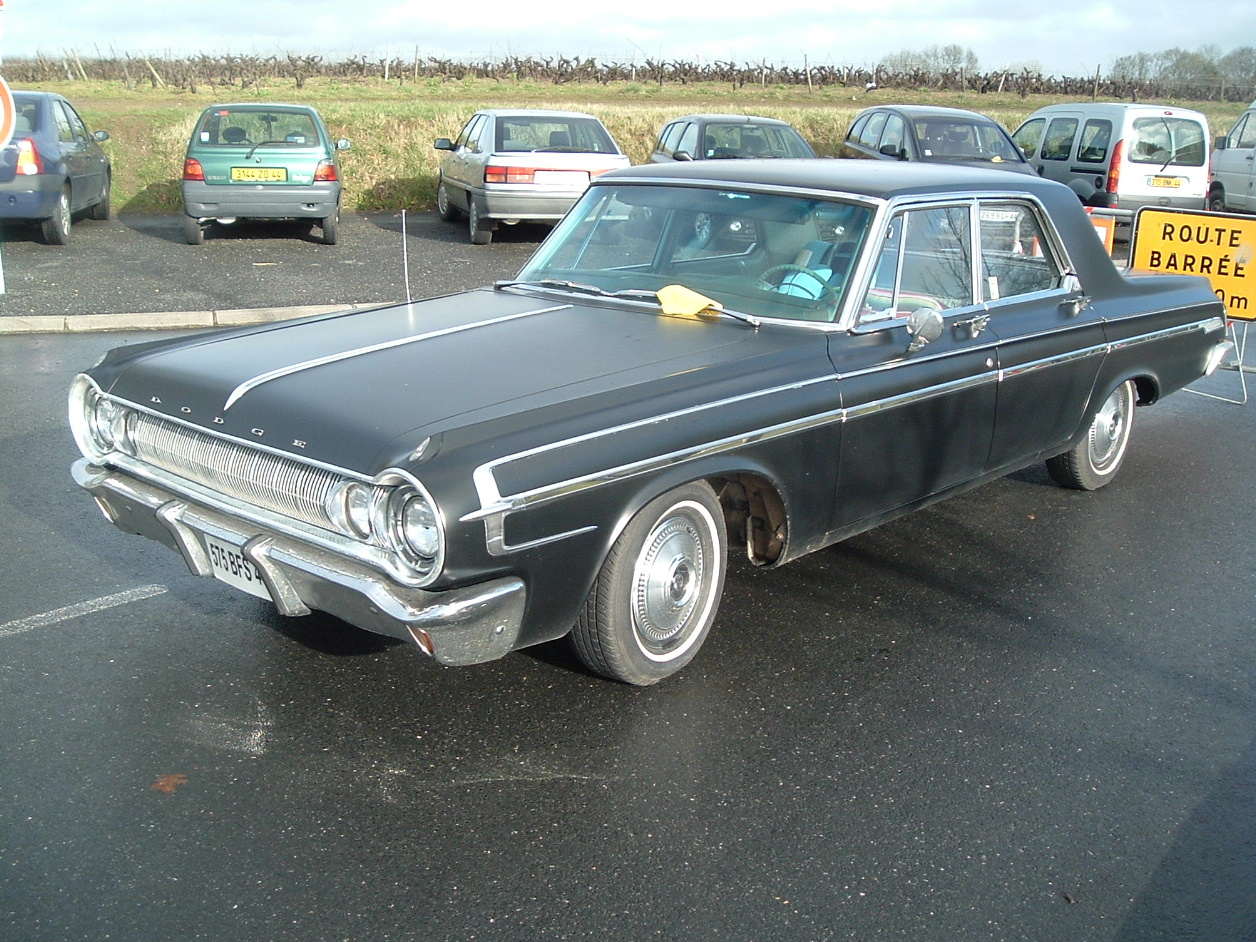
1964 Dodge Polara 4-door sedan

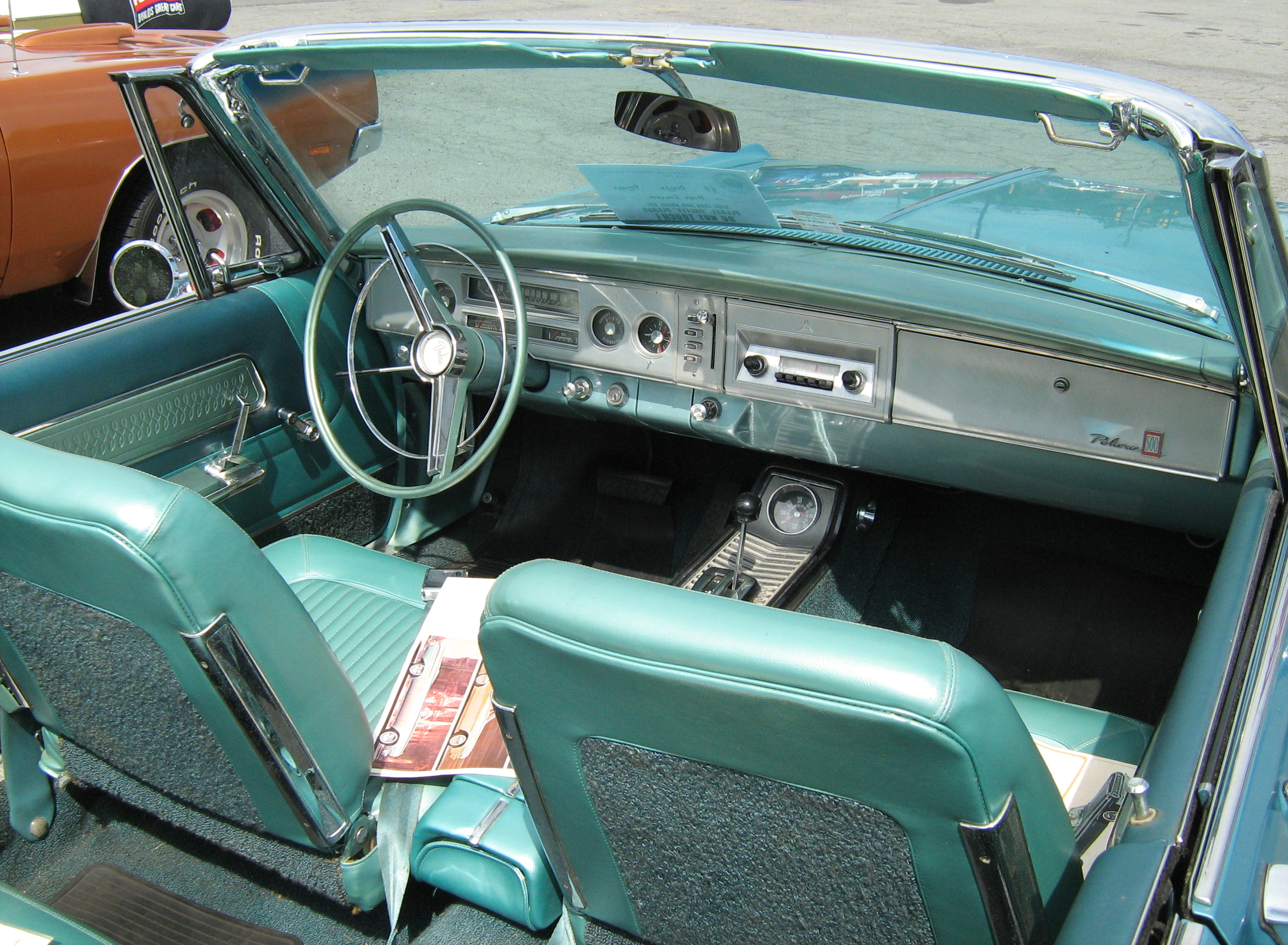
1964 Dodge Polara 500 convertible

== 1965–1968 ==
Third generation
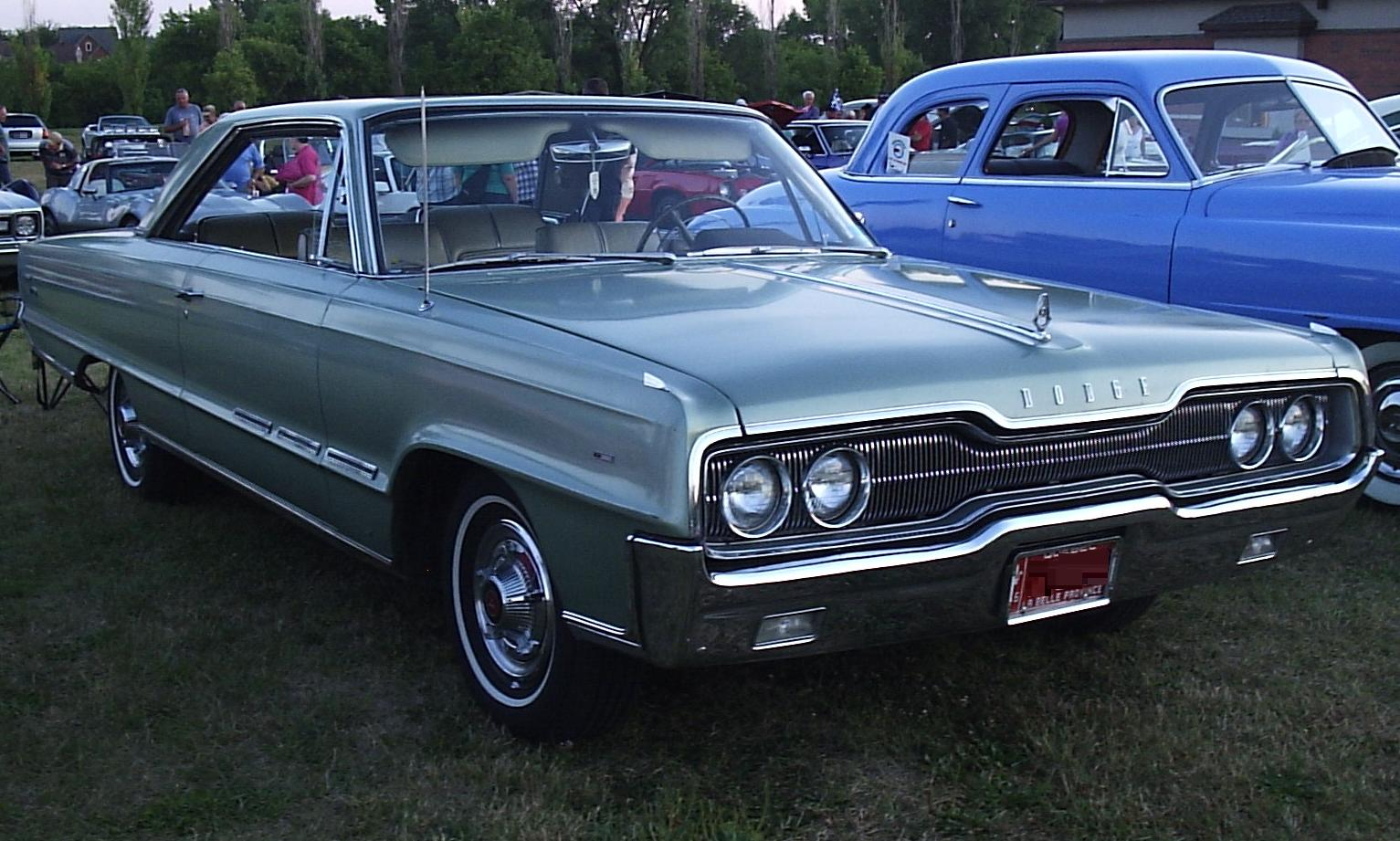
- 1966 Dodge Polara 2-door hardtop

Overview
- Model years: 1965–1968
- Assembly: United States: Hamtramck, Michigan (Dodge Main Factory); United States: Belvidere, Illinois (Belvidere Assembly Plant)

Body and chassis
- Body style: 4-door sedan 2-door coupe 2-door convertible 4-door station wagon
- Platform: C-body

Powertrain
- Engine: 318 cu in (5.2 L) V8 (1965–1968); 383 cu in (6.3 L) V8 (1965–1968); 413 cu in (6.8 L) V8 (1965); 426 cu in (7.0 L) V8 (1965) 440 cu in (7.2 L) V8 (1966–1968)
- Transmission: 3-speed automatic 3-speed manual 4-speed manual

Dimensions
- Wheelbase: 121.0 in (3,073 mm) 1965–1966; 122.0 in (3,099 mm) 1967–1968
- Length: 213.3 in (5,418 mm) 1965–1966; 219.6 in (5,578 mm) 1967–1968 (except wagons)
- Width: 80.0 in (2,032 mm)
- Height: 62.0 in (1,575 mm)

For the 1965 model year, Chrysler moved the Polara back to the full-sized Chrysler C platform shared with Chrysler and Plymouth models. Once again offered in a full range of bodies (sedans, hardtops, station wagons, etc.), the Polara, in effect, replaced the 880 and remained a step below the Custom 880, and the new Monaco hardtop coupe was now Dodge's top model. The previous mid-sized Dodges that were sold under the names Polara 500, Polara, 440, and 330 continued in production under the name Dodge Coronet, their wheelbase shrinking to 117 inches (2,972 mm). These Polaras were criticized for low fuel economy, with owners of 383 cu in (6.3 L) cars achieving an average of 13.8 mpg_{‑US} (17.0 L/100 km; 16.6 mpg_{‑imp}).

In the 1966 model year, the Monaco would replace the Custom 880 as the mid-level model, while a new Monaco 500 would replace the previous 1965 Monaco. The 1967 models received a facelift, and the hardtop coupe adopted a semi-fastback roof style with a reverse-slant rear quarter window. The 1967 models included a new U.S. government-required safety package that featured an energy-absorbing steering column and safety steering wheel, blunt dashboard controls, more interior padding, and a dual-circuit brake master cylinder. The 1968 model year added outboard front shoulder belts and side marker lights, in addition to the 1967 safety equipment.

One constant of the 1965 through 1968 models was square-edged styling that was updated each model year. From 1965 until 1970, the Polara would be the only full-sized Dodge available in the U.S. as a convertible.

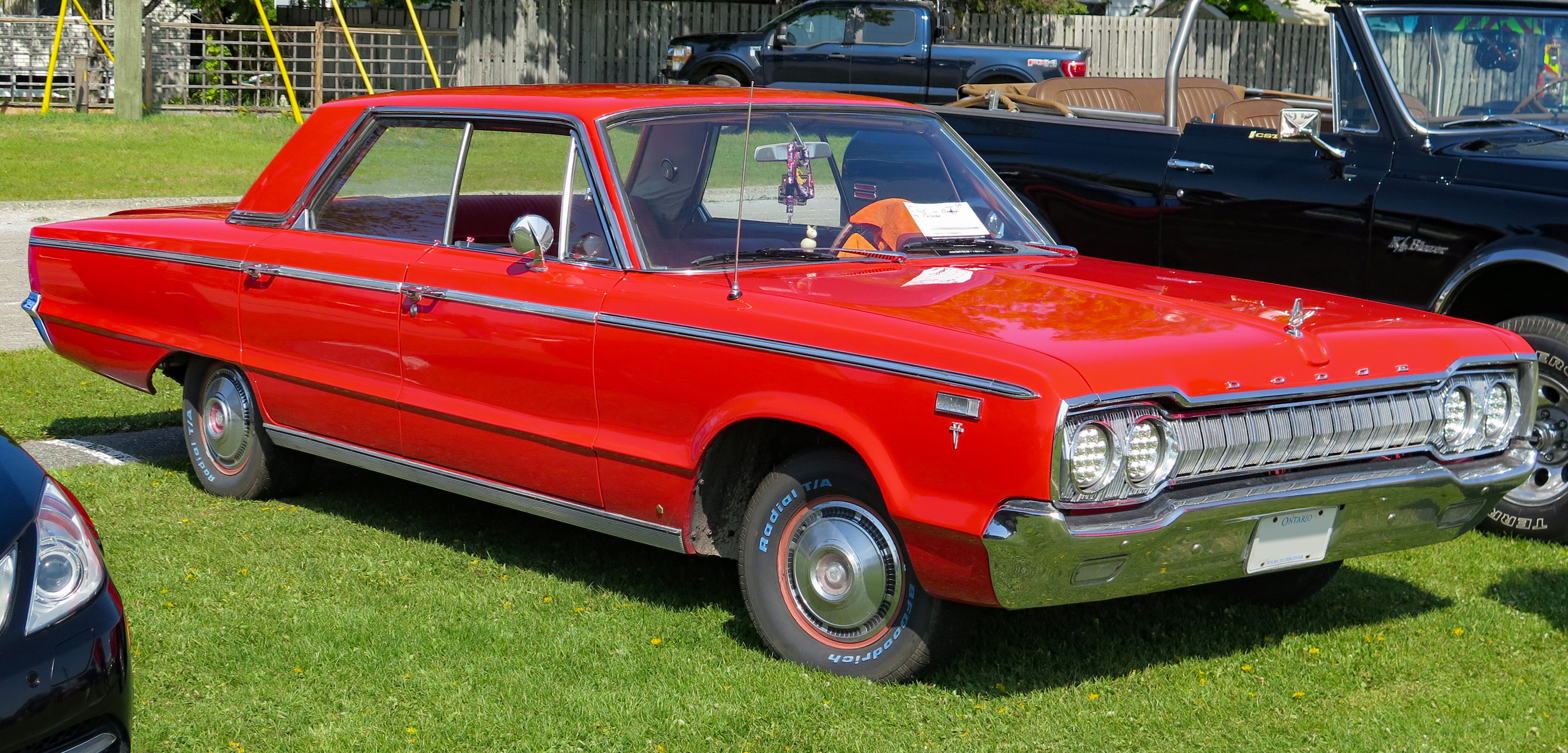
1965 Dodge Polara 880 4-door hardtop

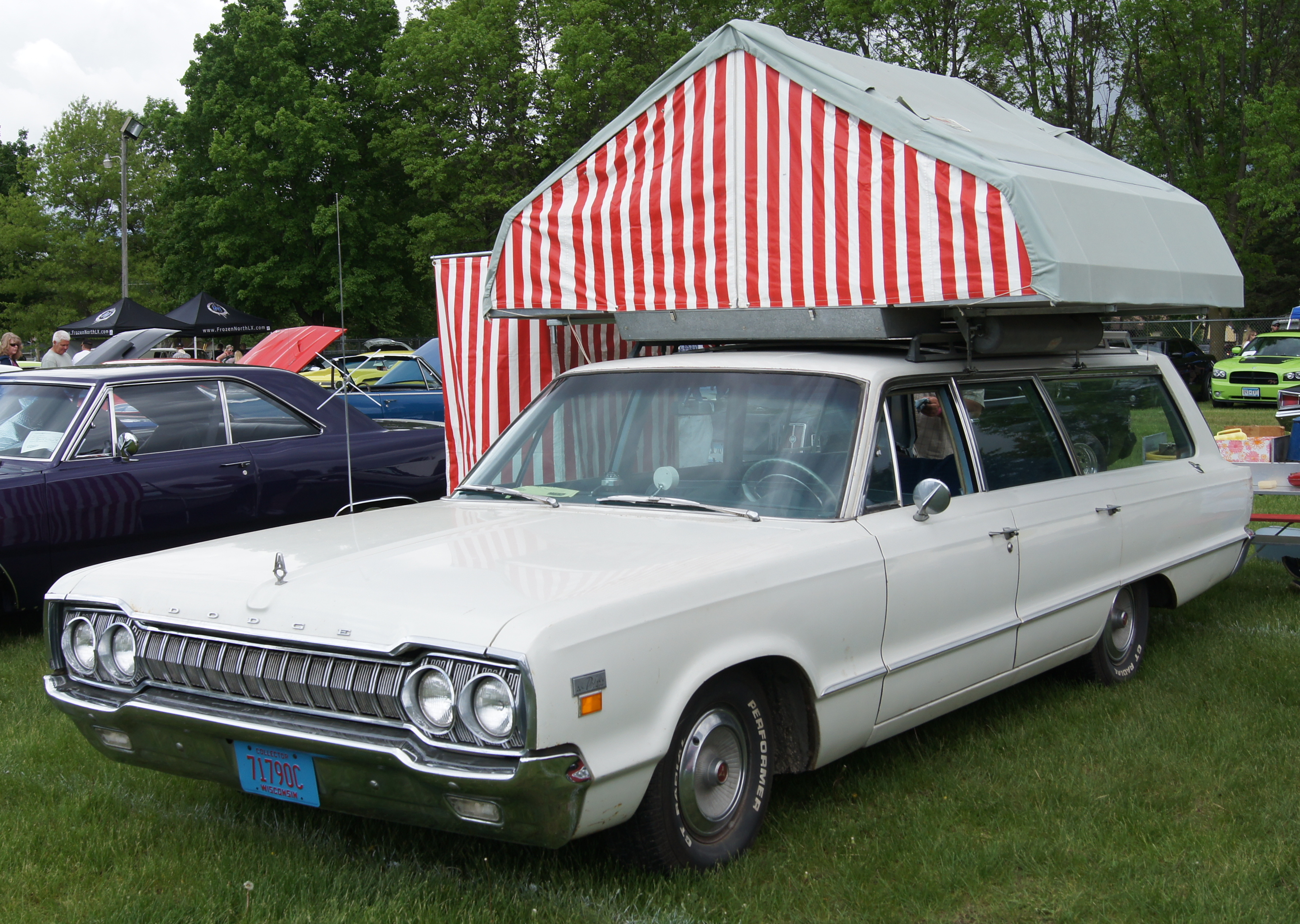
1965 Dodge Polara station wagon

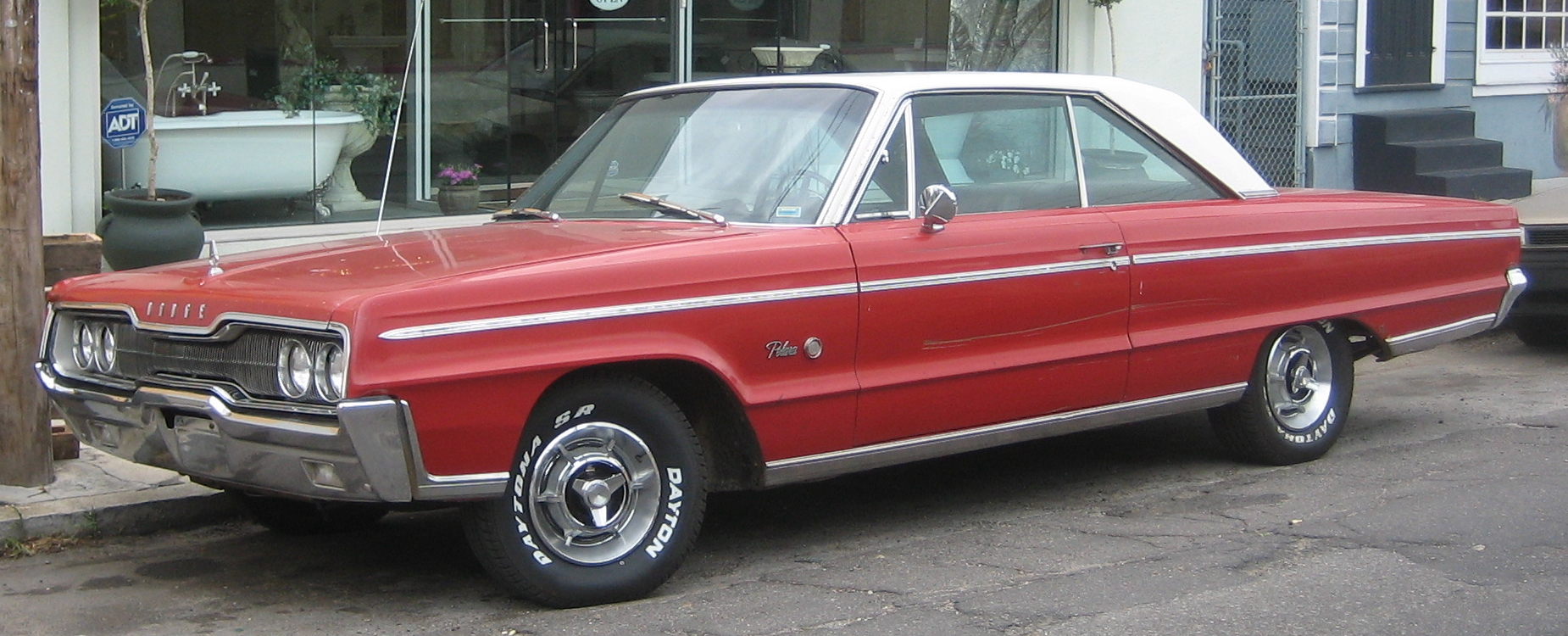
1966 Dodge Polara 500 2-door hardtop (with non-standard lettered tires)

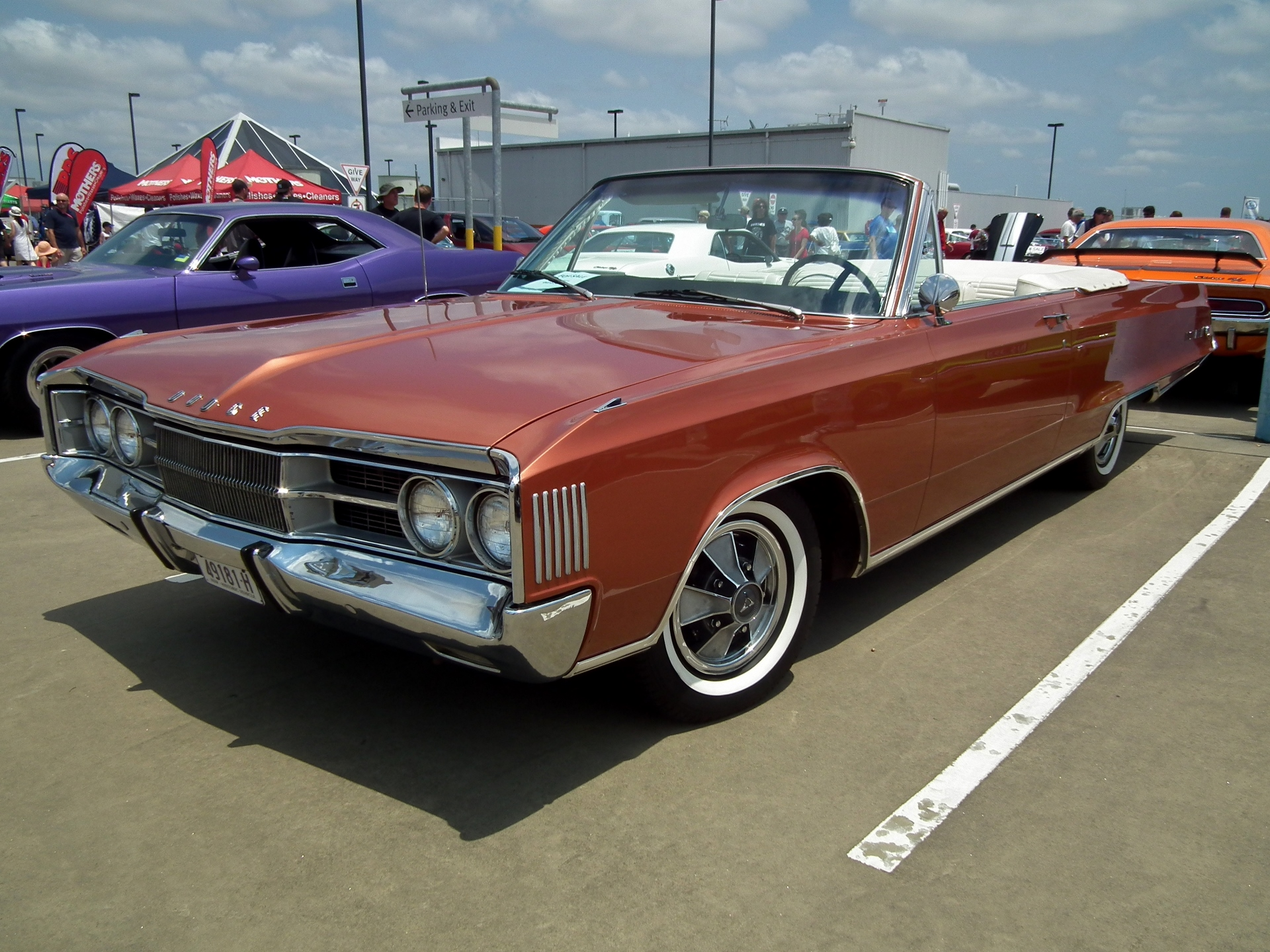
1967 Dodge Polara convertible

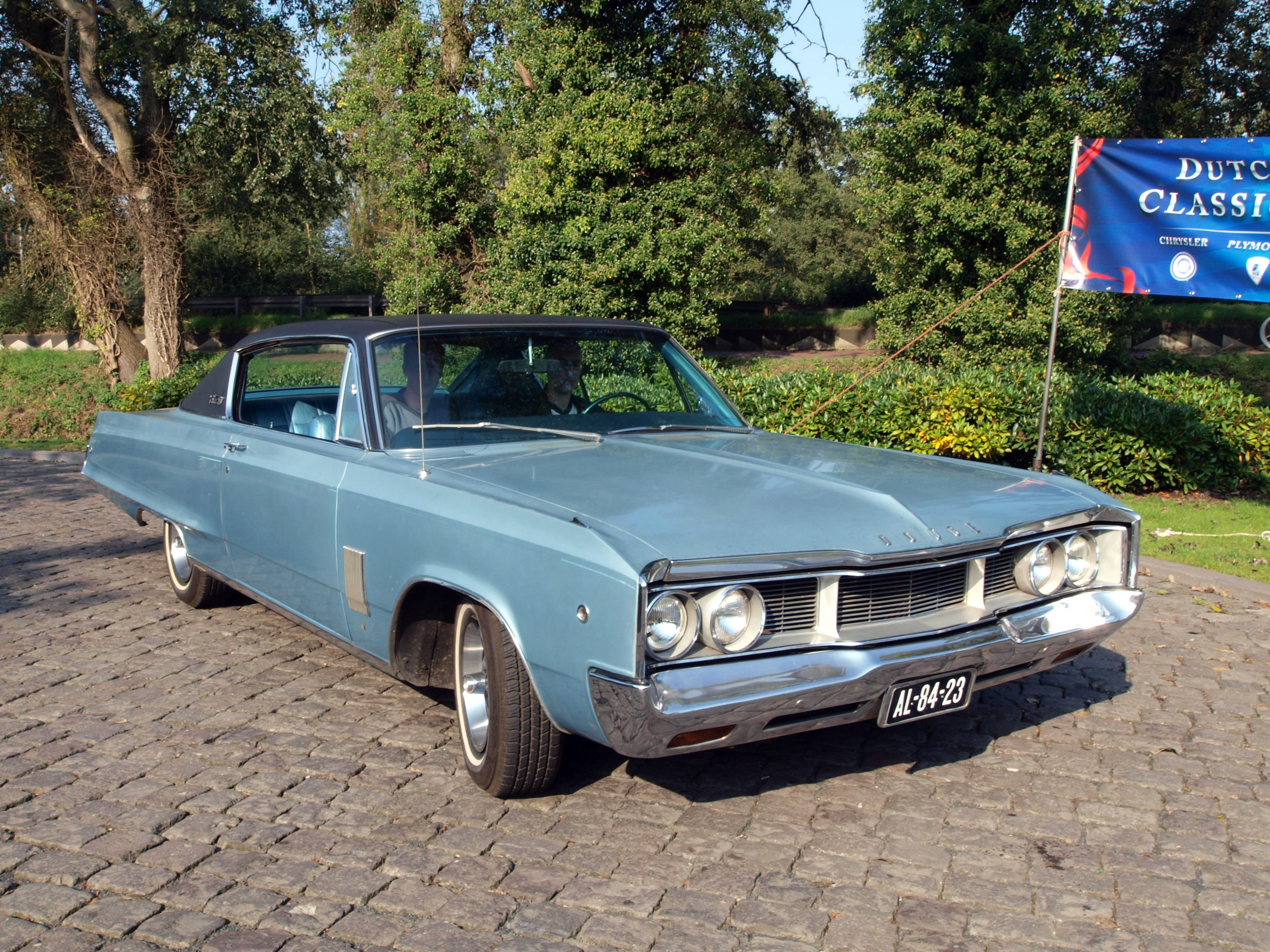
1968 Polara coupe

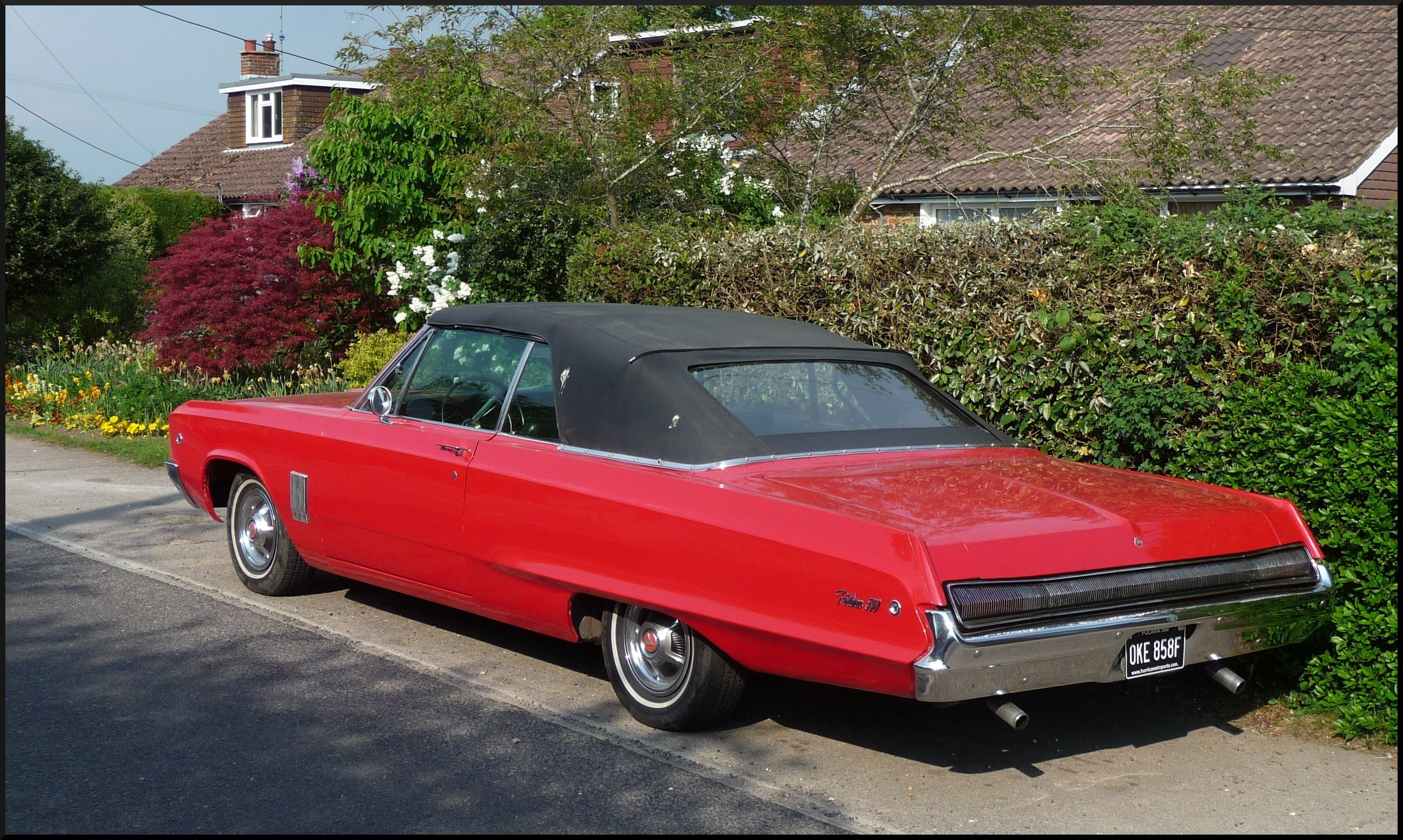
1968 Polara convertible

== 1969–1973 ==
Fourth generation
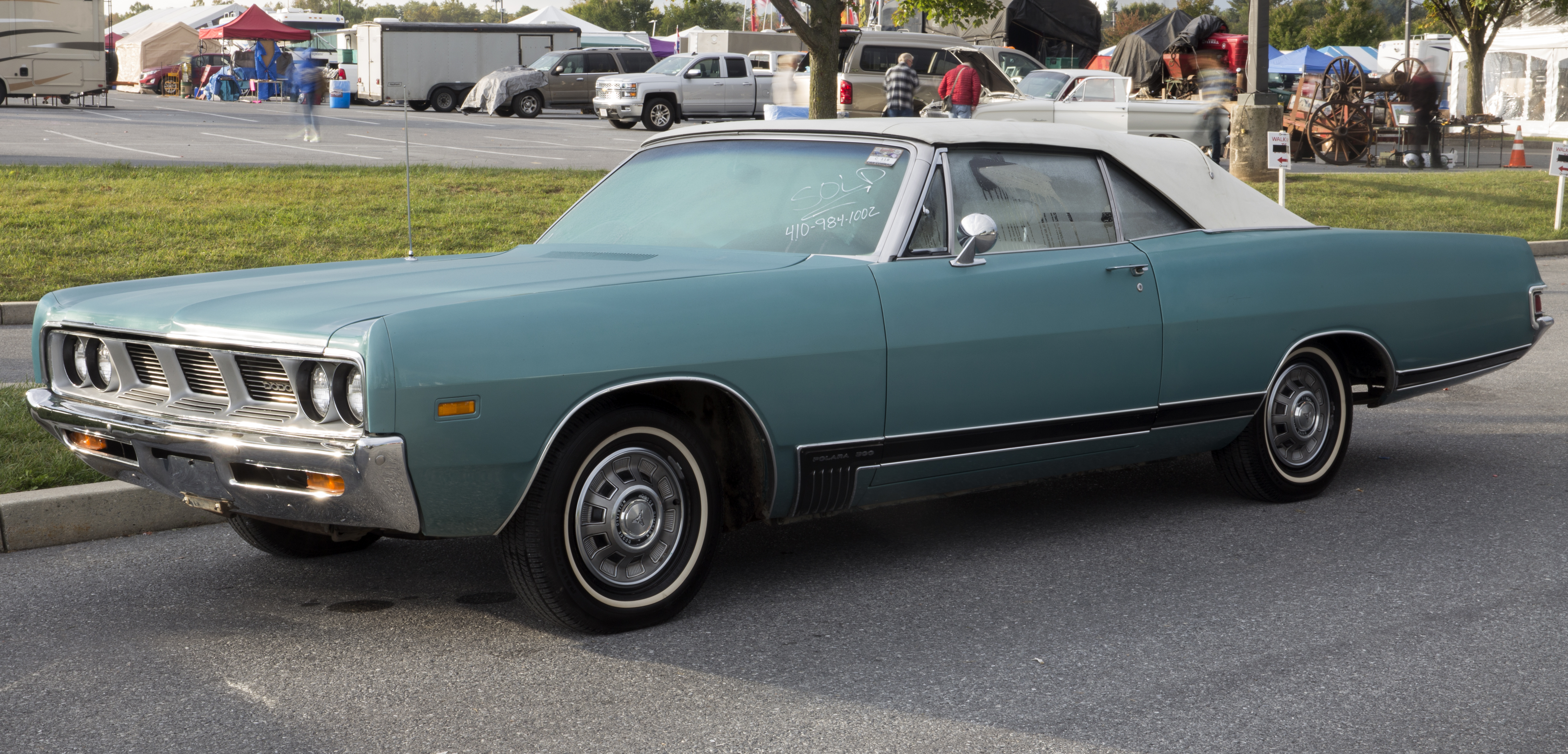
- 1969 Polara 500 convertible

Overview
- Model years: 1969–1973
- Assembly: United States: Hamtramck, Michigan (Dodge Main Factory); United States: Belvidere, Illinois (Belvidere Assembly Plant); United States: Newark, Delaware (Newark Assembly)

Body and chassis
- Body style: 4-door sedan 2-door coupe 2-door convertible 4-door station wagon
- Platform: C-body

Powertrain
- Engine: 225 cu in (3.7 L) I6; 318 cu in (5.2 L) V8; 360 cu in (5.9 L) V8; 383 cu in (6.3 L) V8; 400 cu in (6.6 L) V8; 440 cu in (7.2 L) V8
- Transmission: 3-speed automatic 3-speed manual

Dimensions
- Wheelbase: 122.0 in (3,099 mm)
- Length: 1969–1970: 220.8 in (5,608 mm); 1971–73: 220.0 in (5,588 mm)
- Width: 1969–1970: 79.3 in (2,014 mm); 1971–73: 79.0 in (2,007 mm)
- Height: 1969–1970: 56.8 in (1,443 mm); 1971–73: 63.4 in (1,610 mm)

The new 1969 Polara wore a broad-shouldered streamlined design, called the "fuselage design", which would continue for five model years. New safety requirements included front seat head restraints.

The Polara 500 model was reintroduced for the 1969 model year and positioned between the standard Polara and the top-of-the-line Monaco. The Polara 500 was available as either a convertible or a hardtop coupe. The standard engine was the 225 cu in (3.7 L) slant-6 with optional 318 cu in (5.2 L), 383 cu in (6.3 L), and 440 cu in (7.2 L) V8s available. The 1969 Dodge Polara models offered a unique "Super-Lite" option, which placed a single quartz auxiliary "turnpike beam" headlamp in the driver-side grille.

The 1969 CHP Polara held the record on the Chrysler test track in Chelsea, Michigan, until 1994 for the highest top speed achieved by a factory-built four-door sedan - 149.6 miles per hour (241 km/h) until a 1994 Chevrolet Caprice broke the record with an LT1 engine.

In 1970, the Polara received new front and rear styling that included a bumper that wrapped around the grille and headlights. The Polara Custom replaced the Polara 500 in hardtop coupe, four-door hardtop sedan, and conventional four-door sedan body styles. There was also a stripped-down Polara Special available as either a four-door sedan or station wagon. The 1970 model was the last that the Polara would be available in a convertible body style (with a scant 842 produced, making it extremely rare today) and Dodge would never again offer a full-sized convertible. The early 1970 production featured a "medallion" rear bumper. This bumper was pictured in all of the sales literature, but was discontinued after late August or early September 1969 production and replaced with a plain bumper lacking the center Fratzog medallion. Dodge also discontinued the Super-Lite option at the end of the 1970 model year because of a lack of consumer interest and challenges to its legality in some states. The 1970s also received a new locking steering column which locked the steering wheel and column shift lever when the ignition key was removed.

The Polara Special was discontinued for the 1971 model year with a new sub-series, the Polara Brougham, positioned above the Polara Custom, but below the Monaco. The Polara Brougham was available only as a hardtop coupe or a four-door hardtop sedan. The 360 cu in (5.9 L) V8 was also introduced for 1971.

The 1972 model year featured a facelift with new sheet metal and the discontinuation of the Polara Brougham model. The 1973 models received new front-end styling (reminiscent of the full-size 1970 Chevrolets) abandoning the wraparound front bumper.

Sales of the Polara were declining. Having been eclipsed by the Monaco, Dodge discontinued the Polara after 1973. The energy crisis in the fall of 1973, spurred on by the Arab/OPEC oil embargo, resulted in a drop in sales of all full-size American automobiles that did not provide good fuel economy. The redesigned 1974 Monaco replaced the Polara.

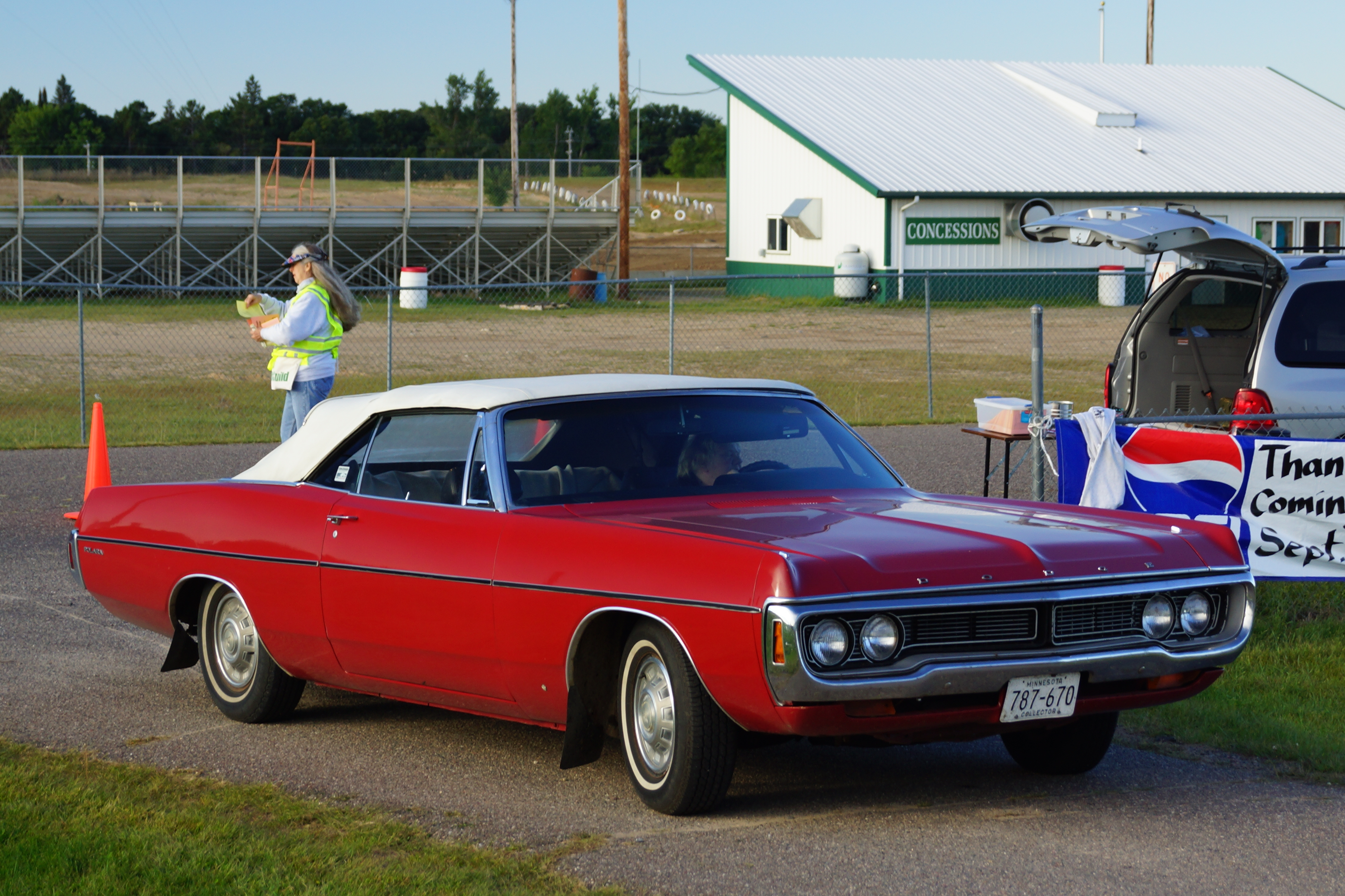
1970 Polara convertible

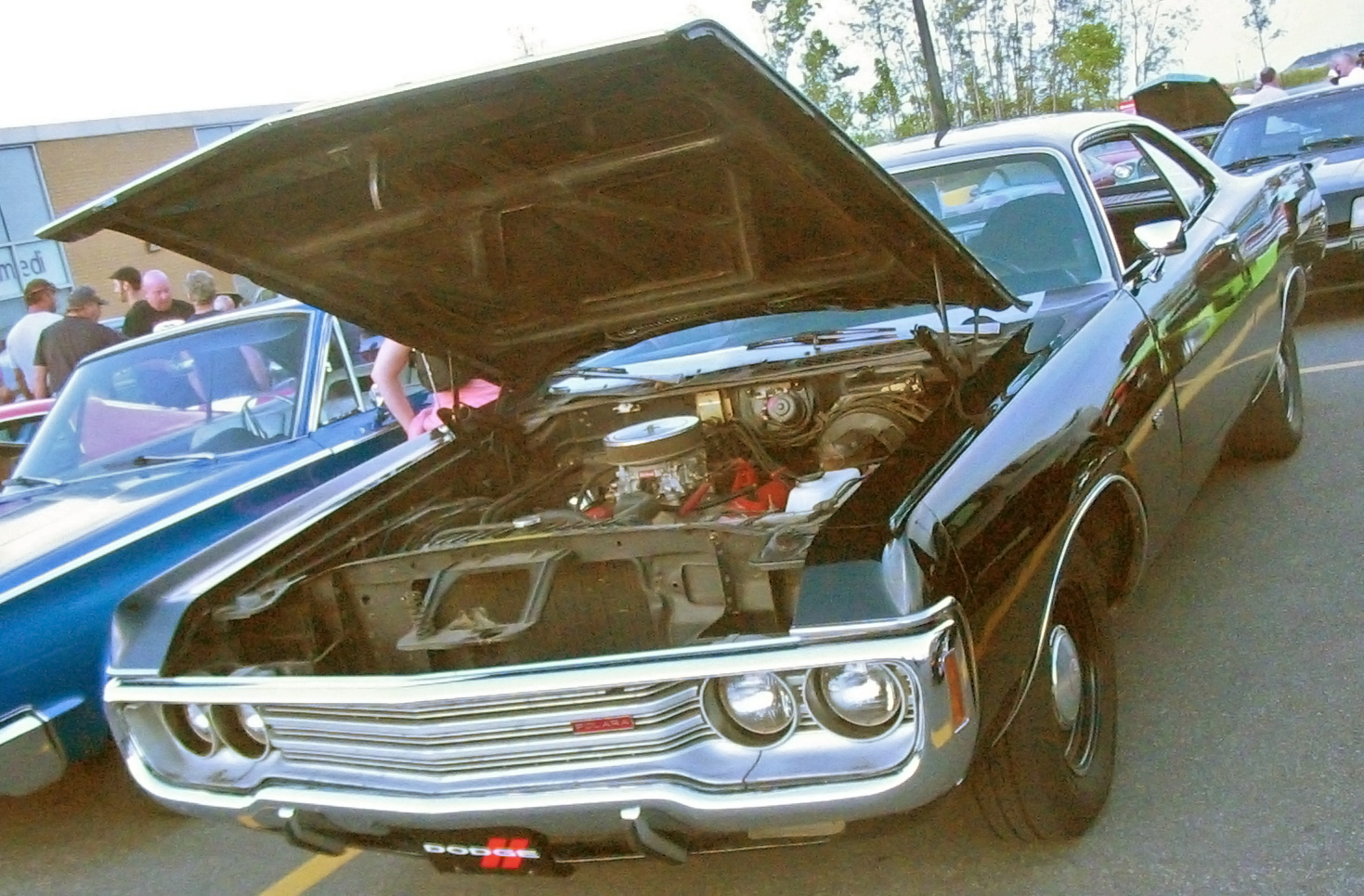
1971 Polara 2-door hardtop

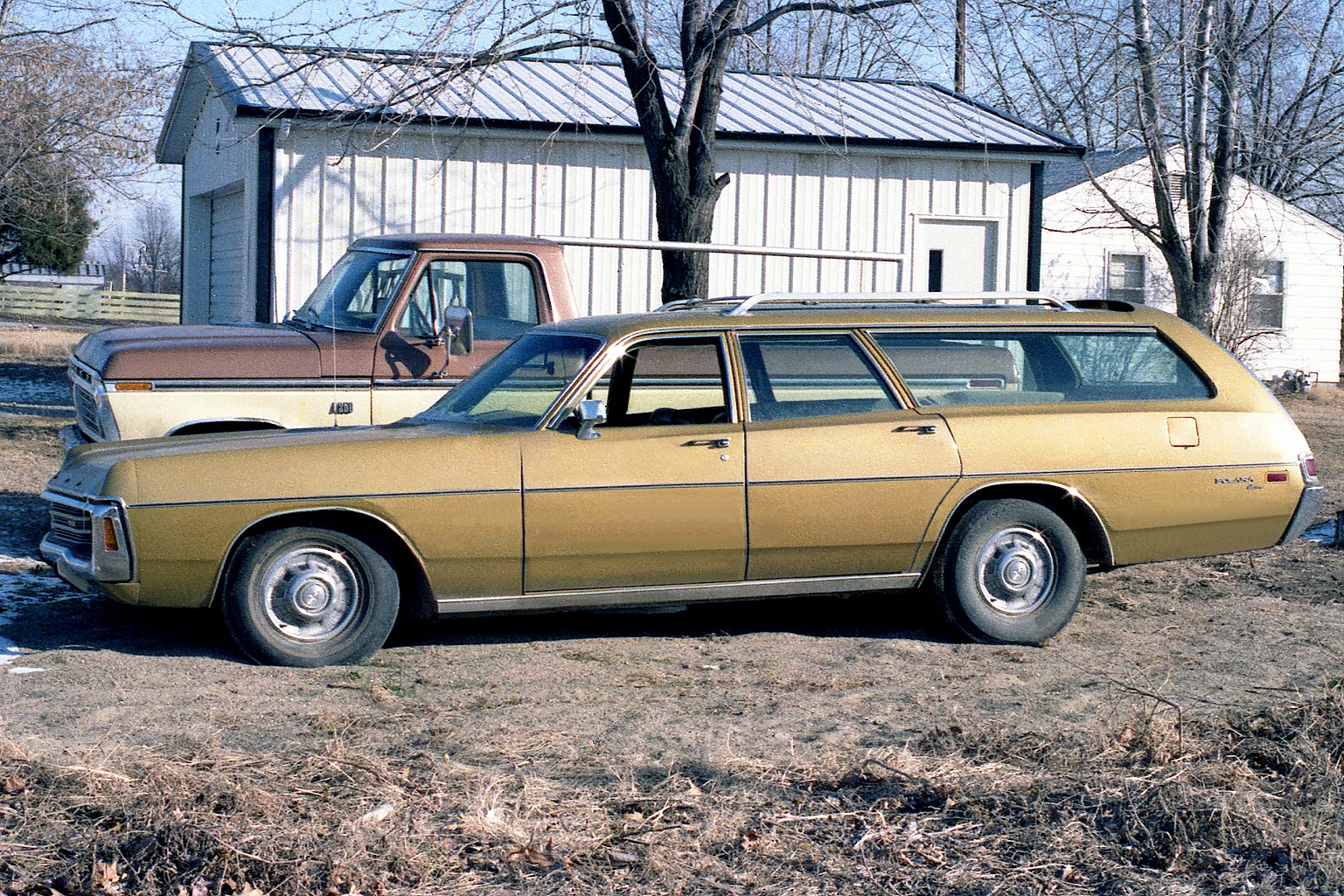
1971 Polara Custom station wagon

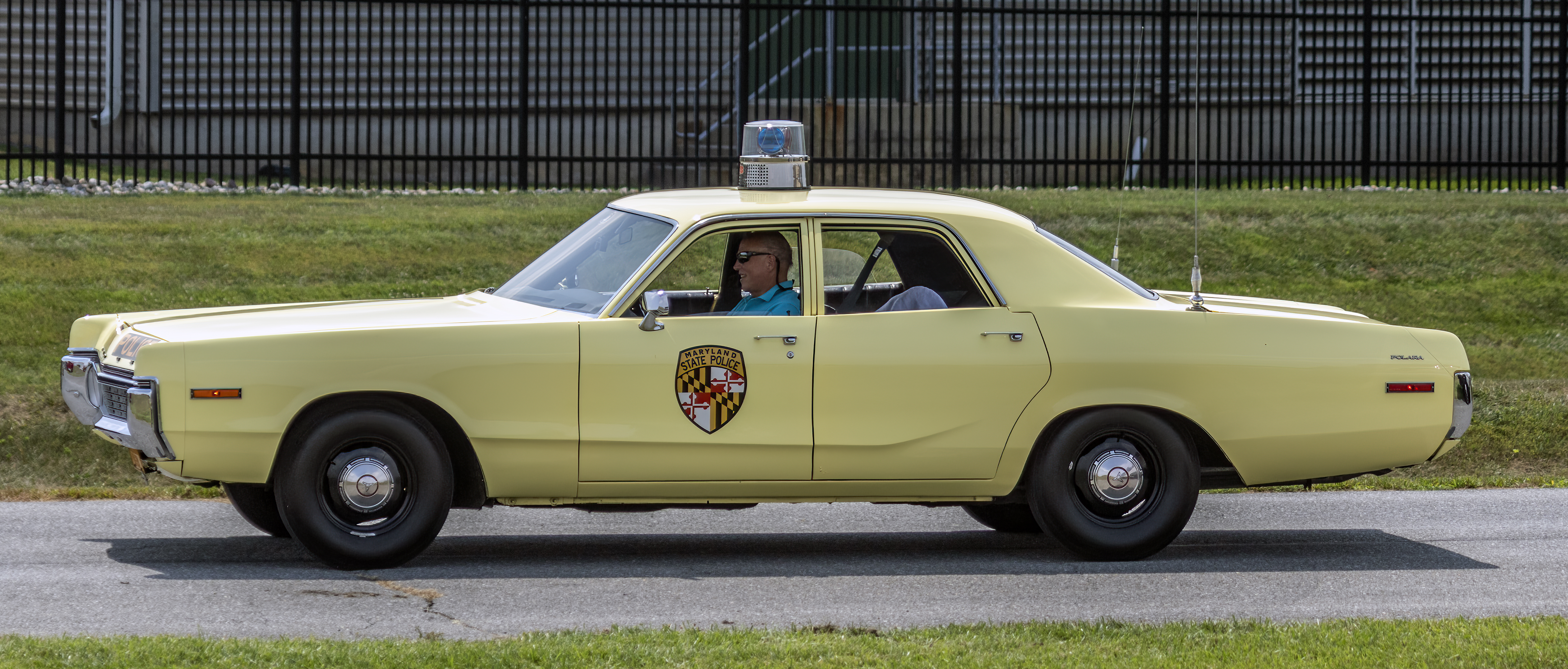
1972 Dodge Polara 4-door sedan police car

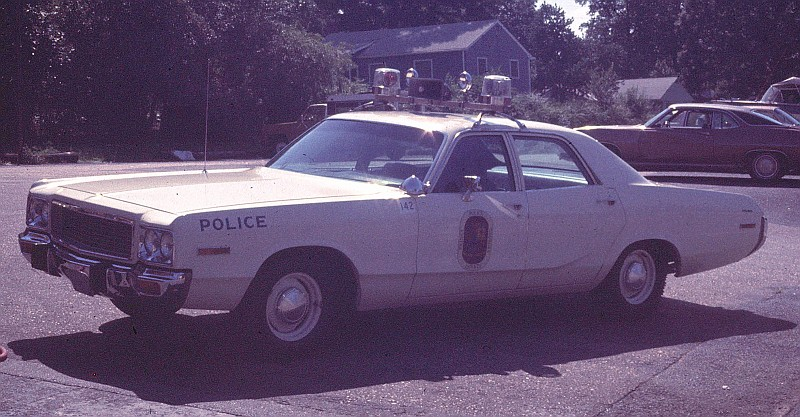
1973 Dodge Polara 4-door sedan police car

== In Argentina ==
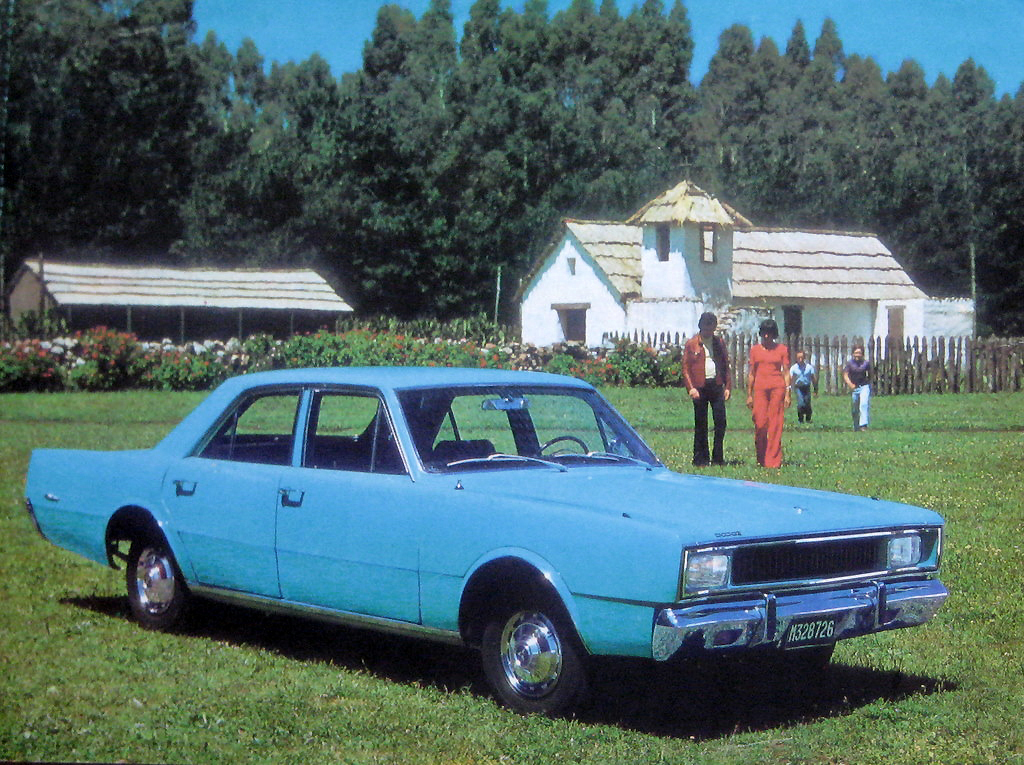
A Dodge Polara designed and made in Argentina

In Argentina, the name Polara was used to refer to a series of vehicles developed on the basis of the North American 1967-1969 Dodge Dart. These cars were manufactured between 1968 and 1980 by the subsidiary Chrysler Fevre Argentina in sedan and coupe versions.

While the Argentinian Polara was badged as a Dodge, it was marketed alongside the Argentinian variant of the Plymouth Valiant (derived from the US Plymouth Valiant, the first and second-generation Australian Chrysler Valiant, and third and fourth generation US Dodge Dart). The sedan variant of this line was mainly composed of two models based on the same body, with the basic model sold as the Polara and the deluxe version as the Coronado. The coupe variant's models were also based on the same body, with the basic model known as the Dodge Polara coupe, the sports version as the Dodge Polara R/T, all these models featured the 225 cu in (3.7 L) slant-six engine, and the deluxe high-performance version was the Dodge GTX. This last model came equipped with a 318 cu in (5.2 L) V8, considered the most powerful engine ever produced in Argentina. Other models in the production line were the Dodge Valiant, Polara GT, and the Polara diesel, all four-door sedans.

The Dodge Polara line of cars was designed exclusively for the Argentinian market. The interior, especially the dashboard, is similar to that of the early 1970s Dodge Dart–Plymouth Valiant cars. The coupes were not available in large numbers, but are collected by enthusiasts. They were hard to sell as gas consumption is high compared to the 4- and 6-cylinder cars the Argentinian consumer is used to. Several restyling jobs of the whole line with new front and rear ends were carried out within its lifetime.

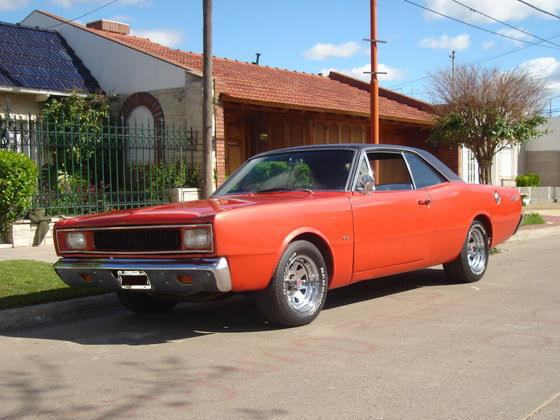
A Dodge Polara GTX coupé in Argentina with the hardtop option and premium orange paint

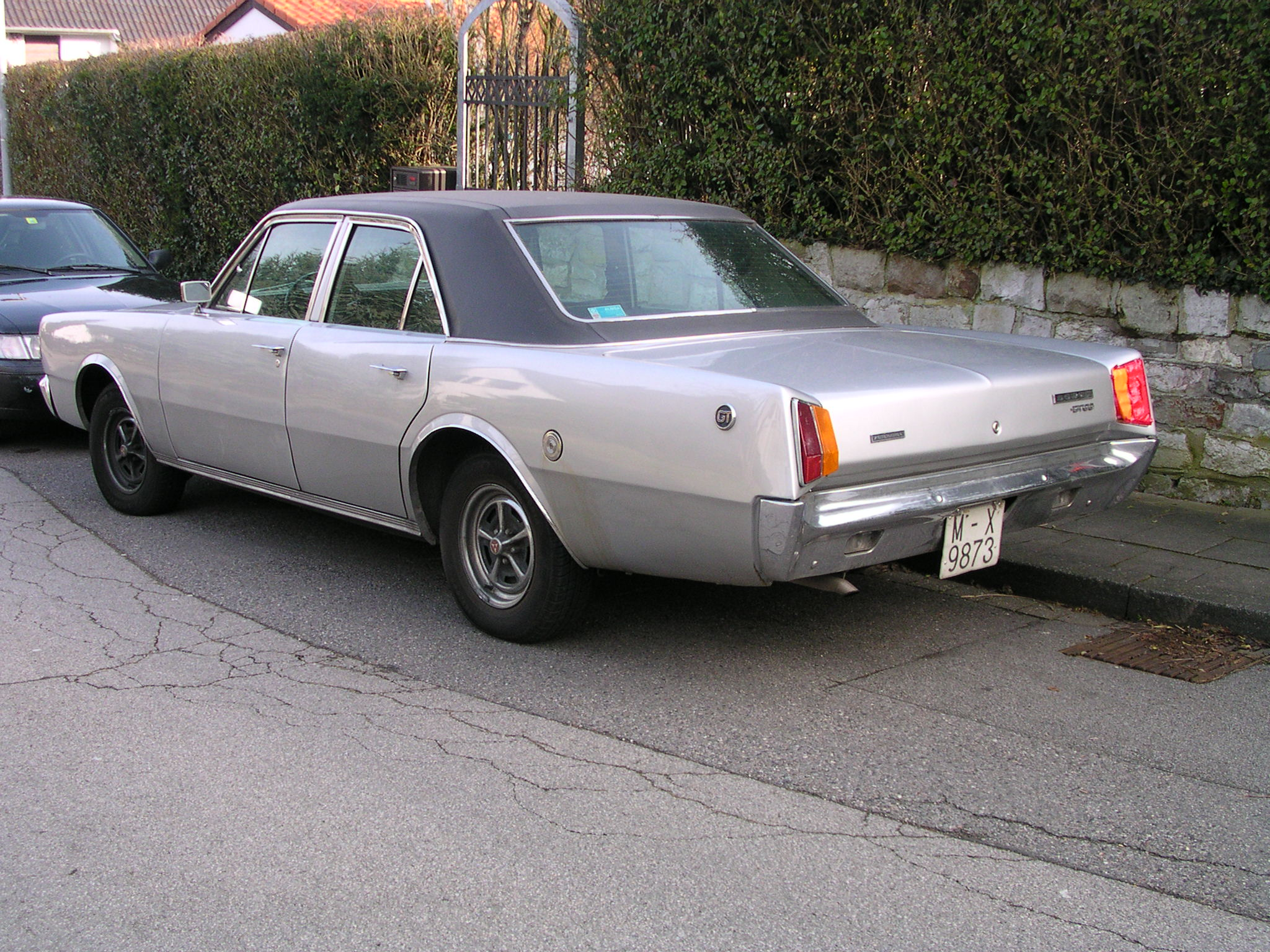
Spanish-market 3700 GT version

An automobile magazine, Corsa, road-tested a Polara GTX coupé with a V8 rated at 212 hp (158 kW) at 4,400 rpm, 308 lb⋅ft (418 N⋅m) at 2,600 rpm and 8.5:1 compression ratio. It reached a top speed of 189 km/h (117 mph), and reached 0–100 km/h (0–62 mph) in 10.2 seconds.

There was also a version of this model, built from 1971 to 1978 exported to Spain as a CKD in cooperation with the Barreiros company known as the Dodge 3700.

Dodge Polara GTX→ Technical data (in Spanish)

== In Brazil ==
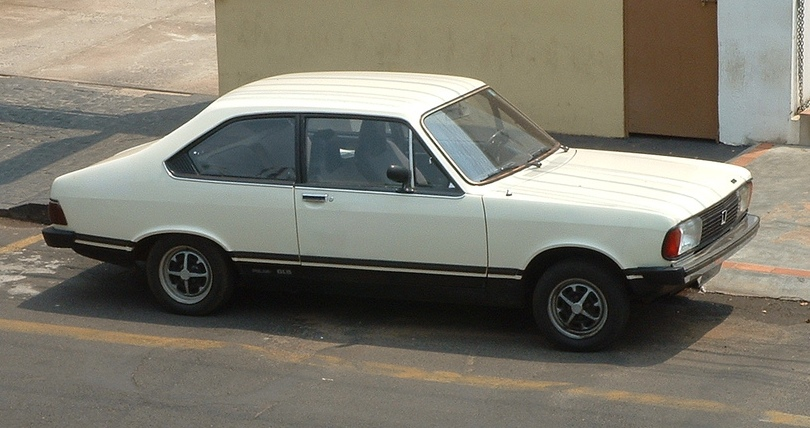
Brazilian Dodge Polara GLS

In Brazil, the Polara nameplate was revived in 1977 for a version of the Chrysler Avenger, and sold until 1981.

There was also a version of this model in sedan and station wagon built in the 1970s in Argentina of the same car known as the Dodge 1500 until Volkswagen took over Chrysler Fevre Argentina SAIC, including the tooling for the car, in 1980. From then until 1988, the car was sold in Argentina as the Volkswagen 1500 (not to be confused with the Type 3, also sold as the Volkswagen 1500 in most markets, including a similar version with 1600 engine in Brazil).

== In Canada ==
Chrysler of Canada marketed the Polara as its full-size model starting with the 1964 model year, and all Canadian Polaras were based on the U.S. full-size Dodge platforms. For 1964, the Polara was the top-of-the-line big Dodge. The Polara 880 and Polara 440 models were included in 1965 and 1966, with 1966 adding a new base series called, Polara. From 1967 through 1969, the Polara line included a deluxe Polara 500 and a base Polara. (Starting in 1965, Dodge of Canada also offered the top-of-the-line Monaco, similar to the U.S. market Monaco). Starting in 1970, model names were the same as their U.S. counterparts.
