= R/T =

Performance marker used on Dodge automobiles

- Product type: Performance cars
- Current owner: Stellantis North America
- Country: United States
- Introduced: 1960s
- Related brands: SS

R/T is the performance marker used on Dodge/Chrysler automobiles since the 1960s (similar to Chevrolet's Super Sport; or SS). R/T stands for Road/Track. R/T models usually come with R/T badging and a combination of upgraded suspension, tires, brakes, and often more powerful engines. Many models have also come with monotone paint and stripes as well as aggressive body kits.

In 2004, the Chrysler SRT (Street and Racing Technology) division replaced R/T as the high performance auto group for Dodge vehicles, though the trim level is still in use on many current models with more powerful engines and cosmetic changes such as different rims and bumpers and grills and the R/T badge.

== Current vehicles ==
| Years | Vehicle | Type | Engine | Power | 0–60 mph (0–100 km/h) | Photo |
|---|---|---|---|---|---|---|
| 2011–present | Dodge Durango R/T | V8 | 5.7 Chrysler Hemi engine 6.4 Chrysler Hemi engine | 360–475 hp | 7.3 s | |
| 2024–present | Ram Rampage R/T | I4 | 2.0 Fiat Global Medium engine | 268 hp | 6.9 s | Ram Rampage R/T |
| 2024-present | Dodge Charger Daytona R/T | EV | 2× Permanent magnet synchronous motors | 496 hp | 4.7 s | Dodge Charger Daytona R/T |
| 2026-present | Dodge Charger Sixpack R/T | I6 | 3.0 Stellantis Hurricane engine | 420 hp | 4.6 s | |

== Previous vehicles ==
| Years | Vehicle | Type | Engine | 0–60 mph (0–100 km/h) | Photo |
|---|---|---|---|---|---|
| 1991–1992 | Dodge Spirit R/T | I4 | 2.2 Chrysler Turbo III DOHC K engine 224 hp | 5.8 s | |
| 1992–1993 | Dodge Daytona IROC R/T | I4 | 2.2 Chrysler Turbo III DOHC K engine 224 hp | 6.0 s | |
| 1998–1999 | Dodge Neon R/T | I4 | 2.0 Chrysler Neon ECC engine 150 hp | 7.5 s | |
| 2001–2004 | Dodge Neon R/T | I4 | 2.0 Chrysler Neon Magnum engine 150 hp | 7.6 s | |
| 2007–2010 | Dodge Caliber R/T | I4 | 2.4 Chrysler World engine 172 hp | 10.1 s | |
| 2022–2026 | Dodge Hornet R/T | I4 PHEV | 1.3 Fiat Global Small engine | 6.1–7.1 s | Ram Hornet R/T |
| 1991–1996 | Dodge Stealth R/T | V6 | 3.0 Mitsubishi DOHC 6G72 engine 222 hp 3.0 Mitsubishi Twin-Turbo DOHC 6G72 engine 300-320 hp | --- 5.3 s | |
| 2000–2002 | Dodge Intrepid R/T | V6 | 3.5 Chrysler SOHC EGG engine 242-244 hp | | |
| 2001–2005 | Dodge Stratus R/T | V6 | 3.0 Mitsubishi SOHC 6G72 engine 200 hp | 7.4 s | |
| 2007–2009 | Dodge Nitro R/T | V6 | 4.0 Chrysler SOHC EGG engine 260 hp | 7.7 s | |
| 2008–2014 | Dodge Avenger R/T | V6 | 3.5 Chrysler SOHC EGF engine 235 hp 3.6 Chrysler Pentastar engine 283 hp | 6.0 s | |
| 2009–2016 | Dodge Journey R/T | V6 | 3.5 Chrysler SOHC EGF engine 235 hp 3.6 Chrysler Pentastar engine 283 hp | 8.0 s 6.2 s | |
| 1967–1970 | Dodge Coronet R/T | V8 | 7.0 Chrysler 426 Hemi engine 425 hp 7.2 Chrysler RB 440 Six Pack 390 hp 7.2 Chrysler RB 440 Magnum 375 hp | 6.1 s 7.0 s | |
| 1968–1971 | Dodge Charger R/T | V8 | 7.0 Chrysler 426 Hemi engine 425 hp 7.2 Chrysler RB 440 Six Pack 390 hp | 5.3 s 7.4 s | |
| 1970–1971 | Dodge Challenger R/T | V8 | 7.0 Chrysler 426 Hemi engine 425 hp 7.2 Chrysler RB 440 Six Pack 390 hp 6.3 Chrysler B 383 Magnum 335 hp | --- 6.2 s | |
| 1976–1979 | Dodge Aspen R/T | V8 | 5.9 Chrysler LA 360 engine 170–195 hp | 9.9 s | |
| 1998–2003 | Dodge Dakota R/T | V8 | 5.9 Chrysler LA Magnum engine 250 hp | 7.0 s | |
| 2000–2003 | Dodge Durango R/T | V8 | 5.9 Chrysler LA Magnum engine 250 hp | 8.2 s | |
| 2005–2008 | Dodge Magnum R/T | V8 | 5.7 Chrysler Hemi engine 340-350 hp | 6.1 s | |
| 2005–2018 | Dodge Ram 1500 R/T | V8 | 5.7 Chrysler Hemi engine 345 hp(06-08) / 390 hp(09-12) / 395 hp(13-18) | 5.7 s | |
| 2006–2010 | Dodge Charger R/T | V8 | 5.7 Chrysler Hemi engine 340-350 hp(06-08) / 370 hp(09-10) | | |
| 2006–2023 | Dodge Charger R/T | V8 | 5.7 Chrysler Hemi engine 370 hp | 5.3 s | |
| 2008–2023 | Dodge Challenger R/T | V8 | 5.7 Chrysler Hemi engine 375 hp (Manual) 372 hp (Automatic) | 5.0 s | |
| 1992–2002 | Dodge Viper RT/10 | V10 | 8.0 Chrysler Viper engine 400 hp(92-95) / 450-460 hp(96-02) | | |

== Other vehicles using R/T properties ==
| Years | Vehicle | Type | Engine | 0–60 mph (0–100 km/h) | Photo |
|---|---|---|---|---|---|
| 1992–1993 | Chrysler Phantom R/T | I4 | 2.2 Chrysler Turbo III DOHC K engine 224 hp 2.5 Chrysler Turbo II engine 168 hp | --- | |
| 1991–1995 | Chrysler Spirit R/T | I4 | 2.2 Chrysler Turbo III DOHC K engine 224 hp 2.5 Chrysler Turbo II engine 168 hp | --- | |
| 1971–1978 | Chrysler VH Valiant Charger R/T | I6 | Chrysler Hemi-6 Engine 302 hp | --- | |
| 1969 | Dodge Charger Daytona | V8 | 7.0 Chrysler 426 Hemi engine 425 hp 7.2 Chrysler RB 440 Magnum 375 hp | --- | |
| 2006–2009 | Dodge Charger Daytona | V8 | 5.7 Chrysler Hemi engine 350 hp(06-08) / 370 hp(09) | --- | |
| 1971 | Dodge Charger Super Bee; 1971 | V8 | 7.0 Chrysler 426 Hemi engine 425 hp 7.2 Chrysler RB 440 Six Pack 385 hp | --- | |
| 1968–1970 | Dodge Coronet Super Bee | V8 | 7.0 Chrysler 426 Hemi engine 425 hp 6.3 Chrysler B 383 Magnum 335 hp | --- | |
| 1997–1998 | Dodge Ram 1500 SS/T | V8 | 5.9 Chrysler LA Magnum engine 245 hp | --- | |
| 2004–2005 | Dodge Ram 1500 Rumble Bee | V8 | 5.7 Chrysler Hemi engine 345 hp | --- | |

== Concept vehicles using R/T properties ==
| Vehicle | Type | Engine | 0–60 mph (0–100 km/h) | Photo |
|---|---|---|---|---|
| 1997 Dodge Copperhead | V6 | 2.7 Chrysler LH engine 220 hp | --- | |
| 1997 Dodge Sidewinder | V10 | 8.0 Chrysler Viper engine 640 hp | --- | |
| 1999 Dodge Charger R/T Concept | V8 | 4.7 Chrysler engine 325 hp | --- | |
| 2001 Dodge Super 8 Hemi | V8 | 5.7 Chrysler Hemi engine 353 hp | --- | |

== Engine gallery ==
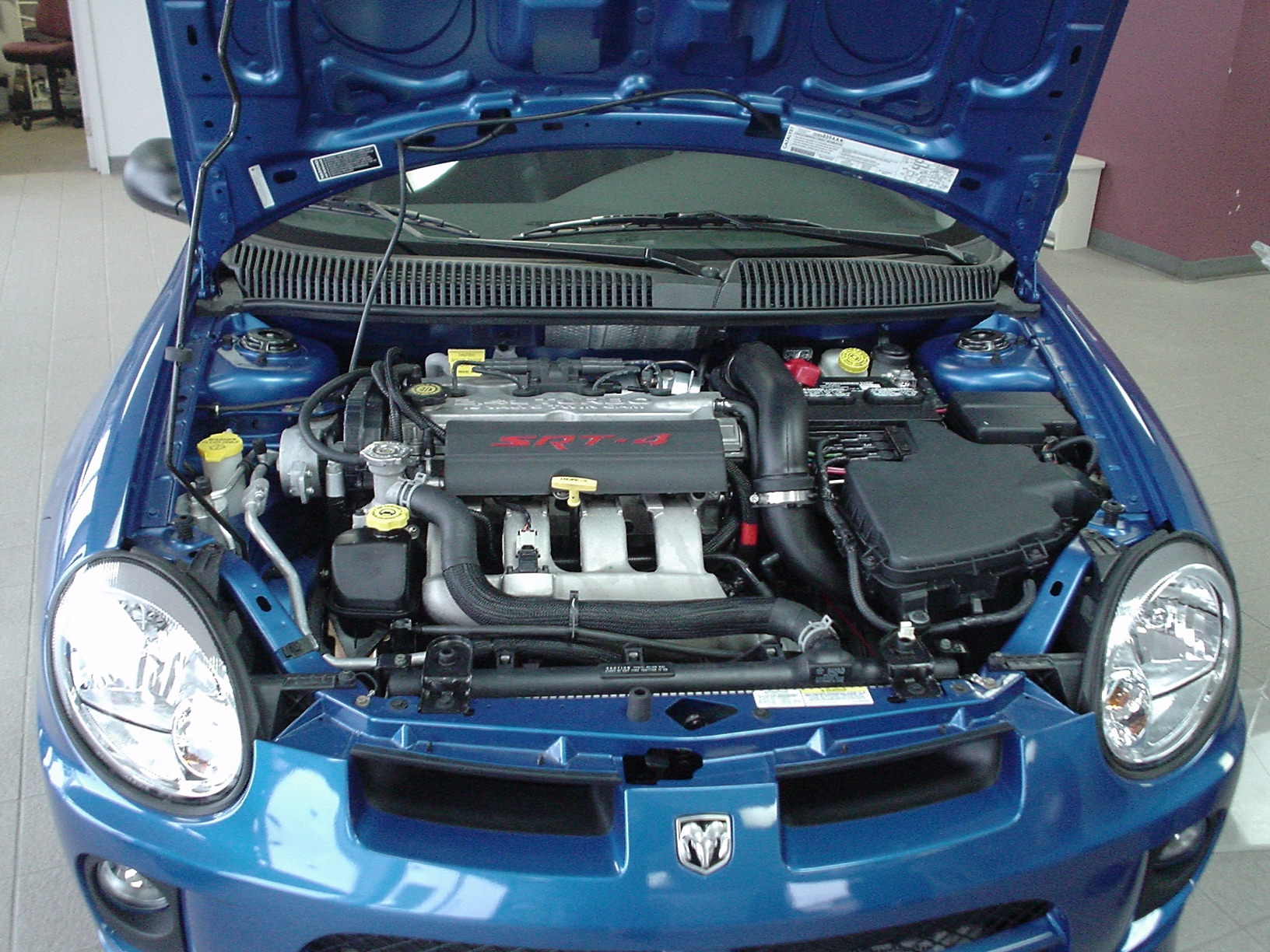
The Turbocharged 2.4L I4 Chrysler Neon Engine that used in Dodge Neon SRT-4 is also used in Dodge Stratus R/T.

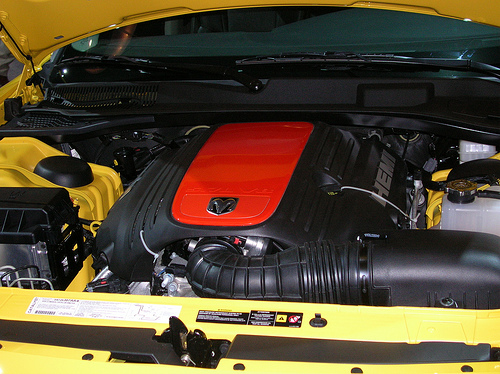
The Chrysler 5.7 Hemi Engine is used in most of modern R/T V8 vehicles.

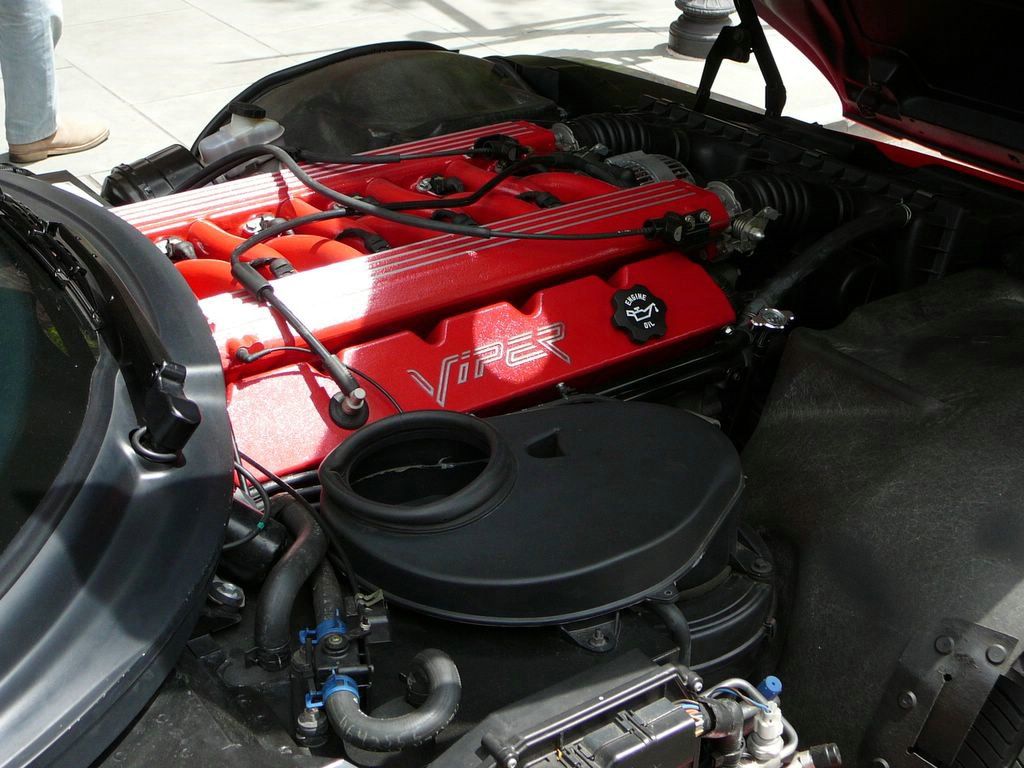
A picture of the 8.0 Chrysler LA Viper engine which is used in the Dodge Viper RT/10 and the concept Dodge Sidewinder.

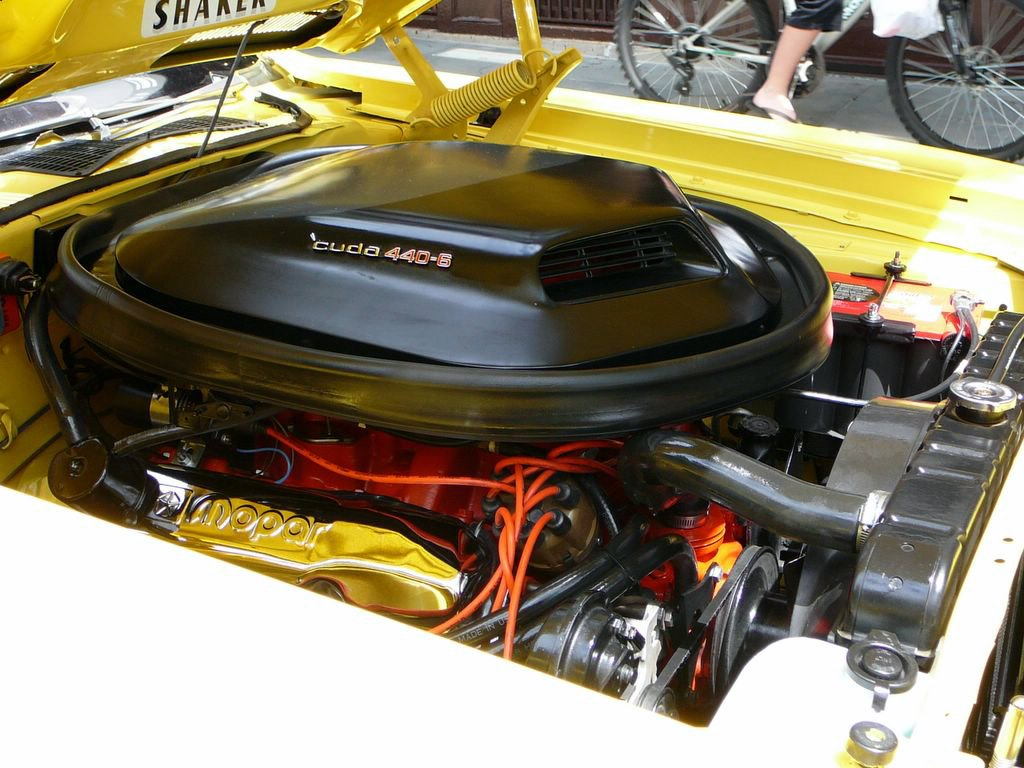
The 7.2 Chrysler 440 SixPack engine, this was used in most of classic muscle cars made by Dodge and Plymouth.

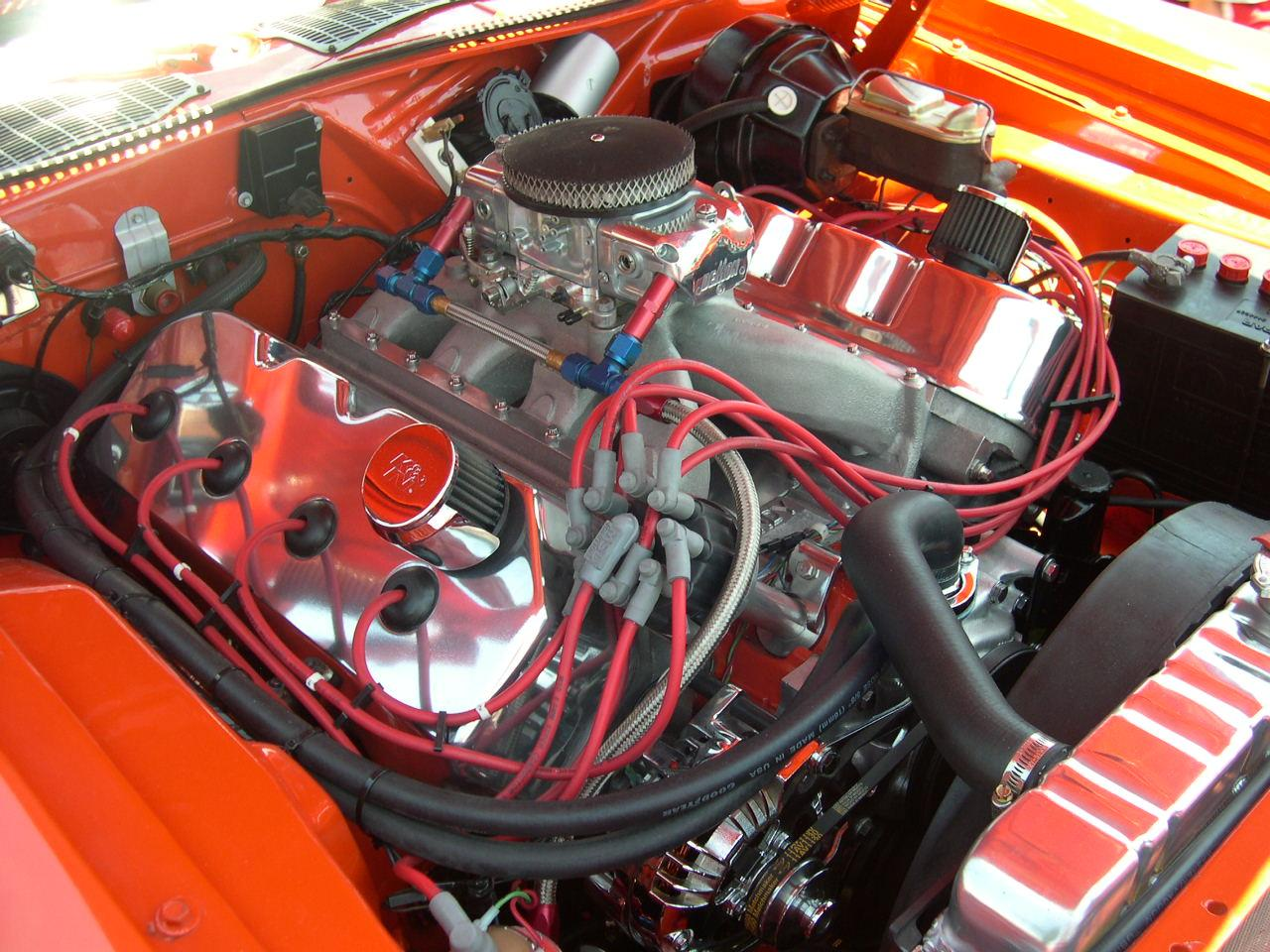
A picture of the classic 7.0 Chrysler Hemi engine with a power of 425HP, the modern aftermarket – or custom – 426 Hemi produce nearly to 600 HP.

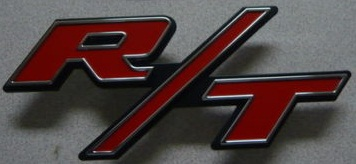
R/T logo on a Dodge

== See also ==
- BMW M Power
- Chrysler Group SRT Vehicles
- Chevrolet SS Vehicles
- Mercedes-AMG
