= Dodge M-series chassis =

The Dodge M-series chassis were a line of heavy-duty frames used under various Class A motorhomes from 1968 to 1979. M-series chassis use a Dana 60 or 70 or Spicer M70 solid rear axles with leaf springs. Frames were used by Winnebago, Champion, Apollo MotorHomes and several other RV manufacturers. The line was offered in four ratings, M-300, M-375 (also known as M-400 between 1969–1973), M-500, and M-600 depending on the application. The M600 was offered with the Rockwell F-130-NX rear axle, with a 4.88:1 gear ratio.

By 1979, Chrysler Corporation no longer sold incomplete chassis and ended production of the M series.

The M series was available with three engines during its production: The 318 polysphere Chrysler A engine, the 413 cid, and the 440 cid Chrysler RB engine.
