= List of Chrysler engines =

== Chrysler ==
=== Four cylinder ===
1926–1933: Flathead 4

1981–1995: K Engine

1994–2010: PowerTech

2007–present: World Engine

- 1.8, 2.0, and 2.4 "World Engine" (2007–2020)
- 2.0 and 2.4 "Tigershark" (2013–present)

=== Six cylinder ===
1924–1959: Flathead 6

1959–2000: Slant-6

1970–1981: Hemi-6 (Australia)

1987–2004: 3.9L/238 LA & Magnum

1989–2011: 3.3 & 3.8 OHV V6

1993–2010: SOHC V6

1998–2010: LH Engine

2002–2013: PowerTech

2010–present: Pentastar

2021-present: Chrysler Hurricane

=== Eight cylinder ===
1930–1950: Flathead 8

1951–1958: FirePower (Hemi)

1955–1958: Polyspheric V8

1968–1969: Chrysler Ball-Stud Hemi (A279)

==== Small block ====
1956–1961: Chrysler A - Chrysler's first small-block V8.

1964–1992: Chrysler LA

- 273
- 318
- 340
- 360

1992–2003: Magnum

- 318
- 360

1999–2009: PowerTech

2003–present: Hemi

- 5.7L Hemi - The smallest modern Hemi engine, called the Eagle, introduced in 2002.
- 6.1L Hemi - A larger modern Hemi, 2004–2010.
- 6.4L Hemi - A larger bore modern Hemi engine, called the Apache, introduced in 2011.
- 6.2L Hemi - A supercharged Hemi engine, called the Hellcat, introduced in 2014.
- 6.2L Hemi - A supercharged Hemi engine, called the Demon, introduced in 2017.

==== Big block ====
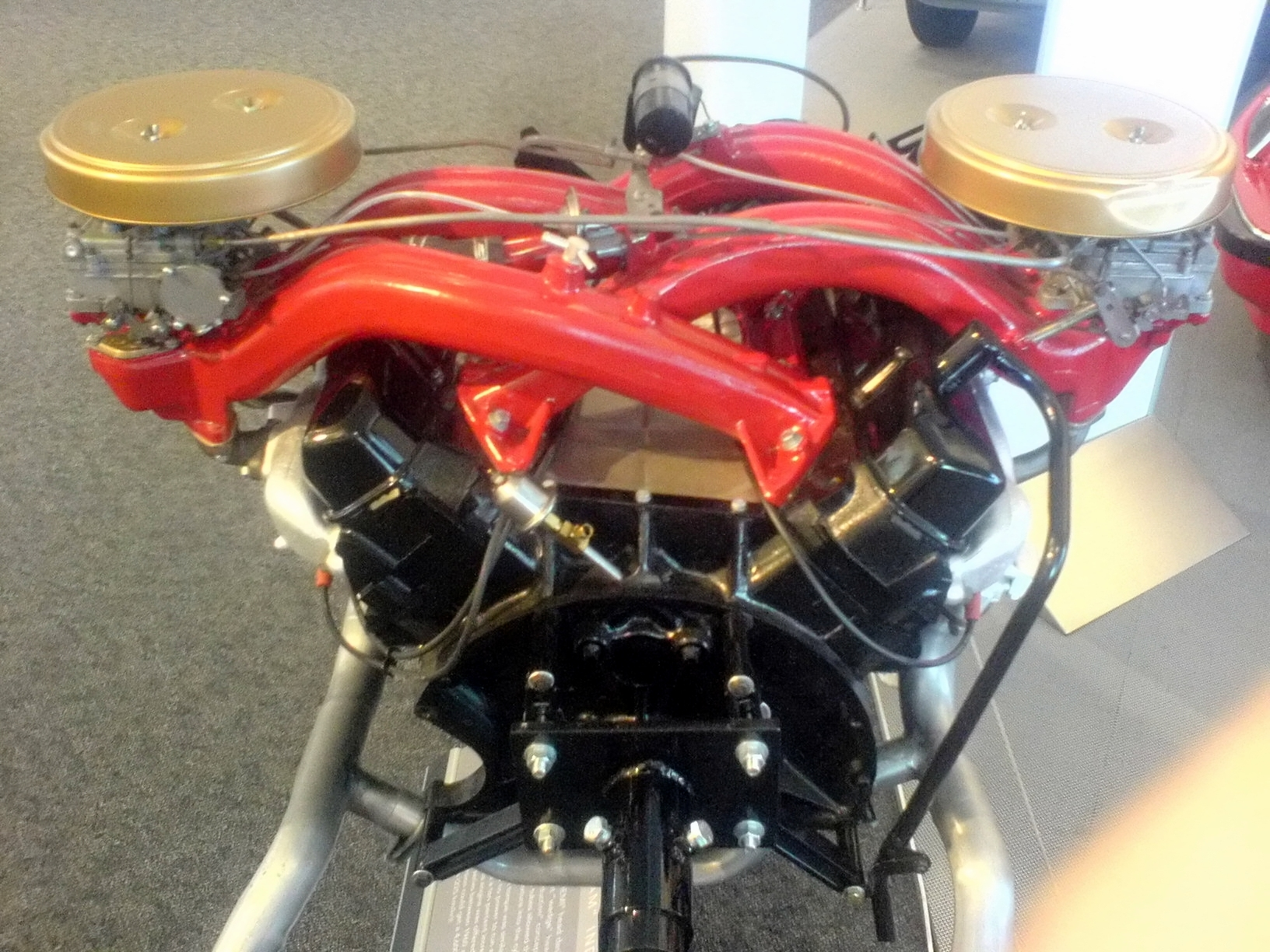
A Chrysler 413 cu in (6.8 L) "Sonoramic" engine, factory-equipped with tuned-length twin long-ram intakes

1958 - 1978: Chrysler B

- 350
- 361
- 383
- 400

1959–1978: Chrysler RB

- 383
- 413
- 426 Wedge

1966-1978: Chrysler RB

- 440

1964–1971: Hemi

- 426

=== V10 ===
- Viper V10 - An evolution of the LA design, executed in aluminium.
- Magnum V10 - A similar cast-iron engine was made for Dodge Ram trucks.

=== Turbine ===
1954–1980: Turbine Engine

== AMC ==
Chrysler acquired a number of engines after acquiring AMC in 1987.

=== Four cylinder ===
- 1987–2002: AMC I-4

=== Six cylinder ===
- AMC I-6

=== V8 ===
- AMC 360 - American Motors' "GEN-3" V8s were introduced for the 1970 model year in AMC passenger automobiles. The "GEN-3" engines were available in Jeep utility vehicles starting in 1971. It is not the same as Chrysler's 360 V8. Chrysler continued production of the AMC 360 engine after the 1987 buyout of AMC to power the full-size Jeep Wagoneer (SJ) SUV that was produced until 1991. It was one of the last carbureted car/truck engines built in North America. Chrysler never used this engine in any other vehicle.

== Cummins ==
=== Six cylinder ===
Cummins B-Series

- 6BT - 5.9 L Diesel I6 used in 1989–1998 Dodge Ram
- ISB - 5.9 L Diesel I6 used in 1998–2007 Dodge Ram
- ISB6.7 - 6.7 L Diesel I6 currently used in Dodge Ram

== Mitsubishi ==
=== Three cylinder ===
- Mitsubishi 3A92 1.2 L - Used in the Dodge Attitude (2015–present)

=== Four cylinder ===
- Orion G12B 1.4
- Orion G15B 1.5
- Orion 4G15 1.5
- Saturn 4G32 1.6
- Saturn G32B 1.6
- Sirius 4G61 1.6 DOHC
- Saturn 4G37 1.8
- Astron G52B 2.0
- Sirius 4G63 2.0 DOHC
- Sirius G63B 2.0
- Sirius 4G64 2.4
- Astron G54B 2.6

=== Six cylinder ===
- 1978–1979: 6DR5
- 2.5 L 6G73 - Used in the Chrysler Sebring, Dodge Avenger, Chrysler Cirrus, and Dodge Stratus
- 3.0 L 6G72 - Used in the Plymouth Acclaim/Dodge Spirit and 1987–2000 Dodge Caravan/Plymouth Voyager, also Dodge Dynasty, Chrysler LeBaron, Chrysler TC, Chrysler New Yorker, Dodge Daytona, Dodge Stealth, Chrysler Sebring (Coupe), Dodge Stratus (Coupe), Dodge Shadow ES, and Plymouth Duster

== Mercedes-Benz ==
=== Four cylinder ===
- OM611 - 2.1 L (130 cu in) diesel (2002–2004)
- OM646 - 2.1 L (130 cu in) diesel (2004–2010)
- OM651 - 2.1 L (130 cu in) diesel (2011–present)

=== Five cylinder ===
- OM647 - 2.7 L (160 cu in) diesel

=== V6 ===
- OM642 - 3.0 L diesel V6 used in 2006–2010 Chrysler 300, 2005–2010 Jeep Grand Cherokee and 2006–2010 Jeep Commander
- M112 E32 - 3.2 L V6 used in 2003-2007 Chrysler Crossfire.
- M112 E32 ML - Supercharged 3.2 L V6 used in 2005-2006 Chrysler Crossfire SRT-6.

== VM Motori ==
=== Four cylinder ===
- 425 OHV 2.5 L (150 cu in) diesel
- R425 DOHC 2.5 L (150 cu in) diesel
- R428 DOHC 2.8 L (170 cu in) diesel
- RA428 DOHC 2.8 L (170 cu in) diesel
- A428 DOHC 2.8 L (170 cu in) diesel

=== Five cylinder ===
- 531 OHV - 3.1 L (190 cu in) diesel

=== Six cylinder ===
- EcoDiesel 3.0 L (180 cu in) diesel

=== V6 ===
- A630 DOHC - 3.0L diesel V6 (EU-spec) used in Jeep Grand Cherokee and Chrysler 300/Lancia Thema
- L630 DOHC - 3.0L diesel V6 (US-spec) used in Jeep Grand Cherokee and Ram 1500

== Fiat ==
=== Three cylinder ===
- Firefly 1.0 L Turbo Multiair II (2018–present)
- Firefly 1.0 L BSG MHEV (2020–present)

=== Four cylinder ===
- FIRE 1.4 L Turbo Multiair (2012–present)
- Firefly 1.3 L Turbo Multiair II (2018–present)
- E.torQ 1.6 and 1.8 L (2014–present)
- Multijet 1.6, 2.0, and 2.2L diesel (2014–present)
- Multijet 3.0L Iveco JTD diesel (2014–present)

== PRV (Peugeot, Renault, Volvo) ==
=== V6 ===
- 1989–1990: 3.0L PRV engine

== Hyundai ==
=== Four cylinder ===
- Hyundai Alpha engine 1.4 and 1.6 L (used in 2005-2018 Dodge Attitude)

== Others ==
- Chrysler UK
  - 1.5 L Hillman four
- Renault
  - J8S 2.1 L (128.1 cu in) diesel
  - Douvrin 2.2 L (134.3 cu in)
- Volkswagen
  - 1.7 L
  - 2.0 TDI PD diesel
- Simca Type 315
- Tritec 1.6 (1999–2007)
