= Dodge Custom 880 =

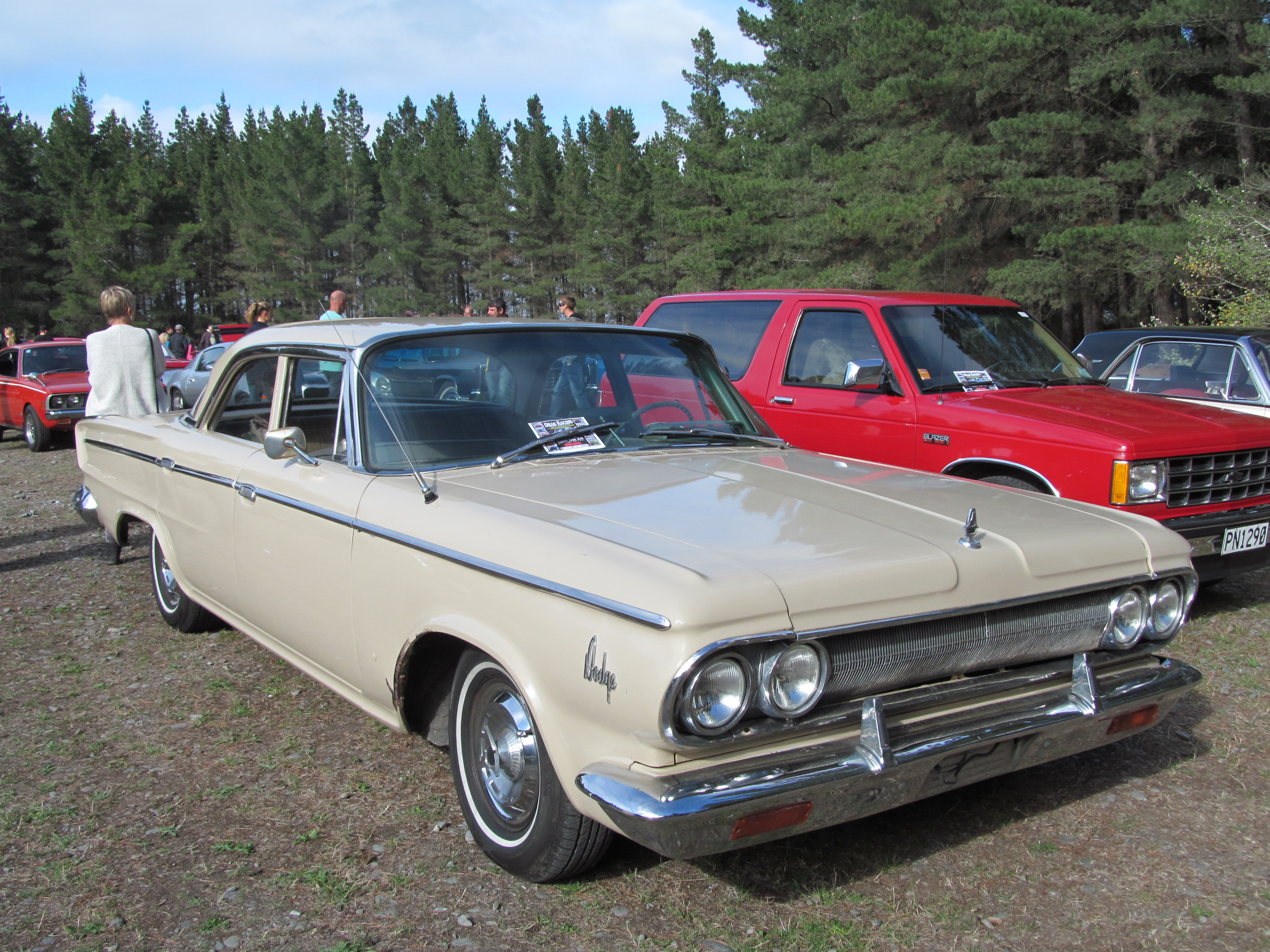
- 1963 Dodge Custom 880 four-door sedan

Overview
- Manufacturer: Dodge (Chrysler)
- Model years: 1962–1965
- Assembly: United States: Hamtramck, Michigan (Dodge Main Factory)

Body and chassis
- Class: Full-size
- Related: Chrysler Newport; DeSoto Firedome; Plymouth Suburban (1961)

Powertrain
- Engine: 361 CID B V8 (1962–1964); 383 CID B V8 (1963–1965); 413 CID RB V8 (1965); 426 CID RB V8 (1965)
- Transmission: 3-speed manual 3-speed Torqueflite automatic

Dimensions
- Wheelbase: 122 in (3,099 mm)
- Length: 213.5 in (5,423 mm)
- Width: 79 in (2,007 mm)

Chronology
- Predecessor: Dodge Coronet (full-size 1959)
- Successor: Dodge Polara (full-size 1965)

The Dodge Custom 880 is an automobile that was marketed by Dodge from 1962 through the end of the 1965 model year. It was positioned as Dodge's product offer in the mid-price full-size market segment and to help fill the void in Chrysler's lineup left by the discontinuation of DeSoto in 1961. A cheaper version, the Dodge 880, was also offered for 1963 and 1964.

== Origins ==
The Custom 880 was developed as a new full-size Dodge for the 1962 model year.

An often repeated story recounts that after Virgil Exner suffered a heart attack, William C. Newberg, Chrysler's president, overheard and misunderstood what Chevrolet chief Ed Cole said about Chevrolet's standard cars being downsized for 1962. As a result, Chrysler designers were forced to take the planned 1962 Dodge full-size line and shorten the design to fit a more compact wheelbase in a last-minute effort to compete with what was supposed to be a smaller new Chevrolet. However, there is debate if the smaller car GM was developing was going to be the conventional Chevy II to offset the Corvair or a new mid-sized automobile that would become the 1964 Chevrolet Chevelle. The new A-body was intended to battle Ford's mid-size Fairlane. Nevertheless, Chevrolet's 1962 full-size lineup was slightly larger than the 1961 models. The mid-trim Chevrolet Bel Air (on a 119 in (3,023 mm) wheelbase) was .5 in (13 mm) longer, although the car weighed 45 lb (20 kg) less than its 1961 predecessor.

The Dodge Polara and Dart introduced for 1962 were built on a 3 in (76 mm) shorter (116 in (2,946 mm)) wheelbase and were 7 in (178 mm) shorter overall than the comparable Chevrolet. This meant Dodge did not have a full-sized model according to the classifications at that time. Ford also brought their new intermediate- or mid-size Ford Fairlane and Mercury Meteor to market for 1962 with a 115 in (2,921 mm) wheelbase (116.1 in (2,949 mm) on all Meteors but wagons). They were roughly the same size as the new standard-size Dodges, which made the latest Chrysler models as intermediates by default. Furthermore, the Rambler Classic was also similarly sized and was introduced to North America in 1961.

Compounding the size issue were the car's designs. Their styling was different from the competition. The proposed curved side glass was deleted in favor of flat glass, which did not match the curve of the body sides. They also reduced the total glass area, which made the cars look smaller.

An unpopular design for the second year in a row, the 1961 models had awkward-looking "reversed" tailfins and a pinched grille, among other unusual features. Their unconventional styling and the cars' smaller overall size moved Chrysler to stem Dodge's sales and market share losses.

== Model years ==
=== 1962 ===
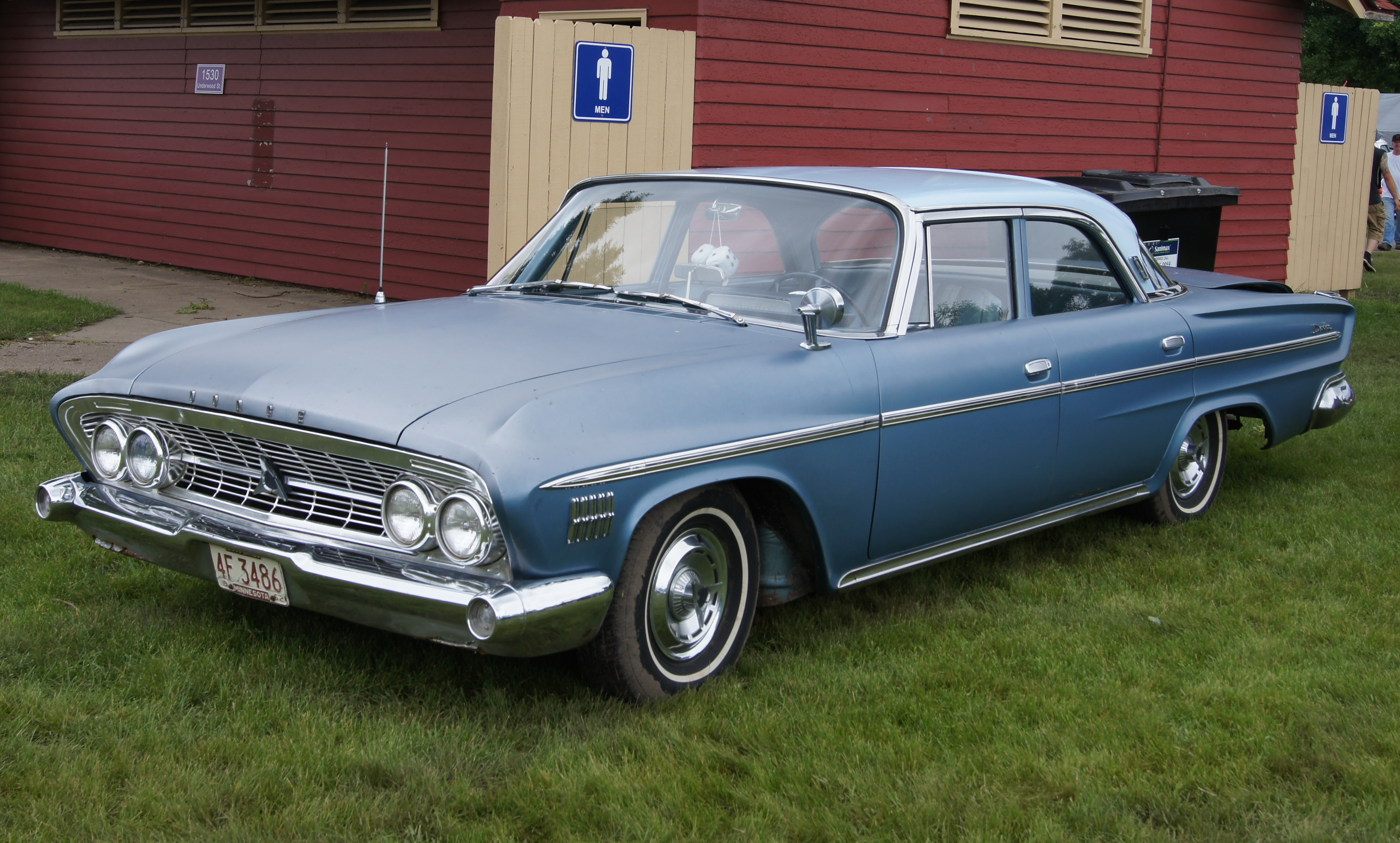
1962 Dodge Custom 880

For the 1962 model year, the Dodge shared the full-size body used by the Chrysler Newport and the non-letter 300 series. The models were differentiated by mating a modified 1961 Dodge Polara front clip to the Newport's de-finned rear quarter panels and passenger compartment. Since the 1962 Newport sedans had been created by combining a modified 1961 Newport front clip to the de-finned bodies of 1961 Dodge Polaras, this meant that the 1962 Custom 880 was essentially the reunion of the front and rear ends of the 1961 Dodge Polara, updated for 1962 by way of the 1962 Newport. A similar process was used to produce the 1962 Custom 880 wagon, except the wagon was created by mating the updated front end of a 1961 Polara to the body of a 1961 full-sized Plymouth wagon. This body-sharing allowed Dodge to launch the car in January 1962. It was fitted with a 361 cu in (5.9 L) 265 hp (198 kW) V8 engine from the B family; there were no optional engines.

The only visible cue at the front of the car that was different from the 1961 Dodge was the addition of a horizontal bar across the grille, bisected by Dodge’s new three-pointed "Fratzog" emblem in place of the stylized star bar from the 1961 Polara. The 1962 Custom 880 was identical to the Chrysler Newport from the rear, except for Dodge badging.

The model name Custom 880 was derived from Dodge’s numerical sub-model naming structure that was also used on the Dart and sportier models of the Polara. However, the model designation was not physically present on the car. Only "Dodge" badges on the car's rear quarter panels and decklid were applied. A six-way power seat was optional.

For the short 1962 run, the Custom 880 was available as a four-door sedan, two- or four-door hardtop, a two-door convertible, as well as in six- or nine-passenger station wagons that featured the Chrysler hardtop (no center or B-pillar) body design.

Custom 880 production totaled 17,500 for the 1962 model year.

=== 1963 ===
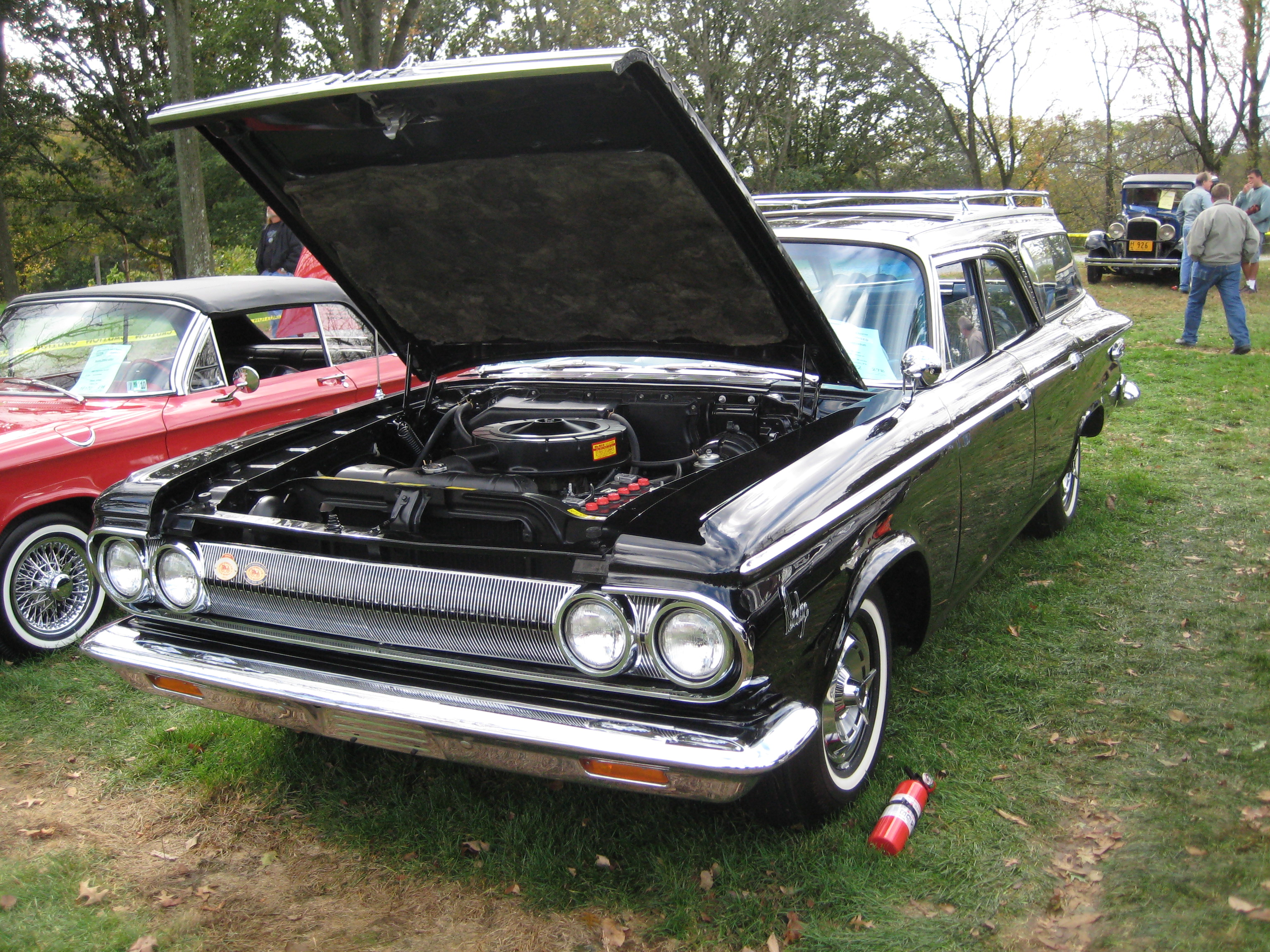
1963 Dodge 880 Sedan Wagon

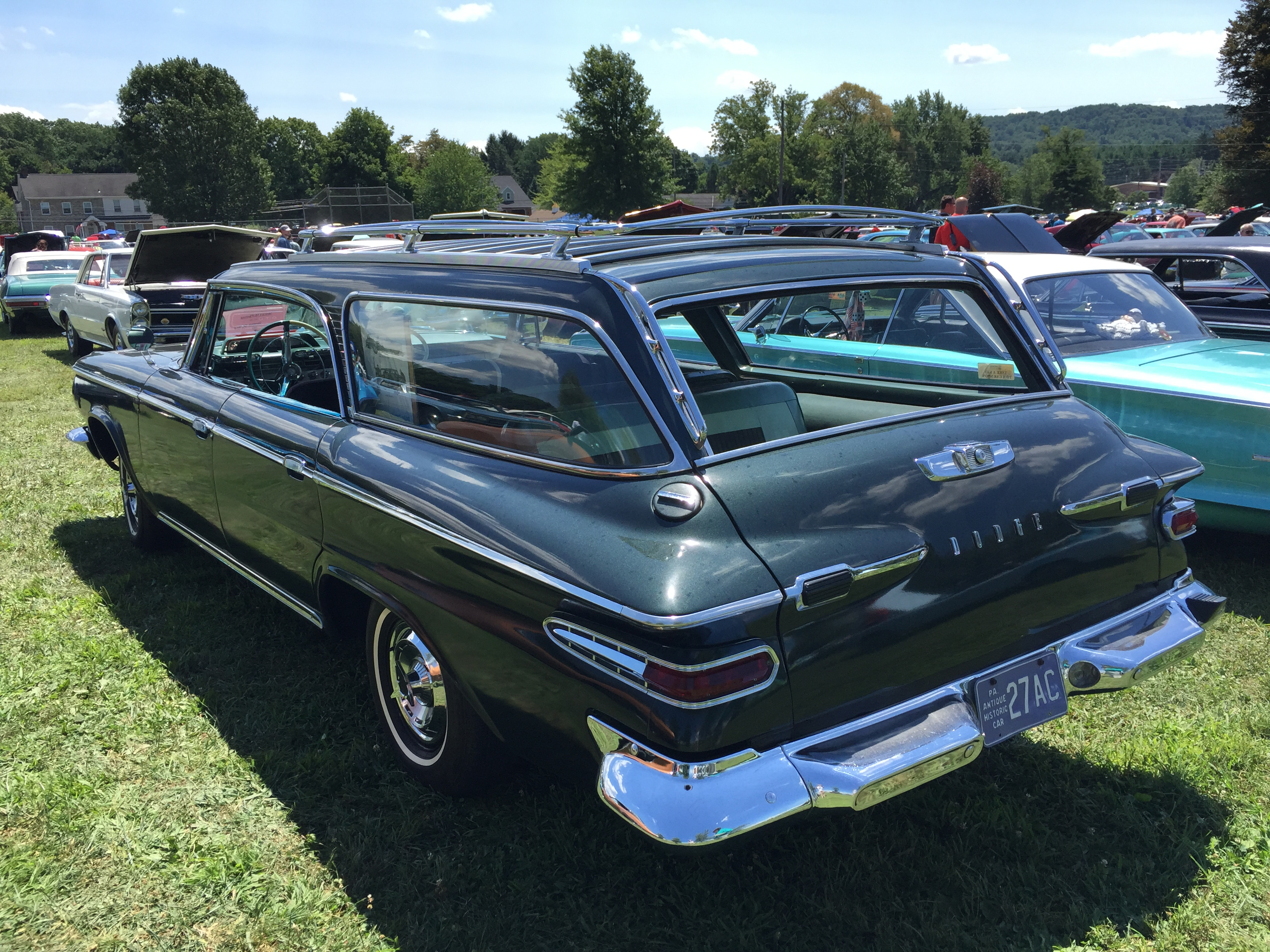
1963 Dodge Custom 880 Hardtop Wagon

For the 1963 model year, the Custom 880 series included a new base model, the 880, available only as a pillared four-door sedan or a station wagon. Chrysler-branded cars were redesigned for 1963, leaving the 880s body unique to Dodge, although the car was still produced alongside the now-different Chrysler. There was also an optional engine, the 305 hp (227 kW) 361 cu in (5.9 L) two-barrel V8.

Dodge designers created an entirely new look for the car ahead of the cowl, fronted by a new convex grille in a very long oval shape, which shared visual similarities with the AMC Rambler. Straighter front fenders flanked a hood with a depressed central section featuring the Dodge name in block letters above the grille. The designers integrated the new Chrysler's front bumper into the design.

At the rear, there was less change, although the car received restyled taillights. Set in large chromed housings, they were mounted to the carryover quarter panels and imparted a Dodge familial appearance to the rear, as one of Dodge's styling hallmarks of the time was round taillights.

The new base-model 880 station wagons utilized the pillared body in six- and nine-passenger models, while the Custom-series wagons featured the pillarless hardtop design. With Chrysler no longer using the body and interior trim elements, the Custom 880s were better appointed than during the 1962 model year.

A total of 28,200 vehicles were produced in 1963, of which 5,600 were station wagons.

=== 1964 ===
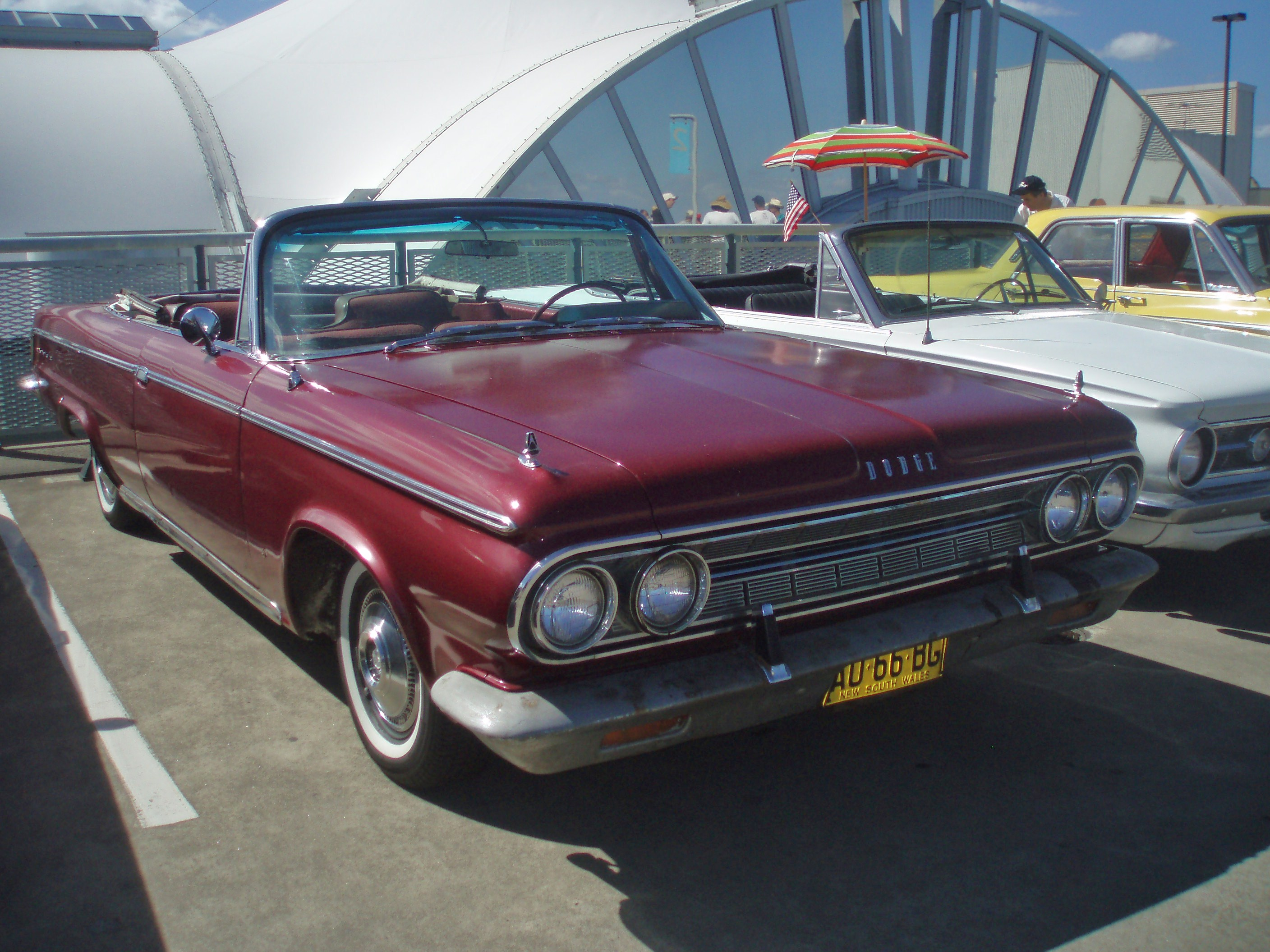
1964 Dodge Custom 880 Convertible

The 880 and Custom 880 received their most significant and final redesign of the 1960 body for the 1964 model year. The rear body contours were squared up with new decklids, wraparound rectangular taillights, and new quarter panels. Four-door models received a new roofline that was used on the Chrysler New Yorker until 1962. The grille was also updated featuring a concave design with a central horizontal break spanning the distance between the headlights.

The Custom 880s included stainless steel rocker panel trim, foam-padded seats, and a grooved stainless steel panel that spanned the distance between the taillights. The Customs, at the top of the 880 line, also received better interior appointments than the base models. The engines remained as they had been in 1963.

Because of tooling expenses, station wagon bodies — which were also shared with Chrysler models — did not receive all of the changes applied to non-wagon models. Most notably, wagons continued to feature the heavy rear horizontal blade stamping first seen on the 1961 Plymouth wagons. The station wagons continued in both pillared (880) and hardtop (Custom 880) models. However, this would be the final year for the hardtop wagon — Dodge and Chrysler being the last American automotive brands to offer the style. Station wagons also received rectangular taillights that wrapped around the sides of the vehicle.

All 880s and Custom 880s received a revised instrument cluster layout, replacing the previous design, which had been in use with little change since 1961. An oil pressure gauge was standard. Front leg room was 41.9 inches.

The 880 and Custom 880 received favorable press reviews, especially for their redesign. Sales for 1964 totaled 31,800 vehicles, a record for the model.

=== 1965 ===
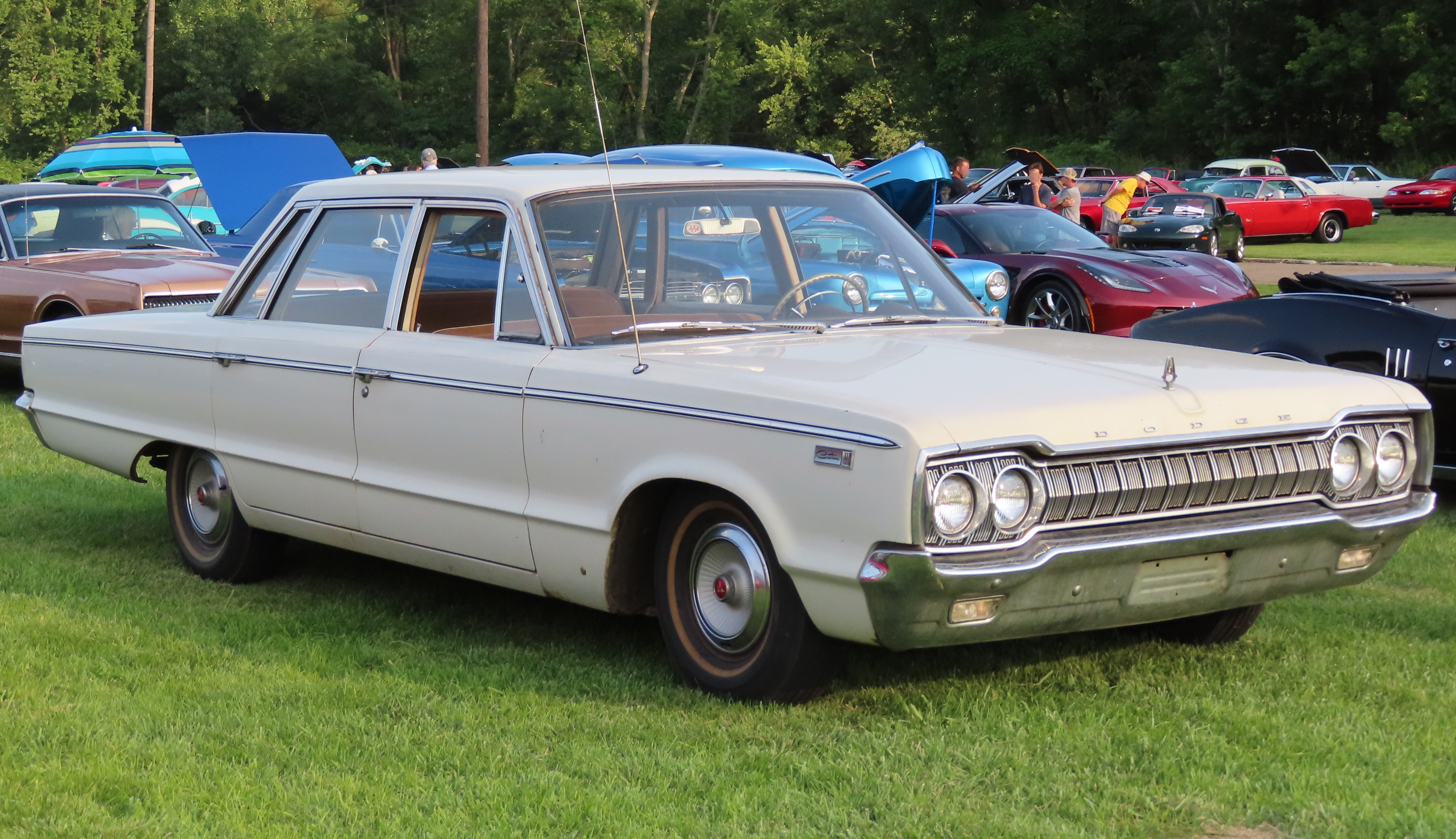
1965 Dodge Custom 880 4-door sedan

The 1965 model year cars were the first to fully incorporate Elwood Engel's influence on Chrysler's overall corporate design themes, although he joined the company in 1961. Gone were the relatively extreme curves and angles that were a legacy of the final Exner-styled cars. Engel's design philosophy, which was encouraged by Chrysler chairman Lynn Townsend, took Chrysler's products in the direction of rectilinear geometric angles; rectangular and trapezoidal shapes dominated Dodge's full-size designs for the year.

The introductions of the 1965 models also allowed Chrysler to rectify its 1962 mistake and reintroduce a full-sized Dodge Polara to the public. The "new" Polara took the position formerly held by the 880, with the Custom 880 taking the top trim level. The luxurious new Dodge Monaco, which was available only as a two-door hardtop, was the top-of-the-line model produced by Dodge in 1965 and was designed to compete against the Ford Galaxie 500 LTD and Chevrolet Caprice, both new top-line luxury models for 1965. An AM/FM radio and a seven-position tilt steering wheel were optional.

All big Dodges, 880, Monaco, and Polara, now featured the same body and styling. Gone was the 1961 Chrysler design. All Custom 880s came with the standard features found in the Polara and added foam-padded seats and stainless steel window frames on station wagons and sedans. Hardtops and convertibles featured all-vinyl interiors. Custom 880s also featured a pillared six-window "town sedan" body that was unavailable in the Polara series. The series also featured the first Dodge-brand "wood" trimmed station wagon since the early 1950s, a look achieved through DI-NOC appliqué framed in stainless steel trim. A total of 23,700 Custom 880s, all with V8 engines, were built during the model year.

The 361 cu in (5.9 L) V8 was replaced by a 270 hp (201 kW) version of the 383 cu in (6.3 L). A more powerful 383 included a four-barrel carburetor rated at 315 hp (235 kW). There was also an optional 340 hp (254 kW) 413 cu in (6.8 L) RB V8, and at the top of the line was the 365 hp (272 kW) 426 cu in (7.0 L) Wedge V8 that was available with a four-speed manual transmission.

== Discontinuation ==
Dodge discontinued the Custom 880 nameplate at the end of the 1965 model year in the United States. To move its top full-size series upscale for 1966, the division adopted the Monaco name for all of the former Custom 880 models, except for the six-window sedan, which was discontinued. The original Monaco hardtop added the 500 label for 1966 and marketed as a competitor to the Pontiac Grand Prix.

== Production figures ==
Combined Dodge 880 and Custom 880 annual production figures rounded to the nearest 100:

- 1962, 17,500
- 1963, 28,200
- 1964, 31,800
- 1965, 23,700
- Total: 101,200
