= Chrysler ball-stud hemi =

Automobile engine designed by Chrysler Corporation

The ball-stud hemi (known internally as A279 and affectionately as the BS Hemi) was an automobile engine designed by Chrysler Corporation in the late 1960s. It never entered production.

Intended to deal with the troubles created by the low-production 426, of which only about 9,000 were built from 1966 to 1972), as well as the different architectures of the higher-volume 383 cu in (6.3 L) and 400 cu in (6.6 L) B and 440 cu in (7.2 L) RB V8s, the ball-stud hemi was to be suitable for high-volume manufacture at low cost while generating high performance. Chrysler hoped to replace three block and two head designs with the ball-stud design. It was to be based on a low-deck block and available in 400 cu in (6.6 L) (4.34 by 3.38 in (110 by 86 mm)) and 440 cu in (7.2 L) 4.32 by 3.75 in (110 by 95 mm)) displacements (and Chrysler considered a 444 cu in (7.3 L), which could have used stock 4.34 in (110 mm) 400 cu in (6.6 L) pistons), while the new valvetrain would cut both weight and cost, as well as making it possible to fit it in a greater variety of models.

The A279 initially used the B-block head bolt pattern, which "badly hampered" its exhaust ports, forcing the use of a serpentine flow around some of the outer bolts This was changed late in development, but not before some tooling based on the original design had already been created. This meant the head was not truly hemispherical, but had more intake port area than exhaust (3.575 in^{2} (23.06 cm^{2}) versus (2.488 in^{2} (16.05 cm^{2})).

Its intake valves were nearer the intake manifold, exhaust valves nearer the exhaust pipes. The staggered "poly" arrangement improves airflow by "reducing valve shrouding and eliminating the sharp runner turns" of inline valve arrangements. It also had equally spaced intake ports (similar to the 428SCJ), thereby achieving "more consistent mixture distribution" than the Wedges. Chrysler used a 14 mm (0.55 in) spark plug, rather than the typical 18 mm (0.71 in), in an effort to fit it as centrally as possible in the combustion chamber.

The intake and exhaust valves were the same size as the 426's, the 2.25 in (57 mm) intake canted at 15° from the bore centerline, the 1.94 in (49 mm) exhaust at 6°. By contrast, the B-block's were 2.08 in (53 mm) and 1.74 in (44 mm).

Compared to the wedge, the ball-stud block had two additional clean-out holes to remove casting sand, because the large bore made coolant in the water jacket very significant, and an additional oil drainback hole at either end of the block, due to demand for lubrication of the rocker arms. Suggestions to increase the size of the oil pump pickup to 3/8 in (9.5 mm) (compared to the 426's 1/2 in (12.7 mm)) never passed the endurance testing stage.

Pistons were to be cast aluminum. Compression ratio was targeted as 10.5:1; on the surviving engine, it was measured at 9.8:1. Forged connecting rods used the Wedge's 3/8 in (9.5 mm) hardware, as opposed to the Hemi's 7/16 in (11.1 mm), but would nonetheless have been considered high-performance parts.

The intake was to be a single Carter ThermoQuad, of greater flow than any previously used, on a dual-plane intake manifold, while dual four-barrels were never even considered, in the face of toughening emissions standards. A split-level (vertically split, rather than horizontally divided) intake was also experimented with.

Chrysler hoped to have the ball-stud in production sometime between 1971 and 1973. In testing, it proved able to outperform the single four-barrel carburetted A134 440, and lagged behind the eight-barrel A102 426 Street Hemi. About one year of development was put in before the project was stopped, in late 1969. It was a victim of increasing demand for emissions controls and a reduction in emphasis on performance, as the "horsepower wars" wound down. Moreover, Chrysler was suffering "severe financial stresses" that nearly brought the company down, so the new production tooling and facilities were now uneconomic.

Estimates of the number built vary from three to twelve. Only one is known to survive.

== See also ==
- Chrysler Hemi engine
- List of Chrysler engines

== Sources ==
- Kirschenbaum, Al. "Mopar Mystery Motor". Hot Rod, 3/86, pp. 71–8.
