= Dodge Super Bee =

Car models marketed by Dodge

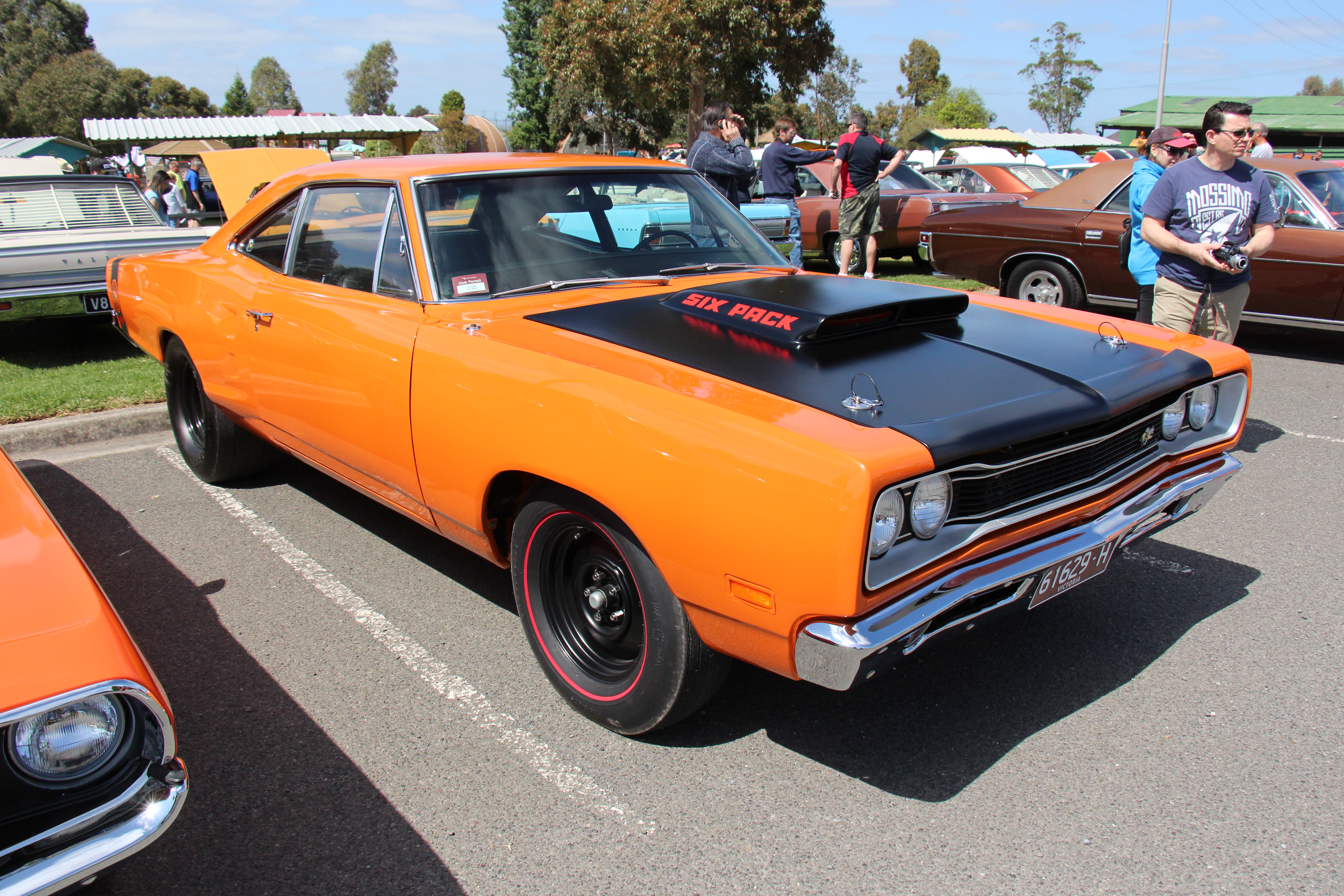
- 1969 Dodge Coronet Super Bee A12 "Six Pack"

Overview
- Manufacturer: Chrysler Corporation (1968–1980); DaimlerChrysler (2007); Chrysler LLC (2008–09)
- Production: 1968–1971; 1970–1980 (Mexico only); 2007–2009; 2012–2013; 2027–

Body and chassis
- Class: Muscle car
- Layout: FR layout AWD layout (2027–)

The Dodge Super Bee is a mid-sized muscle car marketed by Dodge, which was produced for the 1968 through 1971 model years. In Mexico, the Super Bee model was based on a compact Chrysler platform and was marketed from 1970 until 1980.

The Super Bee model name returned on versions of the Dodge Charger (LX) four-door sedans for the 2007, 2008, 2009, 2012, 2013, and 2023 model years.

== 1968–1970 Chrysler B platform ==
1968–1970
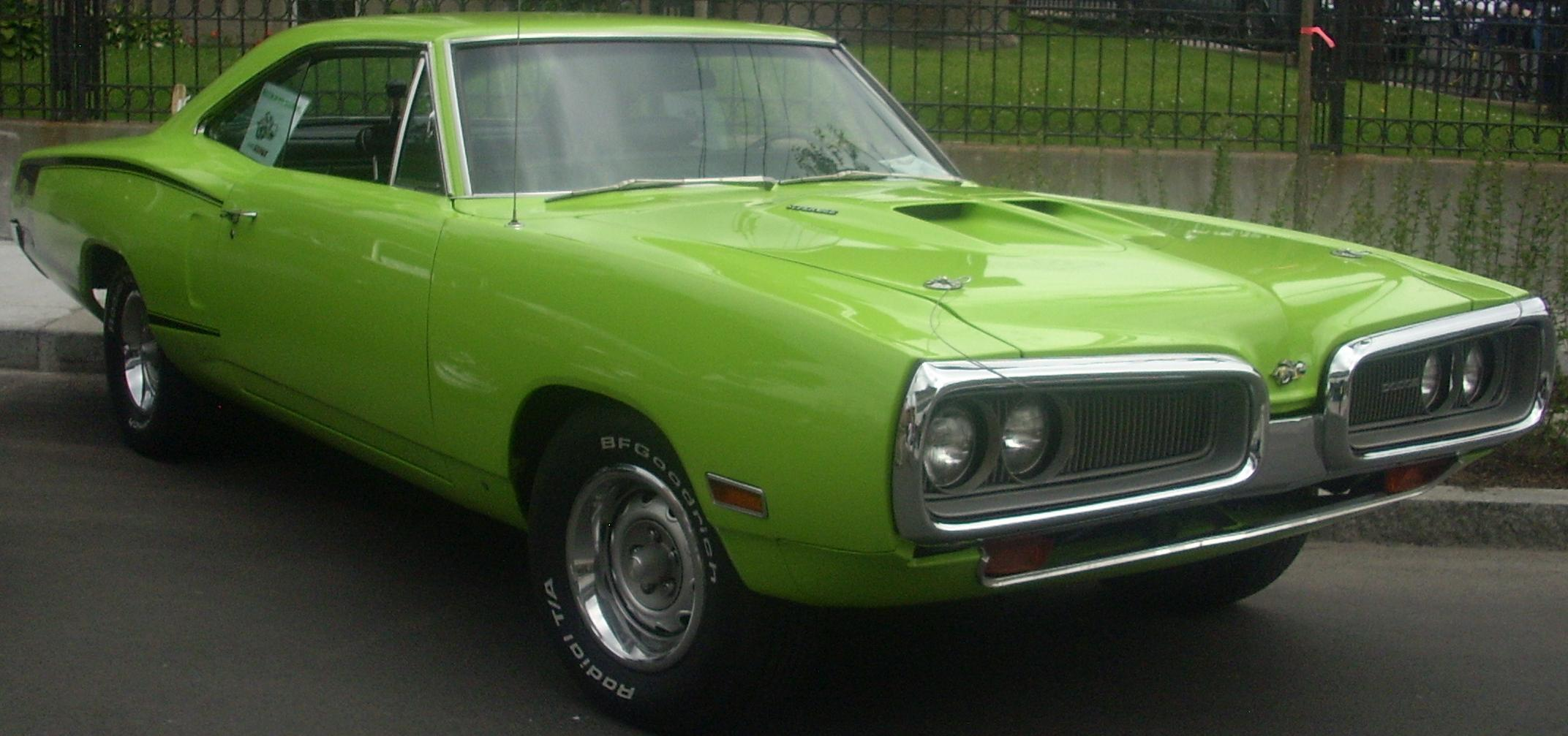
- 1970 Dodge Coronet Super Bee

Overview
- Production: 1968–1970
- Assembly: Newark, Delaware, United States

Body and chassis
- Platform: B-body
- Related: Dodge Coronet; Plymouth Satellite; Dodge Charger; Plymouth Road Runner; Plymouth GTX; Plymouth Belvedere

Powertrain
- Engine: All V8s: 383 cu in (6.3 L) Magnum; 426 cu in (7.0 L) Hemi; 440 cu in (7.2 L) Six-Pack (not offered 1968)
- Power output: Horsepower: 335 hp (250 kW) (Magnum); 390 hp (291 kW) (Six-Pack); 425 hp (317 kW) (Hemi); Torque: 425 lb⋅ft (576 N⋅m) (Magnum); 490 lb⋅ft (664 N⋅m) (Six-Pack, Hemi)
- Transmission: 4-speed manual 3-speed Torqueflite automatic

Dimensions
- Wheelbase: 117.0 in (2,972 mm)

The original Dodge Super Bee was based on the Dodge Coronet two-door coupe, and was produced from 1968 until 1970. It was Dodge's low-priced muscle car and rebranded and mildly distinguished from the Plymouth Road Runner. The origin of the name, "Super Bee", has its basis in the "B" Body designation pertinent to Chrysler's mid-sized cars, including the Road Runner and Charger.

=== 1968 ===
Plymouth's Road Runner sales were enough to have Dodge Division General Manager, Robert McCurry, request a similar model from the Dodge Styling office. Senior designer, Harvey J. Winn, won a "contest" with the name "Super Bee" and a new logo design based on the Dodge "Scat Pack" Bee medallion. The design of the first Super Bee was influenced by the 1968 Coronet convertible and the show car's interior was built by the Alexander Brothers. The show car was introduced at the 1968 Detroit Auto Show.

Although the two cars are similar in external appearance, the Super Bee was slightly heavier - approx. 65 lb (29 kg) - and rode on a 117-inch (2,972 mm) wheelbase compared to the Road Runner's 116 in (2,946 mm) wheelbase. In addition to minor external differences, such as larger rear wheel openings, the bumblebee tail stripe and fancier grille, and the taillight ornamentation, the Super Bee also used actual diecast chrome-plated "Bee" medallions. These three-dimensional medallions were prominently mounted in a raised position in the grille/hood area and the trunklid/taillight area of the car throughout the first three years of production.

The Super Bee used a dash cluster from the Dodge Charger, while the 4-speed manual transmission cars received a Hurst Competition-Plus shifter with Hurst linkage; this shifter compared to the Road Runner's less expensive Inland shifter and linkage. Due to the higher-quality accessories attached to the Super Bee, the car was sold at a higher price in comparison to the Plymouth version and this had a negative effect on sales.

The Super Bee was available with the Hemi engine. This option raised the price by 33%, and 125 were sold. The 1968 model was available only as a two-door coupe, with two engine options, the base 335 hp (250 kW) 383 Magnum, and the 426 Hemi, rated at 425 hp (317 kW).

The Super Bee included a heavy-duty suspension, an optional Mopar A833 4-speed manual transmission, and high-performance tires. Outside, a stripe (with the bee logo) was wrapped around the tail.

=== 1969 ===
A hardtop version joined the existing pillared coupe body in 1969 and the front and rear ends received revisions. The front end featured a more aggressive design with a 'squeezed' appearance to the surround of the headlights and in towards the central grille section while the rear end featured new horizontally-themed tail lights.

A new optional twin-scooped air induction hood known as the "Ramcharger" became available. This particular option was coded N96 and was the counterpart to the Plymouth Road Runner's "Coyote Duster" air induction hood. The "Ramcharger" hood featured forward-facing scoops.

A "six-pack" (three two-barrel Holley carburetors) version of Dodge's 440 cu in (7.2 L) engine was added to the offering list mid-year rated at 390 bhp (395 PS; 291 kW) at 4700 rpm and 490 lb⋅ft (664 N⋅m) at 3600 rpm of torque. The option code for this was A12, which changed the 5th digit of the VIN to M. These special order 1969 1/2 Dodge Super Bees are known as A12 M-code cars. The A12 package also equipped the cars with a Dana 60 axle with a 4:10 gear-ratio, heavy duty automatic transmission or a 4-speed manual, and a 'lift off' flat black scooped hood. Other components to the A12 package included heavy duty internal engine parts, black steel wheels with performance G70x15 tires, and heavy-duty 11-inch drum brakes. A total of 1,907 A12 M-code 440 Six Pack 1969 1/2 Dodge Super Bees were produced. This option fell half-way between the standard engine and the Hemi as a US$463 option. The 1969 model year included the base 383 Magnum, 440 Six Pack, and the 426 Hemi. The 440 Magnum (4bbl) was reserved for the Coronet R/T.

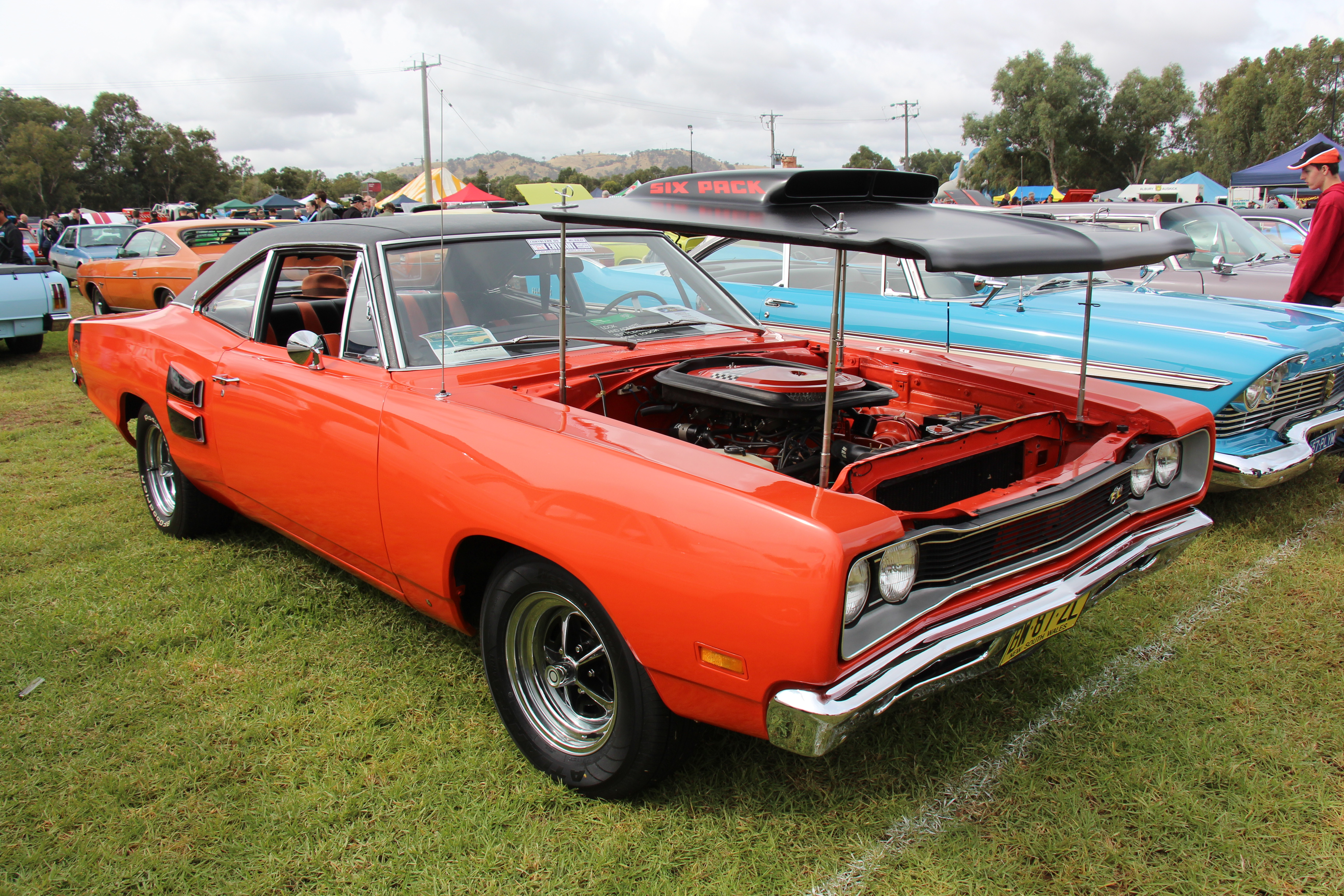
1969 Dodge Coronet Super Bee A12 "Six-Pack

=== 1970 ===
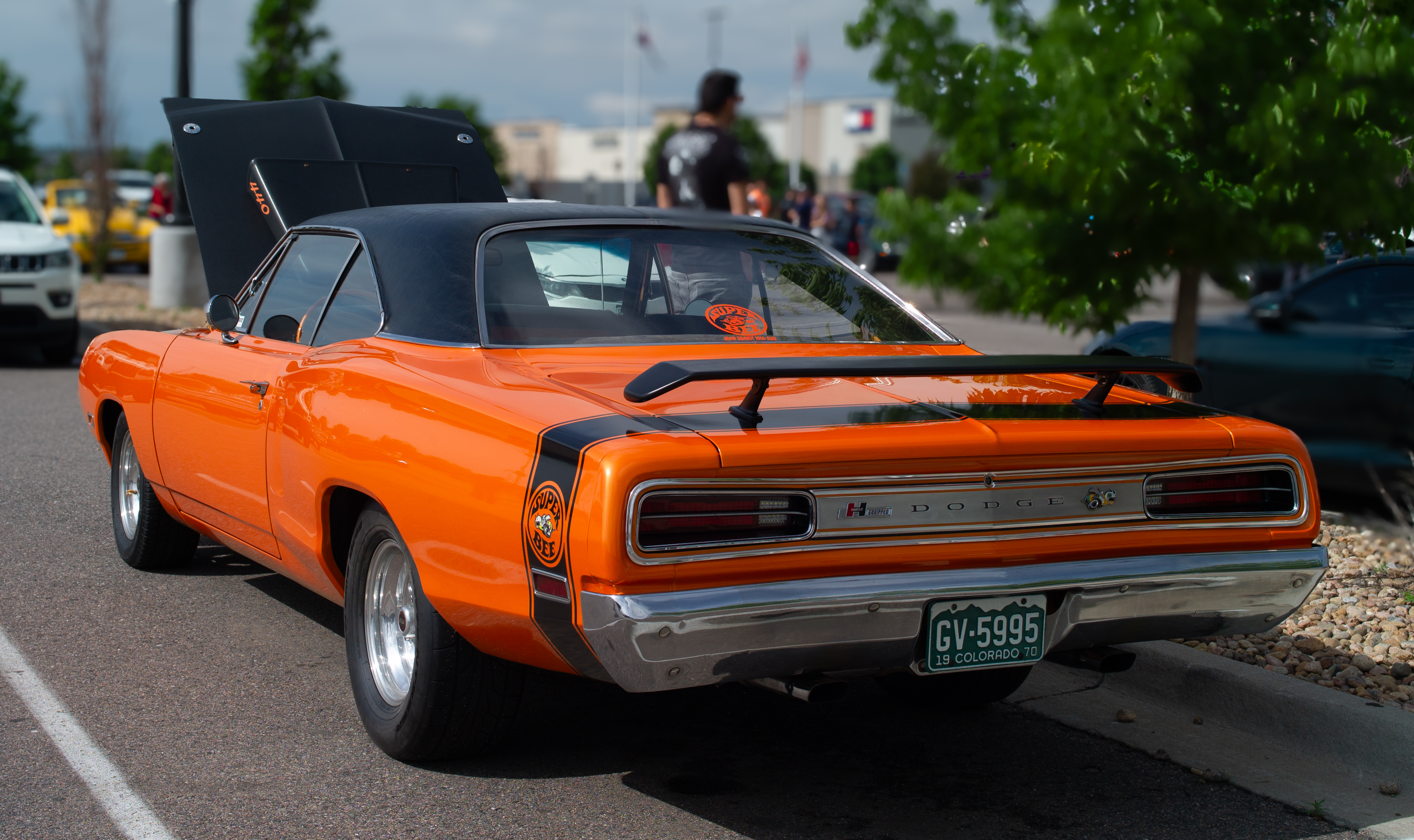
1970 Dodge Super Bee in Vitamin C Orange

For the 1970 model, the Super Bee received a redesign and a new front-end that consisted of a twin-looped front bumper that Dodge Public Relations referred to as "bumble bee wings". Sales fell for the year from 15,506 in 1970 to 5,054 in 1971—because of, or in spite of, this new look, with another sales pressure coming from higher insurance rates for performance cars; the similar Plymouth Road Runner and Plymouth Duster both experienced similar sales issues. In addition to the new looks, engine choices and "ramcharger" hood carried over from 1969, the 1970 cars from Dodge featured several new or improved options. For example, a "C- stripe" variant of the bumble stripe was offered, in addition to new high-back bucket seats, a steering column-mounted ignition and a "pistol grip" Hurst shifter on four-speed models.

Engines:

Model years	All V8s	Power output	Torque
1968–1970	383 cu in (6.3 L) "Magnum"	335 bhp (340 PS; 250 kW)	425 lb⋅ft (576 N⋅m)
1968–1970	426 cu in (7.0 L) Hemi	425 bhp (431 PS; 317 kW)	490 lb⋅ft (664 N⋅m)
1969–1970	440 cu in (7.2 L) Six-Pack	390 bhp (395 PS; 291 kW)	490 lb⋅ft (664 N⋅m)

Production:

1968: 7,842–7,717 (383), 125 (426 Hemi)
1969: 27,800–25,727 (383), 1,907 (440 Six Pack), 166 (426 Hemi)
1970: 15,506

== 1971 Chrysler B platform ==
1971
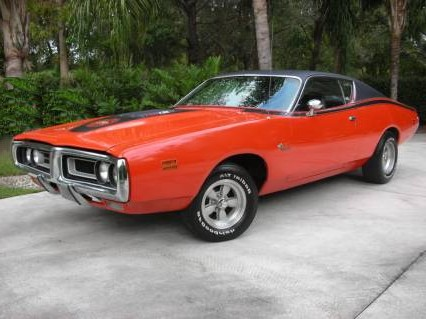

Overview
- Production: 1971
- Assembly: United States: Detroit, Michigan; Hamtramck, Michigan; Los Angeles, California; St. Louis, Missouri

Body and chassis
- Platform: B-body
- Related: Dodge Coronet; Plymouth Satellite; Dodge Charger; Plymouth Road Runner; Plymouth GTX

Powertrain
- Engine: 340 cu in (5.6 L) V8; 383 cu in (6.3 L) V8; 426 cu in (7.0 L) V8; 440 cu in (7.2 L) V8
- Transmission: 3-speed manual 4-speed manual Torqueflite automatic

The 1971 Coronet line was built in four-door sedan and station wagon body versions, the Super Bee model was moved to the platform used by the Charger. Since an R/T muscle car version of the Charger already existed, the Super Bee was promoted as the low-priced model in the line, selling at US$3,271. Production numbers of the Super Bee reached 5,054, including 22 with the Hemi engine.

1971 was the first and only year that a small block engine (340 4-bbl) became available in the Super Bee.

Engines:

- 1971: 340 in³ (5.6 L) Small-Block V8, 275 hp (205 kW)
- 1971: 383 in³ (6.3 L) Big-Block V8, 300 hp (224 kW)
- 1971: 440 in³ (7.2 L) Big-Block V8, 370 hp (276 kW)
- 1971: 440 in³ (7.2 L) Big-Block V8, 385 hp (287 kW)
- 1971: 426 in³ (7.0 L) Hemi V8, 425 hp (317 kW)
- 1972: 400 in³ (6.6 L) Big-Block V8, 320 hp (239 kW) (4,800 rpm, 410 lb⋅ft (556 N⋅m) torque 3,200 rpm)

The moniker was discontinued in the domestic market until the 2007 Super Bee, a version of the LX platform based Charger SRT8.

== Mexican Valiant Super Bee ==
First generation (Mexico)
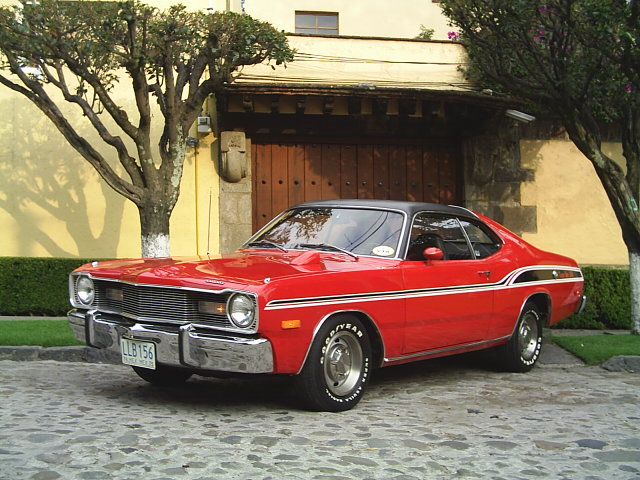

Overview
- Production: 1970–1976
- Assembly: Toluca, Mexico

Body and chassis
- Class: Sports Car
- Body style: 2-door coupe
- Layout: FR layout
- Platform: A-body
- Related: Dodge Dart; Plymouth Valiant; Plymouth Duster

Powertrain
- Engine: 318 cu in (5.2 L) LA V8 (1970–1973); 360 cu in (5.9 L) LA V8 (1974–1976)
- Transmission: 4-speed manual 3-speed TorqueFlite automatic

Chronology
- Predecessor: Plymouth Barracuda
- Successor: Dodge Magnum

=== 1970–1976 ===
In 1970, Chrysler of Mexico introduced the new Dodge Super Bee as a replacement for the company's previous sports car product, the Plymouth Barracuda. As the production and sale costs of the third-generation Barracuda in Mexico were too high, Dodge adapted the semi-fastback A-Body platform and introduced the Super Bee at the beginning.

The Super Bee was only available with the V8 318 engine (270 hp) and either a four-speed or three-speed manual transmission. The 1970 model was virtually identical to the Plymouth Duster (known in Mexico as the "Valiant Duster"), with side stripes and the Super Bee decals.

In 1971, Dodge differentiated the Super Bee from the Duster, by using the grille from the American Dodge Demon. The model's body was modified on one further occasion, in 1972, and, by 1973, the front of the Dodge Dart became the standard design for the entire A Body line-up; the Duster, Super Bee, Valiant, and Dart all consisted of the same front grille, with the rear tail lights constituting the only difference between the Super Bee and the Valiant. However, in 1976, the final year for the A body cars, the front grille of the Plymouth model became the standard design.

The Valiant Super Bee was equipped with the 318 V8 engine, with 270 hp, from 1970 to 1974; from 1975 to 1976, it contained the 360 V8 engine, with 270 hp—these engines had more power in Mexico than in the US, as Mexican anti-pollution laws were less strict in comparison to the US. Over the years, these models only received minor changes, such as new grilles, rear panels, and tail lights. The first generation was produced from 1970 to 1976; during the fall of 1975, Chrysler introduced the new F Body cars: the Dodge Aspen and Plymouth Volare (as 1976 models), while the Aspen R/T and Volare Road Runner were released as the sports versions.

Second generation (Mexico)
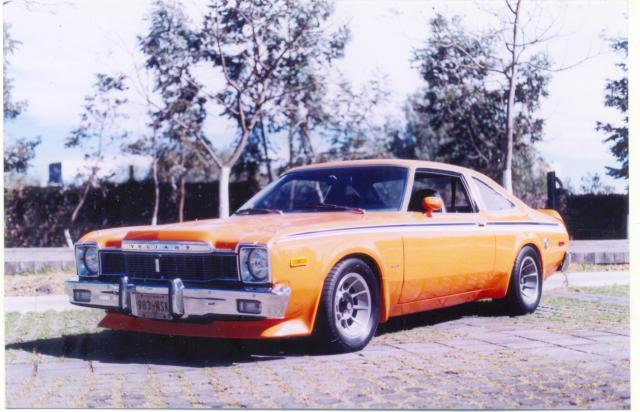

Overview
- Production: 1977–1980
- Assembly: Toluca, Mexico

Body and chassis
- Body style: 2-door coupe
- Platform: F-body
- Related: Dodge Aspen; Plymouth Volare

Powertrain
- Engine: 360 cu in (5.9 L) LA V8
- Transmission: 4-speed manual 3-speed TorqueFlite automatic

Dimensions
- Wheelbase: 108.7 in (2,761 mm)
- Length: 198.8 in (5,050 mm)
- Width: 73.3 in (1,862 mm)
- Height: 53.3 in (1,354 mm)

=== 1977–1980 ===
Chrysler de México continued to use old model names after they were dropped in the U.S. marketplace. The Dodge Aspen and Plymouth Volare were sold in Mexico as the Dodge Dart and the Valiant Volare, and the sports version was named the Valiant Super Bee. The Mexican Dodge Dart consisted of the front of the US Plymouth Volare and the rear of the Dodge Aspen, while the Mexican Valiant Volare and the Dodge Super Bee consisted of the front of the Dodge Aspen and the rear of the US Plymouth Volare.

The Super Bee was equipped with the 360 V8 engine and 270 hp, the three-speed Torque Flite automatic transmission (or the four-speed manual transmission), sports wide wheels, front spoiler, and a rear spoiler-style Trans Am with the Super Bee spelling (with an optional blind in the rear window). The federal highway patrol used Super Bee as a squad car. For the 1980-model year, the Super Bee received a new front with rectangular headlamps.

For the 1981 model year, the Dodge Diplomat was introduced in Mexico, under the name of Dodge Dart (replacing the Dodge Aspen), and was considered a luxury car. A new sports version of the 1981 Dodge Dart replaced the Valiant Super Bee and is now called the Dodge Magnum—the version consisted of the 360 V8 engine and 270 hp, with variations in transmissions: The three-speed automatic and the four-speed manual.

== 2007–2009 Charger (LX) platform ==
Dodge Charger (LX) versions
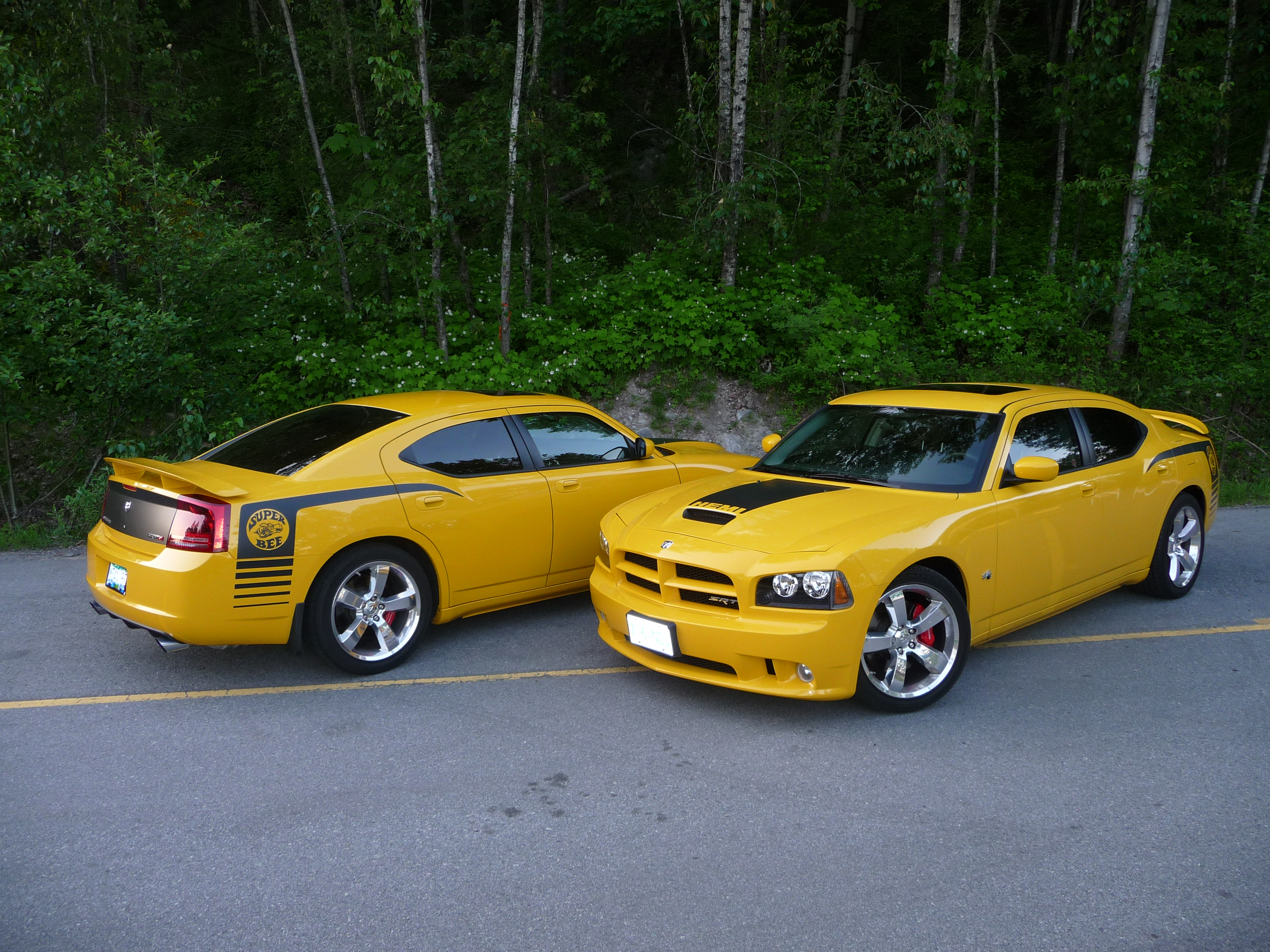
- 2007 Dodge Charger SRT8 Super Bees

Overview
- Production: 2007–2009
- Assembly: Brampton, Ontario, Canada

Body and chassis
- Class: Full size
- Body style: 4-door sedan
- Platform: Chrysler LX platform
- Related: Dodge Charger; Chrysler 300; Dodge Magnum; Dodge Challenger

Powertrain
- Engine: 6.1 L V8 Hemi
- Power output: 425 bhp (317 kW)
- Transmission: 5-speed W5A580 automatic

Dimensions
- Wheelbase: 304.8 cm (120.0 in)
- Length: 508.3 cm (200.1 in)
- Width: 189 cm (74.5 in)
- Height: 148 cm (58.2 in)

=== 2007 ===
A new 2007 Super Bee model was introduced at the 2006 North American International Auto Show. It is based on the Dodge Charger SRT8 and its exterior consists of special "Detonator Yellow" paint, a "Flat Black" hood, and fender "decals". The production version consisted of a hood decal, rather than an entirely black hood, and the "hockey stick" stripe on the side was changed from solid black to a dashed black stripe positioned at the bottom of the exterior. The wheels are fully polished and do not contain the silver-painted areas of the "stock" SRT8 Charger. The interior is completely black, with yellow accent stitching on the seats and shift knob; this is unlike the "two-tone" interior of the standard SRT8 Charger which consists of red stitching (this is the only model that contains such an interior, as the Charger interior changed in 2008). The appearance of the shifter "bezel" and center console resembles that of carbon fiber, and the Super Bee logo appears in the instrument cluster during "power-up", instead of the SRT logo.

It is a limited edition car, with 1,000 made for the 2007 model year with build dates as early as August 2006. Each car is built in Brampton Assembly Plant, then shipped to Windsor to have decals applied and a unique number plaque on the passenger side of the dash. The number sequence on the dash does not necessarily follow build order, as multiple "Bees" were shipped to Windsor by car carrier, and the order was not retained. It uses the same 425 bhp (317 kW; 431 PS) Hemi 6.1 L engine as the SRT8 versions of the Dodge Charger, Dodge Magnum, Dodge Challenger and Chrysler 300C.

=== 2008 ===
For the 2008 model year, the Super Bee was only made in "B5 Blue Pearl Coat" (sometimes listed as "Surf Blue Pearl"), reminiscent of the blue used by Chrysler vehicles in the 1960s and 1970s. Instead of fully polished SRT8 Charger wheels, the "pockets" are painted black on the ALCOA wheels. Blue accent stitching inside replaces the yellow found on the seats and steering wheel, but the Charger's interior was changed for 2008, so the dash and console are different than the 2007 version interior. This year also introduced touch screen navigation and an in-dash DVD player. It was based on the SRT8 model using the 6.1 L engine and had a production run of 1,000 units.

=== 2009 ===
For the 2009 model year, the Super Bee was only made in "Hemi Orange Pearl Coat", and was based on the SRT8 model. The Super Bee used the 6.1 L engine, and had a production run of 425. This year also introduced touch screen navigation and an in-dash DVD player with a hard drive. ALCOA wheels were standard this year only.

== 2012–2014 Charger (LD) platform ==
In 2011, the Super Bee SRT8 returned as a 2012 model on the redesigned Dodge Charger with the 392 Hemi engine (6.4 L) in "Stinger Yellow" and "Pitch Black" colors, with additional colors being added for 2013 and 2014. This version of the Super Bee returned to the name's roots as a "budget" muscle car, devoid of most luxury items yet maintaining high performance in the form of a less expensive SRT model.

== 2023 "Last Call" Charger (LD facelift) Super Bee ==
In March 2023, Dodge confirmed it would be discontinuing the Charger and Challenger lineup due to emissions standards. This prompted Dodge to release many "Last Call" special editions for the LD Charger and LA Challenger's final model year, in which the Super Bee would return to the Charger lineup for the first time since 2014.

This iteration of the Charger was a package for the 392 Scat Pack model, which itself had replaced the 2012-14 LD Super Bee, and production was limited to 1,000 units.

== 2027 "Super Bee Launch Edition" Charger ==
On August 7, 2026, Dodge announced a Super Bee variant of the Charger for the 2027 model year. It increases the output of the High Output Hurricane engine by 50 hp (51 PS; 37 kW) to 600 hp (608 PS; 447 kW), with the torque figure unchanged from 531 lb⋅ft (720 N⋅m), but with peak torque arriving at 3,000 rpm instead of 3,500. The Super Bee also features a redesigned front end, which Dodge claims increases downforce, as well as upgraded Brembo brakes, a new set of CDC dual-valve adaptive dampers, a stiffer rear anti-roll bar, and stiffer front bushings. Dodge claims a 3.6 second 0–60 mph (0–97 km/h) time and 11.8 second quarter mile time.
