= Chrysler B engine =

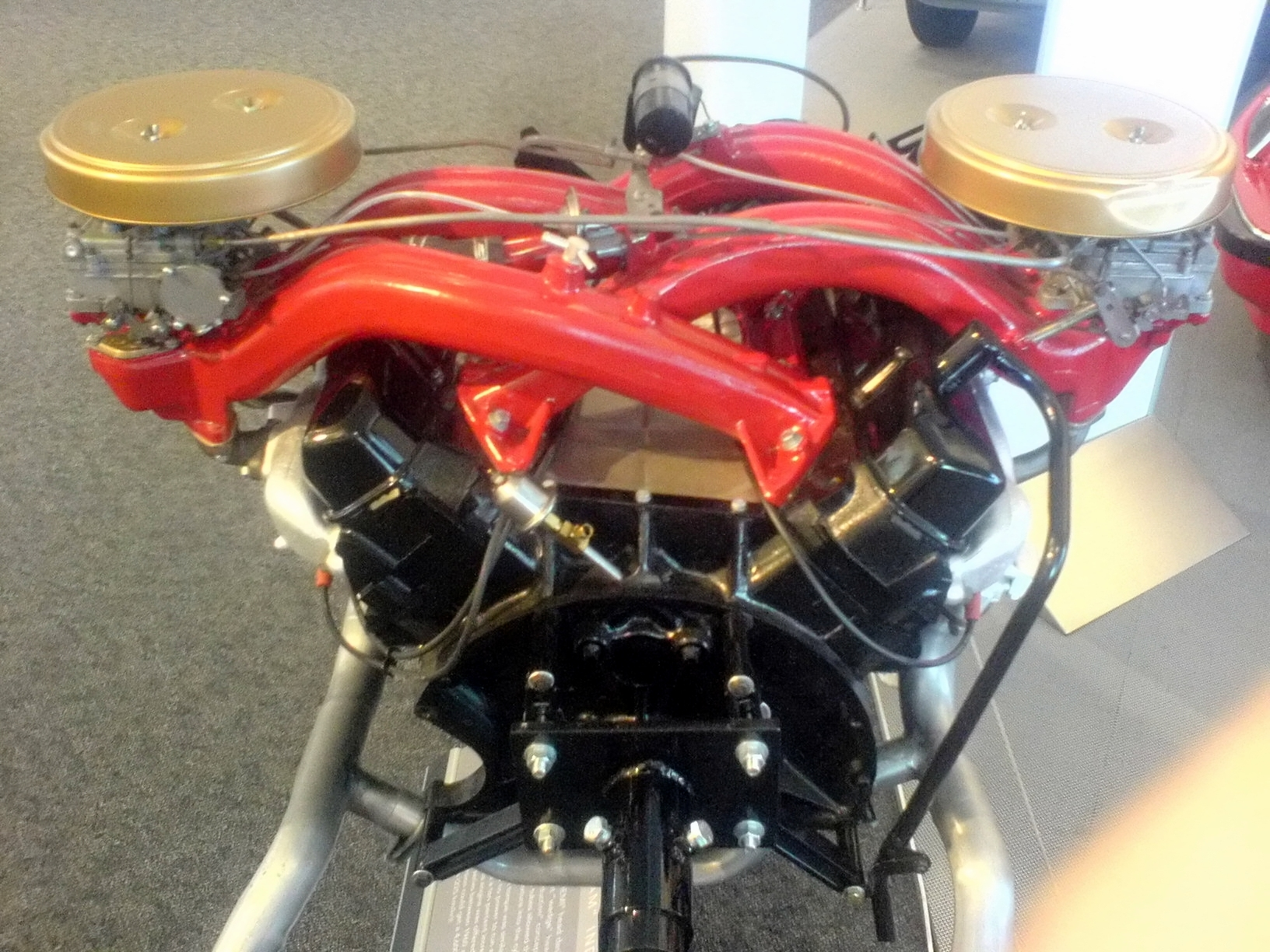
- 413 cu in (6.8 L) Cross Ram

Overview
- Manufacturer: Chrysler
- Also called: Chrysler RB engine; Chrysler Big-block
- Production: 1958 – August 1978

Layout
- Configuration: Naturally aspirated 90° V8
- Displacement: 350 cu in (5.7 L); 361 cu in (5.9 L); 383 cu in (6.3 L); 400 cu in (6.6 L); 413 cu in (6.8 L); 426 cu in (7.0 L) Wedge; 440 cu in (7.2 L)
- Cylinder bore: 4.062 in (103.2 mm); 4.125 in (104.8 mm); 4.030 in (102.4 mm); 4.342 in (110.3 mm); 4.187 in (106.3 mm); 4.250 in (108.0 mm); 4.320 in (109.7 mm)
- Piston stroke: 3.375 in (85.7 mm); 3.750 in (95.3 mm)
- Cylinder block material: Cast iron
- Cylinder head material: Cast iron
- Valvetrain: OHV 2 valves × cyl.
- Compression ratio: 8.2:1, 10.0:1, 10.1:1, 11.0:1, 12.0:1

Combustion
- Fuel system: Carter AFB or Holley carburetors; Fuel injection
- Fuel type: Gasoline
- Oil system: Wet sump
- Cooling system: Water-cooled

Output
- Power output: 170–425 hp (127–317 kW)
- Torque output: 305–530 lb⋅ft (414–719 N⋅m)

Chronology
- Predecessor: Chrysler Hemi engine

The Chrysler B and RB engines are a series of big-block V8 gasoline engines introduced in 1958 to replace the Chrysler FirePower (first generation Hemi) engines. The B and RB engines are often referred to as "wedge" engines because they use wedge-shaped combustion chambers; this differentiates them from Chrysler's 426 Hemi big block engines that are typically referred to as "Hemi" or "426 Hemi" due to their hemispherical shaped combustion chambers. The corporation had been seeking a smaller and lighter replacement for its FirePower engines, in part because new styling dictates meant moving the engine forward in the chassis which negatively affected weight distribution.

== Design ==
Design features of the B and RB engines include 17 capscrews per cylinder head, a cylinder block that extends 3 in (76.2 mm) below the crankshaft centerline, an intake manifold not exposed to crankcase oil on the underside, stamped-steel shaft-mounted rocker arms (race versions used forged steel rockers), and a front-mounted external oil pump driven by the camshaft. In order to provide a lower hood and center of gravity, the engine to be mounted lower than before. Apart from changing the engine dimensions and engine mount position, this also entailed reconsidering the distributor drive and oil pump locations. The oil pump could not be allowed to extend below the crank throw to avoid interfering with the steering linkage. The engineers moved the distributor to the front of the engine, at a 45-degree angle, which cleared the heater while allowing the oil pump to be located in front of the block - above the bottom of the crank's throw, clearing the steering linkage.

The 'B' series wedge engine was introduced in 1958 with 350 cu in (5.7 L) and 361 cu in (5.9 L) versions. The 361 would continue in production until the end of the series, albeit only for truck installation. The RB ("raised B") arrived one year after the launch of the B series engines, in 383 cu in (6.3 L) and 413 cu in (6.8 L) displacements. Unlike the previous B-engines, which had a 3 3/8-inch (85.7 mm) stroke, the RB engines had a 3 3/4-inch (95.3 mm) stroke.

For 1960, a "ram induction" system increased the 413's torque up to 495 lb⋅ft (671 N⋅m) on the Chrysler 300F versions.

The last 'B-RB' wedge-headed engine was produced in August 1978, ending the era of Chrysler "big-block" engines.

== B engines ==
All Low Block B-series engines have a 3 3/8 in (85.7 mm) stroke, a 9.98 in (253 mm) deck height and 6.358 in (161.5 mm) connecting rods, resulting in a 1.88:1 rod ratio.

=== 350 ===
The 350 cu in (5,735 cc) B engine was, along with the 361, the first production B engine, first available in 1958. It had a bore of 4 1/16 in (103 mm; 4.06 in). The 350 is classified as a big-block engine. All parts except for the pistons are fully compatible with the 361.

Vehicles using the B 350:

- 1958 DeSoto Firesweep
- 1958 Dodge Coronet
- 1958 Plymouth Fury

=== 361 ===
The 361 cu in B engine also introduced in 1958 was essentially the same as the 350 except with a larger 4 1/8 in (105 mm; 4.12 in) bore, for an actual displacement of 360.83 cu in (5,913 cc). In 1962, the Dodge Polara 500 came standard with a 305 bhp (227 kW) version of the 361 that had a four-barrel carburetor, dual-point distributor, and dual exhausts. Plymouth called their versions of the early B engine the Commando, variants of which included the Golden Commando and Sonoramic Commando. It produced 305 bhp (227 kW). DeSoto's B engine was named Turboflash and produced 295 bhp (220 kW). The Dodge standard version was a 2-barrel with 295 bhp (220 kW) called the Super Red Ram with an optional variant that was called the D500 and produced 320 bhp (239 kW).

The 361 would last until the end of the series, albeit for trucks only. In its early years, the 305-horsepower 361 was optional on many vehicles, and standard on, among others, the Dodge 880. The 361 had a fuel-injected version in 1958 only. Very few of the fuel-injected B engines were made and only a handful remain, since most were brought back to the dealer to be fitted with carburetors.

Vehicles using the B 361
- 1961–1964 Chrysler Newport
- 1959–1961 Chrysler Windsor (Canada only, sedans and coupes)
- 1958–1961 DeSoto
- 1958–1966 Dodge
- Dodge LCF series
- Dodge D series (medium to heavy duty)
- 1966 Dodge Charger
- 1959–1965 Plymouth
- Facel Vega HK500
- 1958–1961 Facel Vega Excellence (EX1)
- Jensen CV8
- 1963–1973 Cadillac Gage V-100 Commando APC (M75 Chrysler industrial engine, waterproof)
- 1973–1988 Cadillac Gage V-150 Commando APC (M75 Chrysler industrial engine, optional)
- 1966–1974 Food Machinery Corp. M-113 APC, (M75 Chrysler industrial engine, waterproof)

=== 383 ===
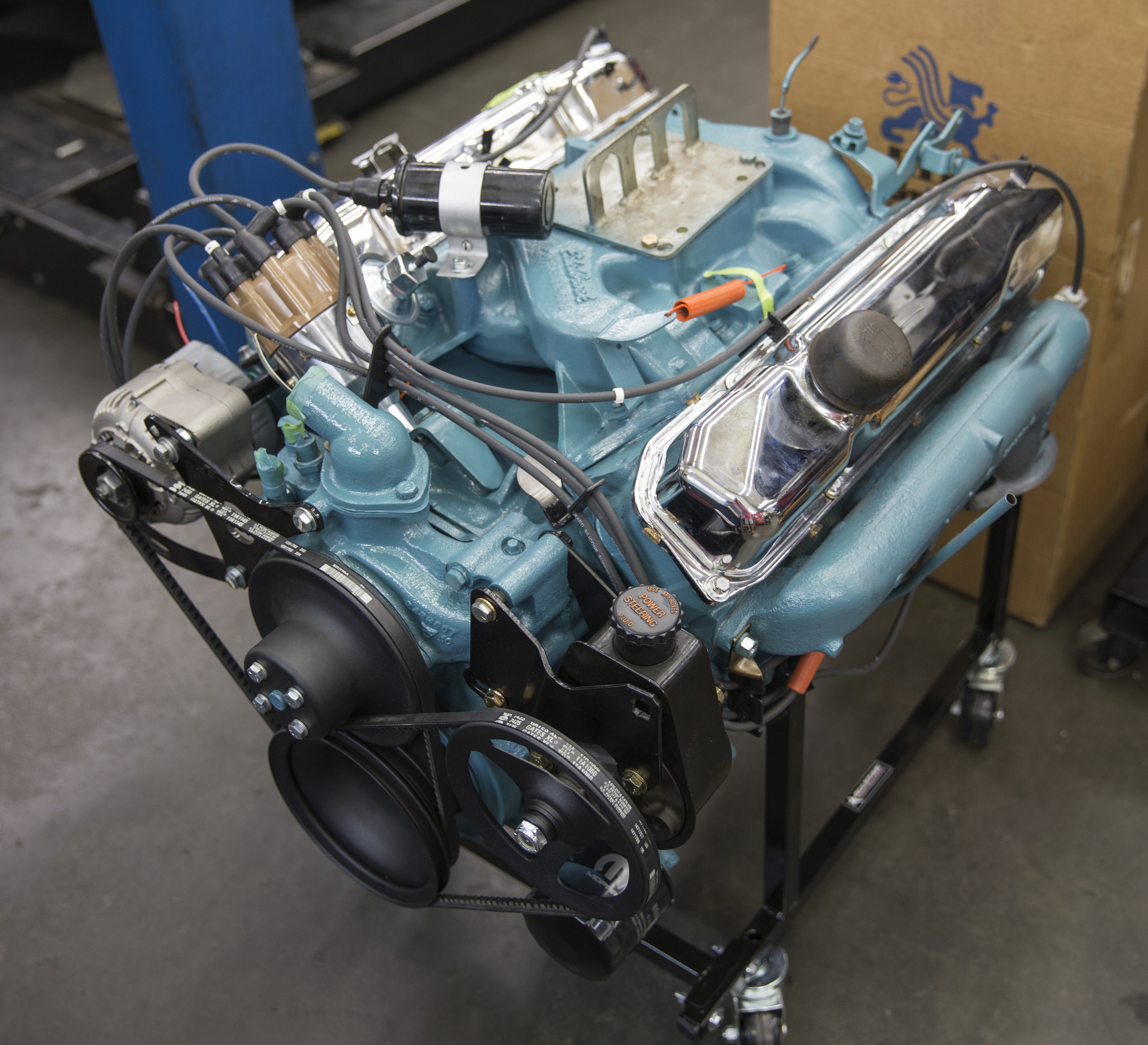
1964 or 1965 Chrysler 383 B engine

The 383 cu in B engine—not to be confused with the RB version—was essentially a larger bore version of the 350 and 361, using a 4.25 in (108.0 mm) bore for a 383.03 cu in (6,277 cc) displacement. This engine was introduced in 1959. Dodge's version, the D500, had a cross-ram induction manifold and dual four-barrel carburetors as options. In some Dodge applications, this engine was labeled as the Magnum, while the Plymouth version was called the Golden Commando. Both came with a dual point distributor in high-performance versions.

The 383 became the standard model Mopar performance engine for the next decade. The big bore allowed for larger, 2.08 in (53 mm), intake valves, and the relatively short stroke helped it to be a free-revving and free-breathing engine.

Producing a maximum of 330 hp (246 kW; 335 PS) (gross) and 460 lb⋅ft (624 N⋅m) of torque for the 1960 model year, the 383 beat the 392 Hemi that had reached 435 lb⋅ft (590 N⋅m). The 1960 383 engines featured the same basic ram induction system as the Chrysler 300F's 413 RB engines (named Sonoramic Commando when sold in Plymouth form). The later 383 Magnum (starting in 1968) used the 440 Magnum heads, camshaft, and exhaust manifolds. This engine was advertised at 335 hp (250 kW; 340 PS).

Vehicles using the B 383
- 1962–1965 Chrysler 300 base models
- 1961–1971 Chrysler Newport
- 1959–1971 Chrysler Town and Country
- 1962–1971 Plymouth Sport Fury
- 1966 Chrysler R/T police special in Canada
- 1959–1960 DeSoto
- 1965–1971 Dodge Monaco
- 1965–1971 Dodge Coronet
- 1967–1971 Dodge Charger
- 1970–1971 Dodge Challenger
- 1963–1965 Dodge Custom 880
- 1967–1969 Dodge Dart
- 1960–1971 Dodge Polara
- 1968–1971 Dodge Super Bee
- 1967–1971 Plymouth Barracuda
- 1960–1971 Plymouth Savoy
- 1960-1971 Plymouth Belvedere
- 1960–1971 Plymouth Fury
- 1968–1971 Plymouth Road Runner
- 1965–1971 Plymouth Satellite
- Bristol 411
- Facel Vega HK500
- 1961–1964 Facel Vega Excellence (EX2)
- Facel Vega Facel II
- Jensen CV8
- Jensen Interceptor MKI and II
- Jensen FF

=== 400 ===
The 400 cu in (6.6 L) B engine was introduced in 1972 to replace the venerable 383, and were power-rated via the net (installed) method. Chrysler increased the bore size of the 383 to create the 400. Its bore of 4.342-inch (110.3 mm) was the largest used in any production Chrysler V8 at the date of its introduction. All parts except for the pistons were interchangeable between the 383 and 400.

Crankshafts were made of cast iron. Three versions of this engine were available: a two-barrel/single-exhaust version producing 170 hp (127 kW; 172 PS) at 4,400 rpm and 305 lb⋅ft (414 N⋅m) of torque at 2,400 rpm, a four-barrel/single-exhaust version producing 205 hp (153 kW; 208 PS) at 4,400 rpm, and a high-performance four-barrel/dual-exhaust version rated at 260 hp (194 kW; 264 PS) at 4,800 rpm and 410 lb⋅ft (556 N⋅m) of torque at 3,200 rpm. All three versions used the same 8.2:1 compression ratio. The 400 was used in car, truck, and motorhome chassis. Horsepower and torque ratings gradually declined through the years because of the addition of more federally mandated emissions controls, until all Chrysler passenger vehicle big-block production ceased in 1978. For its last year of production, it only produced 190 hp (142 kW) (although a heavy-duty version was also available).

Due to its large factory bore size, short (compared to RB engines) deck height, and bottom end strength that is greater than any other production B or RB engine due to extra material added around the main bearing caps, 400 B engine blocks have become a popular choice for high-performance engine build-ups.

== RB engines ==
The RB engines, produced from 1959 to 1979, are raised-block (taller) versions of the B engines. All RB engines have a 3 3/4 in (95.3 mm) stroke, with the bore being the defining factor in engine size. All RB wedge engines share a deck height of 10.725 in (272.4 mm), and were fitted with 6.768 in (171.9 mm) long connecting rods, resulting in a 1.80:1 rod ratio. Bore center distance is 4.8 in (120 mm). All RBs are oversquare.

=== 383 ===
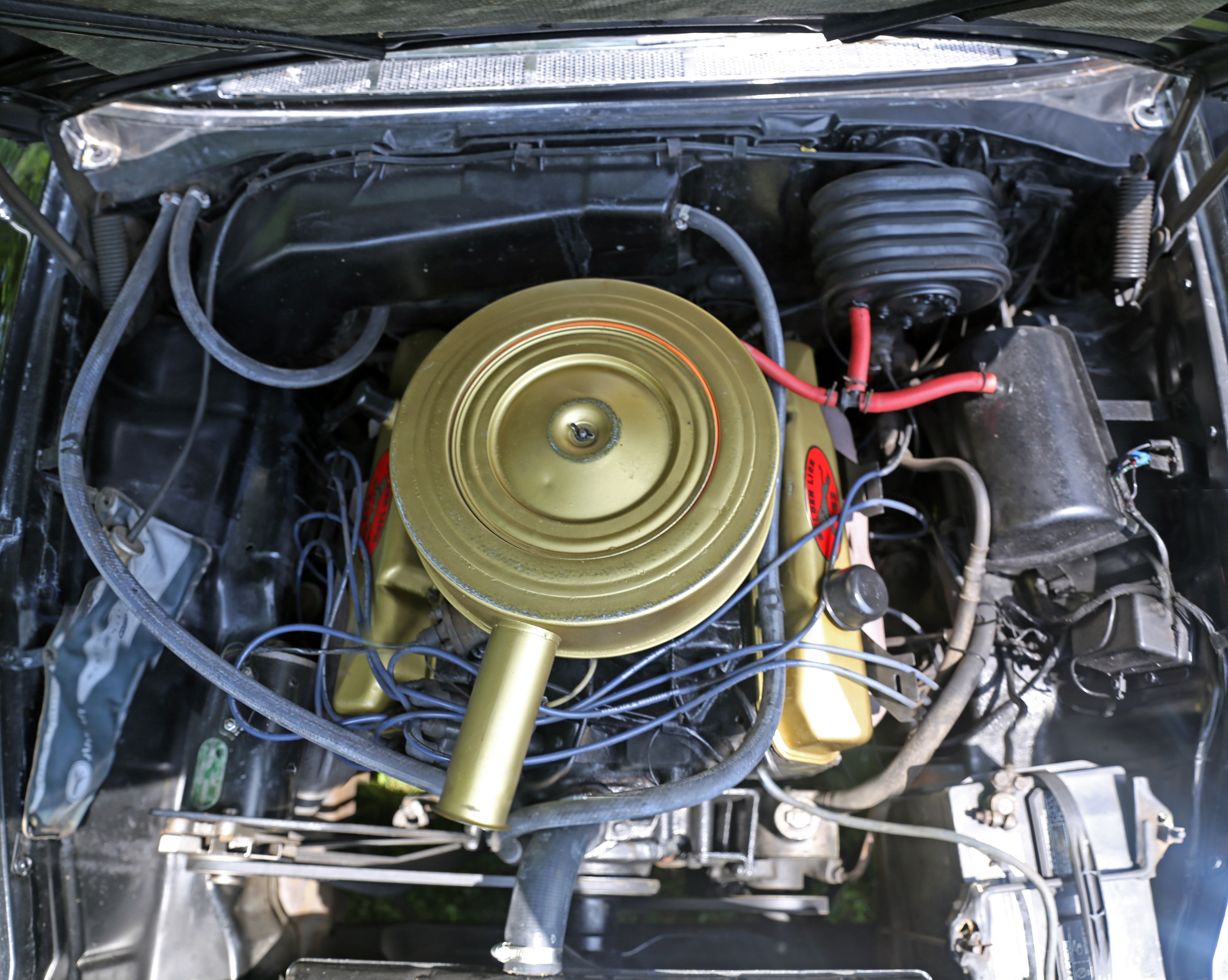
RB 383 "Golden Lion" engine in a 1959 Windsor

Not to be confused with the 383 B engine, the 383 RB had a 4 1/32 in (102.4 mm; 4.031 in) bore combined with the long stroke of 3 3/4-inch (95.3 mm), for a displacement of 382.9 cu in (6,275 cc). It was only available in 1959 and 1960 on the U.S.-built Chrysler Windsors and Saratogas; one of Trenton Engine's lines had been converted to the new RB engine (to make the 413), and demand for the 383 B engine was too high for the remaining line. The solution was to create a 383 RB to fill the gap until the plant figured out how to quickly switch from one block to the other.

=== 413 ===
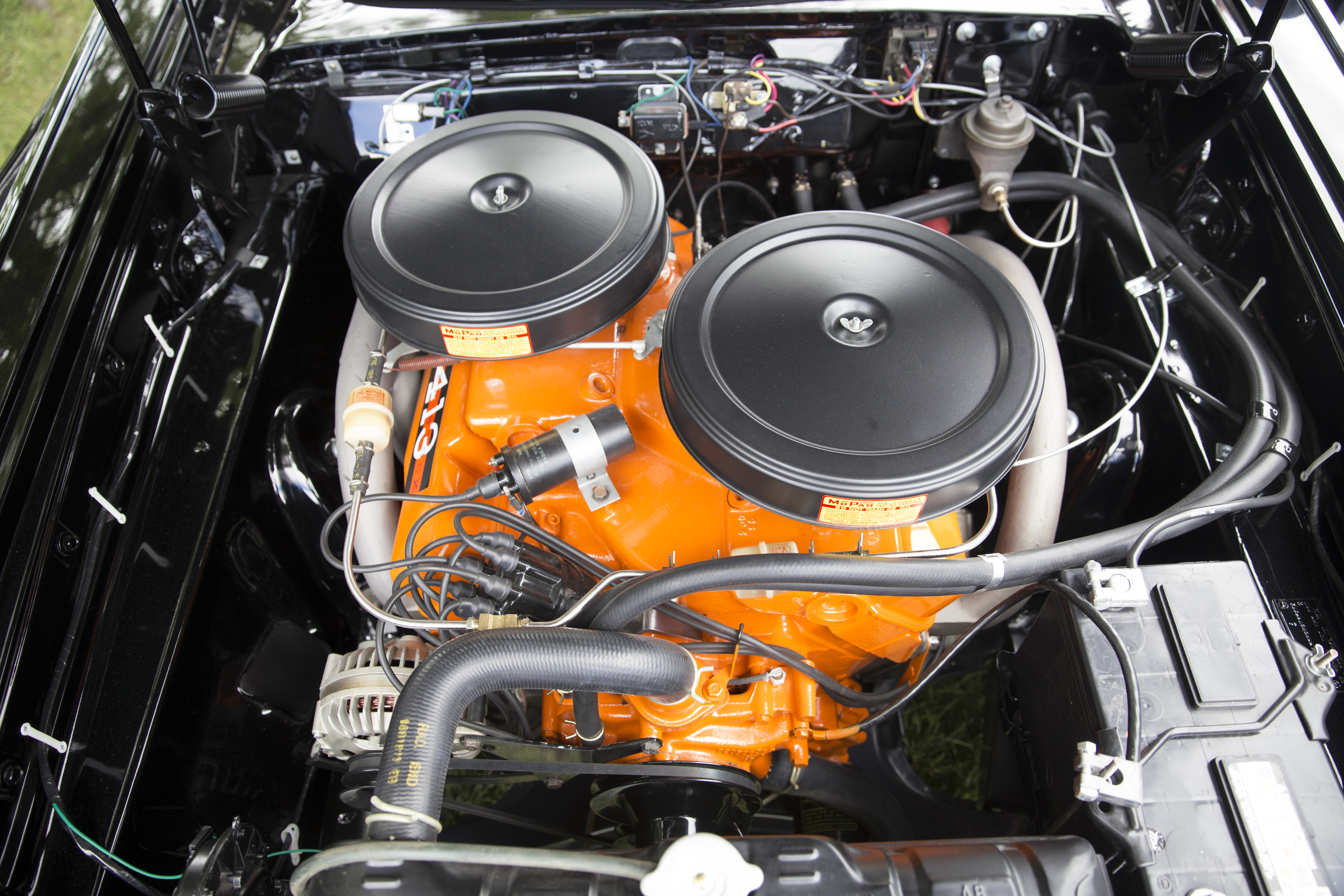
RB 413 Super Stock "Max Wedge" engine

The 413 cu in (6.8 L) RB was used from 1959 to 1965 in cars. It was also used in medium and heavy trucks including truck-tractors such as the C-1000, up until 1979. It has a bore of 4.1875 inches. During that period, it powered almost all Chrysler New Yorker and all Imperial models, and was also available on the lesser Chryslers, Dodge Polara, Dodge Monaco, and Plymouth Fury as an alternative to the B-block 383 and the A-block 318. It was also fitted to some European cars such as the later Facel Vega Facel II.

In the 1959 Chrysler 300E, the 413 wedge was fitted with inline dual four-barrel carburetors; it was factory-rated at 380 bhp (283 kW) at 5,000 rpm and 525 lb⋅ft (712 N⋅m) at 3,600 rpm. In 1960, a long-tube ram induction system was made standard on the Chrysler 300. It continued as standard on the 1961 300-G, and remained on the option sheets for Chrysler 300s through 1964. In 1962, a special version known as the "Max Wedge" was made available for drag racing and street use; this version produced 420 bhp (313 kW) at 5,000 rpm.

Engine specifications
| Model years | Fuel system | Power | Torque | Compression ratio |
|---|---|---|---|---|
| 1959–1961 | 4-barrel carburetor | 340 hp (254 kW) at 4600 rpm | 480 lb⋅ft (651 N⋅m) at 2800 rpm | 10.0:1 |
| 1959 | 2 × 4-barrel carbs | 380 hp (283 kW) at 5000 rpm | 525 lb⋅ft (712 N⋅m) at 3600 rpm | 10.0:1 |
| 1960–1961 | 2 × 4-barrel carbs | 375 hp (280 kW) at 5000 rpm | 525 lb⋅ft (712 N⋅m) at 2800 rpm | 10.0:1 |
| 1962 | 4-barrel carb | 340 hp (254 kW) at 4600 rpm | 480 lb⋅ft (651 N⋅m) at 2800 rpm | 10.1:1 |
| 1962 | 2 × 4-barrel carbs | 380 hp (283 kW) at 5000 rpm | 525 lb⋅ft (712 N⋅m) at 2800 rpm | 10.1:1 |
| 1963-1965 | 4-barrel carb | 360 hp (268 kW) at 4600 rpm | 495 lb⋅ft (671 N⋅m) at 2800 rpm | 10.1:1 |
| 1963-1964 | 2 × 4-barrel carbs | 390 hp (291 kW) at 4800 rpm | 530 lb⋅ft (719 N⋅m) at 3600 rpm | 10.1:1 |

=== 426 Wedge ===
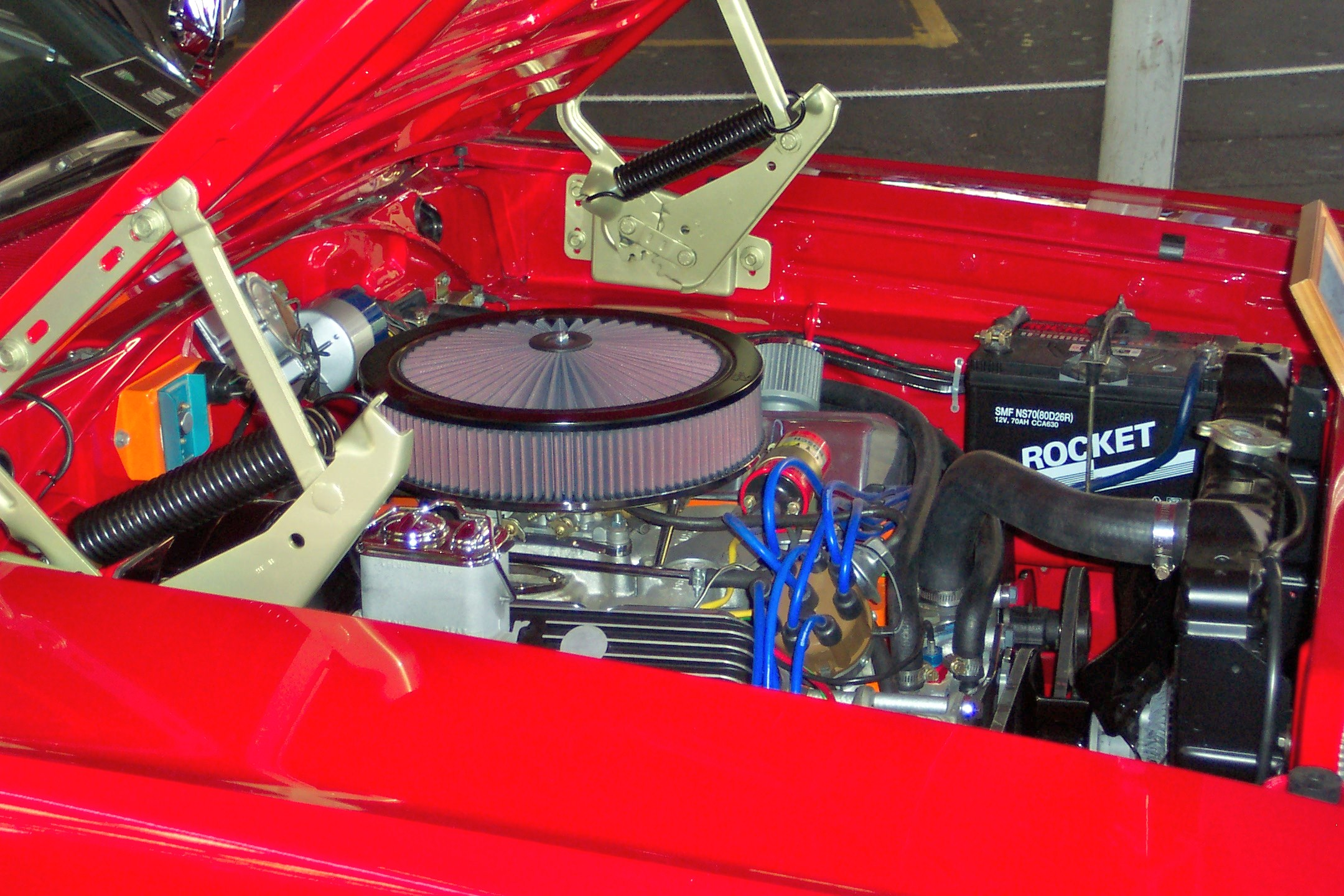
1966 Dodge Charger engine bay

Not to be confused with the 426 Hemi, the 426 cu in (7.0 L) RB was a wedge-head RB block with a 4.25 in (108 mm) bore. The 426 Wedge served as Chrysler's main performance engine until the introduction of the 426 Hemi. It was initially offered as the "non-catalogued" option S42 in Chryslers (the number of such produced is uncertain), offered with 373 or 385 hp (278 or 287 kW) via a single 4-barrel carburetor (11.0:1 or 12.0:1 compression ratio, respectively), or 413 or 421 hp (308 or 314 kW) via ram-inducted dual four-barrel carburetors (with the same compression ratios). For 1963, horsepower ratings would slightly increase (see below), and it became optional in B-bodied Dodges and Plymouths. After 1963, it would be used only in Dodges and Plymouths.

The Max Wedge was a race-only version of the 426 Wedge engine offered from the factory. Known as the Super Stock Plymouth and Ramcharger Dodge, the Max Wedge featured high-flow cylinder heads developed through then state-of-the-art airflow testing. It had 1 7/8 in (48 mm) exhaust valves, which required the cylinder bores to be notched for clearance. The blocks were a special severe-duty casting with larger oil-feed passages than other RB engines, and were stress-relieved by the factory. Induction came by means of a cross-ram intake manifold tuned for peak power above 4000 rpm and two Carter AFB-3447SA 4-barrel carburetors. The Max Wedge also included high-flow cast-iron exhaust manifolds that, on the later versions, resembled steel tube headers. The Max Wedge was factory rated at 415 or 425 bhp (309 or 317 kW) (depending on compression), and 480 lb⋅ft (651 N⋅m) at 4400 rpm.

Before the end of the 1963 model year, Chrysler introduced the Stage II Max Wedge with improved combustion chamber design and an improved camshaft. The last performance year for the Max Wedge was the 1964 Stage III. The factory-advertised power rating never changed despite the Stage II and III improvements.

A 426 Street Wedge engine was also available in 1964 and 1965. An increased-bore version of the standard New Yorker 413 single 4-barrel engine, it bears little relation to the Max Wedge except for basic architecture and dimensions. It was available only in B-body cars (Plymouth and Dodge) and light-duty Dodge D Series trucks.

=== 440 Magnum ===
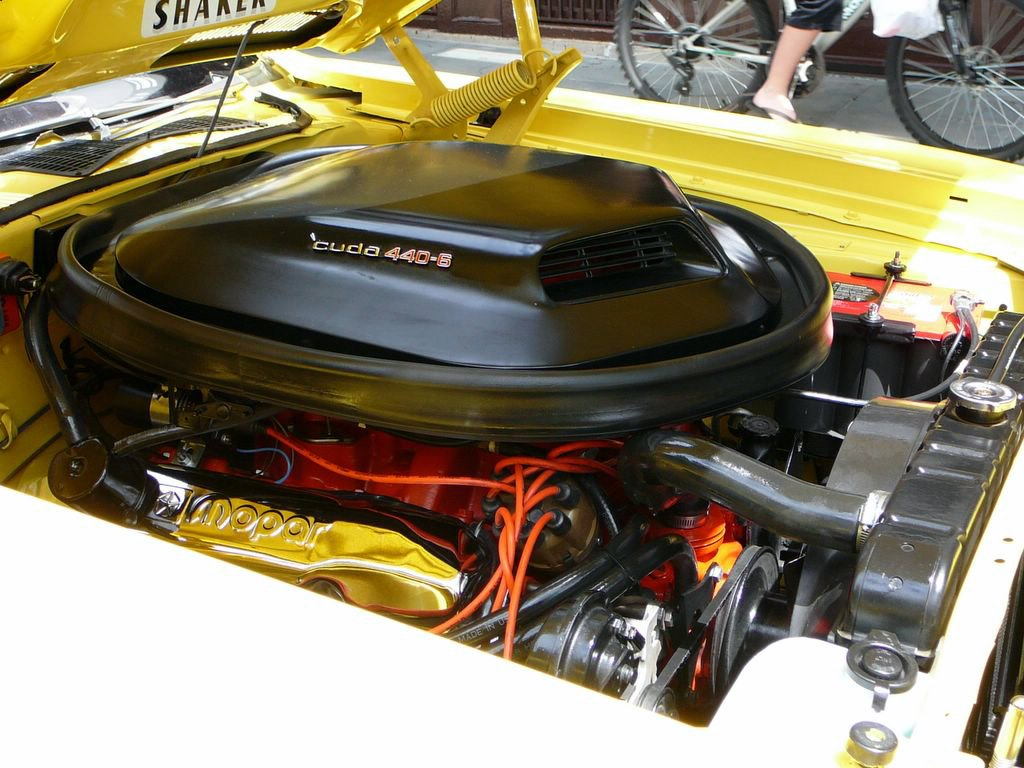
440 6-Barrel RB V8 in a 1971 Plymouth Barracuda

The 440 cu in (7.2 L) RB was produced from 1965 until 1978, making it the last version of the Chrysler RB block. It had a light wall construction, precision cast-iron block, with iron heads and a bore of 4.32 in (109.7 mm), for an overall displacement of 440 cu in (7.2 L).

From 1967 to 1971, the high-performance version was rated at 375 bhp (380 PS; 280 kW) (370 bhp (375 PS; 276 kW) in 1971) at 4,600 rpm and 480 lb⋅ft (651 N⋅m) at 3,200 rpm of torque with a single 4-barrel carburetor, and from 1969 to 1971, the highest-output version had an intake setup with 3×2-barrel Holley carburetors ("440 Six Pack" for Dodge, "440 6-BBL" for Plymouth) producing 390 bhp (395 PS; 291 kW) at 4,700 rpm (385 bhp (390 PS; 287 kW) in 1971) and 490 lb⋅ft (664 N⋅m) at 3,200 rpm of torque.

In 1972, changes were made to the horsepower ratings of vehicle engines from gross (engine only, without air cleaner, stock exhaust system, alternator, water pump or other power-consuming components) to net (with alternator, flex plate, air cleaner, water pump, mufflers, and other vehicle equipment installed). The new rating system produced lower, more realistic numbers for any given engine. At the same time, emissions regulations were requiring cleaner exhaust. Engines including the 440 were made with reduced compression, modified cam timing, and other tuning measures to comply with the newly tightened emissions regulations. The 1972 440 produced 335 bhp (250 kW) (gross) at 4400 rpm; the new net rating was 225 hp (168 kW)—which very closely coincided with period German DIN ratings and TÜV measurements.

The high-output 440 (4-barrel/mild cam/dual exhausts) was marketed as the Magnum in Dodges, the Super Commando in Plymouths, and the TNT in Chryslers. From 1972 to 1974, the engine (detuned to run on unleaded gasoline) was rated at 280 hp (209 kW) net, and dropped in horsepower each year until 1978, when it was rated at 255 hp (190 kW) (in police specification) and limited to the large B-body cars including the Chrysler New Yorker, Chrysler Newport, Dodge Monaco Police Pursuit, and Plymouth Fury Police Pursuit. It was also available in marine and heavy-duty commercial applications until that year.

Vehicles using the RB 440
- Chrysler 300 letter series
- Chrysler 300 non-letter series
- Chrysler New Yorker
- Chrysler Newport
- Chrysler Town and Country
- Dodge B-series vans
- Dodge D/W series
- Dodge Coronet
- Dodge Charger
- 1970–1971 Dodge Challenger
- 1969 Dodge Dart
- Dodge Charger Daytona
- Dodge M-Series Chassis
- Dodge Monaco
- Dodge Polara
- Dodge Ramcharger
- 1974–1978 Plymouth Trail Duster
- 1969–1971 Dodge Super Bee
- Imperial
- 1969–1971 Plymouth Barracuda
- Plymouth Belvedere
- Plymouth Fury
- Plymouth GTX
- Plymouth Road Runner
- Plymouth Superbird
- Plymouth VIP
- Jensen Interceptor
- Monteverdi Safari
- 1968–197? Cadillac Gage V-200 Commando (waterproof, export Singapore Armed Forces)

== Crate engines ==
Chrysler also offers complete new 'crate' engines through its Mopar parts division in various displacements. These engines are built from entirely new parts.

== See also ==
- Chrysler ball-stud hemi
- Chrysler engines
