= Plymouth Road Runner =

Muscle car marketed by Plymouth

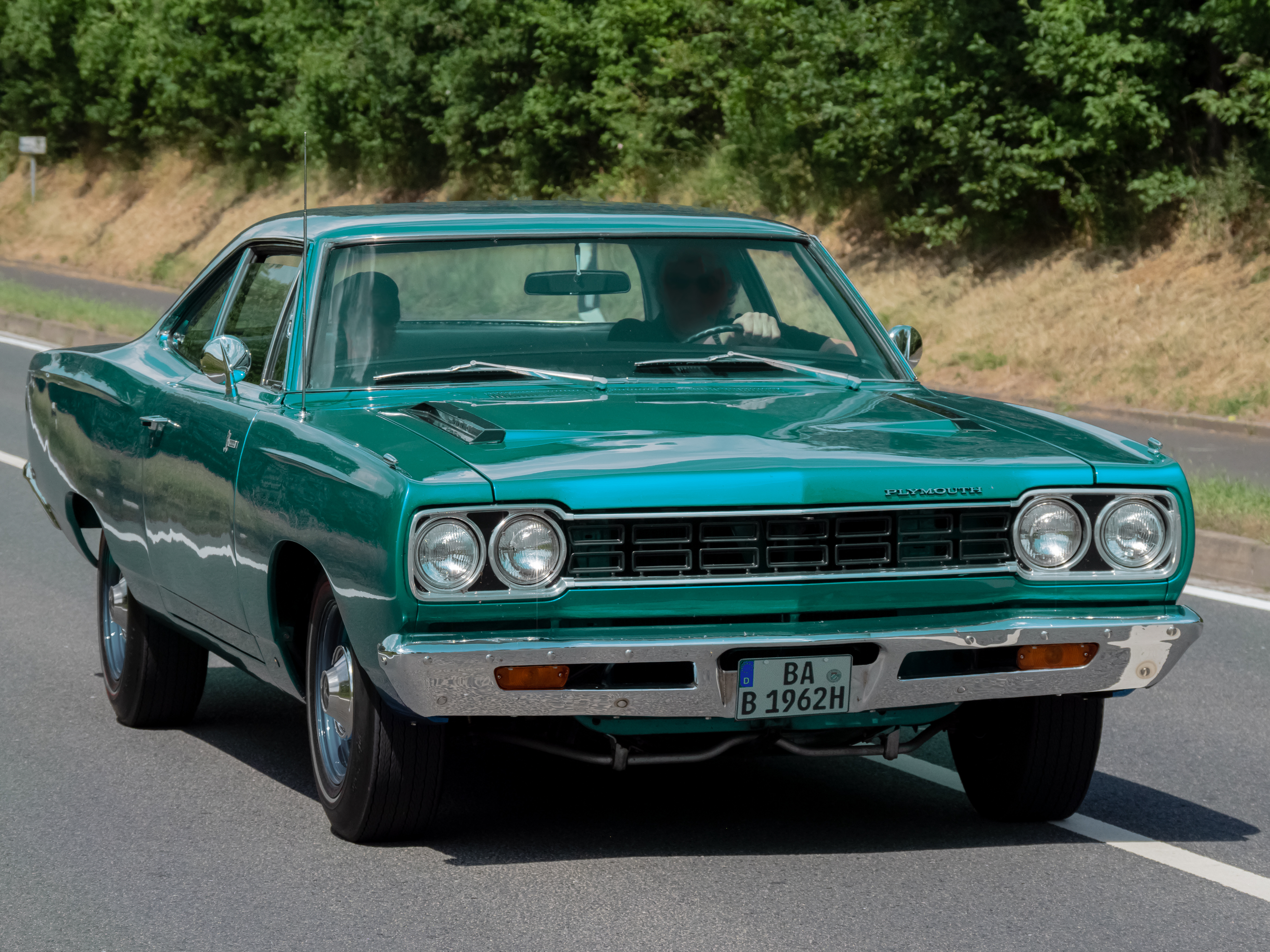

Overview
- Manufacturer: Plymouth (Chrysler)
- Production: 1968–1980
- Assembly: United States: Detroit, Michigan (Lynch Road Assembly); United States: St. Louis, Missouri (Saint Louis Assembly)

Body and chassis
- Class: Mid-size (1968–1975); Compact (1976–1980)
- Layout: FR layout
- Related: Plymouth Belvedere; Dodge Super Bee; Plymouth Satellite; Plymouth GTX

The Plymouth Road Runner is a muscle car introduced by Chrysler in the United States for the 1968 model year and marketed under its Plymouth brand. Initially based on the Belvedere, the brand's basic mid-size model, the Road Runner combined a powerful engine with a spartan trim level and a price that undercut increasingly upscale and expensive muscle cars such as the Pontiac GTO and Plymouth's own GTX. It was initially a sales success.

The Road Runner was built in three generations on the mid-size B platform. Like most muscle cars, its performance and sales declined in the 1970s due to an increasing focus on fuel economy and the adoption of more stringent U.S. emission standards. The nameplate became a trim package for the compact Plymouth Volaré for model year 1976—no longer offering any special performance capability—and was discontinued in 1980.

== Origin ==
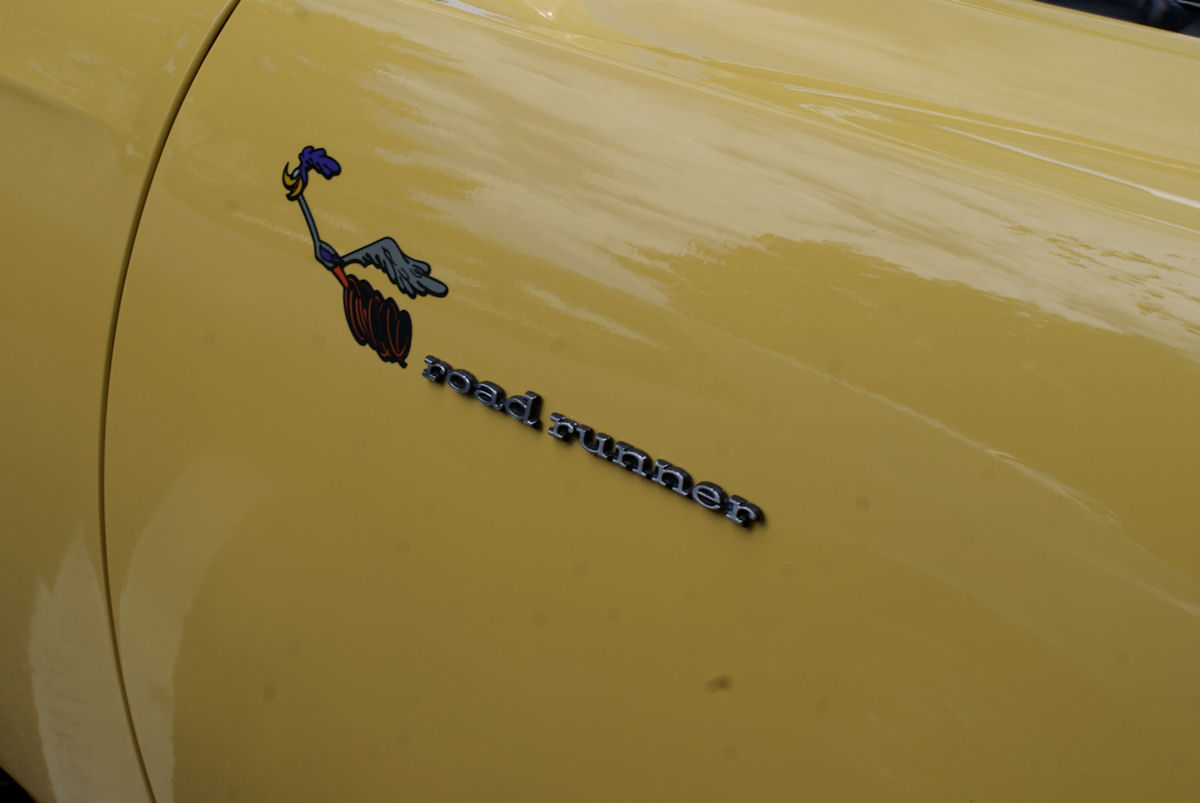
Plymouth licensed the Road Runner name, likeness, and "beep beep" sound from the popular Warner Brothers cartoons.

Plymouth paid $50,000 to Warner Bros.-Seven Arts to use the Road Runner name and likeness from their Wile E. Coyote and the Road Runner cartoons (as well as a "beep, beep" horn, which Plymouth paid $10,000 to develop). The Road Runner was based on the Chrysler B platform (the same as the Belvedere and Satellite), as a back-to-basics mid-size performance car.

== First generation (1968–1970) ==
First generation
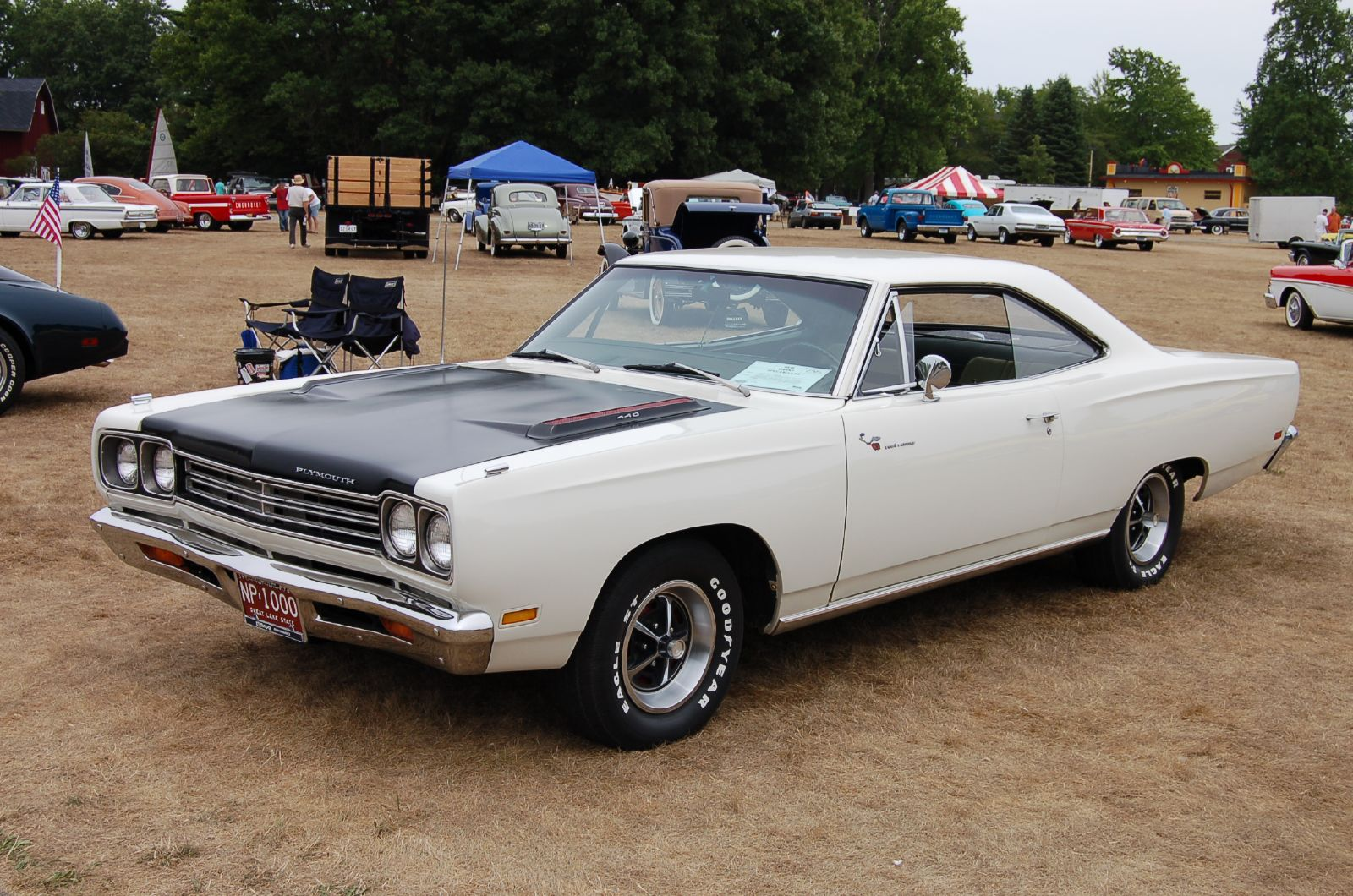
- 1969 Plymouth Road Runner hardtop

Overview
- Production: 1968–1970
- Designer: Jack Smith, Dick MacAdam

Body and chassis
- Body style: 2-door coupe 2-door hardtop 2-door convertible
- Platform: B-body

Powertrain
- Engine: 383 cu in (6.3 L) 335 hp (250 kW) V8; 426 cu in (7.0 L) Hemi V8; 440 cu in (7.2 L) V8
- Transmission: 3-speed automatic 4-speed manual

Dimensions
- Wheelbase: 116.0 in (2,946 mm)
- Length: 202.7 in (5,149 mm)
- Width: 76.4 in (1,941 mm)
- Height: 54.7 in (1,389 mm) (loaded with 5 passengers)

=== 1968 ===
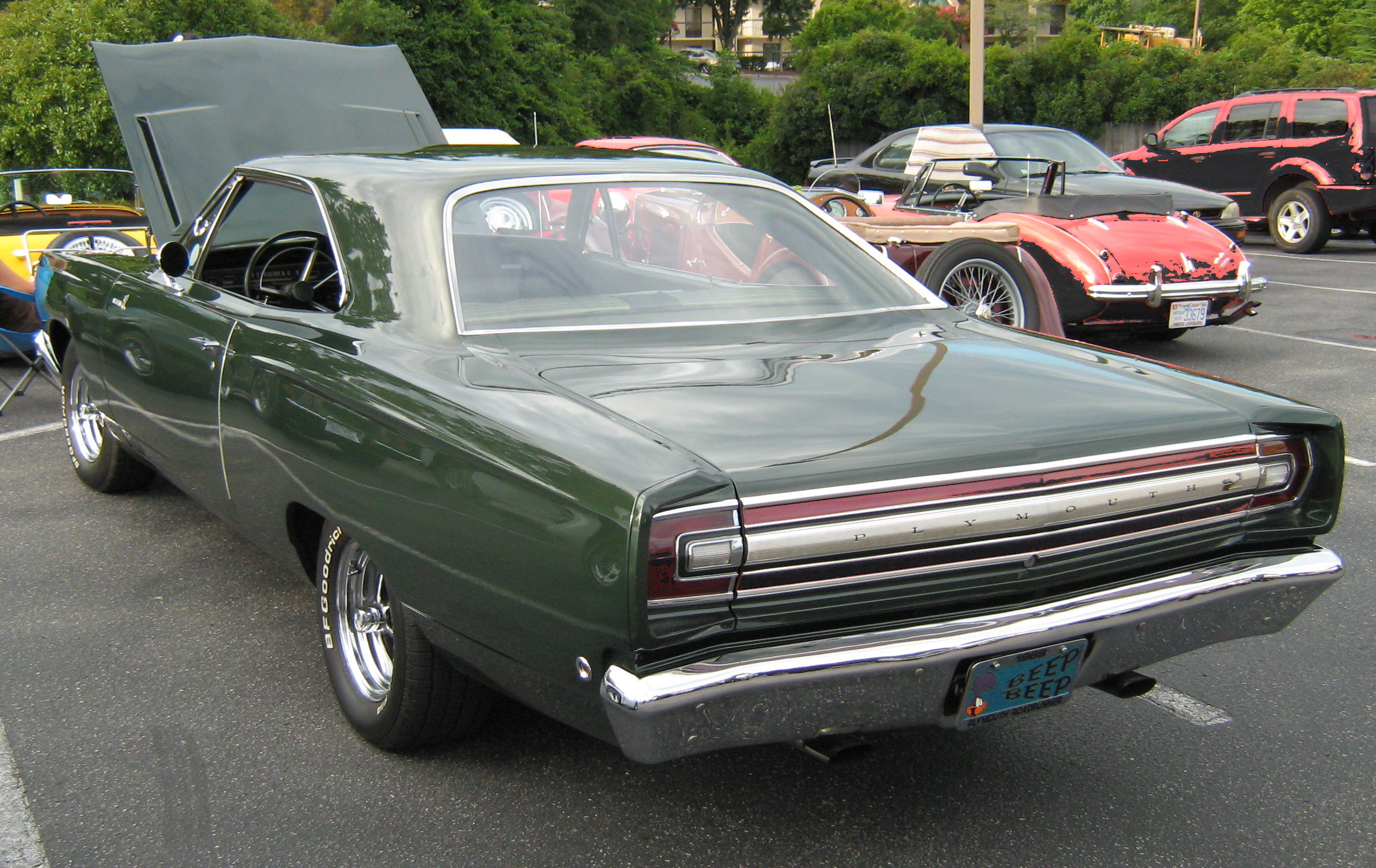
1968 Road Runner rear view

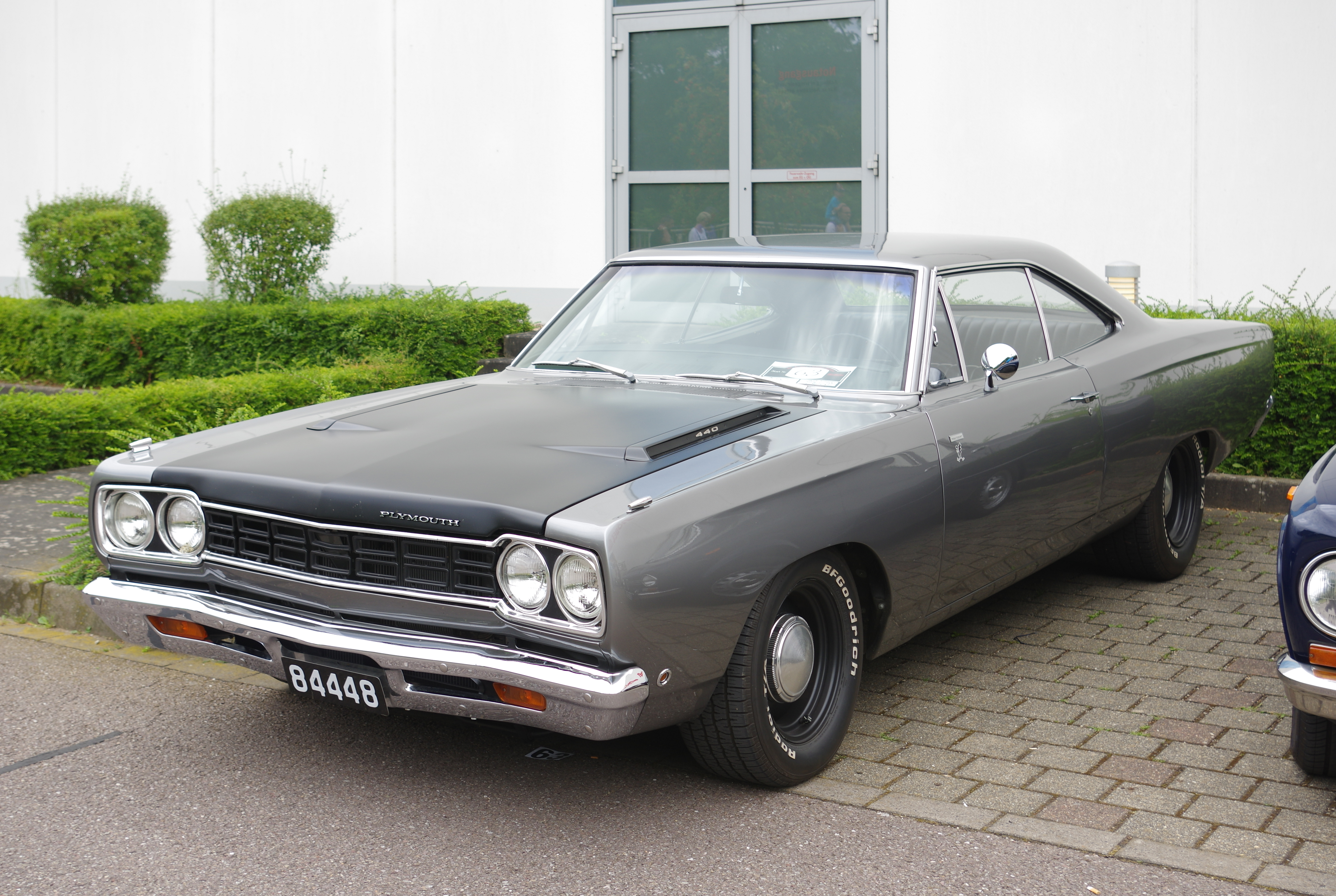
1968 Plymouth Road Runner

The earliest of the 1968 models were available only as 2-door pillared coupes (with a B-pillar or "post" between the front and rear windows), but later in the model year, a 2-door "hardtop" model (sans pillar) was offered. The Road Runner of 1968-1970 was based on the Belvedere, while the GTX was based on the Sport Satellite, a car with higher-level trim and slight differences in the grilles and taillights.

The interior was spartan with a basic vinyl bench seat, lacking even carpets in early models, and few options were available — such as power steering and front disc brakes, AM radio, air conditioning (except with the 426 Hemi) and automatic transmission. A floor-mounted shifter (for the four-speed) featured only a rubber boot and no console so that a bench seat could be used.

The standard engine was an exclusive "Roadrunner" 383 cu in (6.3 L) B-series V8 engine with a 4-barrel Carter Carburetor rated at 335 bhp (340 PS; 250 kW) at 5200 rpm and 425 lb⋅ft (576 N⋅m) at 3400 rpm of torque. Its extra 5 hp (4 kW) rating was the result of using the radical cam from the 440 Super Commando and a .25 raise in compression to 10.5:1 (vs. 10.25:1 with the 330 hp (246 kW) 383). When air conditioning was ordered, the cars received the 330 hp (246 kW) version, as the radical cam specs of the 335 bhp (250 kW) version did not create enough vacuum to accommodate air conditioning. A $714 option was the 426 cu in (7.0 L) Hemi with 2X4 Carter AFB carburetors rated at 425 bhp (431 PS; 317 kW) at 5000 rpm and 490 lb⋅ft (664 N⋅m) at 4000 rpm of torque.

The standard equipment transmission was a 4-speed manual transmission with floor shifter, and the three-speed TorqueFlite automatic transmission was optional. Early four-speed 1968 Road Runners featured Inland shifters, which were replaced by Hurst shifters during the course of the model year.

Plymouth expected to sell about 20,000 units in 1968; actual sales numbered around 45,000. This placed the Road Runner third in sales among muscle cars, with only the Pontiac GTO and Chevy's SS-396 Chevelle outselling it. Dodge debuted the Road Runner's cousin, the Super Bee, as a mid-1968 offering after seeing Plymouth's success with the Road Runner.

=== 1969 ===
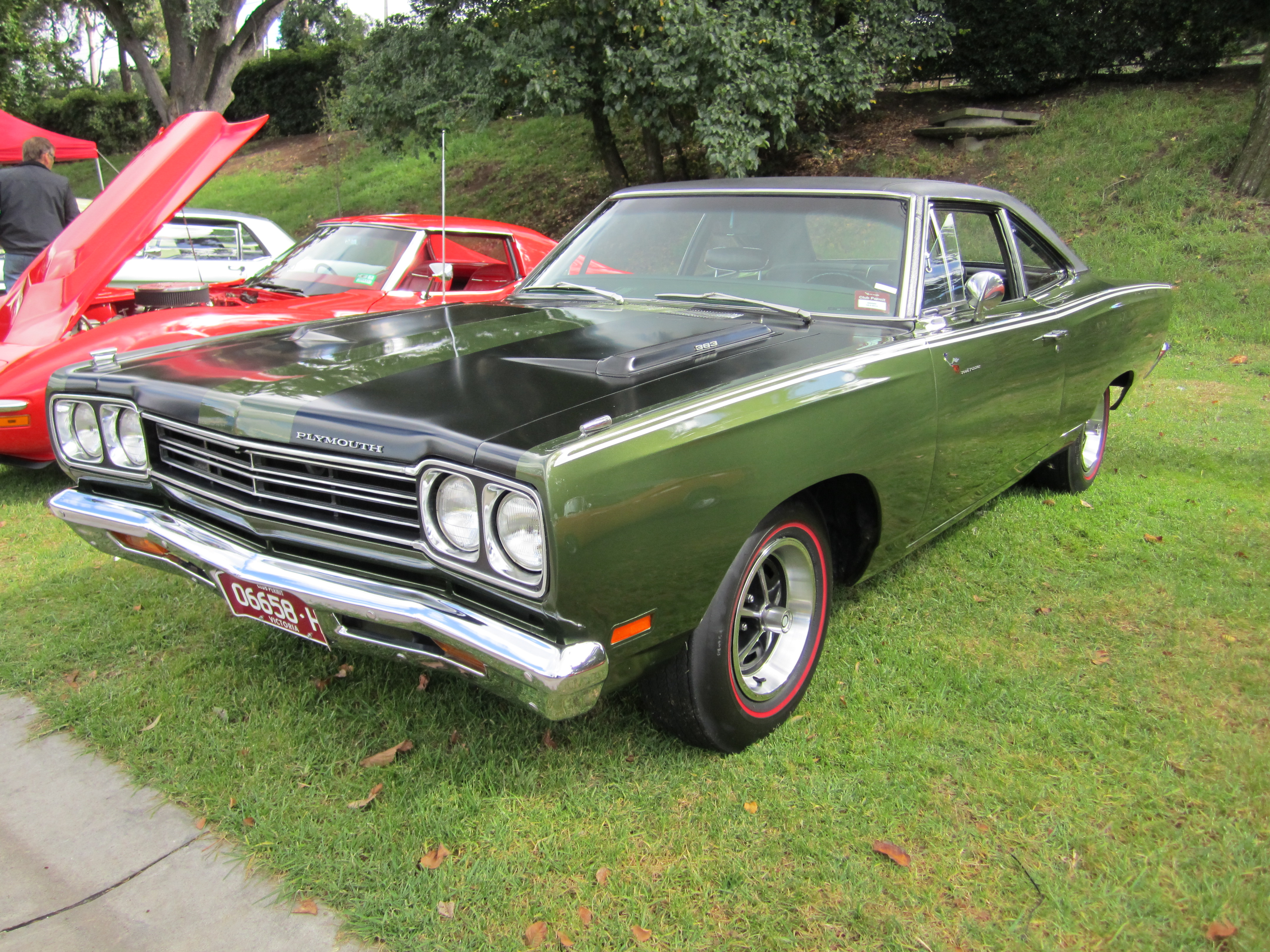
1969 Plymouth Road Runner 383

The 1969 model kept the same basic look, but with slight changes to the taillights and grille, side marker lights, optional bucket seats, and new Road Runner decals. The Road Runner added a convertible option for 1969, with 2,128 such models produced that year. All were 383 cu in (6.3 L) engine cars, except for ten which were equipped with a 426 cu in (7.0 L) Hemi.

An Air Grabber option (N96 code) was introduced this year; it consisted of a fiberglass air duct assembly bolted to the underside of the hood that connected to twin rectangular upward-facing vents in the hood with Rallye red vent screens. The fiberglass hood box had an "Air Grabber" sticker on the front. When the hood was closed, a rubber seal fit over the large, oval unsilenced air cleaner. A decal with Wile E. Coyote saying "Coyote Duster" was on the air cleaner lid. The assembly ducted air directly into the engine. The vents in the hood could be opened and closed via a lever under the dashboard labeled "Carb Air."

The (A12) 440 engine option with 3X2 barrel Holley carburetors was added to the lineup at mid-year. The "440 Six BBL" had no wheel covers or hubcaps, only the 15x6" "H" stamped steel black wheels with chrome lug nuts. It featured a black fiberglass lift-off hood with 4 hood pins and a large functional hood scoop with a red sticker on each side saying "440 6BBL". The scoop sealed to the large air breather. All cars had a Dana 60 rear axle with a 4.10 gear ratio. Production of the 440 6-BBL A12 option Road Runner was approximately 1,432. The A12 option had an "M" as the fifth character in the VIN, rated at 390 hp (395 PS; 291 kW) at 4,700 rpm and 490 lb⋅ft (664 N⋅m) of torque at 3200 rpm, the same torque as the Hemi but at a lower engine speed. The Plymouth Road Runner was named Motor Trend Car of the Year for 1969. Domestic production for the three body styles was 81,125 with an additional 3,295 deliveries in Canada and other countries.

=== 1970 ===
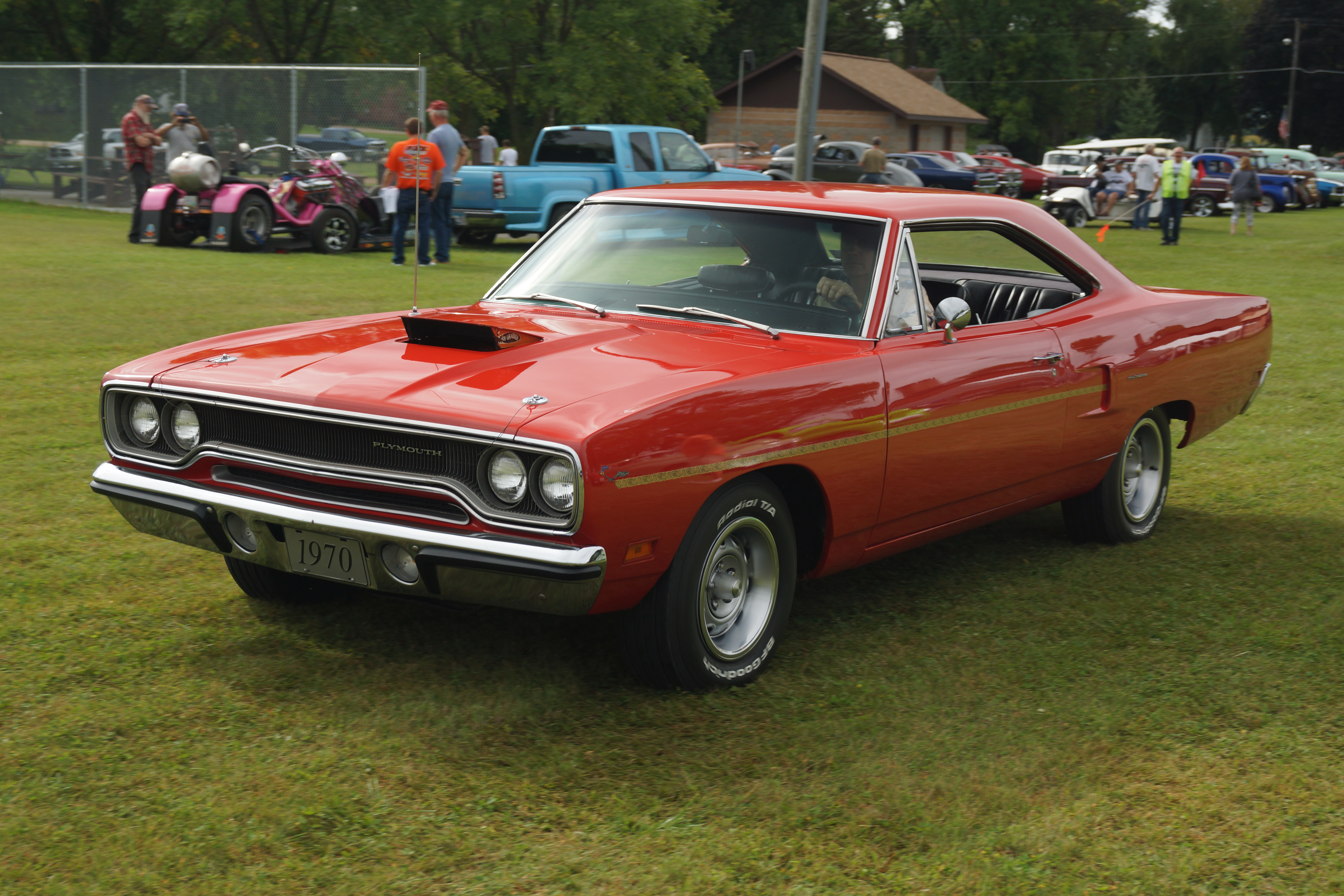
1970 Plymouth Road Runner

The 1970 model year brought new front, and rear end looks to the basic 1968 body, and it would prove to be another success. Updates included a new grille, cloth & vinyl bench seat, hood, front fenders, quarter panels, single-piston Kelsey-Hayes disc brakes (improved from the rather small-rotor Bendix 4-piston calipers of '68 - '69), and even non-functional scoops in the rear quarters. The design and functionality of the Air Grabber option was changed. A switch below the dash actuated a vacuum servo to slowly raise the forward-facing scoop, exposing shark teeth decals on either side. "High Impact" colors, with names like In-Violet, Moulin Rouge, and Vitamin C, were available for that year. Although a heavy-duty three-speed manual became the standard transmission, the engine lineup was left unchanged, relegating the four-speed to the options list along with the TorqueFlite automatic. This was the second and last year of the Road Runner convertible, with only 834 made. The new high-back bucket seats were shared with other Chrysler products, which featured built-in headrests.

The 440 Six Barrel remained an option for 1970. A factory-produced cast iron piece replaced the 1969 "M" Code Edelbrock aluminum intake; however, some early cars built before January 1, 1970, were equipped with the left over aluminum Edelbrock intake from the year prior.

Sales of the 1970 Road Runner dropped by more than 50 percent over the previous year to around 41,000 units (about 1,000 ahead of Pontiac's GTO but still about 13,000 units behind Chevy's Chevelle SS-396/454). This would also be the last year of the Road Runner convertible with 834 total productions. Only 3 Hemi (R) code Road Runner convertibles were built (plus 1 to Canada). The declining sales of Road Runner and other muscle cars were the results of a move by insurance companies to add surcharges for muscle car policies - making insurance premiums for high-performance vehicles a costly proposition. Also, Plymouth introduced another bargain-basement muscle car for 1970, the compact Duster 340 which was powered by a 275 hp (205 kW) 340 4-BBL V8 which in the lighter-weight compact A-body could perform as well if not better than a 383 Road Runner. Furthermore, the Duster 340 was priced even lower than the Road Runner, and its smaller engine qualified it for much lower insurance rates.

=== Plymouth Duster I ===
The Plymouth Duster I was a high-performance concept car version of the Road Runner produced in the late 1960s. It featured the usual low-curved racing-type of the windshield and had airplane-type flaps on the top and sides. A set of adjustable spoilers on the rear fender's side (near the gas tank filler cap) helped prevent side-to-side yaw when slipstreaming in a race, with two more of them on top behind the driver, plus spoilers in the front as rock shields to reduce frontal lift. It was powered by a 383 4-BBL V-8. Plymouth never built any for commercial sale. However, a version of Duster was introduced in 1970, with a scaled-down version powertrain, including a 340 ci engine. The Dodge Division produced a sister car, which was the Dodge Demon, and it, too, included a smaller powerful 340 ci V8. However, it was only on the market for two years before a name and body style change.

== 1970 Superbird ==
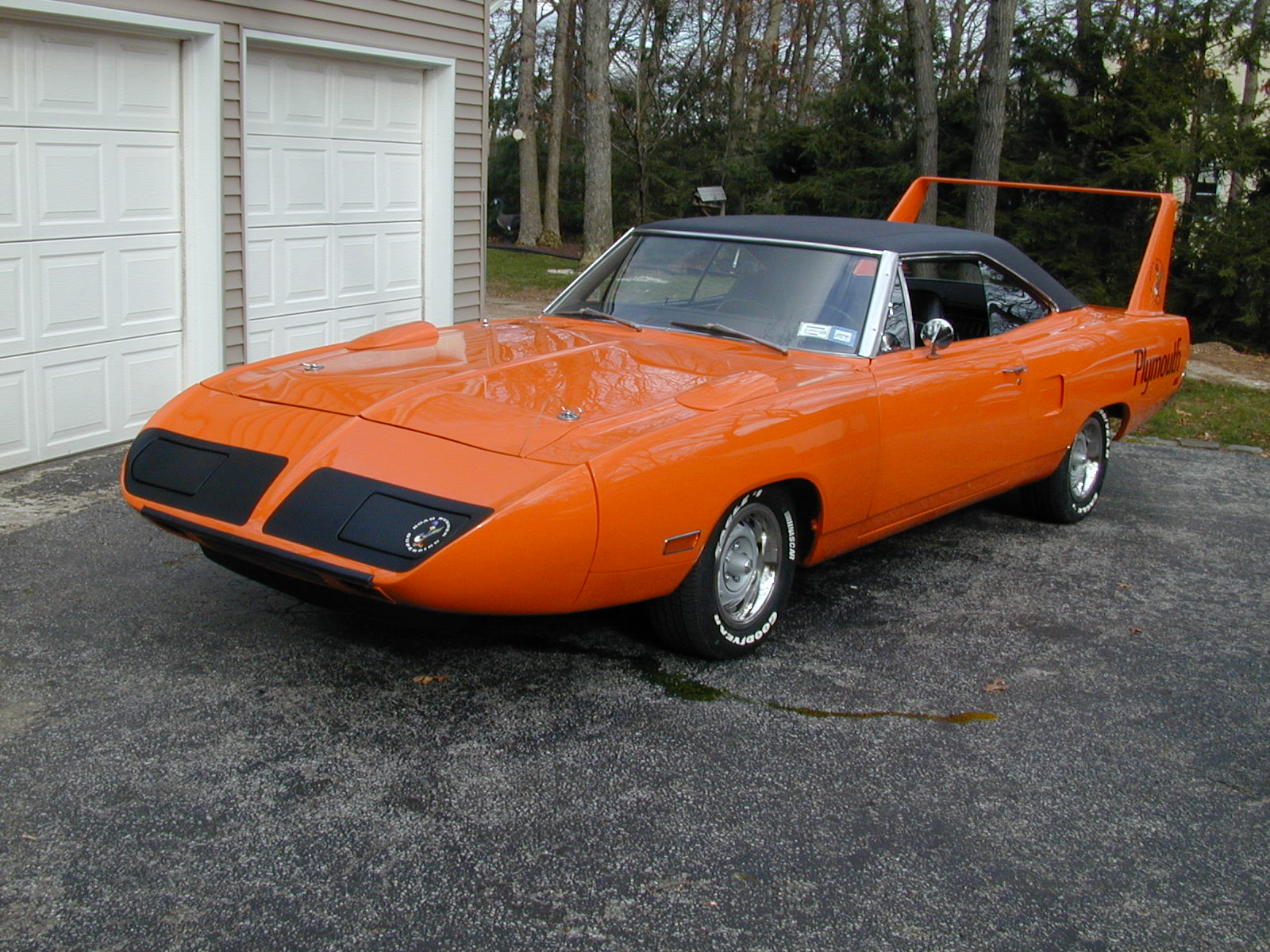
Plymouth Superbird

During the 1969 NASCAR "aero wars," Chrysler first fielded the Dodge Charger 500 that featured aerodynamic improvements to a standard 1969 Charger. Later in the season, Chrysler and Dodge debuted the Dodge Charger Daytona. The Daytona featured an elevated spoiler raised 23 inches off the trunk deck by upright pylons and an aerodynamic nose cone. The Charger 500, especially, and the Daytona to a lesser degree struggled to equal the fastback Ford Torino Talladega and Mercury Cyclone Spoiler II in 1969. Dissatisfied with the 1968 Road Runner, Petty Engineering had asked the Chrysler managers for 1969 Dodge Charger 500s and Charger Daytonas for the 1969 season. The Chrysler managers told the Pettys that they were "a Plymouth team." The Pettys signed with Ford in days, and Richard Petty and Petty Engineering won 10 races in 1969 and finished second in the NASCAR points championship.

To meet NASCAR homologation rules and also to bring Petty Engineering back to Chrysler, it was decided that Plymouth would get its own version of Dodge's winged wonder for the 1970 NASCAR season. While spectacular on the track, consumer response was lukewarm, leading a few dealers to remove the wing and nose, making them appear more like normal Road Runners. Significantly, all public sold Superbirds had vinyl tops, while the Charger Daytonas did not. NASCAR only required 500 copies to be built in 1969, but in 1970, NASCAR required a manufacturer to build one unit per dealer. Production was 1,935 for the US market. Superbirds were available with three different engines. The most popular was the basic Super Commando 440 V8 with a single four-barrel carburetor rated at 375 bhp (280 kW). Next up was the 440 Six Barrel rated at 390 bhp (291 kW). At the top, and ordered by just 135 buyers, was the 426 Hemi, rated at 425 bhp (317 kW); 135 Hemis (58 4-Spd and 77 Automatics), 1,084 - 440 4-BBL Super Commandos (458 4-Spd and 626 Automatics), and 716 - 440 Six Barrels (308 4-Spd and 408 Automatics).

According to Road Test magazine, performance was around 0 to 60 mph (97 km/h) in 5.5 seconds, 1/4 mile in 14.3 seconds at 104 mph with the Hemi. Although similar in appearance, the Superbird was actually quite different from the Daytona. The Superbird was based on the Plymouth Road Runner, and the nose, airfoil, and basic sheet metal were different between the Daytona and Superbird. The Superbird actually used the front fenders and a modified hood from the '70 Dodge Coronet that lent themselves better to the nose design. It was an easy fix since the mounting points for fenders on both cars were identical. The special nose added 19 inches (483 mm) to the overall length (the Daytona's was 18 inches or 457 mm), and the trunk spoiler was more angled and higher than the Daytona's. On both models, the spoiler was two feet high. Although it created quite an impression on the street, the wing was not needed at normal highway speeds; it was designed for speedways to keep the rear wheels to the ground at 150 mph (240 km/h) and higher speeds. The reason for using such a tall spoiler was to access 'clean air' according to the engineers who designed the spoiler. In the test, the spoiler did not need to be so tall. The spoiler was this tall to clear the trunk lid. The tallest the spoiler had to be was the same height as the roof.

Despite the success of the Superbird on the track, 1970 would be the only year it was made.

== Second generation (1971–1974) ==
Second generation
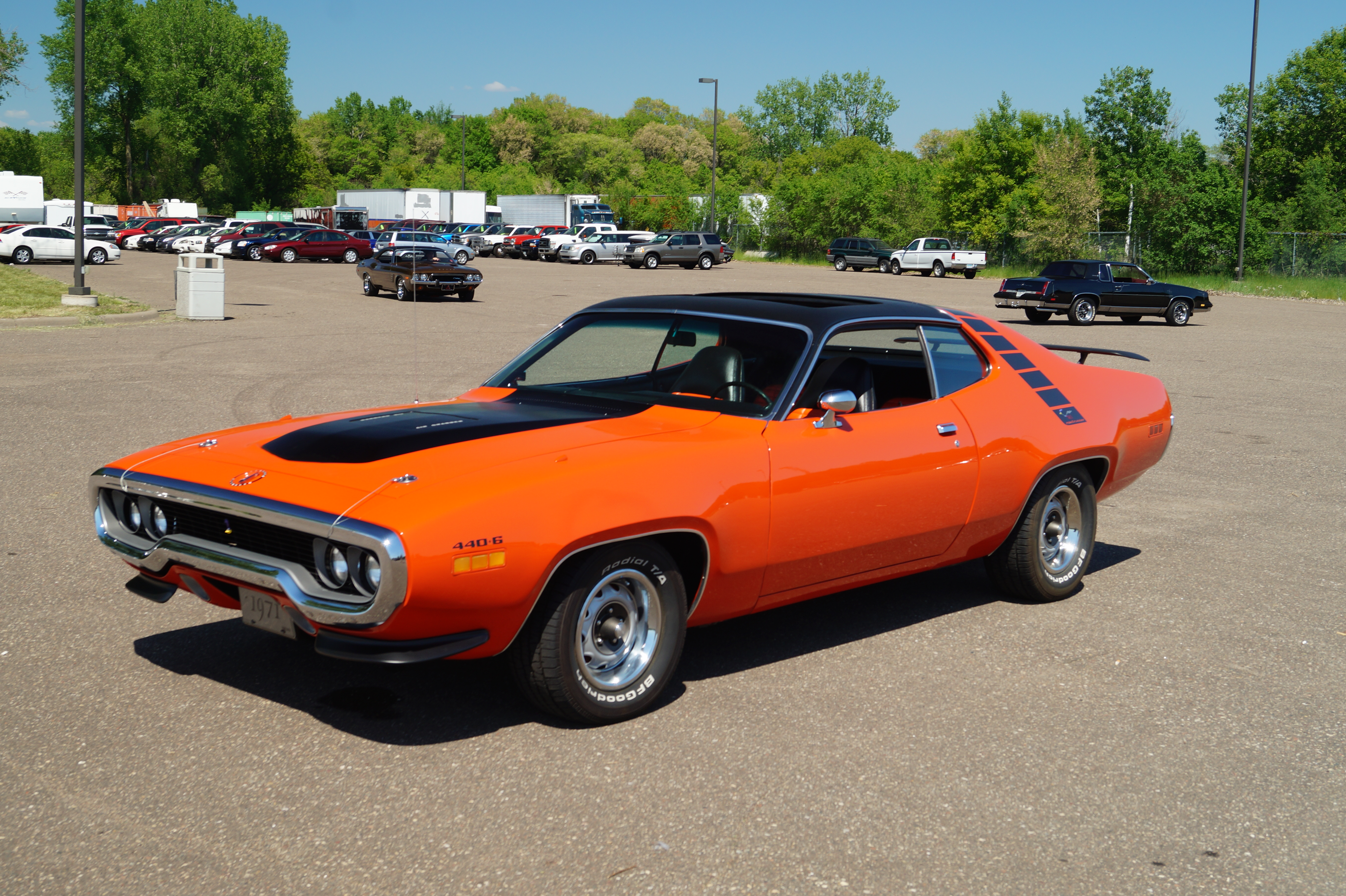
- 1971 Plymouth Road Runner 440+6

Overview
- Production: 1971–1974
- Designer: John Herlitz

Body and chassis
- Class: Muscle car
- Body style: 2-door coupe
- Platform: B-body
- Related: Plymouth Satellite; Plymouth GTX; Plymouth Fury; Dodge Coronet; Dodge Charger

Powertrain
- Engine: 318 cu in (5.2 L) V8 (1973–1974); 340 cu in (5.6 L) V8 (1971–1973); 360 cu in (5.9 L) V8 (1974); 383 cu in (6.3 L) V8 (1971); 400 cu in (6.6 L) V8 (1972–1974); 426 cu in (7.0 L) Hemi V8 (1971); 440 cu in (7.2 L) V8
- Transmission: 4-speed manual 3-speed Torqueflite automatic

Dimensions
- Wheelbase: 115 in (2,921 mm)
- Length: 212.4 in (5,395 mm)
- Width: 79.1 in (2,009 mm)
- Height: 52.9 in (1,344 mm)
- Curb weight: 3,640 lb (1,651 kg)

=== 1971 ===
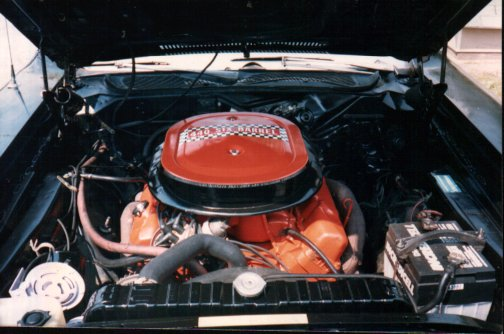
1971 Road Runner 440+6 engine

In 1971, the coupe bodywork was completely changed to a more rounded "fuselage" design in keeping with then-current Chrysler styling trends, including a steeply raked windshield, hidden cowl, and deeply inset grille and headlights. In a departure from previous thinking, the B-Body two-door bodies shared little sheet metal, glass, or trim with the four-door bodies. The convertible was canceled. The interiors could be ordered with 6-way power leather seats, thick deep-pile carpeting, and additional sound-proofing was installed. Air conditioning and power steering could be had, except on the Hemi. 1971 was a high-water year for the ride and handling for the Road Runner. The overall length was increased, but the wheelbase was shortened an inch. It also saw the introduction of the 340 4-BBL option and a detuned 383 "Road Runner" engine with 8.7:1 compression and power dropping to 300 hp (224 kW). In return, Road Runners with the 340 and 383 engines received a standard insurance rating without the costly premiums normally tacked onto muscle cars. The 383 would now run on regular gas. The 440+6 and 426 Hemi were available, though this would be the last year for them. The tall axle ratios with the 8 3/4-inch Chrysler and Dana 60 rear ends, as well as the wide and close-ratio 4-speed transmissions, could be had with any of the engine choices, though few cars were built with the six-pack or Hemi engines. Aerodynamics were much improved over the first-generation Road Runners, resulting in much-improved high-speed handling.

=== 1972 ===
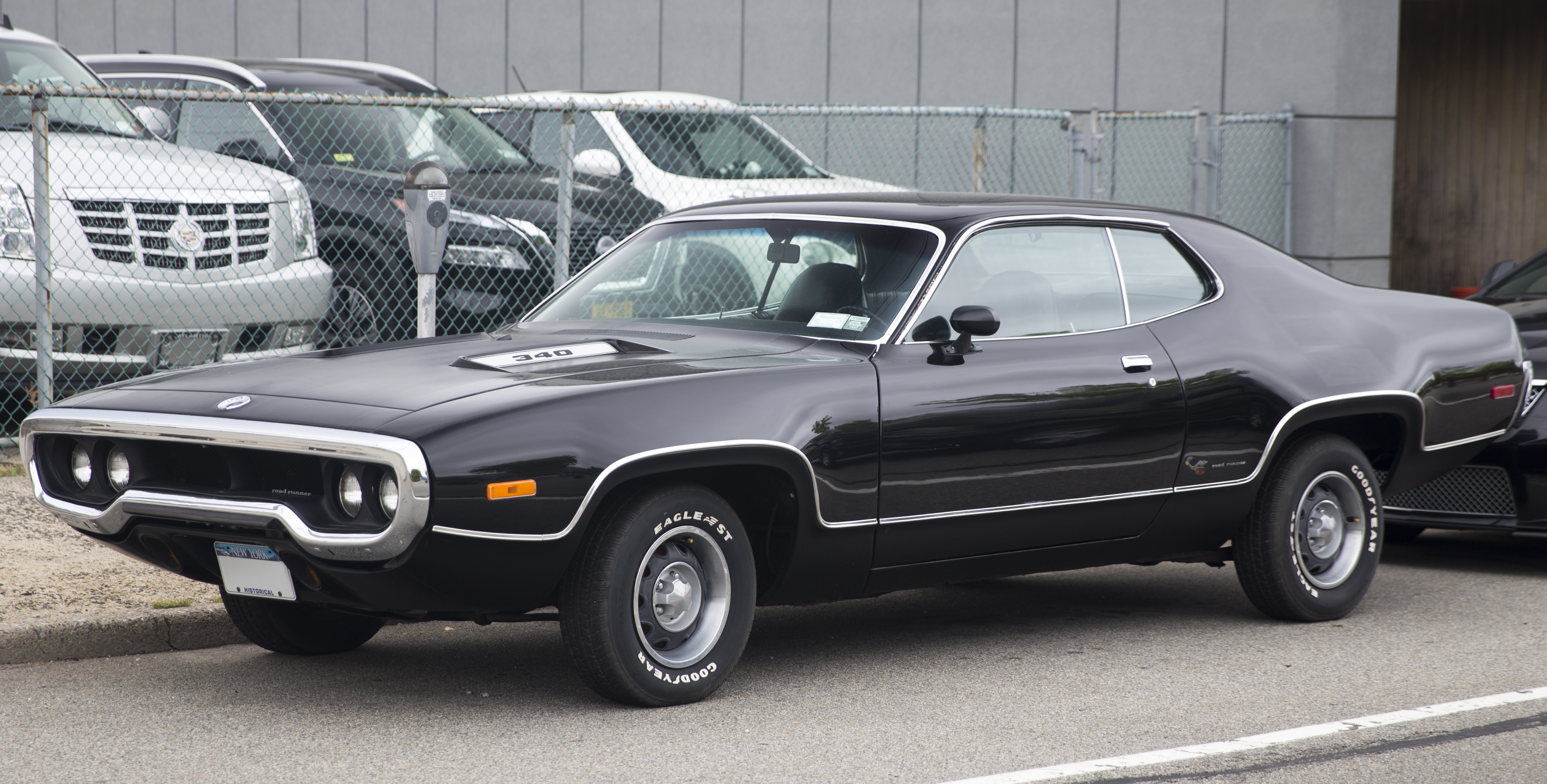
1972 Plymouth Road Runner

1972 saw new emission regulations drive power down and 1/4 mile times up. The 1972 model was nearly identical to 1971 with a few minor changes. The grille design was cleaned up, and the taillights were changed to match the grille's new aerodynamic look. Side marker lights changed from the flush-mounted side markers to the surface-mounted units adopted across the entire Chrysler line-up for the 1972 model year. The optional bumper guards for 1972 included a rubber strip surrounding the taillights and a rubber strip below the grille. The big differences came in the cutting back of performance options for the car. The suspension, rear axle ratios (a 3:55 ratio was the tallest available), and most noticeably, the engines changed. The big-block 383 was replaced by a larger-bore (and lower performance) 400 CID version as the standard engine. The small-block 340 CID and the performance version of the 440 CID engine (with a 4-barrel carburetor, performance camshaft, and dual exhausts) were also available, and for the last time, a 4-speed manual transmission could be paired with any of the three engines. All of the engines suffered a drop in compression ratios to allow the use of low-lead/no-lead gas and to meet the first round of emissions regulations. The 280 hp (209 kW) 440 engine was the basis for the Road Runner GTX (the GTX was no longer a separate model) and was available on Road Runners from 1972 to 1974.

For 1972 power ratings on all engines looked much lower on paper due to the new SAE net measurement system. The famed 426 Hemi was discontinued for 1972, and only five 440 Six Barrel equipped cars were produced before this engine option was dropped (it was determined the 440 six-packs could not meet the stricter 1972 emissions regulations) in the fall of 1971. The 1971-72 Road Runner sheet metal was used by several NASCAR racing teams for their racecars and ran well on the circuit during the 1971-74 seasons. Richard Petty won the championship both in 1971 and 1972 using the Road Runner-based cars, winning 30 races over the two seasons.

=== 1973–1974 ===
The 1973–74 models received completely new sheet metal and had more conventional squared-up front-end styling and changes to the rear that closely resembled the four-door models than the 71-72s. The interior options included retaining power seats and windows and offering plusher carpeting and seat covers, moving the car to a slightly higher level of luxury. The restyling helped sales, which were up 40% over the 1972 models. In testing, 1/4 mile times were getting close to the 16s, top speeds had dropped to barely over 125 mph (201 km/h), and the car moved further away from "muscle car" status. The base engine for the 1973-74 models had dropped down to Chrysler's workaday 318 CID V8 but equipped with dual exhausts which bumped the power up to 170 hp (127 kW). After 1972, no 440 with four-speed manual cars were built. The code E68 400 cu in 260 hp engine was the biggest Plymouth offered with the 4-speed, which could also be had with the 340 (1973), and 360 (1974) engines. The 318 was equipped with a 3-speed manual transmission as standard (though very few were built), and the TorqueFlite as an option, though at least one 318 engine 1974 car was built with the 4-speed manual transmission equipped with a Hurst shifter. The 440 cu in engine, boasting 280 hp was still available for 1973 and 1974, but only mated to the 727 TorqueFlite automatic, with 3.55 sure-grip 8 3/4 rear axle gearing available. (Some info from the Dodge and Plymouth Muscle Car Red Book, by Motorbooks International.).

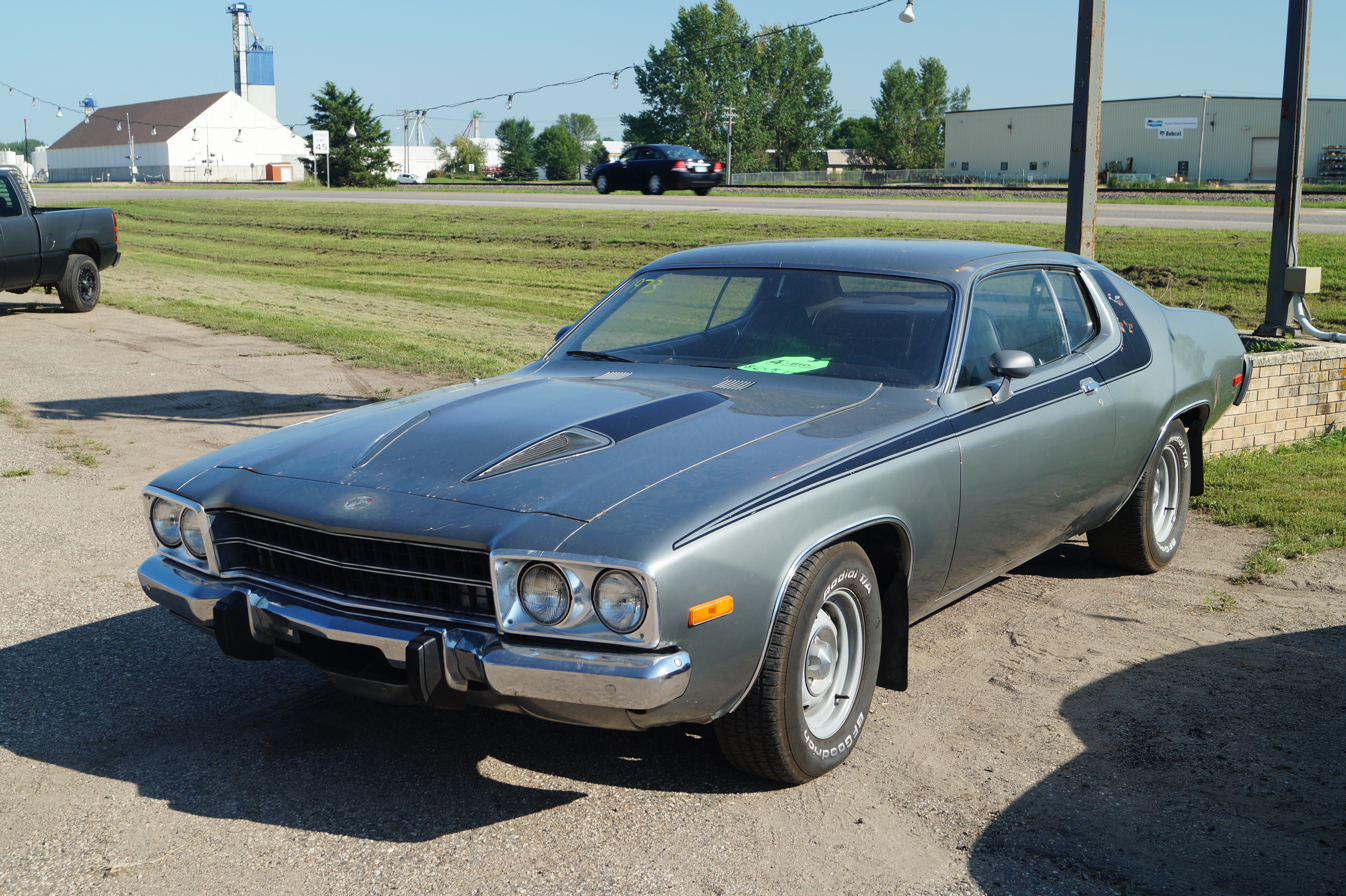
1973 Plymouth Road Runner

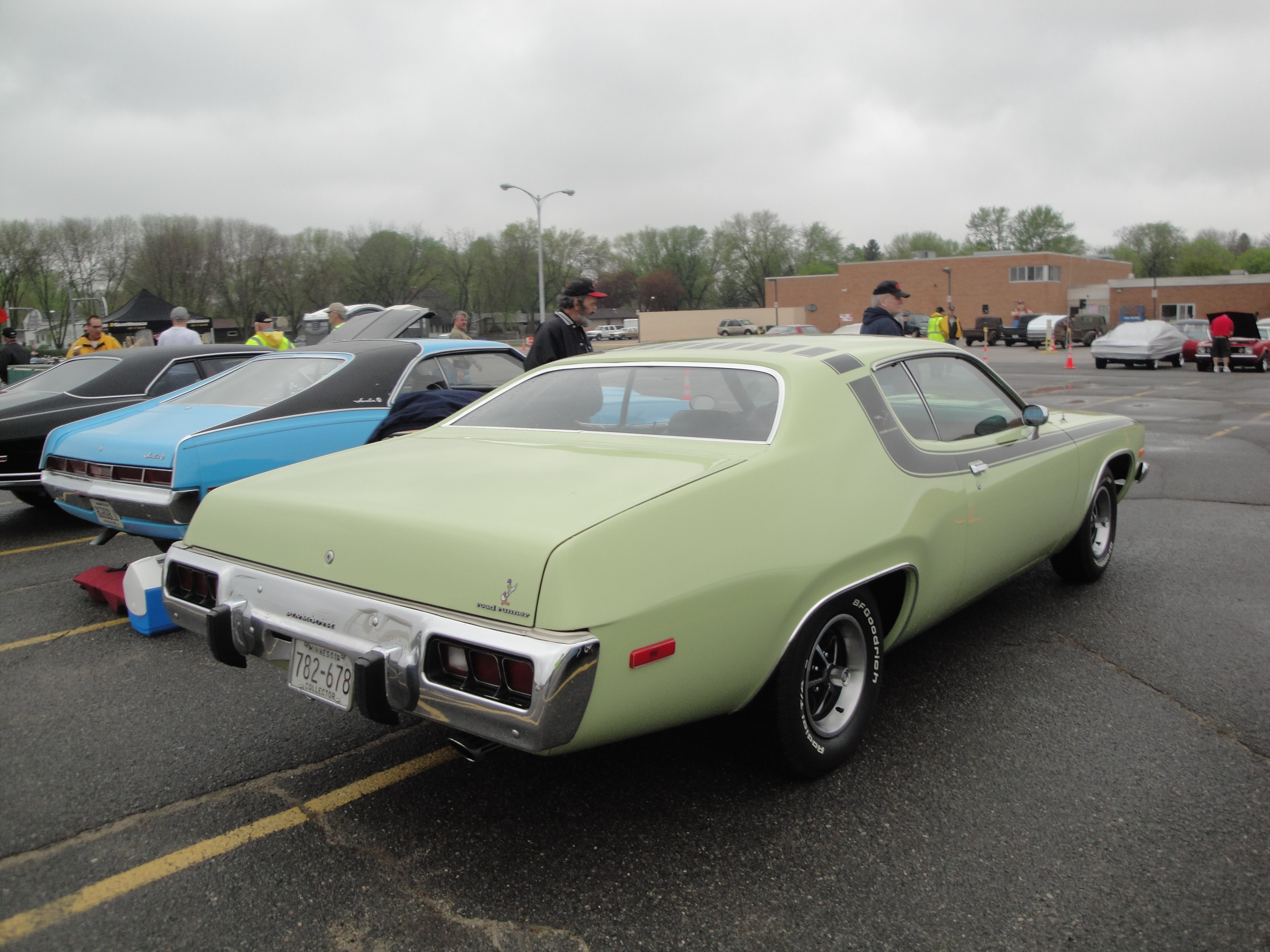
1973 Plymouth Road Runner (rear)

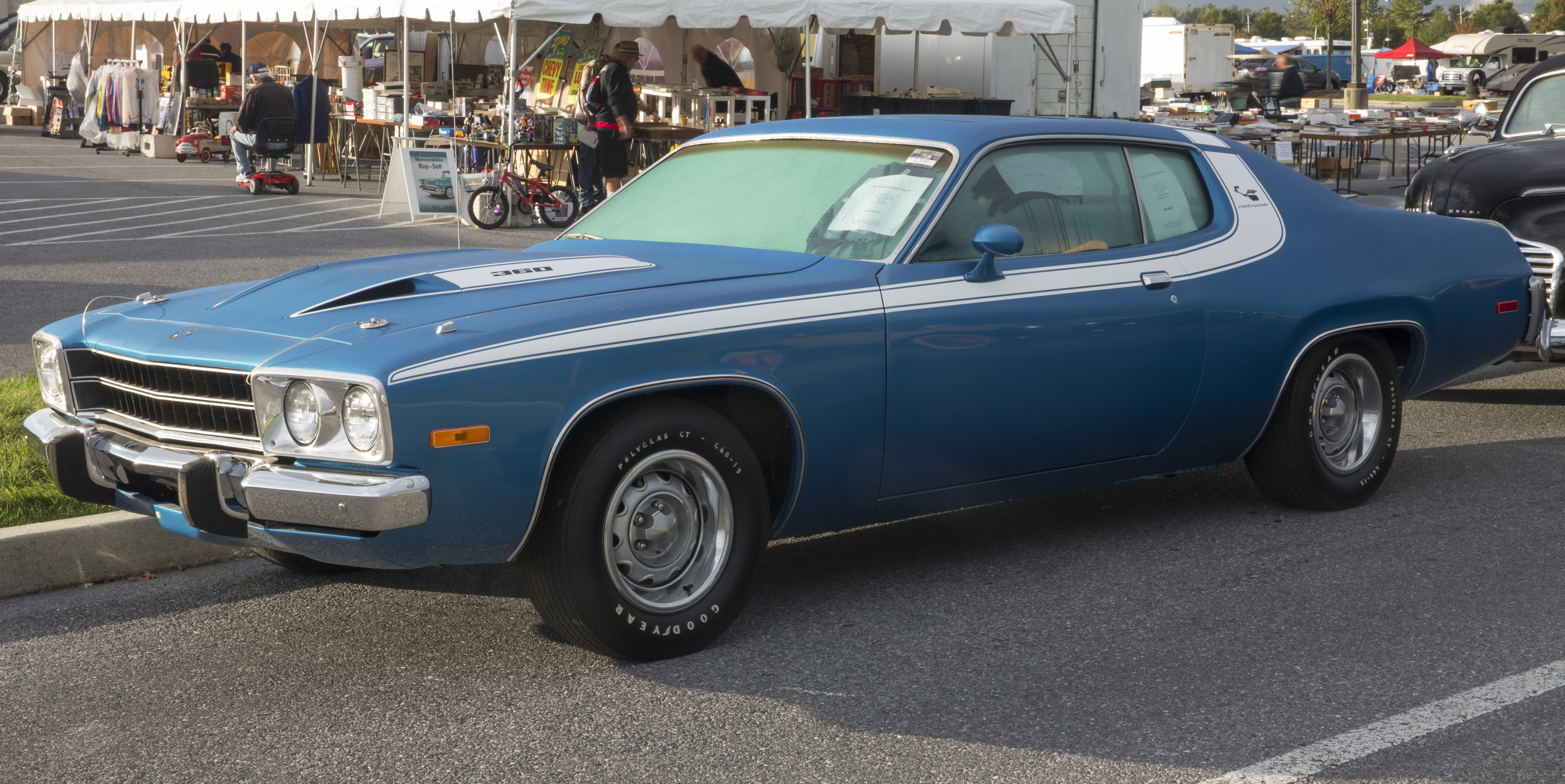
1974 Plymouth Road Runner

== Third generation (1975) ==
Third generation
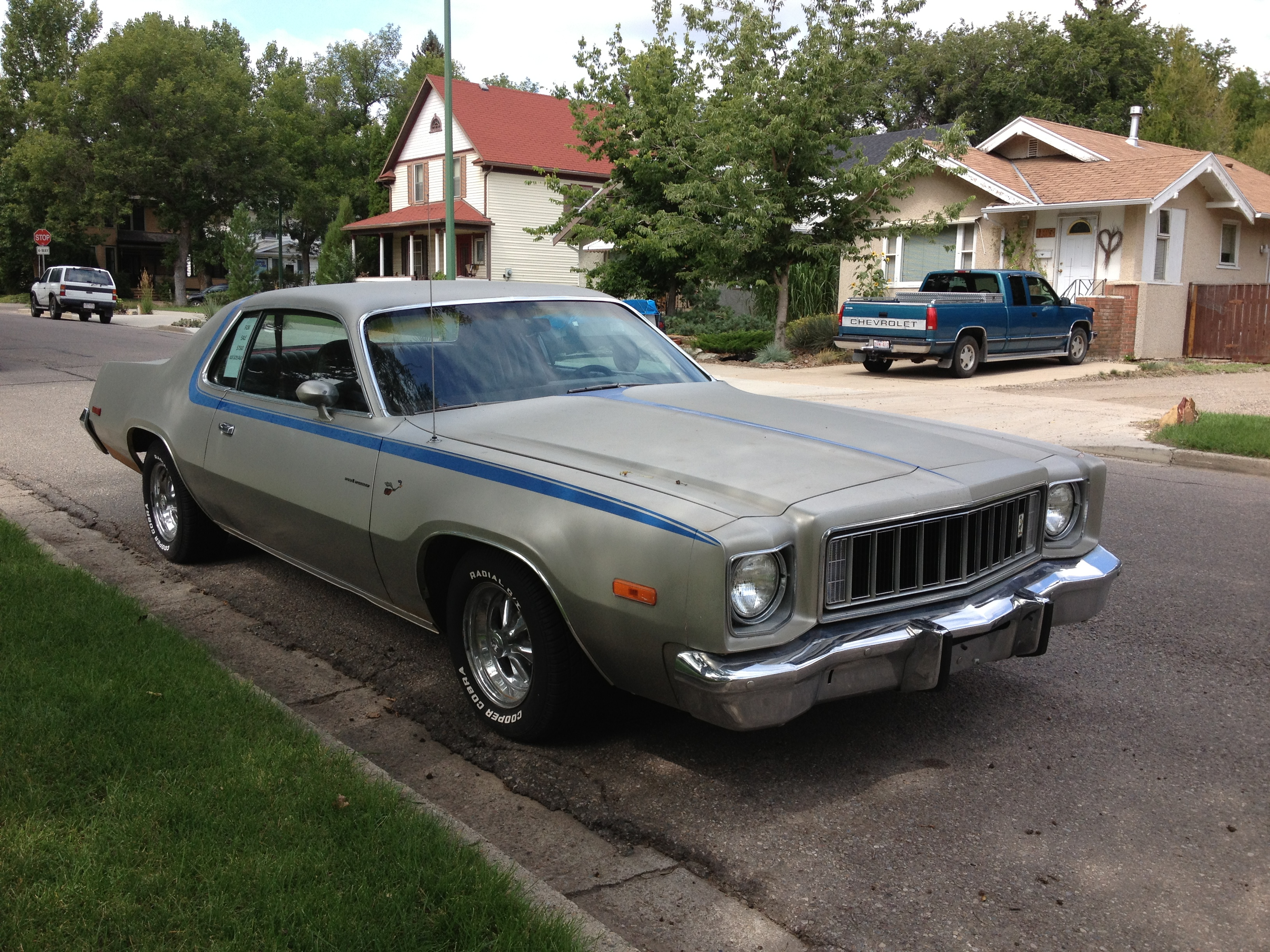

Overview
- Production: 1975

Body and chassis
- Body style: 2-door coupe
- Platform: B-body
- Related: Plymouth Fury; Dodge Coronet; Dodge Charger; Chrysler Cordoba

Powertrain
- Engine: 318 cu in (5.2 L) V8; 360 cu in (5.9 L) V8; 400 cu in (6.6 L) V8; 440 cu in (7.2 L) V8
- Transmission: 3-speed manual 3-speed Torqueflite automatic

Dimensions
- Wheelbase: 115 in (2,921 mm)
- Length: 213.8 in (5,431 mm)
- Width: 77.4 in (1,966 mm)
- Height: 52.6 in (1,336 mm)
- Curb weight: 3,500 lb (1,588 kg)

=== 1975 ===
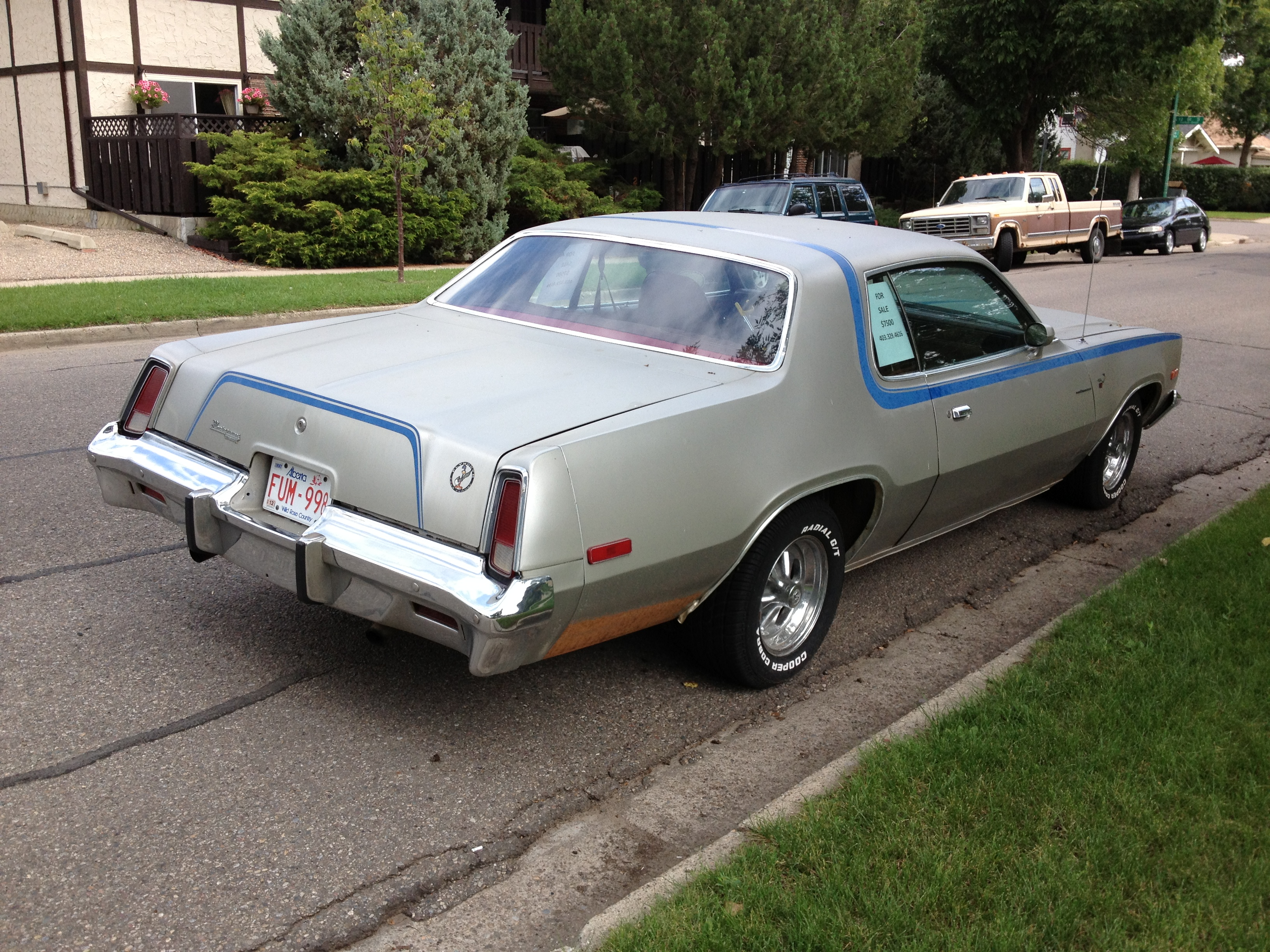
1975 Plymouth Road Runner (rear)

The 1975 model was based on the newly restyled, more formal-looking B-body, which was now called the Fury (the former full-sized Fury being called "Gran Fury"). Like Fury, the Road Runner could be ordered with plush interiors, a rally instrument cluster in the dashboard, power seats as well as windows. The Road Runner came with a blacked-out grille and a special stripe treatment to distinguish it from the Fury, as well as a heavy-duty suspension with front and rear sway bars and Rallye 14-inch or 15-inch wheels. As before, the 318 was the standard engine, but it was now just with a single exhaust and 145 hp (108 kW). The engine options were however extensive; with a two-barrel/single-exhaust 170 hp (127 kW) 360, a high-performance four-barrel/dual-exhaust (Code E58) 220 hp (164 kW) 360, and three 400 CID offerings; a two-barrel/single-exhaust 160 hp (119 kW), a four-barrel/single-exhaust 185 hp (138 kW), and a high-performance (Code E68) four-barrel/dual-exhaust/moderate cam 235 hp (175 kW) were also available. In Car and Driver magazine testing of a 1975 car with the Code E68 400 engine; 0-60 happened in 8.1 seconds, the quarter-mile times were solidly in the 16-second range, and the top observed speed was 121 mph (195 km/h). While just a shadow of the 1970 figures, this performance was at least respectable for the times. All engine choices were limited to the 3-speed Torqueflite automatic, with the E58 360 and the 400 engines being available with the 3.21 axle ratio gearing. Plymouth's most powerful engine; the 440, was restricted to police models, though it has been rumored that a few 1975 Road Runners were built (via special factory order by checking off the A38 Police Pkge option) with the 255 hp (190 kW) police spec 440, along with the police spec suspension and wider (7") rims. Only 7,183 Road Runners were built in 1975, and most (just over 50%) had the 318 engine.

Although the model name the Road Runner was based on changed from Belvedere to Satellite to Fury, the Road Runner remained a B-body through 1975. While the Road Runner name was planned to be on a B-body in Plymouth's published literature for the 1976 model year, the name was transferred to an optional appearance package for the all-new Volare.

== 1976–1980: Volaré trim package ==
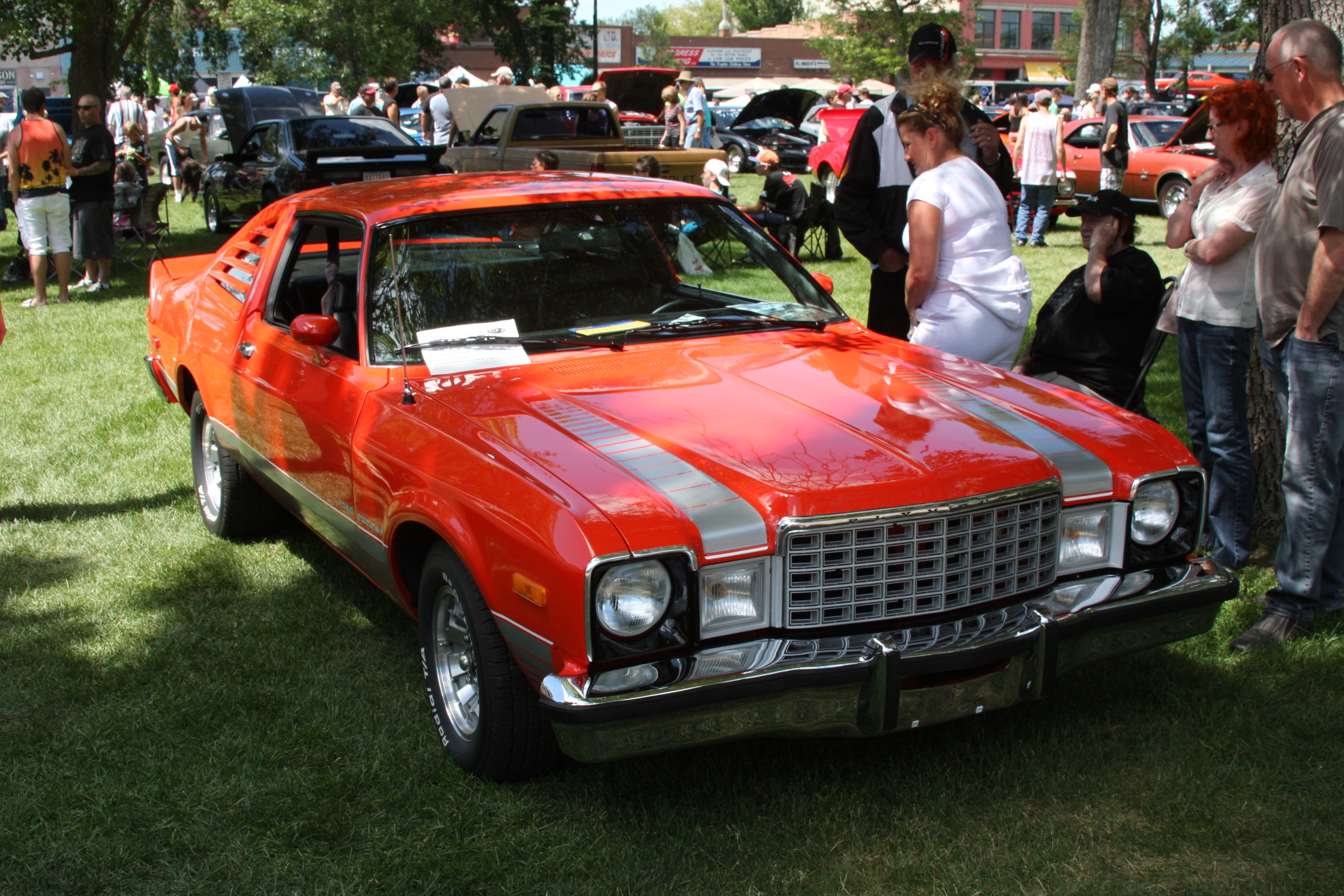
A Volare-based Plymouth Road Runner

In 1976, the Road Runner name was switched to the 2-door model of the replacement for the compact A-body Valiant/Duster series. The new F platform was marketed as the Plymouth Volaré, and the new Road Runner became a trim and graphics package primarily. The standard engine was the 318 V8 with the 360 CID V8 offered as an option (with a two-barrel carb for 1976-'77 and single exhaust) producing 160 hp (119 kW) and only paired with the three-speed automatic transmission. Suspension parts were borrowed from the police packages.

In 1978 and 1979, the 360 was offered with a four-barrel carb and, for 1979, dual exhaust, bringing power up to 195 hp (145 kW). The standard engine for the 1979 model year was the 225 CID "Slant 6" six-cylinder. For 1980, the 360 was no longer offered, and the 318 was the top engine.

The Road Runner continued as part of the Volaré line until its discontinuation in 1980.

== Awards ==
In 1969, the Road Runner was named as Motor Trend Car of the Year.
