= Plymouth GTX =

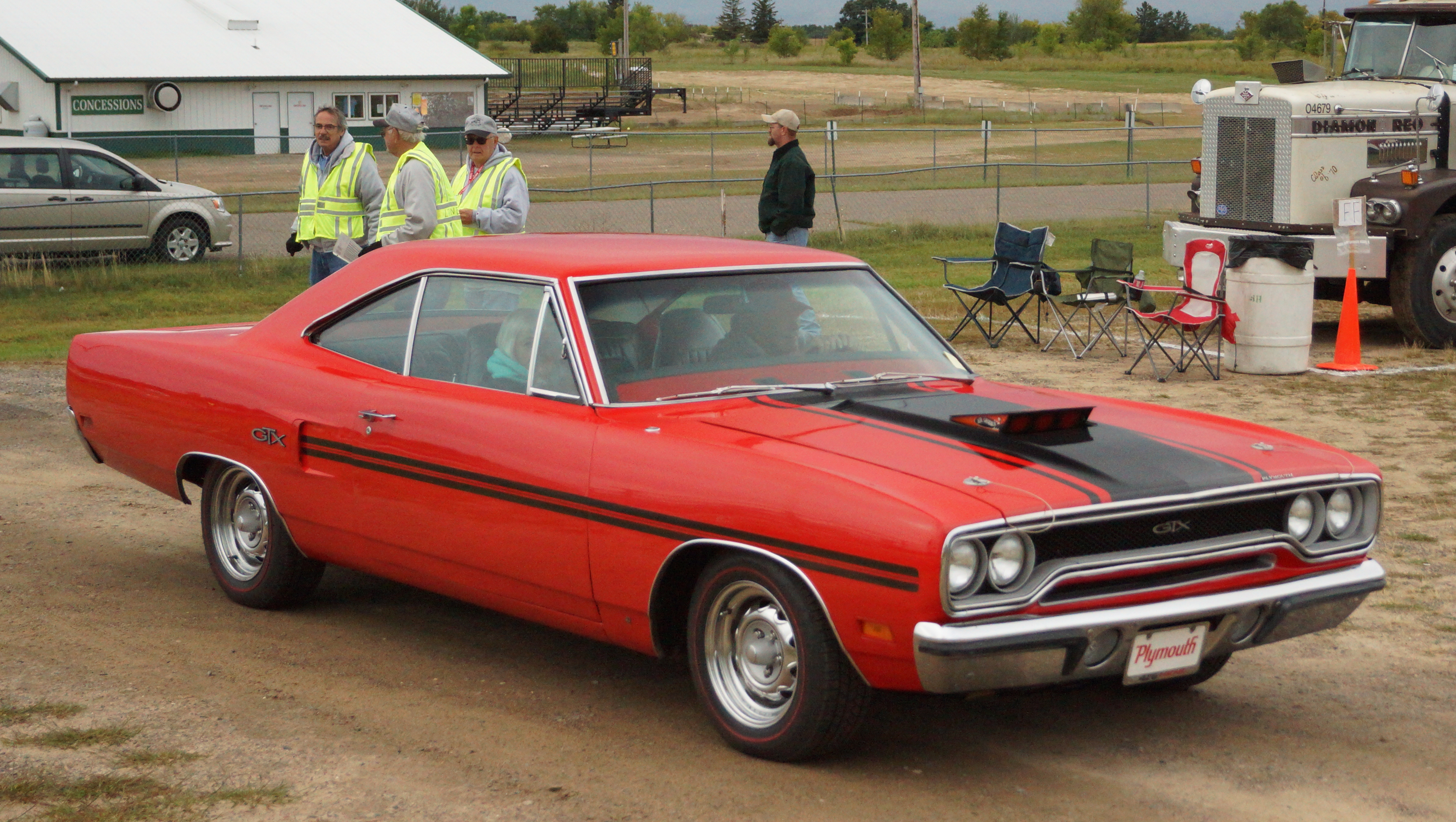
- 1970 Plymouth GTX

Overview
- Manufacturer: Plymouth (Chrysler)
- Production: 1967–1971; 44,178 units
- Assembly: United States: Detroit, Michigan (Lynch Road Assembly)

Body and chassis
- Class: Muscle car
- Layout: FR layout
- Platform: B-body

The Plymouth GTX is an automobile manufactured by Chrysler and marketed under its Plymouth division from 1967 to 1971. Introduced as the Belvedere GTX, it was positioned as a mid-sized upscale-trimmed performance muscle car through the 1971 model year.

== 1967 ==
First generation
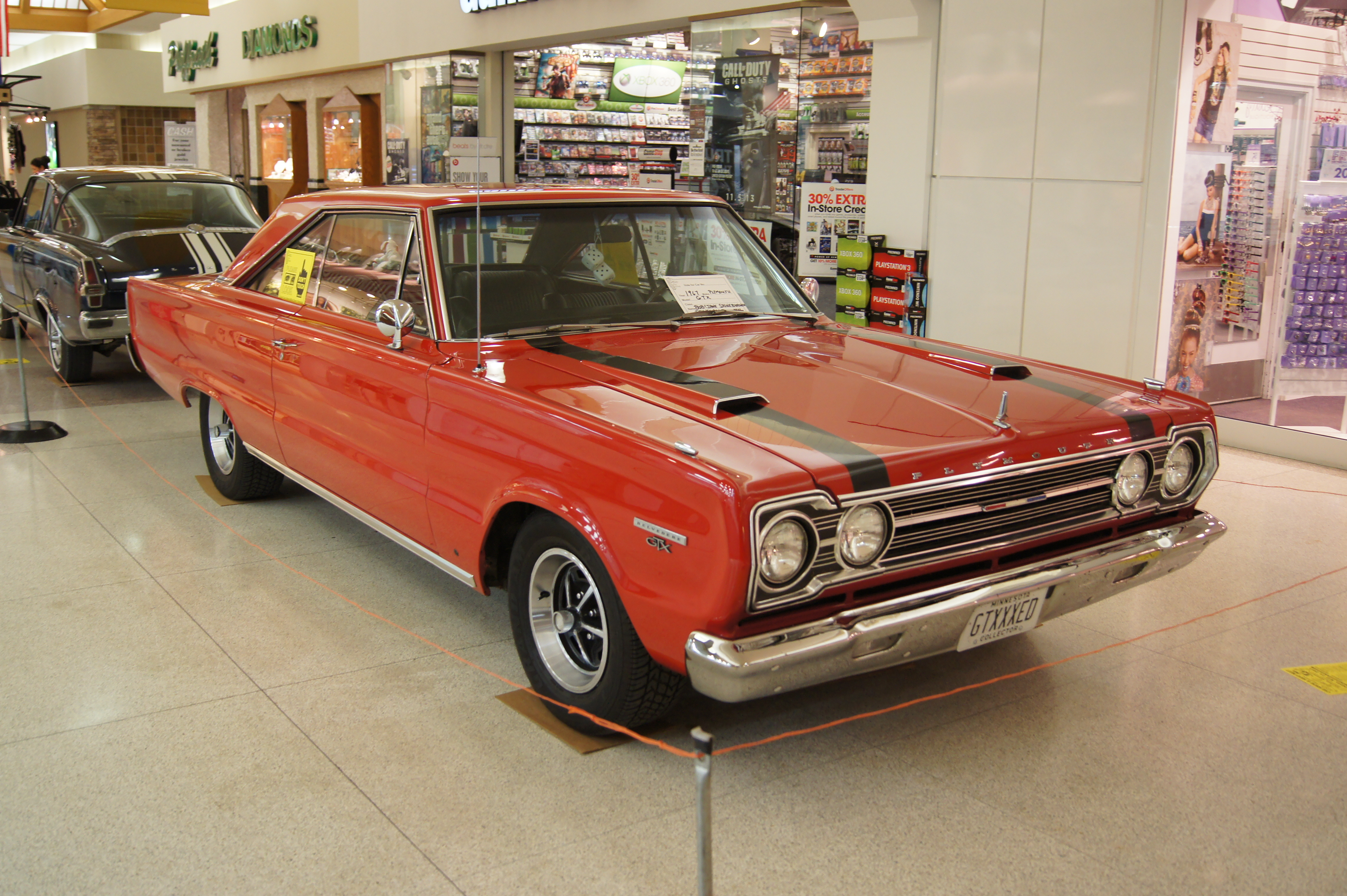

Overview
- Also called: Plymouth Belvedere GTX
- Production: 1967

Body and chassis
- Body style: 2-door hardtop; 2-door convertible
- Related: Dodge Charger; Plymouth Belvedere; Plymouth Satellite

Powertrain
- Engine: 426 cu in (7.0 L) Hemi V8; 440 cu in (7.2 L) RB V8
- Transmission: 4-speed manual 3-speed automatic

Dimensions
- Wheelbase: 116.0 in (2,946 mm)

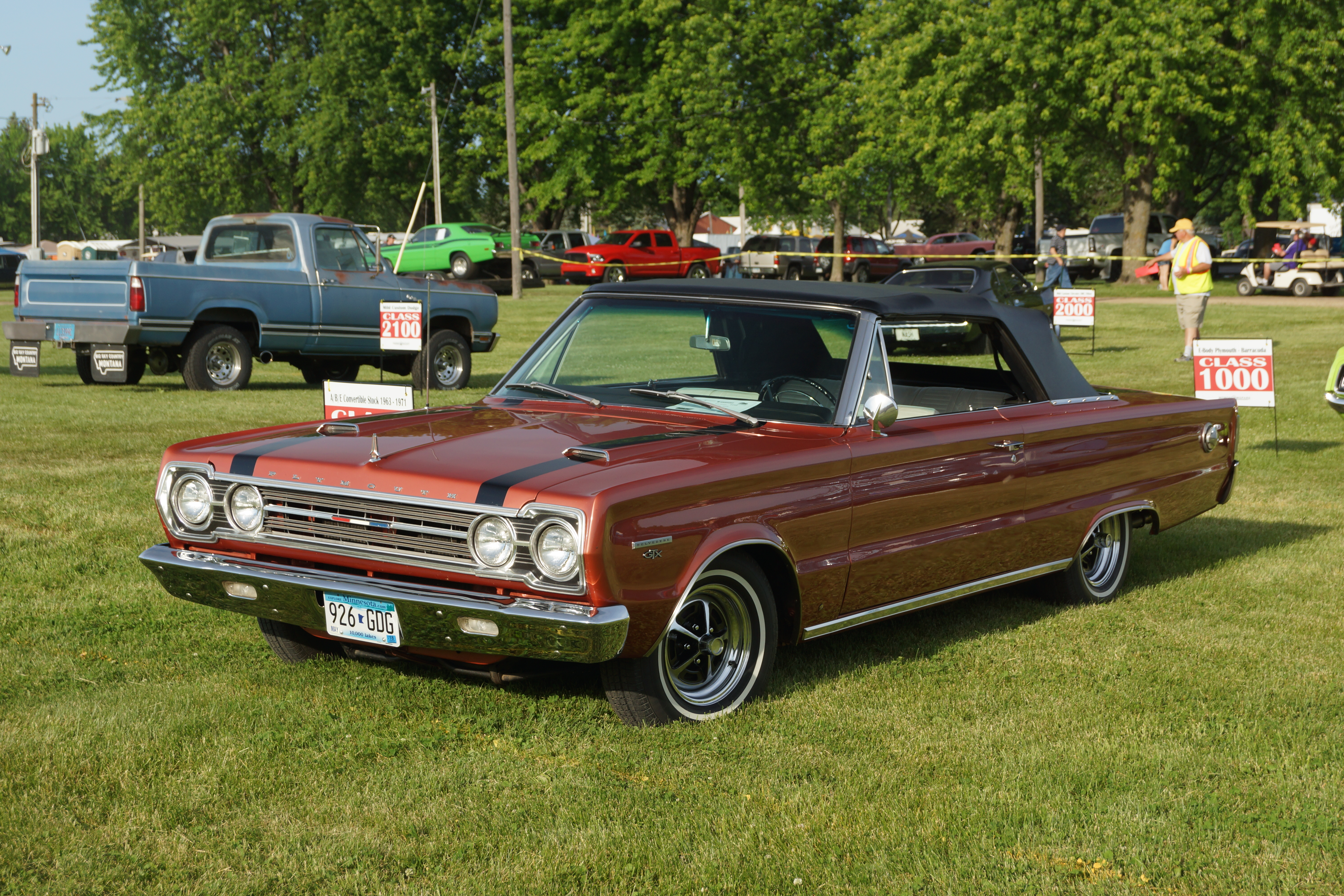
1967 Plymouth Belvedere GTX convertible

The GTX was based on the Belvedere, and was differentiated by a blacked out grille and special rear fascia, fiberglass simulated hood scoops with optional racing stripes, a chrome "pop-open" fuel filler cap, and a tachometer mounted on the center console.

The GTX was positioned as a "gentleman's muscle car". Standard was Plymouth's 440 cu in (7.2 L) V8 engine called the "Super Commando 440" rated at 375 hp (280 kW). Optional was Chrysler's 426 cu in (7.0 L) Hemi. A heavy duty suspension system was also standard.

=== Performance ===
Model	0-60 mph	1/4 mile time	Source
1967 440	6.5 seconds	15.2 seconds at 97 mph (156 km/h)	
1967 426 Hemi	4.8 seconds	13.5 seconds at 105 mph (169 km/h)	

=== Engines ===
Engine	Power	Torque
426 Hemi V8	425 hp (317 kW)	490 lb⋅ft (660 N⋅m)
440 V8	375 hp (280 kW)	480 lb⋅ft (650 N⋅m)

== 1968–1970 ==
Second generation
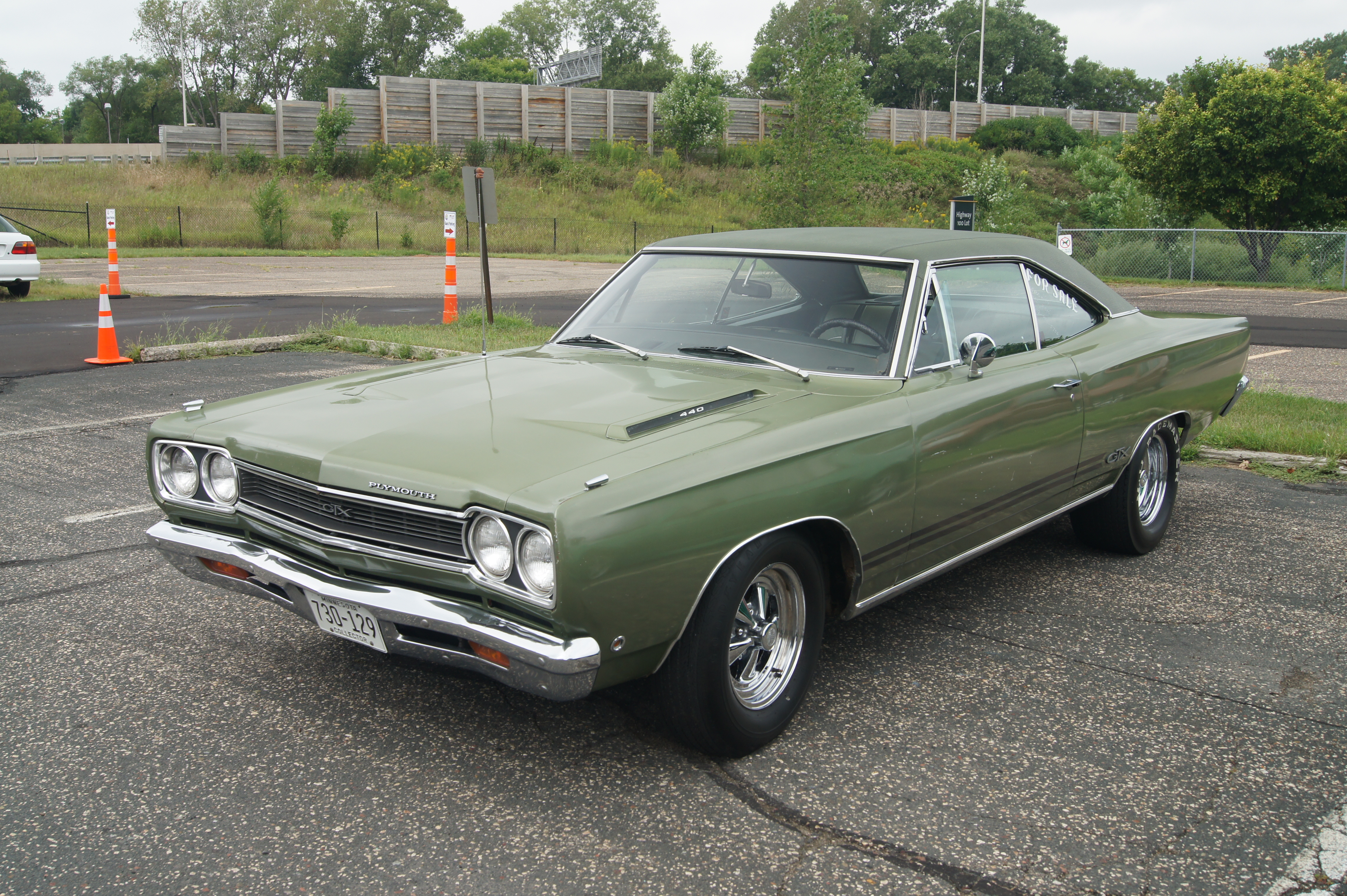
- 1968 Plymouth GTX

Overview
- Model years: 1968–1970

Body and chassis
- Body style: 2-door hardtop; 2-door convertible
- Platform: B-body
- Related: Dodge Coronet; Dodge Charger; Plymouth Belvedere; Plymouth Satellite

Powertrain
- Engine: 426 cu in (7.0 L) Hemi V8; 440 cu in (7.2 L) RB V8
- Transmission: 4-speed manual 3-speed automatic

Dimensions
- Wheelbase: 116.0 in (2,946 mm)
- Length: 202.7 in (5,149 mm)
- Width: 76.4 in (1,941 mm)
- Height: 54.7 in (1,389 mm)

=== 1968 ===
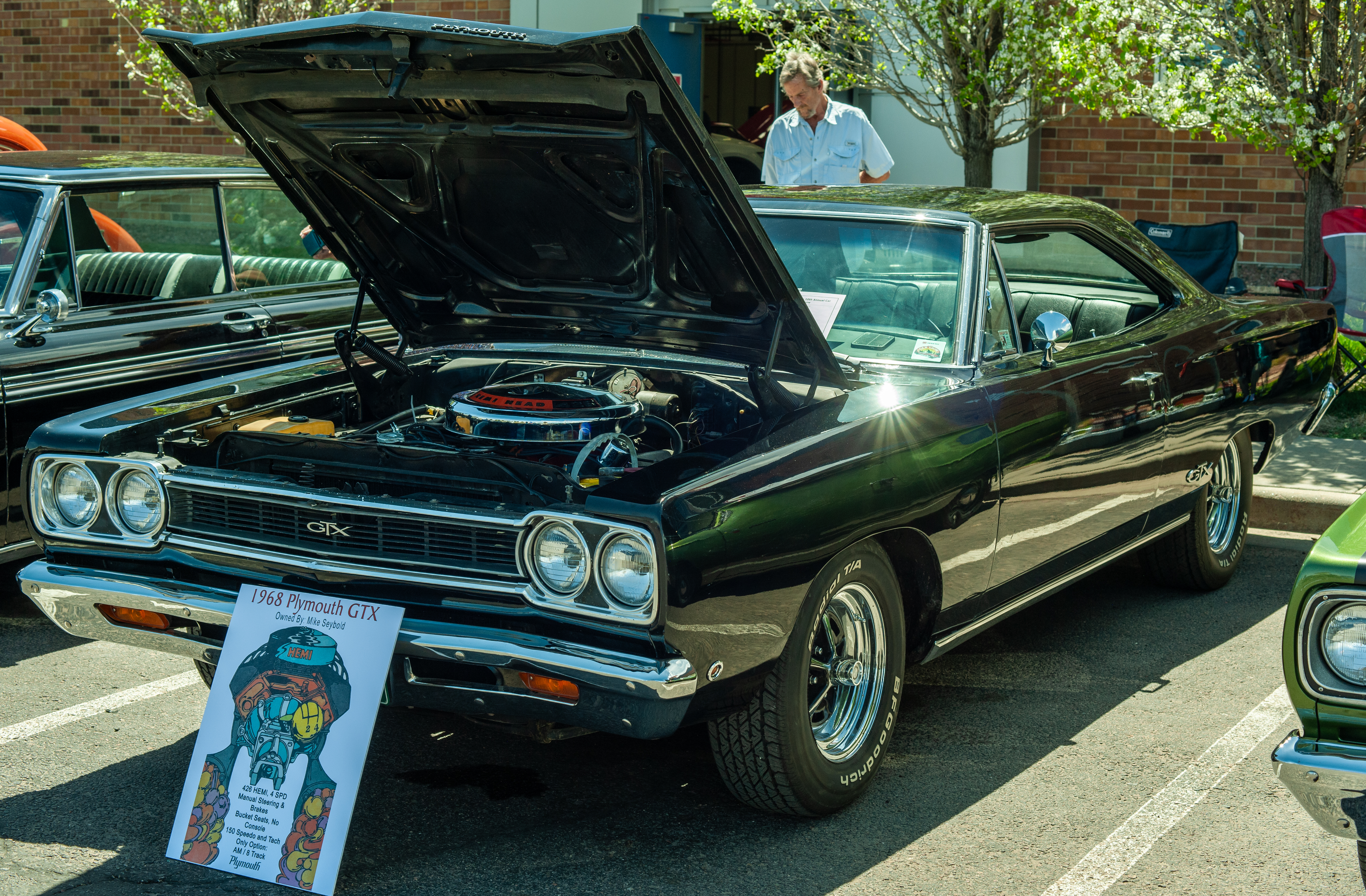
1968 Plymouth HEMI GTX

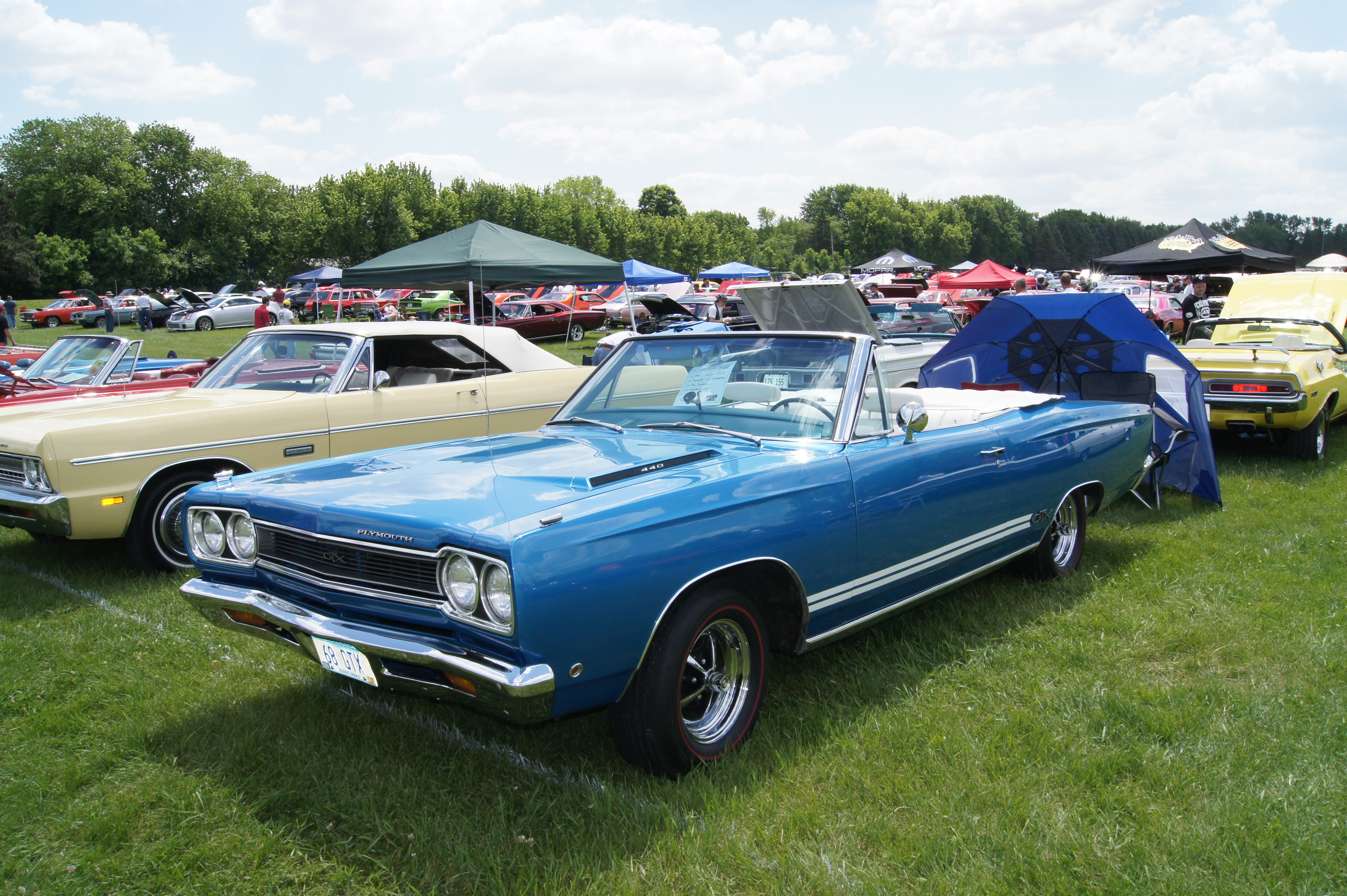
1968 Plymouth GTX convertible

Chrysler introduced major changes in the design of the 1968 model Plymouth B-bodies and the GTX was given a completely new look. A new hourglass body replaced the previous rectilinear design. The high performance 440 was standard in the GTX as was the TorqueFlite automatic transmission, while it was an extra cost option in the Plymouth Road Runner. The GTX used the Sport Satellite trim and was offered in two body styles, a two-door convertible and a two-door hardtop (no B-pillar). All featured dual horizontal "racing stripes" on the lower sides ending with a GTX emblem ahead of the rear wheel openings.

The GTX was positioned to be an upscale model of the Road Runner by adding elements of luxury to performance.

=== 1969 ===
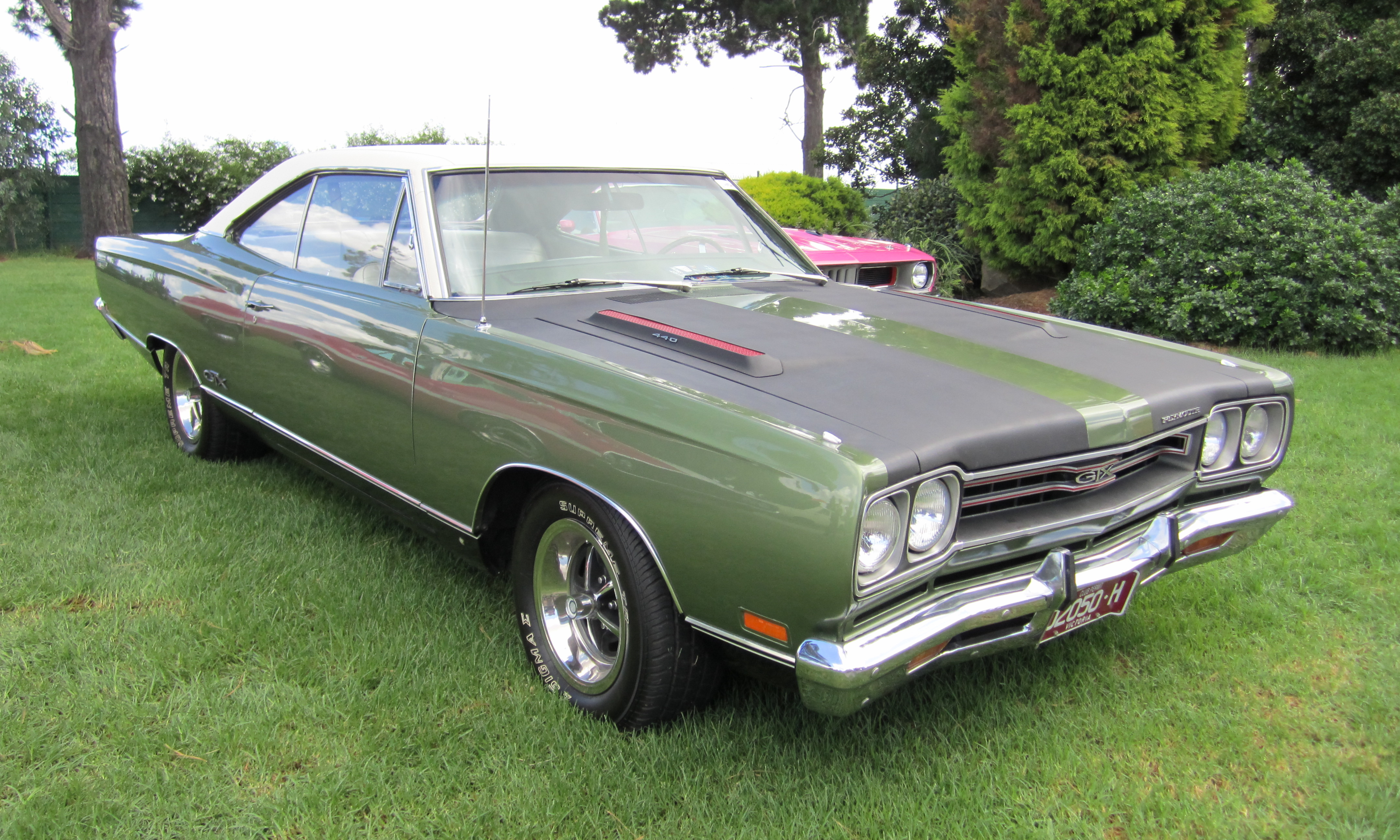
1969 Plymouth GTX

In 1969, the GTX's sales dropped when the Road Runner was also offered in a convertible body style. The GTX received minor cosmetic changes to the tail lights and grille, as well as the side marker lights. An optional "Air Grabber" hood (standard on Hemi-engined cars) featured functional openings on both sides of the hood that were controlled from the dash.

The 1969 GTX had standard black lower-body side paint in place of the previous stripes. The standard 440 V8 was still rated at 375 hp (280 kW). This was the last year that the convertible model was available on the GTX. Total production was 701 GTX convertibles in 1969. Of those, eleven were equipped with the 426 Hemi; four were 4-speeds and seven had TorqueFlite automatics.

=== 1970 ===
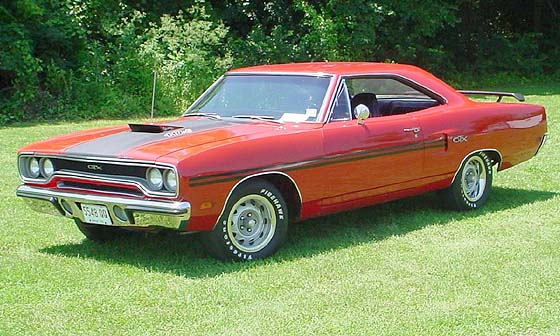
1970 GTX with an Air Grabber hood

The 1970 GTX received a minor redesign with a new grille and rear taillights. Sales were low as the car did not look much different from the Road Runner. Stylists made the lines smoother, and a "power bulge" hood was introduced, as well as non-functional rear-brake air scoops. The convertible body style was no longer available. The Air Grabber hood returned, but instead of having two narrow openings running length-wise as in 1969, it had one opening scoop located on the power bulge. The GTX was available with the standard 440 four-barrel carburetor. Optional were the 440+6 barrel (three 2-barrel carburetors) and the 426 Hemi. In keeping with the GTX marketing strategy, the 1970 model included many standard features.

The only other performance luxury model in Plymouth's lineup was the full-size Sport Fury GT, built on the C-Body platform. The GT was added to the lineup in 1970.

=== Engines ===
Engine	Power	Torque	Years
426 Hemi V8	425 hp (317 kW)	490 lb⋅ft (660 N⋅m)	1968 - 1970
440 V8	375 hp (280 kW)	480 lb⋅ft (650 N⋅m)	1968 - 1970
440 V8 6-bbl	390 hp (290 kW)	490 lb⋅ft (660 N⋅m)	1970

== 1971 ==
Third generation
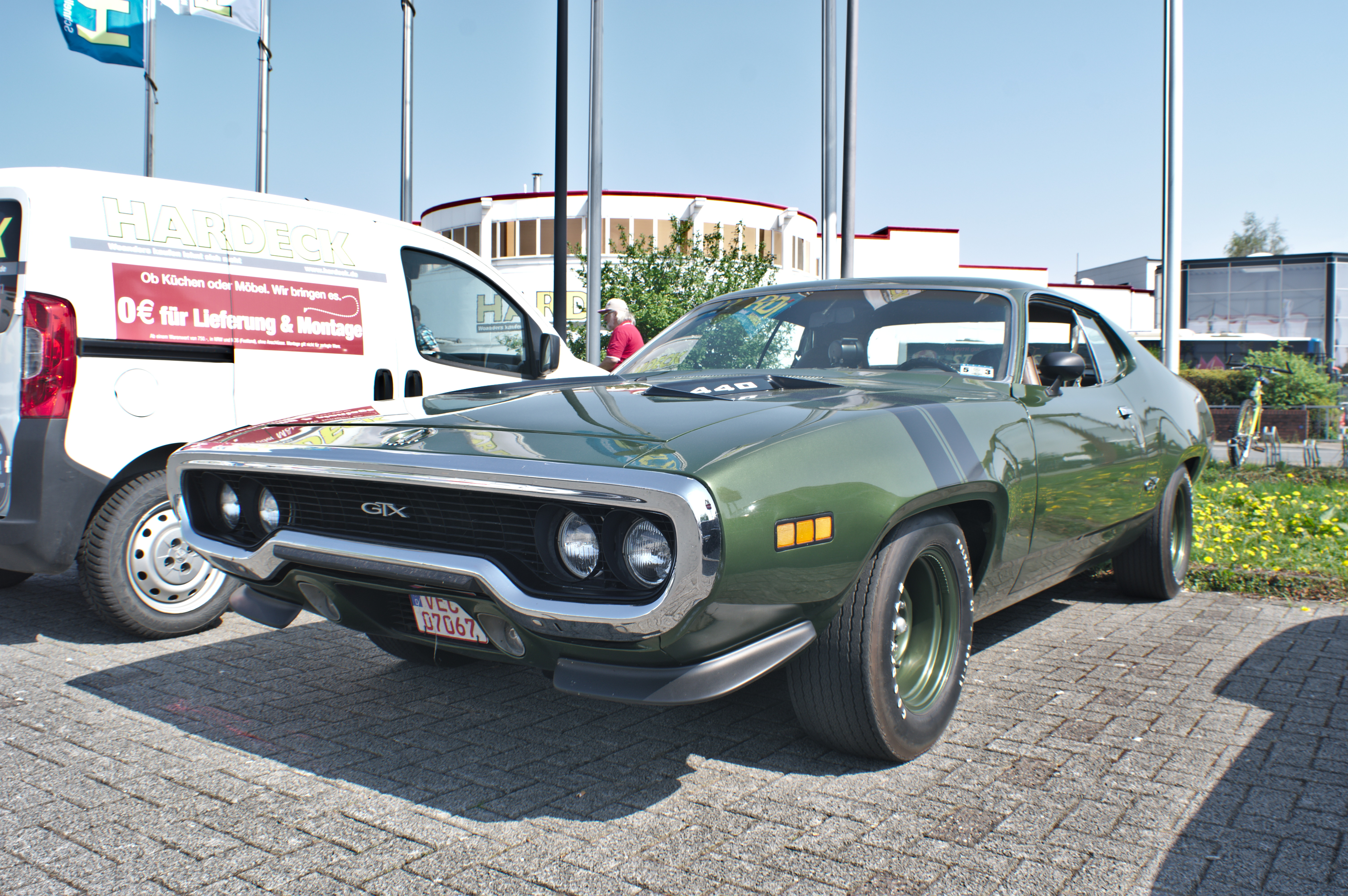
- 1971 Plymouth GTX

Overview
- Model years: 1971
- Designer: John Herlitz

Body and chassis
- Body style: 2-door hardtop
- Related: Dodge Charger; Dodge Coronet; Plymouth Road Runner; Plymouth Satellite

Powertrain
- Engine: 426 cu in (7.0 L) Hemi 426 V8; 440 cu in (7.2 L) RB 440 V8
- Transmission: 4-speed manual 3-speed automatic

Dimensions
- Wheelbase: 115.0 in (2,921 mm)
- Length: 203.2 in (5,161 mm)
- Width: 79.1 in (2,009 mm)
- Height: 52.9 in (1,344 mm)

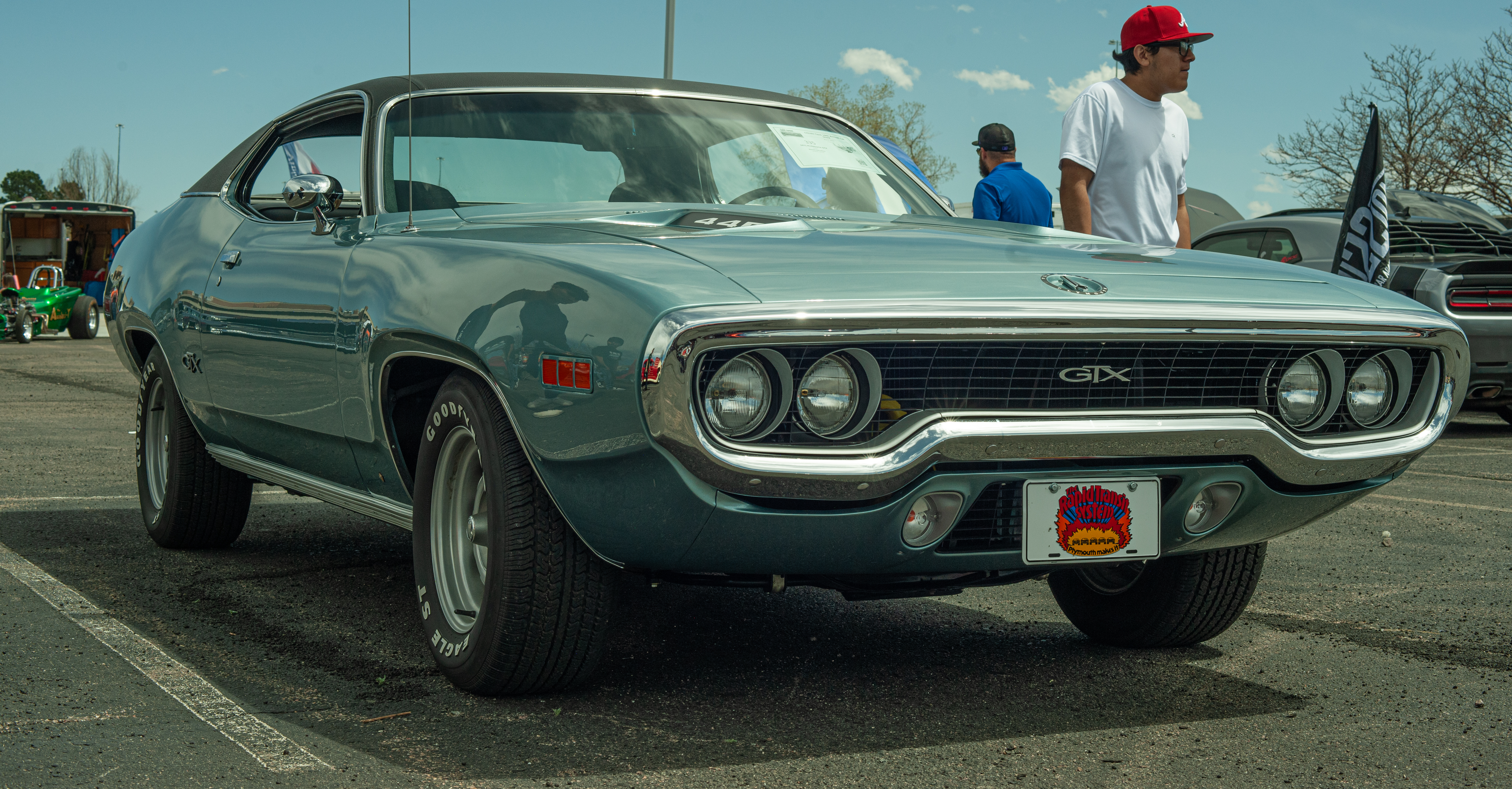
1971 GTX

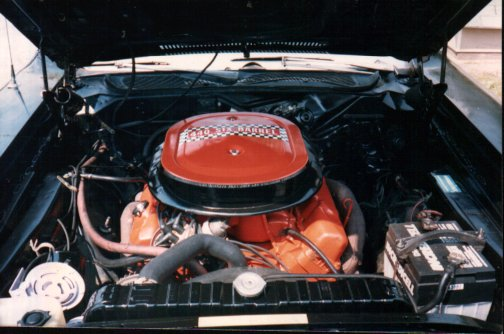
440+6 engine in a 1971 Plymouth Road Runner

The B-body was redesigned for 1971 and featured rounded "fuselage" styling with a raked windshield, hidden cowl, and a loop-type front bumper around a deeply inset grille and headlights. This was the final year for the GTX as a stand-alone model. The convertible body style was dropped.

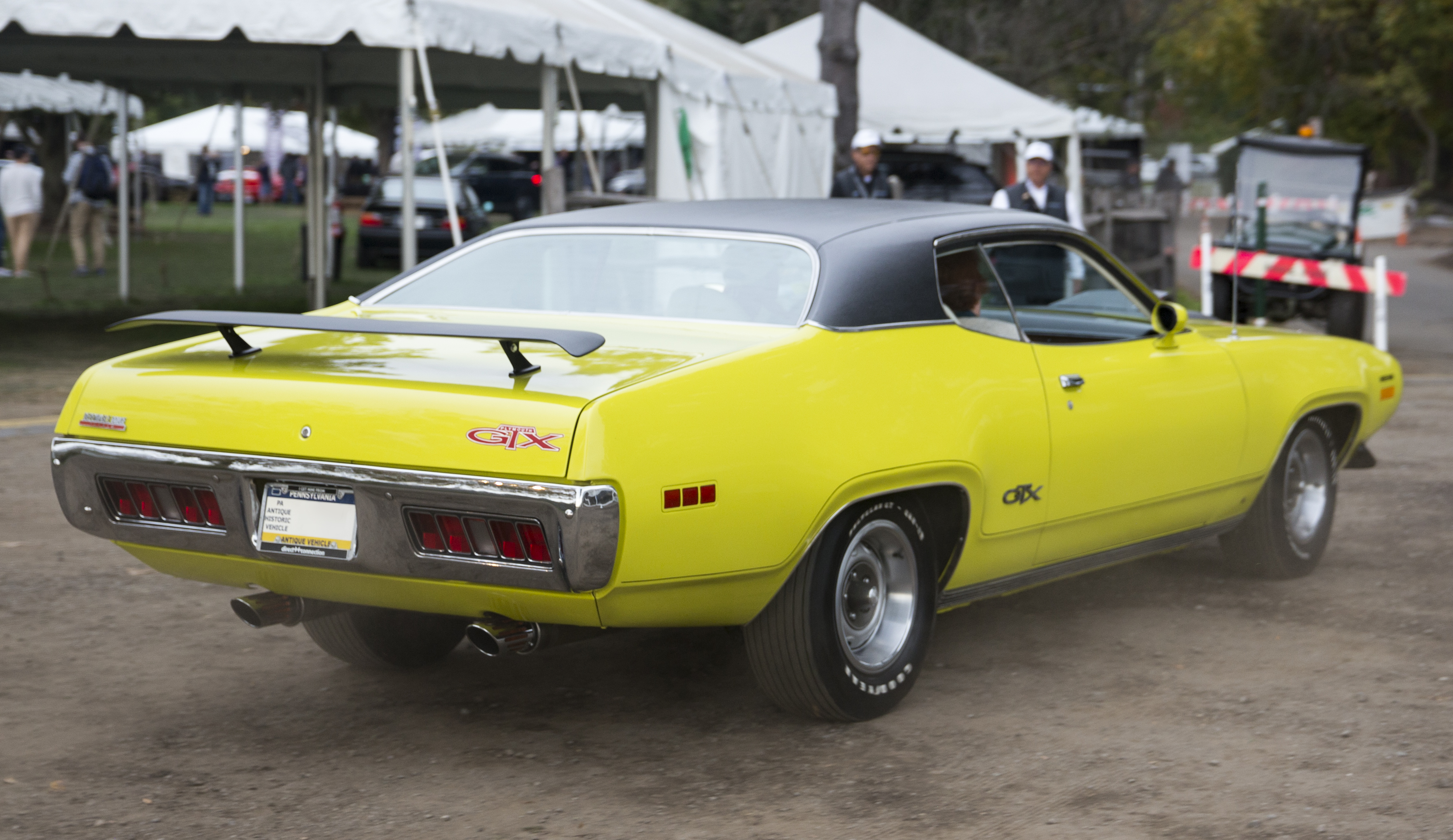
1971 Plymouth GTX, one of eleven manually equipped, Hemi-engined cars built

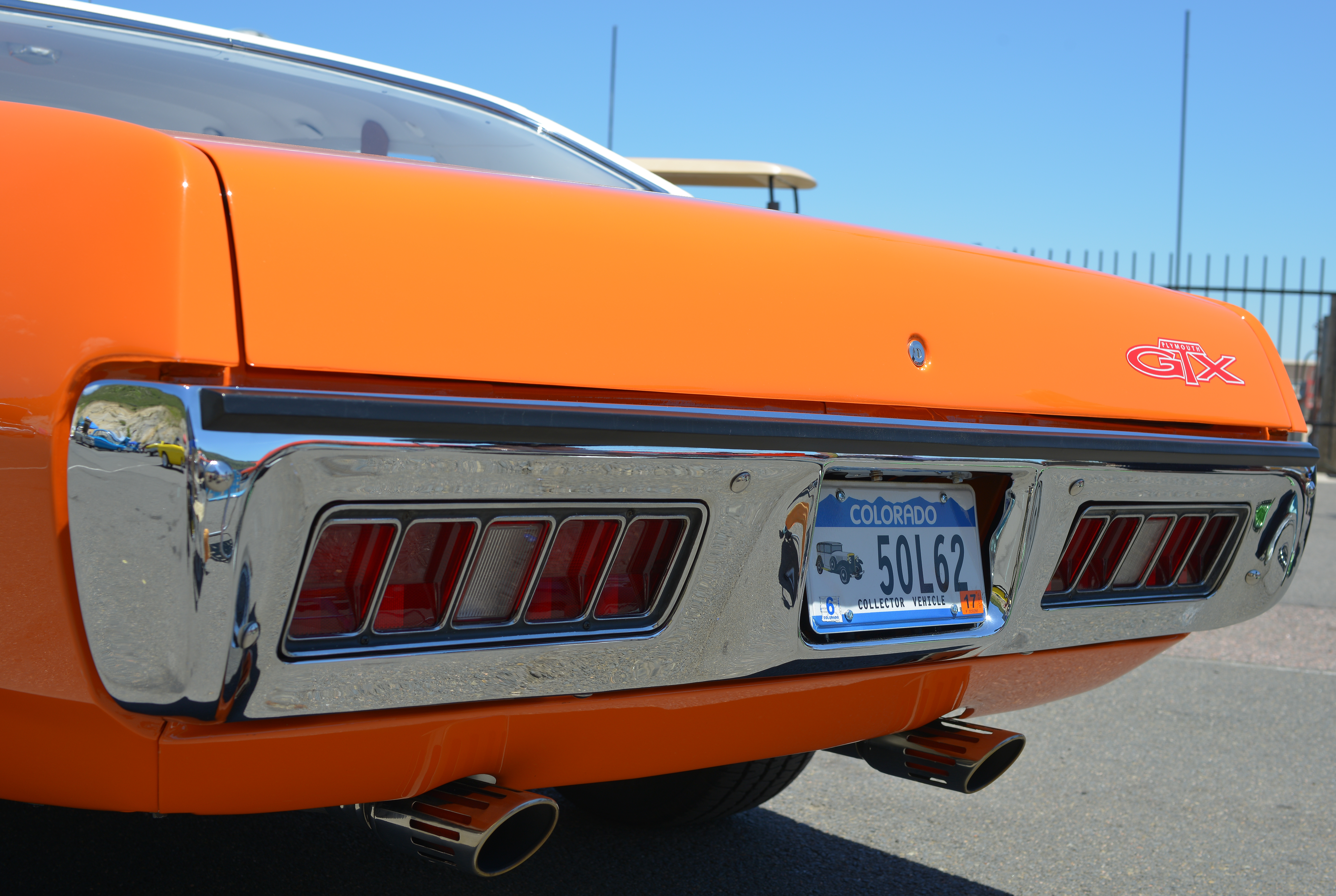
1971 GTX tail light panel with factory slotted exhaust tips

Engine choices were 440 four-barrel, 440 with three two-barrels (Six Pack), and 426 Hemi. Emission restrictions such as lower compression ratios and faster-acting choke operation lowered the base 440 output by 5 hp (3.7 kW), to 370 hp (280 kW). The 440 Six Pack was down to 385 hp (287 kW), but the Hemi was still rated at 425 hp (317 kW). Due partly to rising insurance rates on muscle cars, sales dropped to fewer than 3,000 units in 1971 (2,942), and only 30 cars were equipped with the Hemi engine, which was discontinued after this year.

=== Engines ===
Engine	Power gross	Torque gross	Power net	Torque net
426 Hemi V8	425 hp (317 kW)	490 lb⋅ft (660 N⋅m)	350 hp (260 kW)	390 lb⋅ft (530 N⋅m)
440 V8	370 hp (280 kW)	480 lb⋅ft (650 N⋅m)	305 hp (227 kW)	400 lb⋅ft (540 N⋅m)
440-6 V8	385 hp (287 kW)	490 lb⋅ft (660 N⋅m)	330 hp (250 kW)	410 lb⋅ft (560 N⋅m)

== 1972–1974 ==
The GTX as a standalone model was discontinued after the 1971 model year. For 1972 through 1974, any Road Runner ordered with the optional 440 was renamed Road Runner GTX and included the badging of both previous models.
