= Imperial (automobile) =

Brand of luxury vehicles made by Chrysler

- Type: Division
- Industry: Automotive
- Predecessor: Chrysler Imperial
- Founded: 1955
- Founder: Chrysler
- Defunct: 1983; 43 years ago
- Fate: Initially a car model by Chrysler, then a separate company division (1955–1975, 1981–1983)
- Headquarters: Detroit, United States
- Products: Luxury vehicles
- Parent: Chrysler

Imperial was the Chrysler Corporation's luxury automobile brand from 1955 until 1975 and again from 1981 through 1983.

The Imperial name was first used in 1926 for Chrysler's luxury model, the Chrysler Imperial. In 1955, the automaker repositioned and re-launched the Imperial as a separate make and division to better compete with its North American rivals, Lincoln and Cadillac.

After 1955, the Imperial would feature new or modified body styles introduced every two to three years, all with V8 engines and automatic transmissions, as well as technologies later introduced in Chrysler Corporation's other models.

== Background ==
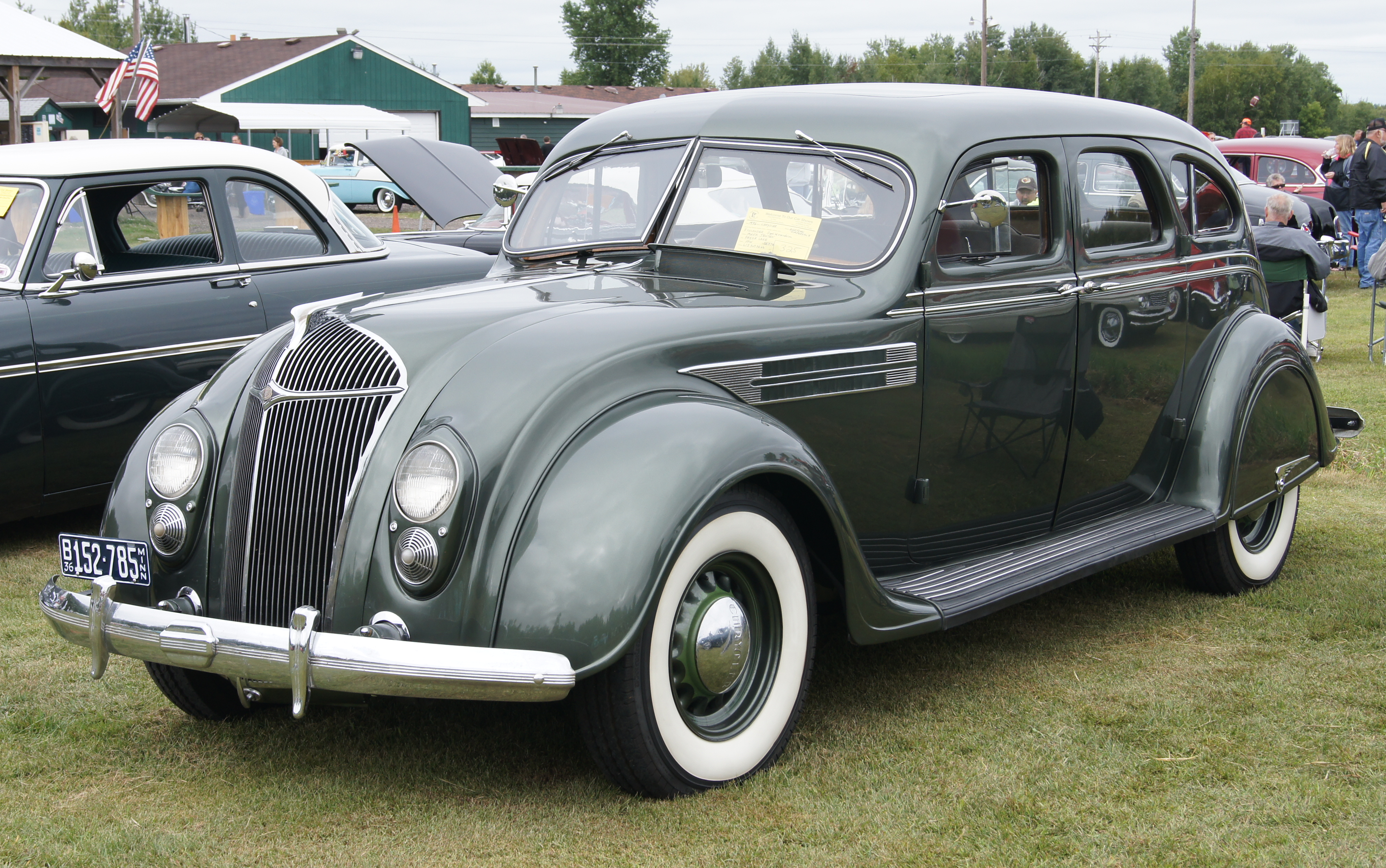
1936 Chrysler Imperial Airflow

The Chrysler Imperial was introduced in 1926 at the New York City National Automobile Show as Chrysler's flagship luxury vehicle. The new models were based on extended-length platforms of the company's full-size cars and competed with the likes of rival Cadillac, Continental, Lincoln, Duesenberg, Pierce Arrow, Cord, and Packard.

Production began because Walter P. Chrysler wanted a share of the luxury car market in the luxury car market in the United States and to expand the company's lineup, since its most expensive car at the time had only a six-cylinder engine. The new model shared the same body as the lower-priced Chrysler Six, but included a larger 288.6 cu in (4.7 L) engine. Subsequent generations were based on the Chrysler Royal, Airflow, Saratoga, and New Yorker.

Starting with the 1955 model year, the automaker dropped the Chrysler brand identification from the car and named it simply the Imperial. The objective was to separate the premium line from other Chrysler models and to better compete with other luxury manufacturers. Lincoln would make a similar move two years later, when Ford established the Continental Division as a standalone brand.

== First generation (1955–1956): A separate make ==
First generation (C-69, C-70)
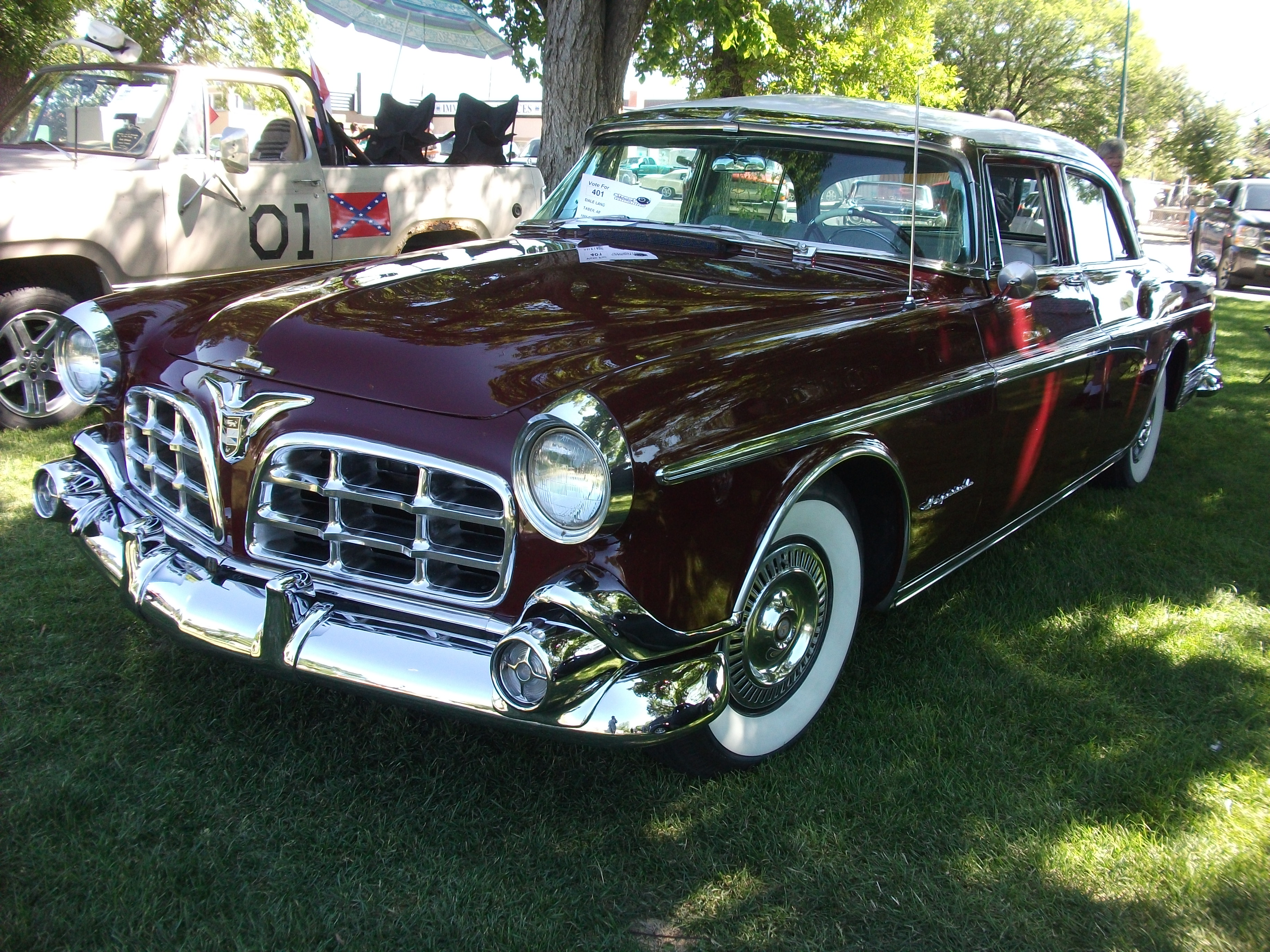
- 1955 Imperial Four Door Sedan

Overview
- Model years: 1955–1956
- Assembly: United States: Detroit, Michigan (Jefferson Avenue Assembly)
- Designer: Virgil Exner

Body and chassis
- Body style: 2-door Newport hardtop (1955); 4-door sedan 4-door Limousine; 2-door Southampton hardtop (1956); 4-door Southampton hardtop (1956)
- Related: Imperial Parade Phaeton; Hongqi CA72; Facel Vega Excellence

Powertrain
- Engine: 331 cu in (5.4 L) Hemi V8; 354 cu in (5.8 L) Hemi V8
- Transmission: 2-speed PowerFlite automatic (1955); 3-speed TorqueFlite A488 automatic (1956)

Dimensions
- Wheelbase: 1955:130.0 in (3,302 mm); 1956:133.0 in (3,378 mm)
- Length: 1955: 223.0 in (5,664 mm); 1956: 229.6 in (5,832 mm)
- Width: 1955: 79.1 in (2,009 mm); 1956: 78.8 in (2,002 mm)
- Height: 1955: 61.2 in (1,554 mm); 1956: 61.5 in (1,562 mm)
- Curb weight: 4,700–4,900 lb (2,100–2,200 kg)

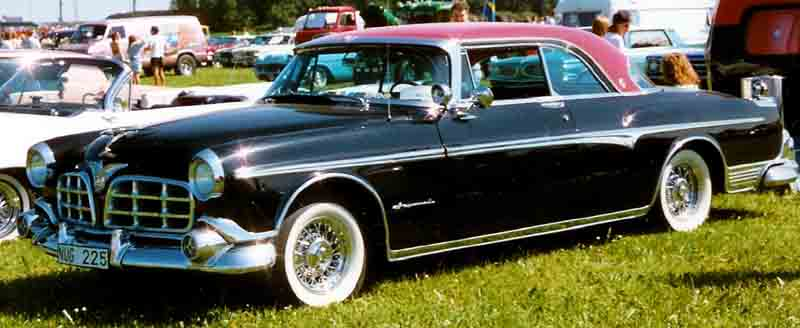
1955 Imperial Newport

In 1954, advertising by Chrysler Corporation began to separate the Imperial from the Chrysler Division car line to prepare for the big change coming in 1955. The Imperial was launched and registered as a separate marque (make) starting with the 1955 model year under the Imperial Division of Chrysler Corporation. The marketing objective was to position the luxury cars apart from the Chrysler brand. Chrysler Corporation sent notices to all state motor vehicle licensing agencies in the then-48 states, informing them, that the Imperial, beginning in 1955, would no longer be registered as a Chrysler; but as a separate make. Once the "Imperial" brand was introduced, Cadillac no longer used the "Imperial" name for its top-level limousines starting in 1955.

Chrysler introduced the "100 Million Look" Styling by Virgil Exner, who would define Imperial's look (and the look of cars from the other four Chrysler divisions) from 1955 until 1963.

Chrysler was also the supplier of engines and transmissions used in the Imperial with French automaker Facel Vega, which offered the Facel Vega Excellence, while Chinese automaker Hongqi used an Imperial locally found in China to manufacture the Hongqi CA72.

=== 1955 ===
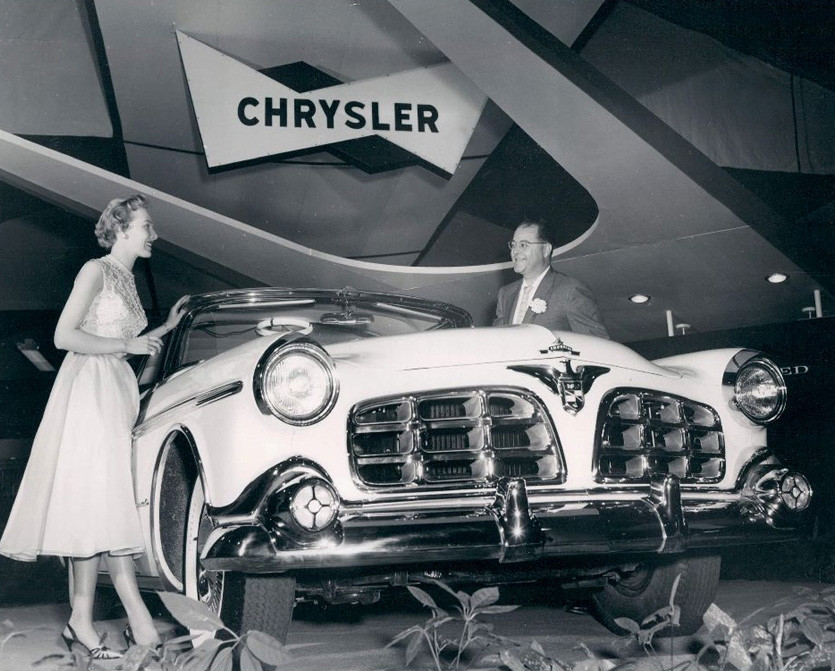
1955 Imperial car model shown on display at January 1955 Chicago Auto Show, in the first year of its separation from Chrysler.

The 1955 models are said to be inspired by Exner's own 1952 Chrysler Imperial Parade Phaeton show cars (which were themselves later updated to match the 1955-56 Imperials). The platform and bodyshell were shared with that year's big Chryslers, but the Imperial had a wheelbase that was 4.0 inches (102 mm) longer, providing it with more rear-seat legroom, had a wide-spaced split egg-crate grille, the same as that used on the Chrysler 300 "executive hot rod", and had free-standing "gunsight" taillights mounted above the rear quarters, which were similar to those on the Exner's 1951 Chrysler K-310 concept car. Gunsight taillights were also known as "sparrow-strainer" taillights, named after the device used to keep birds out of jet engines. Such taillights were separated from the fender and surrounded by a ring and became an Imperial fixture through 1962, although they would only be free-standing in 1955-56 and again in 1961-62. Two C-69 models were available, including the two-door Newport hardtop coupe (3,418 built) and pillared four-door sedan (7,840 built), along with an additional C-70 Crown limousine (172 built). The Newport nameplate was only used for 1955 and renamed the Southampton beginning in 1956. The FirePower V8 engine was Chrysler's first-generation Hemi with a displacement of 331 cu in (5.4 L), developing 250 brake horsepower (186 kW). Power brakes and power steering were standard, along with Chrysler's PowerFlite automatic transmission. One major option on the 1955 and 1956 Imperials was air conditioning, at a cost of $535. Production totaled 11,430, more than twice the 1954 figure, positioning the Imperial as much more exclusive in comparison to more widely available and affordable Lincoln and Cadillac. Manufacturers list price for the Newport hardtop was $4,720 ($56,728 in 2025 dollars), while the Imperial Crown limousine was $7,737 ($92,988 in 2025 dollars).

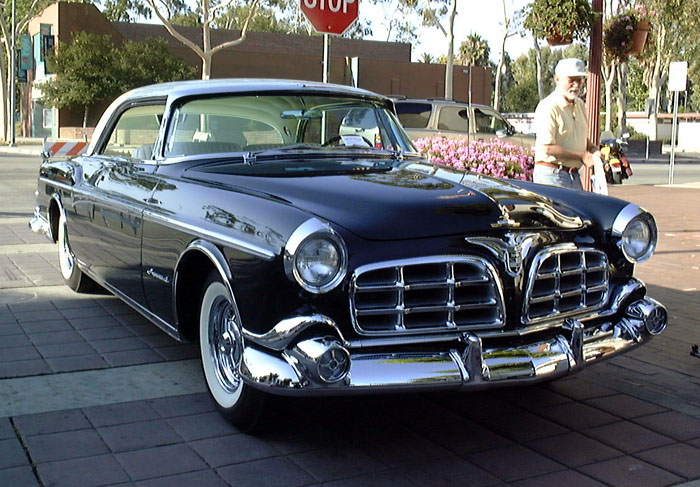
1955 Imperial 2-door hardtop coupe

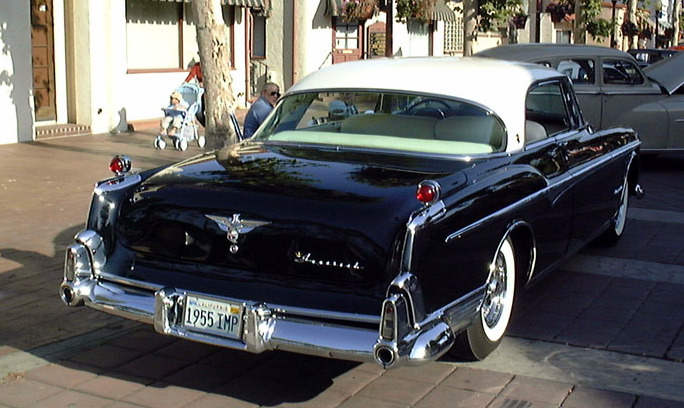
1955 Imperial 2-door hardtop coupe with rear view of free-standing "gunsight" taillights

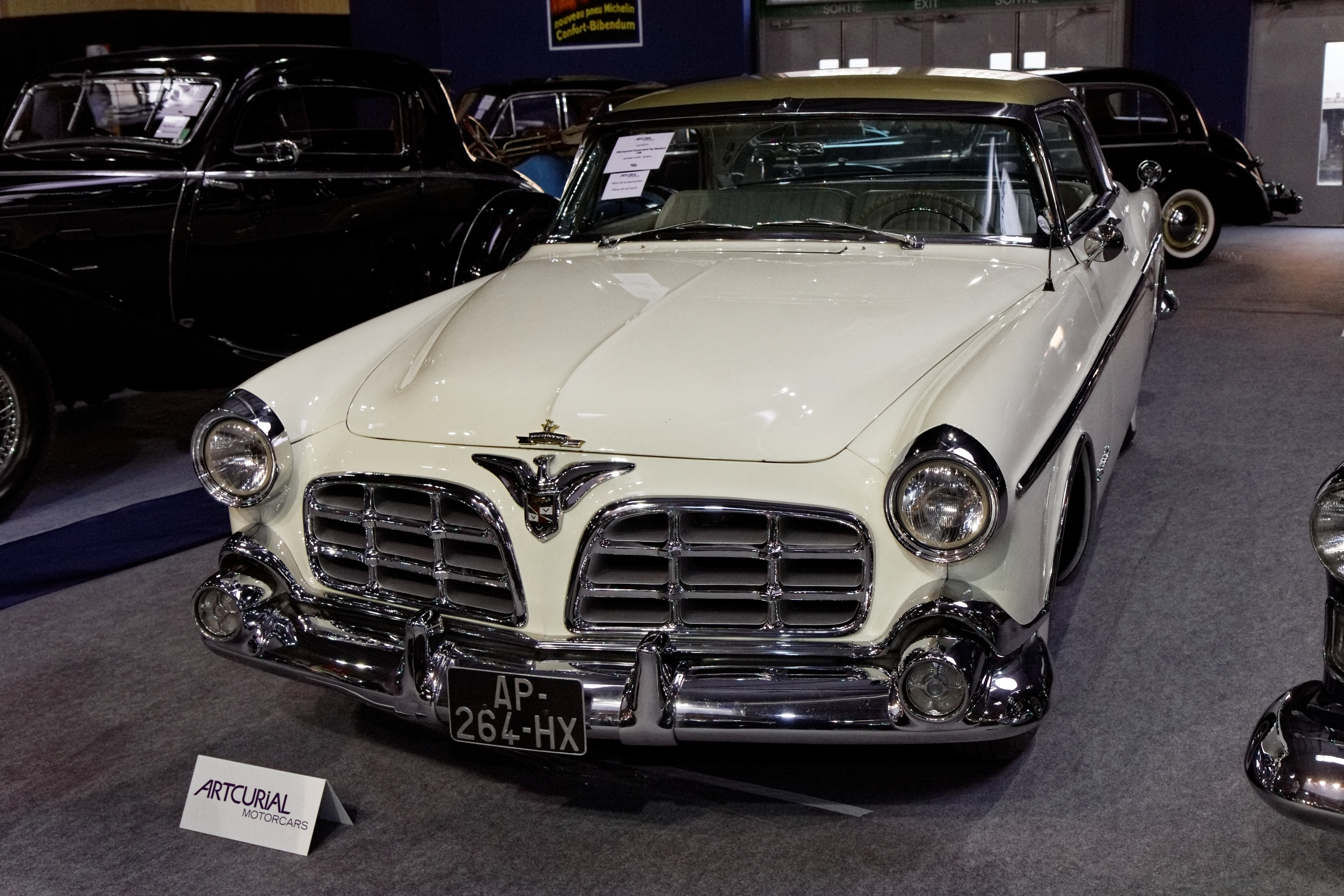
1955 Imperial hardtop Newport C69

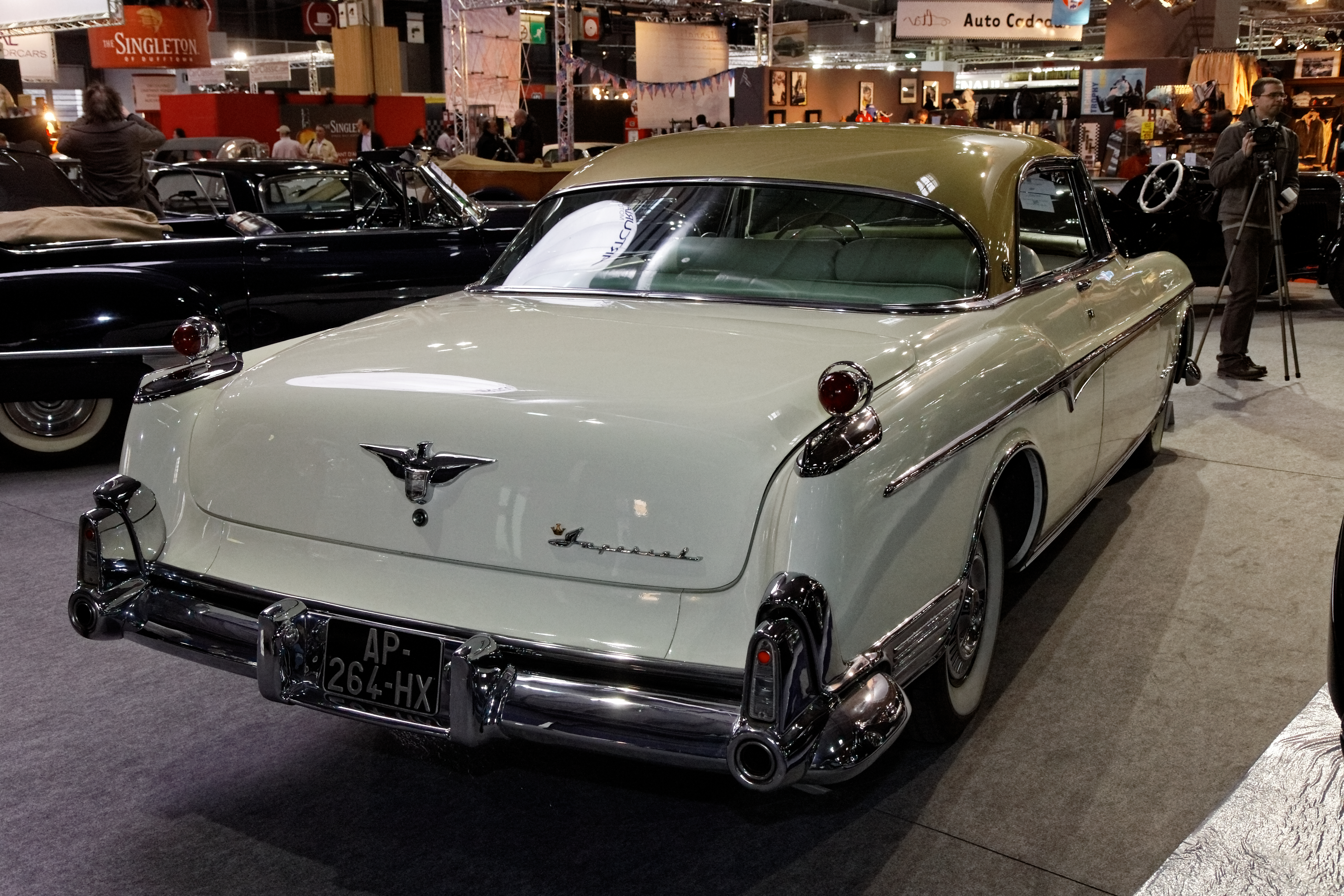
1955 Imperial hardtop Newport C69

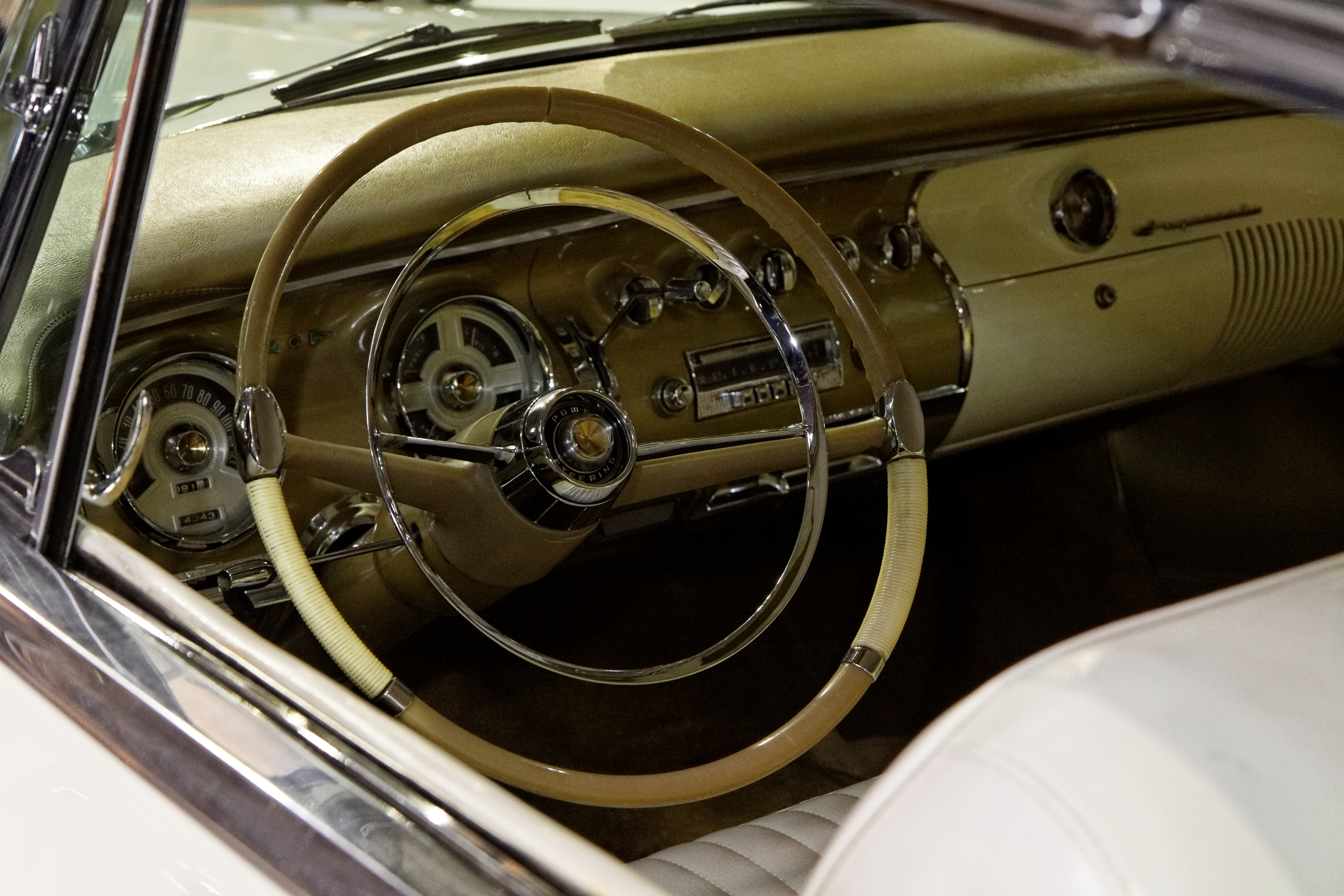
1955 Imprial hardtop Newport C69 interior

=== 1956 ===
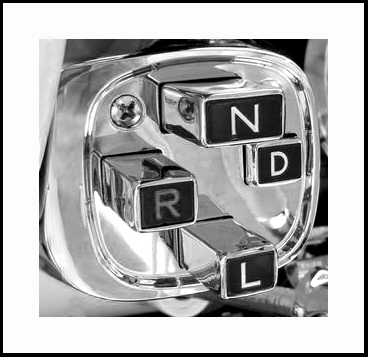
Imperial dash push-button PowerFlite transmission introduced for the 1956 models

The 1956 models were similar, but had small tailfins. The Hemi V8 was enlarged to 354 cu in (5.8 L) with 280 brake horsepower (209 kW), and a four-door Southampton hardtop sedan was added to the range. 10,268 were produced. With a wheelbase of 133.0 inches (3,378 mm), longer than the previous year's by 3.0 inches (76 mm), they had the longest wheelbase ever for an Imperial. This also contributed to an increase in their overall length to 229.6 inches (5,832 mm), making them the longest non-limousine post-WWII American cars until the advent of the Imperials of the "Fuselage Look" era in the 1970s. 1956 was the year that Chrysler introduced the push button PowerFlite automatic transmission becoming available mid-year with the control pod installed to the left of the driver; Packard also introduced a similar system called the Touchbutton Ultramatic in the Imperial's competitor, the Packard Caribbean and the Patrician. For 1957, Mercury introduced its version called "Keyboard Control" for the Merc-O-Matic, which also included a pushbutton to place the transmission in neutral so the engine could be started and a push/pull control to set the parking brake and lock the transmission in gear. The Mercury and Chrysler versions were operated mechanically while the Packard and the controversial and short lived Edsel Teletouch version used electric solenoids to change gears.

1955 Chrysler - Philco all transistor car radio - "Breaking News" radio broadcast announcement. (Optional on 1956 Imperial car models)

On April 28, 1955, Chrysler and Philco announced the development and production of the world's first all-transistor car radio, the Mopar model 914HR. It was developed and produced by Chrysler and Philco and was a $150 ($1,803 in 2025 dollars) option on 1956 Imperials. Philco manufactured the Mopar 914HR starting in the fall of 1955 at its Sandusky Ohio plant, for Chrysler.

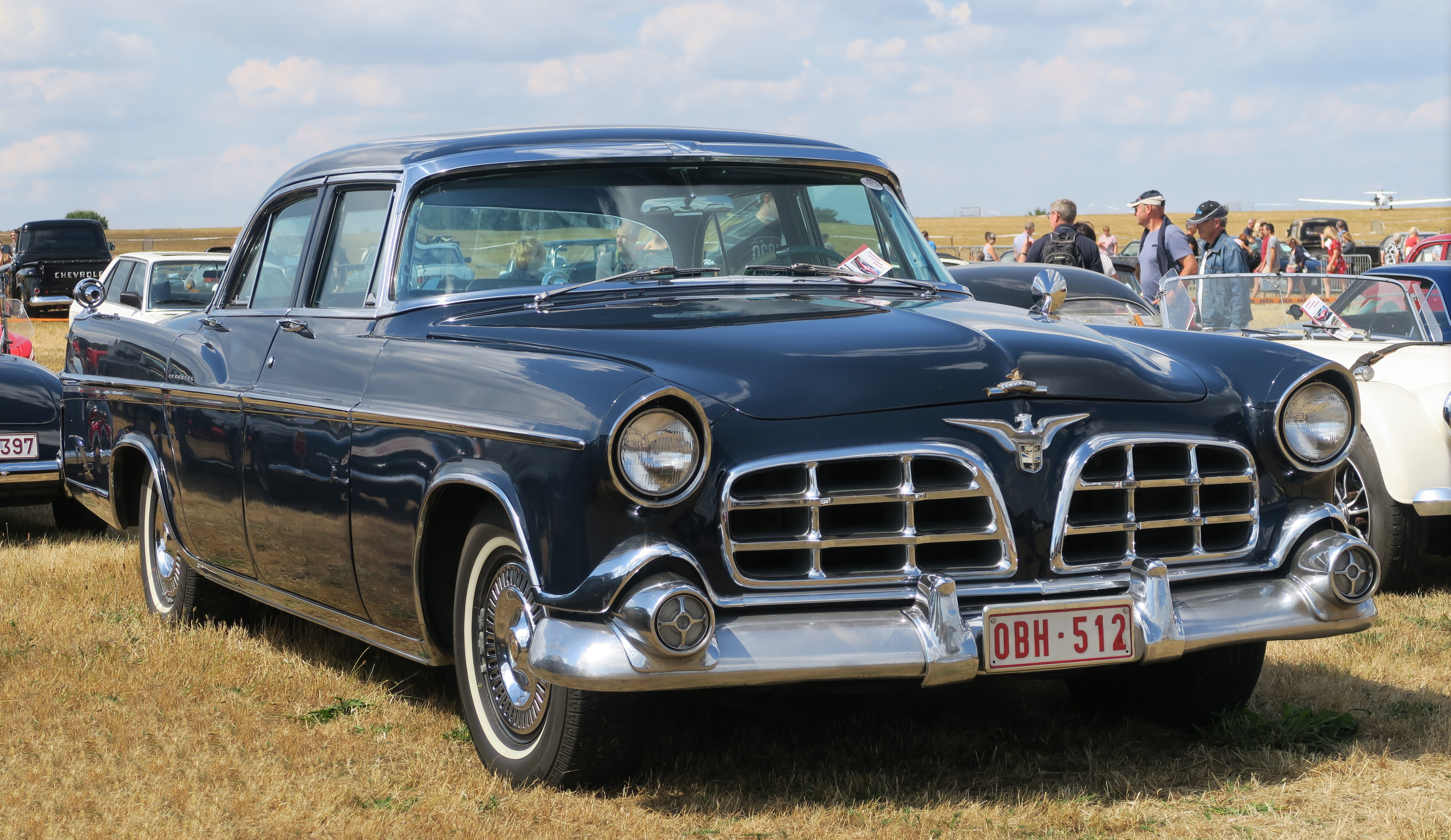
1956 Imperial Four Door Sedan

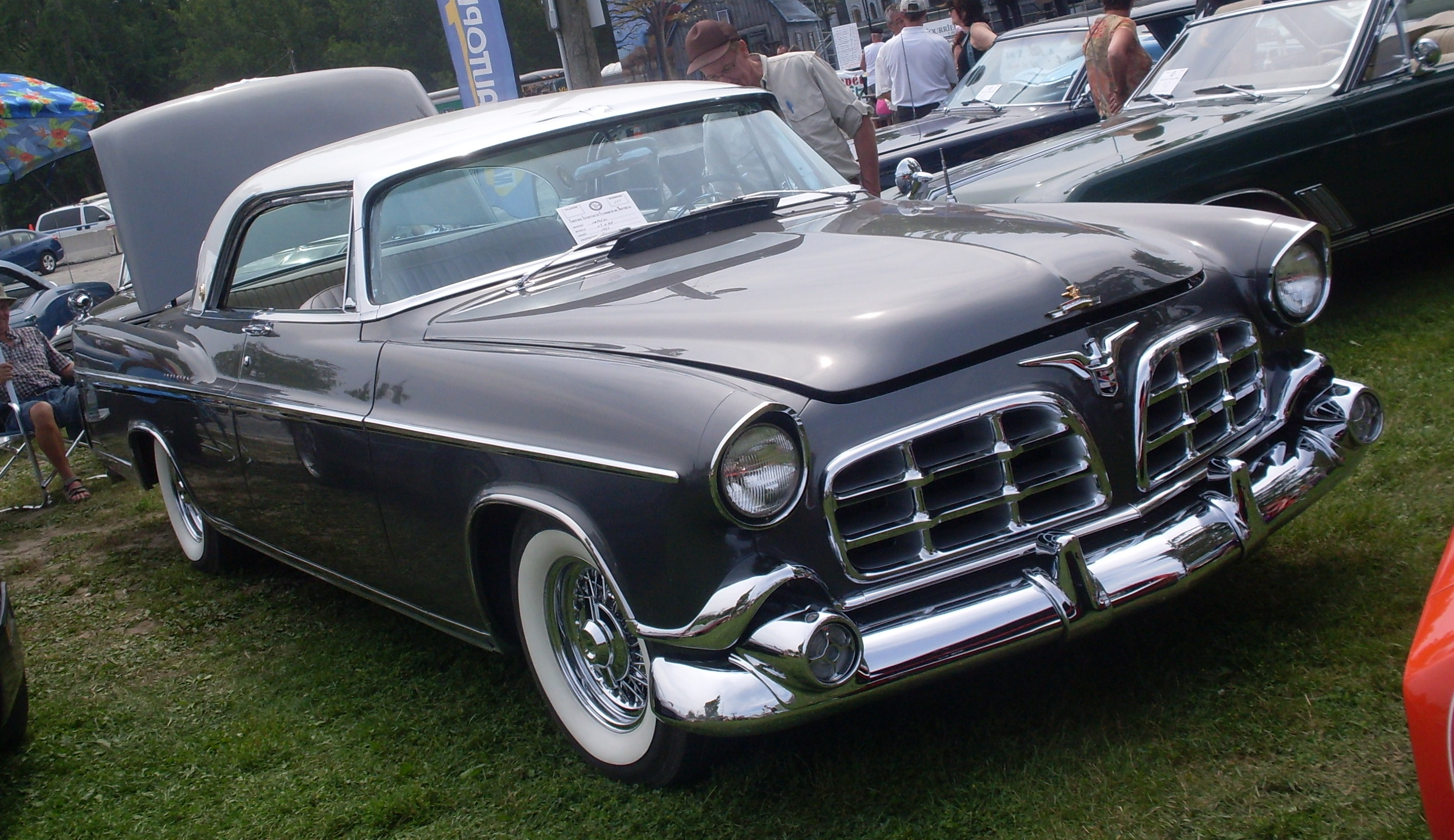
1956 Imperial two-door hardtop

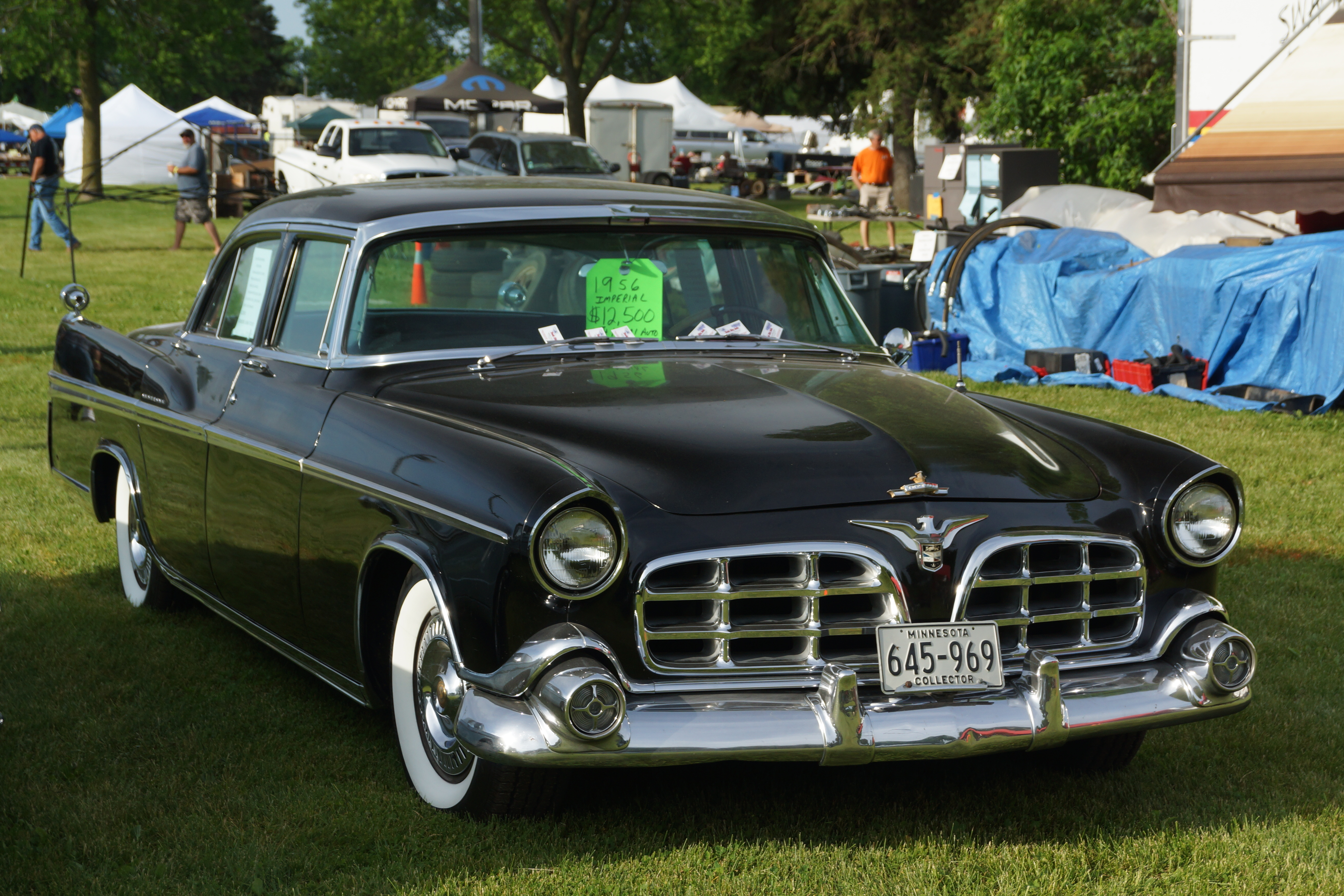
1956 Imperial four-door sedan

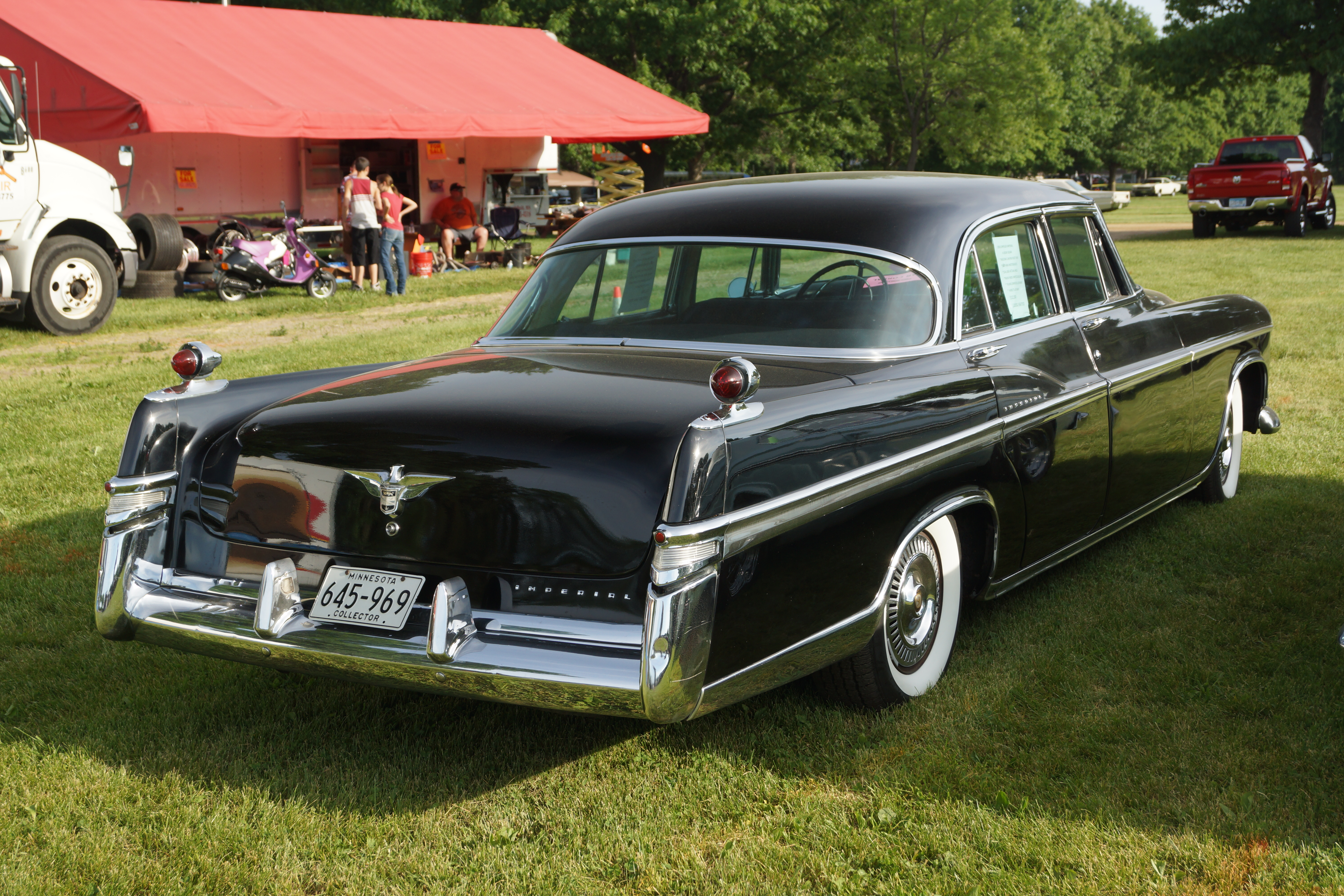
1956 Imperial four-door sedan

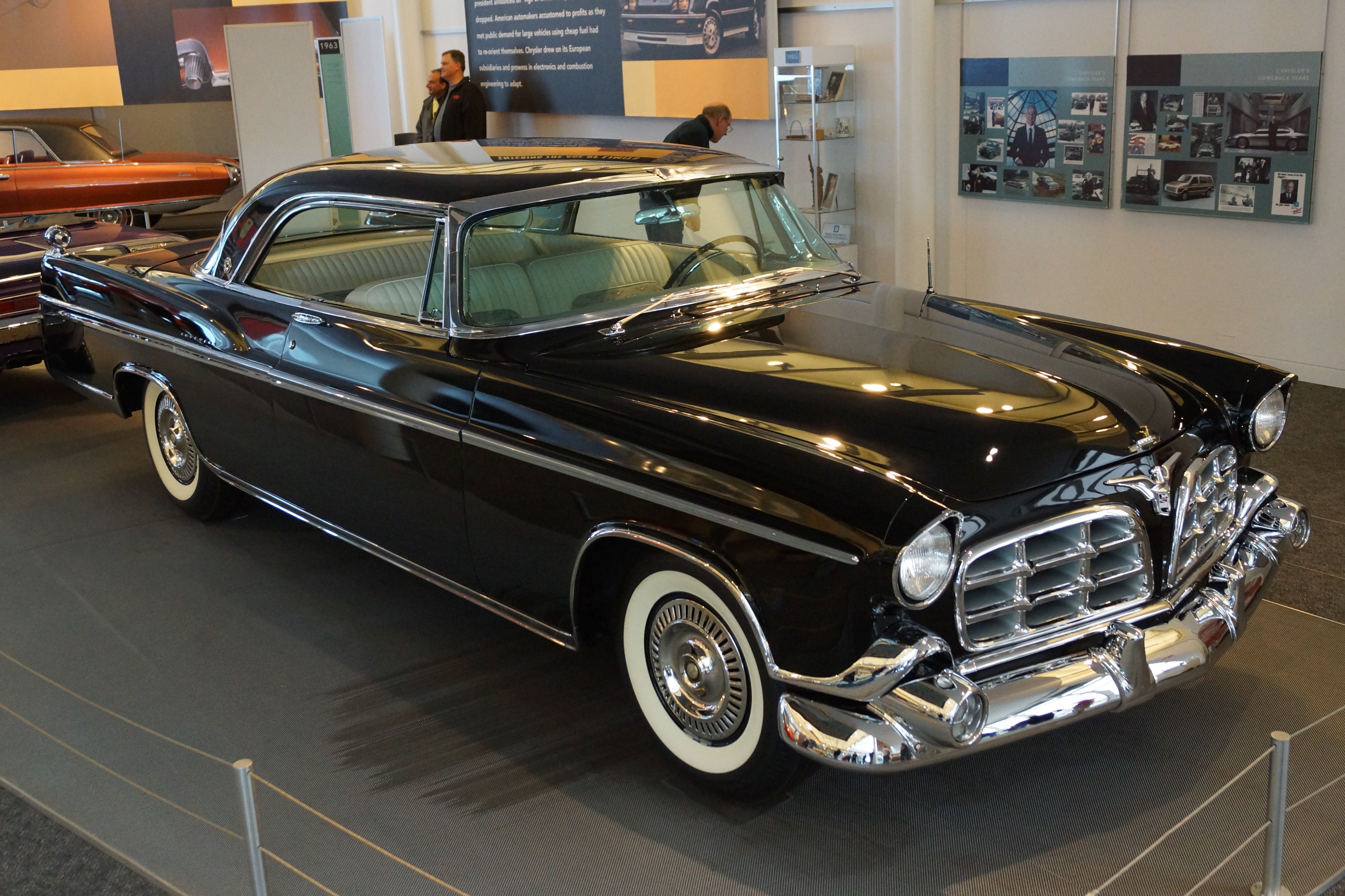
1956 Imperial Southampton two-door hardtop

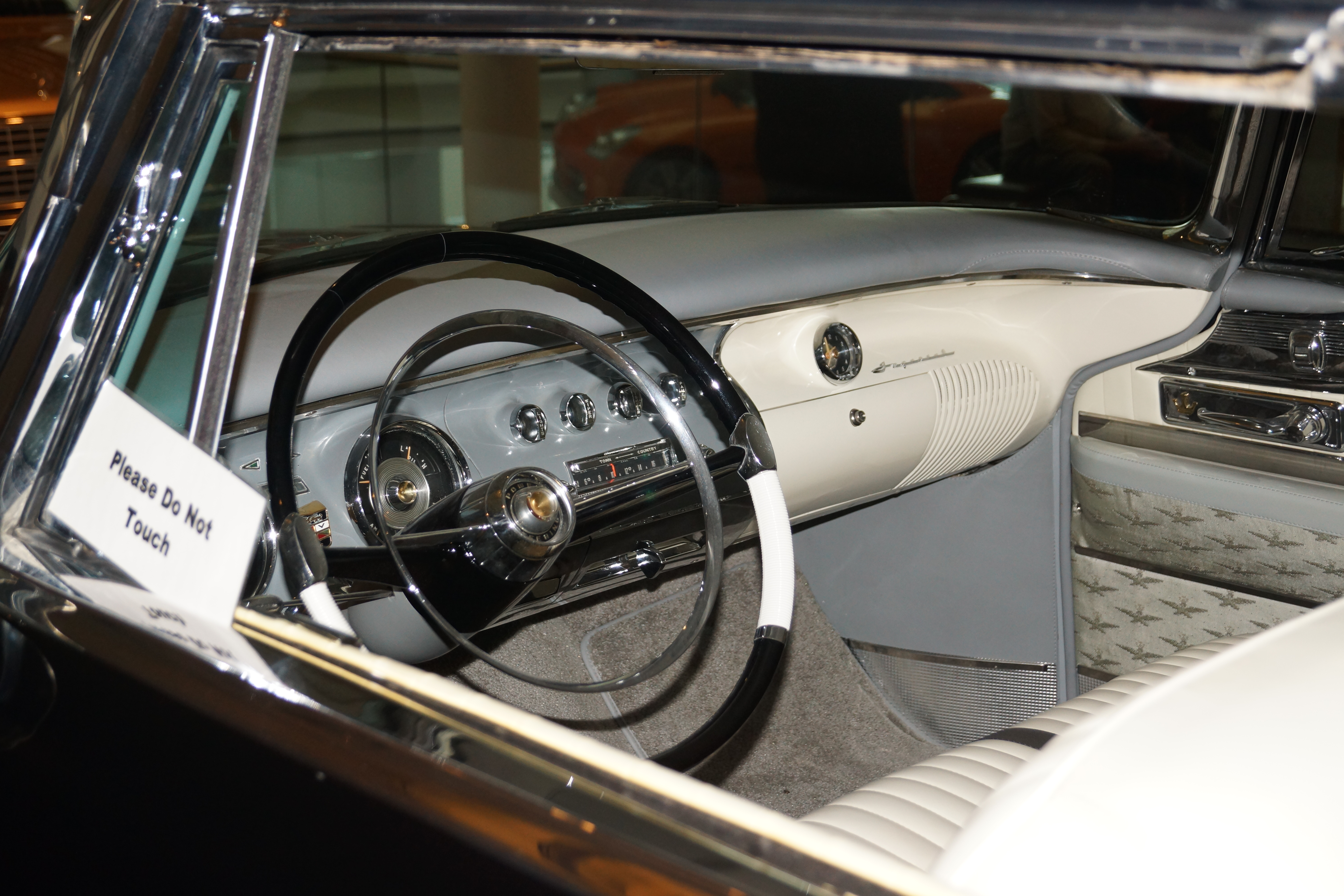
1956 Imperial Southampton interior

== Second generation (1957–1966) ==
Second generation
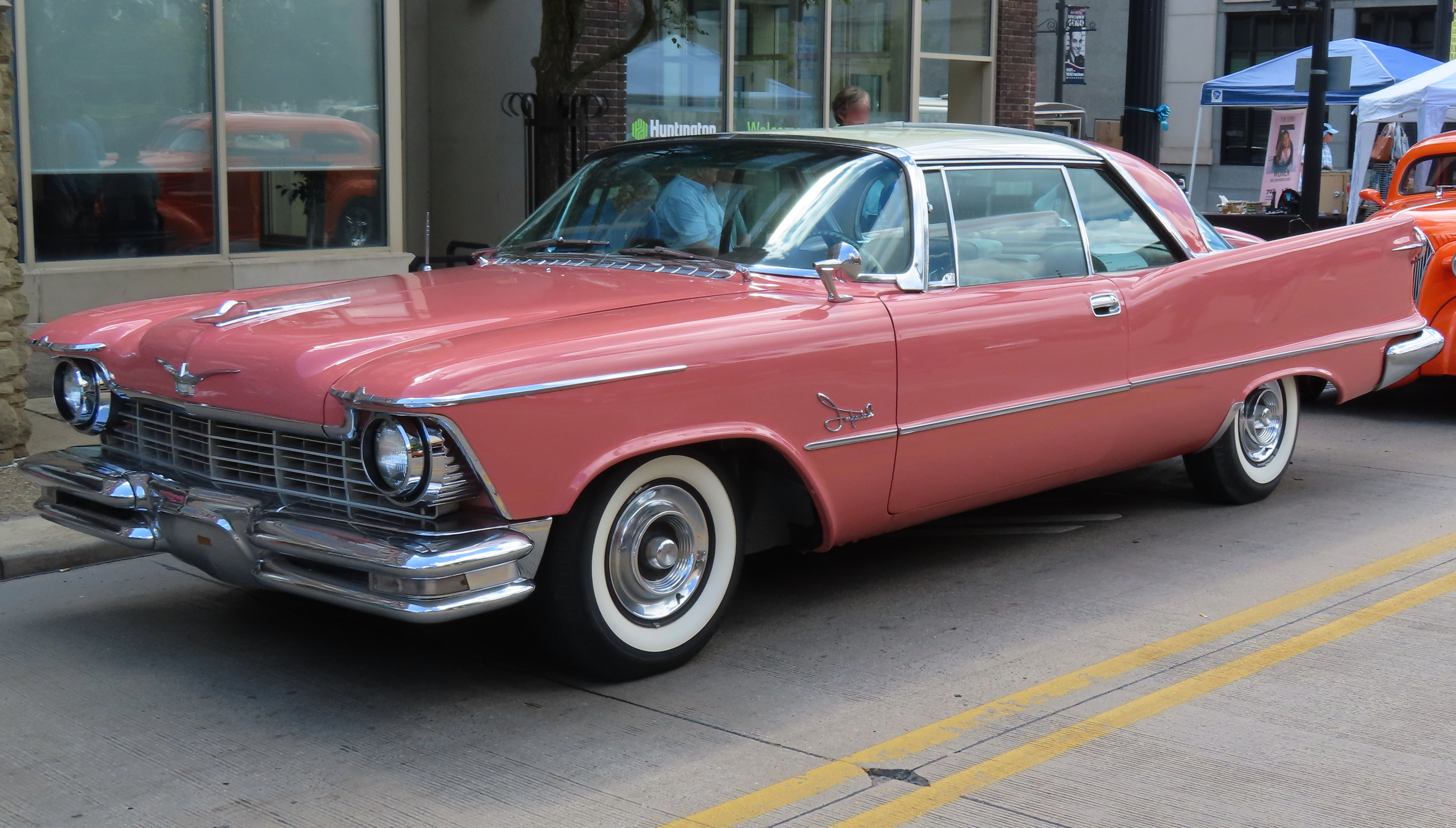
- 1957 Imperial (base) 2-door Southampton with rare single headlights

Overview
- Production: 1956–1966
- Model years: 1957–1966
- Assembly: United States: Detroit, Michigan (Jefferson Avenue Assembly: 1959–1962); United States: Detroit, Michigan (Warren Avenue Assembly)
- Designer: Virgil Exner and Elwood Engel

Body and chassis
- Body style: 2-door hardtop 2-door convertible 4-door sedan 4-door hardtop
- Platform: D-body

Powertrain
- Engine: 392 cu in (6.4 L) Hemi V8; 413 cu in (6.8 L) Wedge V8; 440 cu in (7.2 L) Wedge V8
- Transmission: 3-speed TorqueFlite A488 automatic 3-speed TorqueFlite A727 automatic

Dimensions
- Wheelbase: 129.0 in (3,277 mm)
- Length: 1957: 224.4 in (5,700 mm); 1958: 225.9 in (5,738 mm); 1959–60: 226.3 in (5,748 mm); 1961–62: 227.1 in (5,768 mm); 1963–66: 227.8 in (5,786 mm)
- Width: 1957: 81.2 in (2,062 mm); 1958: 81.3 in (2,065 mm); 1959: 81.0 in (2,057 mm); 1960: 80.1 in (2,035 mm); 1961–63: 81.7 in (2,075 mm); 1964–66: 80.0 in (2,032 mm)
- Height: 1957: 57.5 in (1,460 mm); 1958: 56.7 in (1,440 mm); 1959: 56.9 in (1,445 mm); 1960–61: 56.7 in (1,440 mm); 1962–64: 56.8 in (1,443 mm); 1965: 57.2 in (1,453 mm); 1966: 55.8 in (1,417 mm)
- Curb weight: 4,800–5,500 lb (2,200–2,500 kg)

For the 1957 model year, the Imperial received its own platform, setting it apart from any other division of Chrysler and shared the all-new "Forward Look" appearance, showing a number of styling features introduced with the concept car Chrysler Norseman. Imperials during this period were substantially wider, both inside and out, than other Chrysler Corporation products, with front and rear shoulder room equal to 64.0 in (1,626 mm) and 62.0 in (1,575 mm) respectively. The front seat shoulder room measurement remains an unsurpassed record for Imperial and would remain the record for any car until the 1971–1976 GM full-size models. Exterior width reached a maximum of 81.7 in (2,075 mm) for 1961–1963, which remains the record for the widest non-limousine American car. After Lincoln downsized for 1961, this generation of Imperial had no real competitor for the title of largest car for the remainder of its decade-long lifespan. The Imperial Crown convertible was listed at $5,598 (approximately $60,000 in 2025) and 1,167 were manufactured.

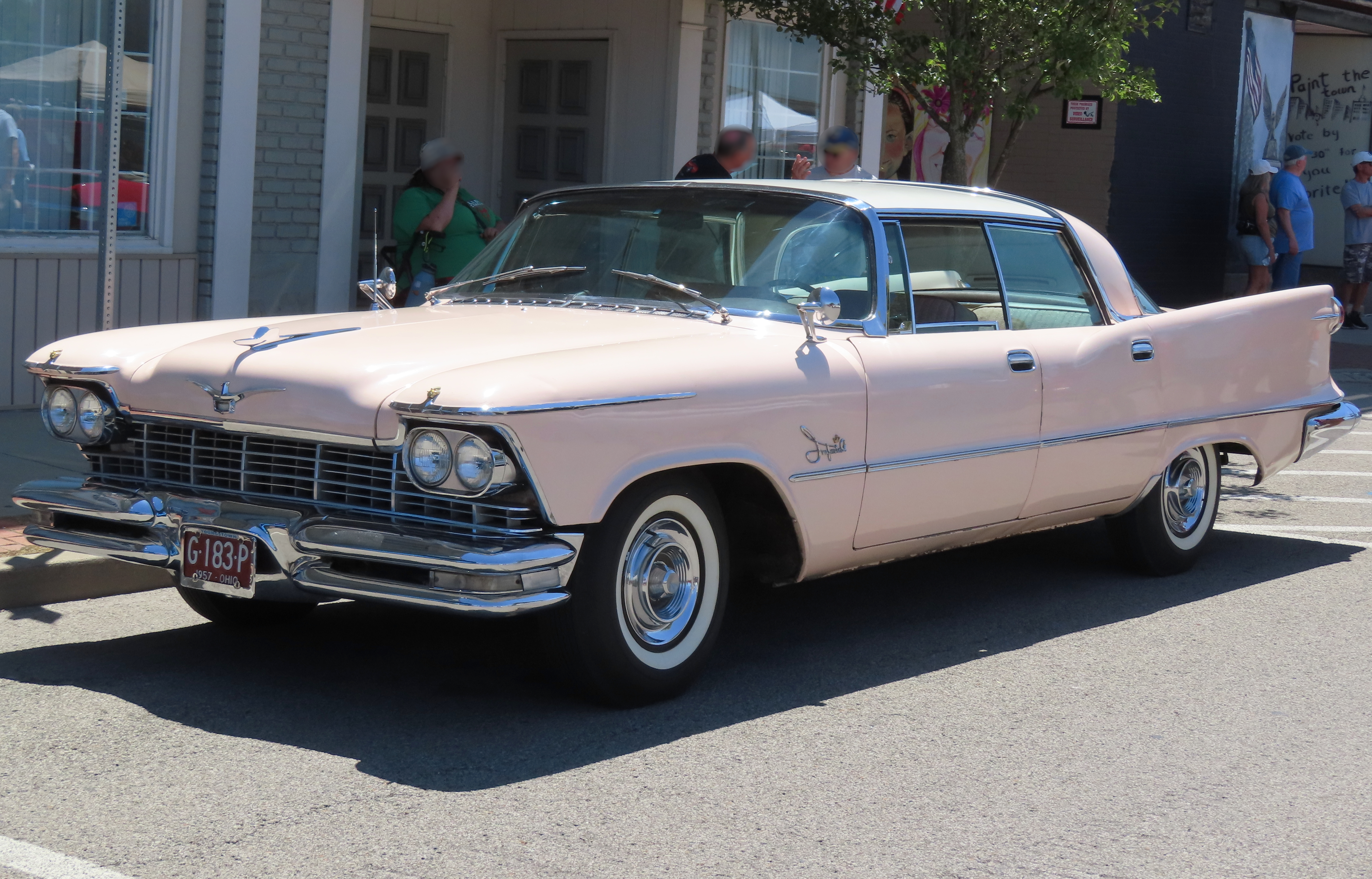
1957 Imperial Crown 4-door Southampton

Unlike the rest of the Chrysler Corporation makes (Chrysler, De Soto, Dodge, and Plymouth) that began unibody construction for 1960, the Imperial retained separate full perimeter frames for rigidity through the 1966 model year. These substantial frames had a box cross-section with strong crossmembers connecting the frame. The convertible had extra strength built into its crossmembers that formed an "X". The driveshaft passed through a hole in the "X" frame. The parking brake gripped the driveshaft and was not connected to the rear drum brakes prior to the 1963 model year.

The Imperial, and all Chrysler-built cars, incorporated "Torsion-Aire" suspension for 1957. This was an indirect-acting, torsion-bar front suspension system that reduced unsprung weight and shifted the car's center of gravity downward and rearward. Torsion-bar suspension on the front combined with multi-leaf springs on the rear provided a smoother ride and improved handling.

Imperial's handling was better than its competitors of the time due to its stiffness from the torsion-bars combined with a thick anti roll bar in the front. Pillarless hardtops, in both two and four-door configurations, received the Southampton designation.

=== 1957 (Series IMI-1, 2, 4) ===
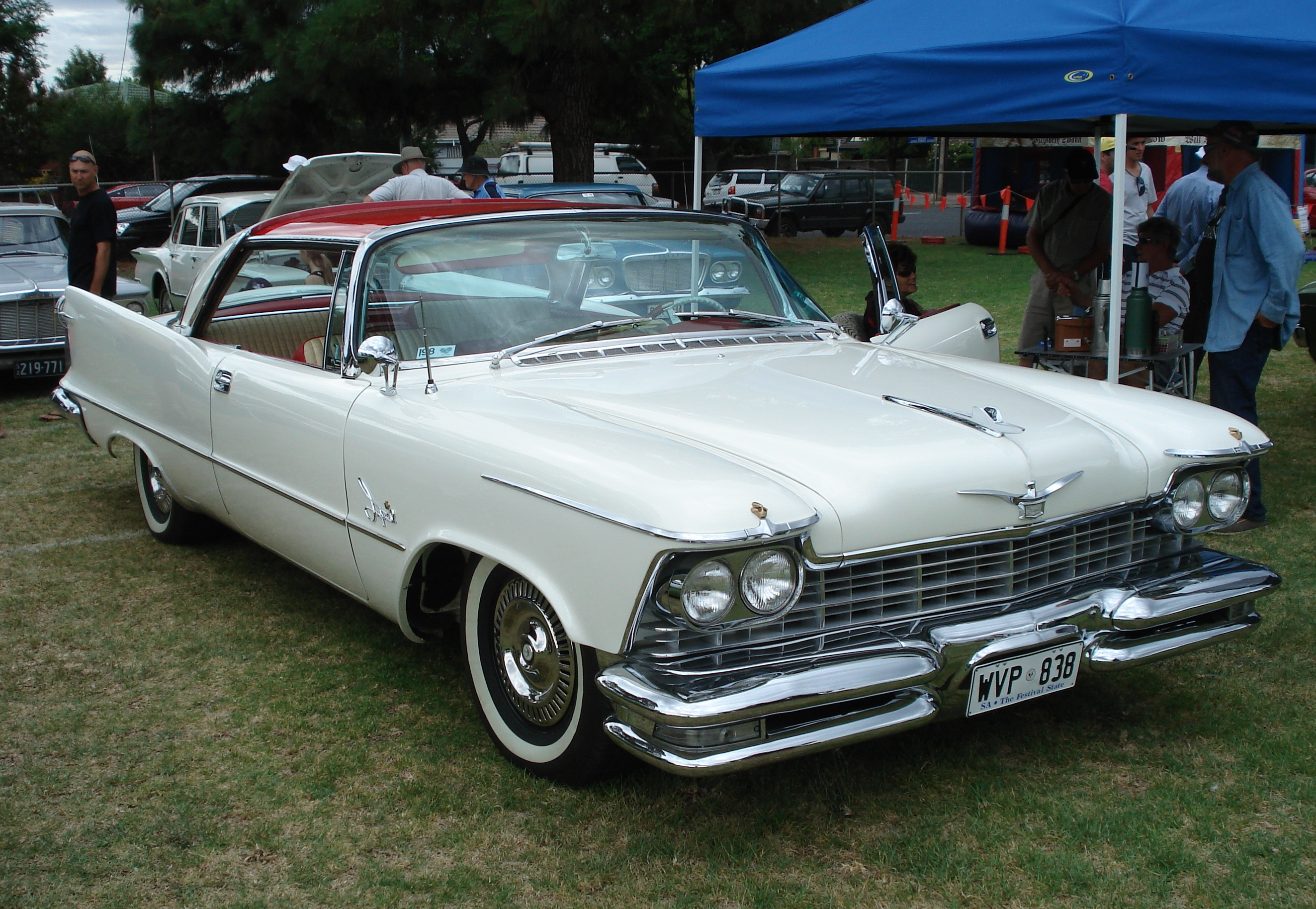
1957 Imperial Crown 2-door Southampton

The 1957 model year was based to an even greater degree on Virgil Exner's "Forward Look" styling (also used on other full-size Chryslers of the period). It featured a "biplane" front bumper, a full-width egg-crate grille, and quad headlights (where legal). Taller tailfins now encompassed the trademark gunsight taillights and framed a downward tapering decklid that met the rear bumper. Curved side glass was employed for the first time in a U.S. production car. The Hemi engine with a displacement enlarged to 392 cu in (6.4 L) was standard for 1957-58. Power seats and dual exhaust were made standard across the line. A convertible was available for the first time on an Imperial and only offered in the mid-range Crown series. Sales were helped by Exner's "ahead of the competition" styling, with 1957 becoming the best-selling Imperial model year ever: 37,593 were produced; the more commonly available Cadillac sold over 120,000 cars in 1957.

Cadillac was shocked by the new popular design from Chrysler. Cadillac retaliated by implementing training to its sales force to call Imperial a Chrysler Imperial to try to dampen the sales of its competitor. This tactic was to create the thought that you were buying an over priced Chrysler.

Quality control also slipped considerably, a consequence of the second total redesign in two years. Failing torsion-bars that were made incorrectly was also a problem from being produced too quickly.

Starting in the 1957 model year, Imperials were available in three levels of trim: standard Imperial, mid-range Imperial Crown, and the new top-of-the-line Imperial LeBaron (a reference to LeBaron, Carrossiers). The custom-built Imperial Crown limousine was also offered. Through the late 1950s and into the early 1960s styling would continue to become "Longer, Lower, Wider", with the addition of some of the wildest fins on a car. The "FliteSweep Deck Lid", a simulated Continental tire bulge, was an option for 1957 through 1961 and again in 1963. It was shared with contemporary Mopars, including the Valiant. Exner's design extended to early-fifties concept cars like the 1953 Chrysler D'Elegance.

=== 1958 (Series LY1-L, M, H) ===
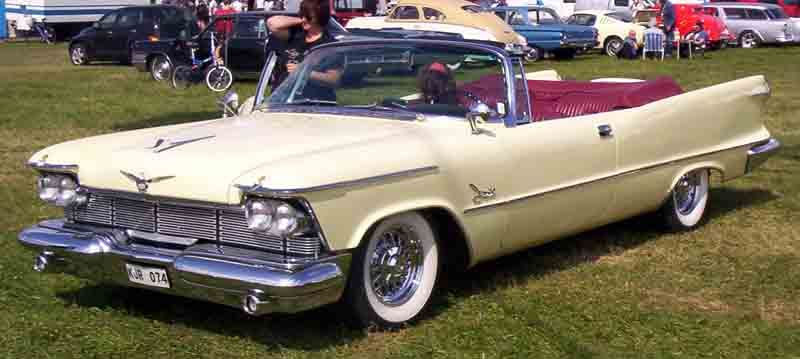
1958 Imperial Crown convertible

Styling changes for 1958 were limited to the front grille and bumper. Quad headlights became standard. The 1958 Imperial is credited with the introduction of cruise control, which was called "Auto-Pilot", and was available on the Imperial, and on Chrysler New Yorker, 300, Saratoga and Windsor models. Power door locks were another new option. Sales slipped to 16,133 in a recession year. Dealers were frustrated with buyers referring to the cars as a Chrysler Imperial, which impacted sales as Imperial was not seen as having Cadillac's or Lincoln's prestige. It didn't help that Imperial continued to be sold at Chrysler dealerships, instead of standalone dealers, although it did have a separate Imperial dealership sign.

=== 1959 (Series MY1-L, M, H) ===
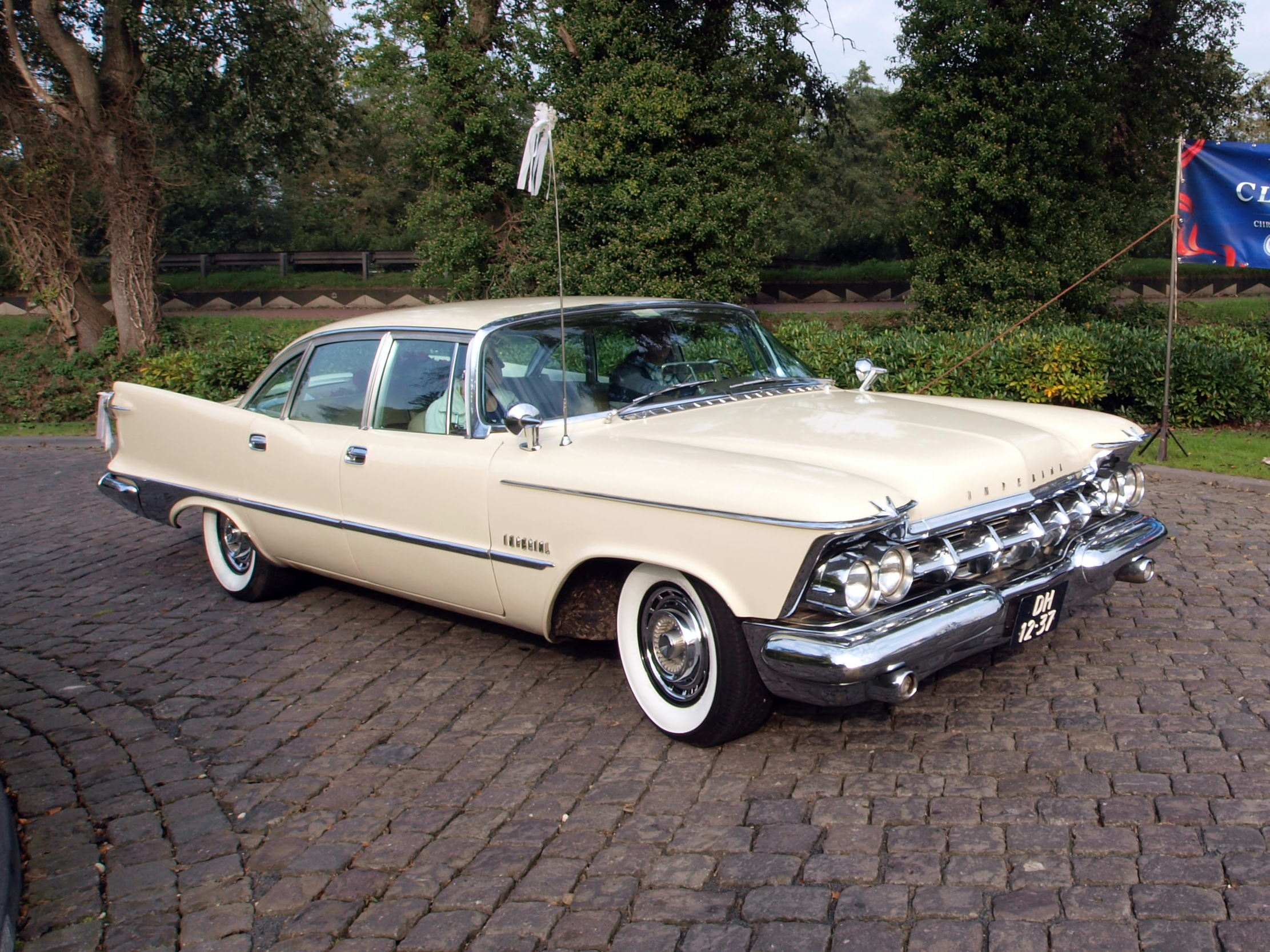
1959 Imperial Custom Sedan

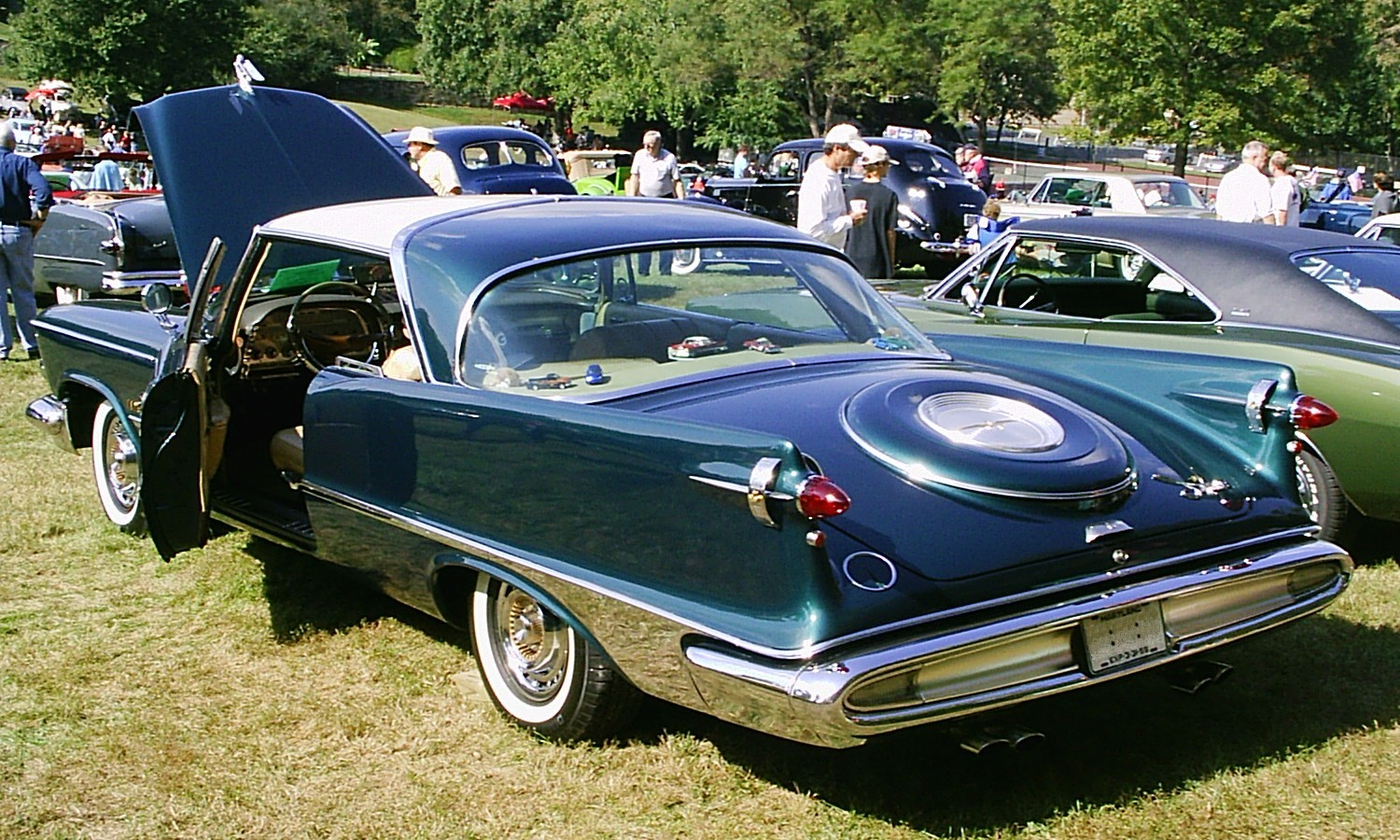
1959 Imperial Crown Southampton hardtop coupe with view of FliteSweep deck lid

Production was moved from the traditional Jefferson Avenue Assembly plant in Detroit to an exclusive facility on Warren Avenue, north of the Jefferson Avenue factory. Other than a toothy new grille and revisions to side trim little changed in terms of exterior styling for the 1959 model year. A new option was the Silvercrest roof which featured a stainless steel front with a rear canopy that could be ordered either in any of the basic car colors or in the Landau version which had a black canopy with the appearance of leather. The previously unnamed standard Imperial model gained the Imperial Custom name this year.

A new option for 1959 was Swivel Seats (with 6-way power). With this extra cost option the front seats could be swiveled 40 degrees outward using a release lever on the side of the seat bottom. When swiveled back to the forward facing position the seat would re-latch automatically. This was a separate, extra cost option versus the regular 6-way power seat that was optional on the Custom model but standard for Crown and LeBaron.

The Hemi was replaced with the less expensive 413 cu in (6.8 L) "wedge"-head V8 that nevertheless had more horsepower and weighed 101 lbs less, improving the power-to-weight ratio. For the model year 17,710 Imperials were produced, ahead of Lincoln, as the Packard luxury brand withdrew from the marketplace. The few Ghia-built 1959 Imperial Crown limousines continued to use the 392 cubic-inch Hemi, due to slow production. These cars got the 413 engine for 1960.

=== 1960 (Series PY1-L, M, H) ===
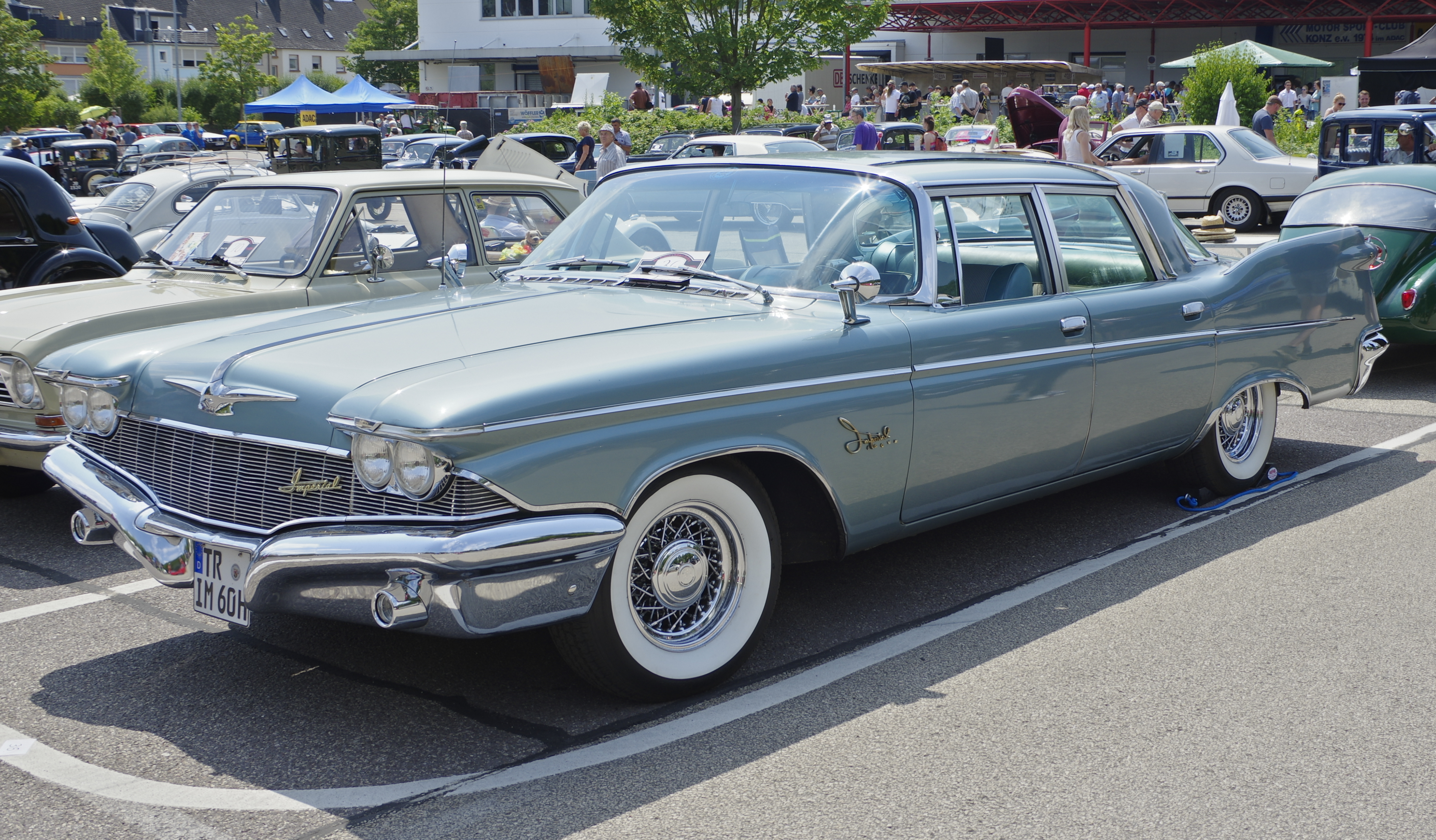
1960 Imperial Crown sedan

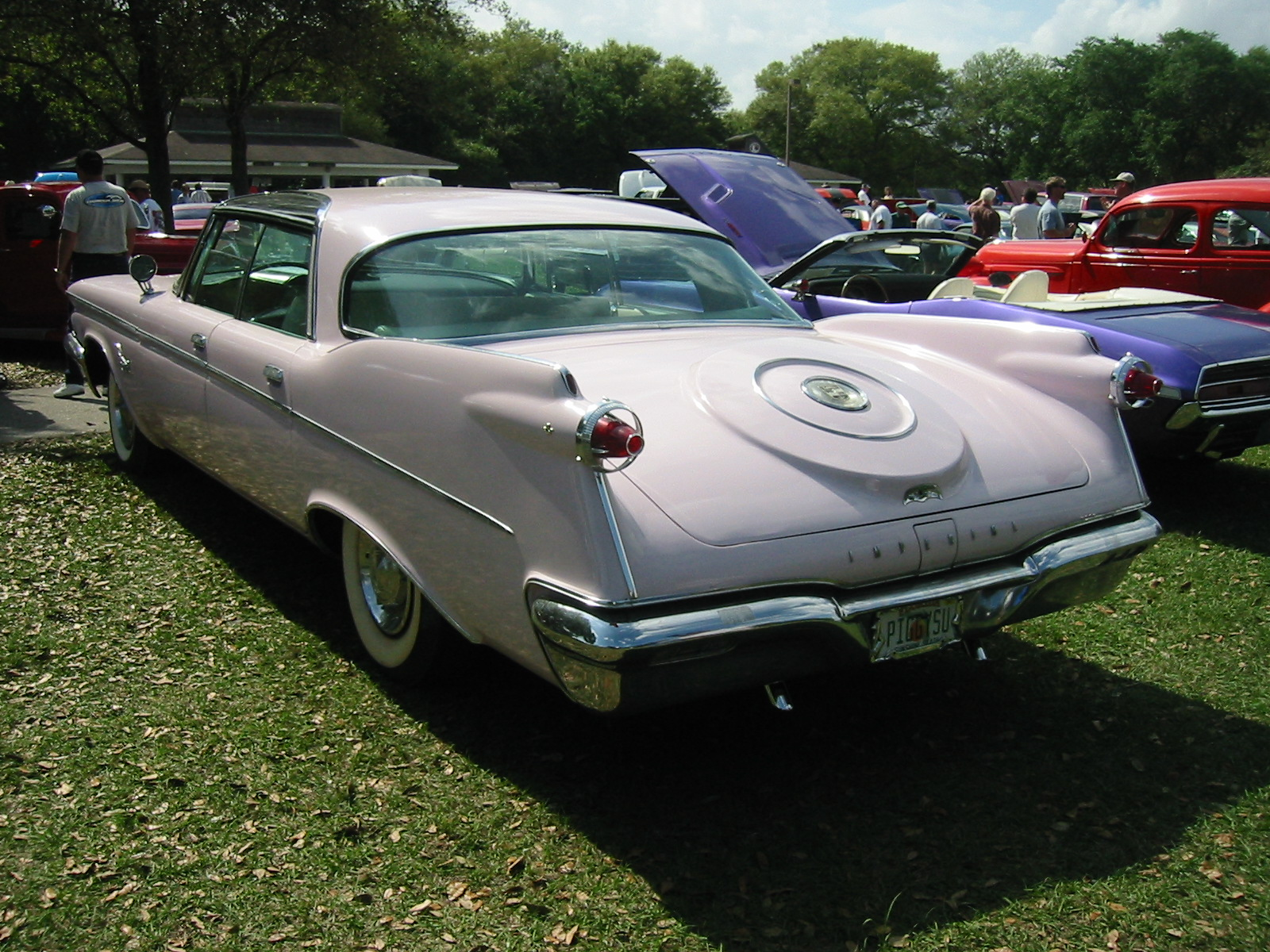
1960 Imperial Crown Southampton 4-door hardtop

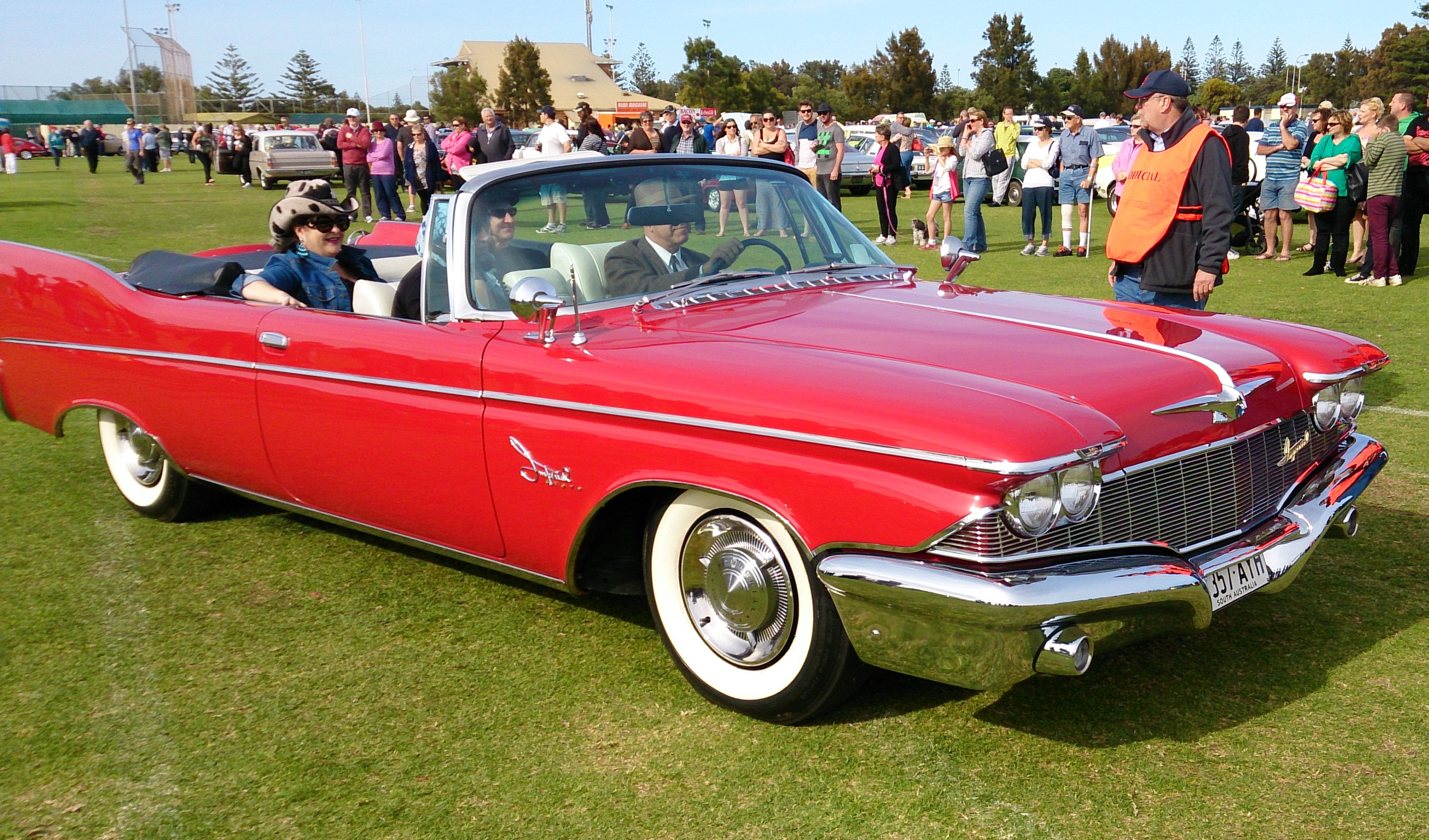
1960 Imperial Crown convertible

The 1960 Imperial adopted wildly exaggerated styling, featuring front fascia with a swooping bumper, gaping mesh grille, giant chrome eagle, and hooded quad headlights, and tall rear fins. Soaring fins had bullet-style tail lamps at the peak of the fin, with a chrome ring surrounding it. The grille and bumper on the front of the 1960 used large pieces of heavy chrome, and the 'furrowed brows' of the fenders over the double sets of headlights gave the car a ponderous look. In common with most other 1960 Chrysler products, the Imperial featured the new "High-Tower" seat with the driver-side back individually contoured and raised above of the rest of the front seat for increased driver comfort and shoulder support. This would last through the 1962 model year. Also for 1960, Imperial changed back to 15-inch wheels from the 14-inch wheels that had been standard since the 1957 model. Imperial LeBarons now featured a distinctive smaller "formal rear window" for greater rear-seat privacy. Sales increased to 17,719. Imperial again finished ahead of Lincoln, but never did so again. While the rest of Chrysler's lineup adopted unibody construction, Imperial retained its body on frame construction.

The Swivel Seat option became "Automatic" for 1960 by adding hidden cables to the door hinges and additional helper springs to the previous design. The cable triggered stronger helper springs to automatically swivel the seat outward or latch it back in as the corresponding door was opened or closed. This resolved a previous issue with the manual swivel release handle sometimes hitting/damaging the door panel if the door was closed with the seat still swiveled out. It was discontinued by Chrysler Corp. within the first few months. The cables were deleted leaving the manual release handles as the only remaining operation method for the rest of 1960 and all of 1961. Although the specific reason is not clearly documented, some assume this was for safety reasons due to an increased risk of falling out of the vehicle if a door came open at speed or during an accident.

The design of the 1960–1963 period had elicited some controversy. At that time, Exner was increasingly struggling with the Chrysler president and board. "It was during 1962 Exner was dethroned as president of design in Highland Park. His successor was Elwood Engel, lured away from Ford to lead Chrysler Corporation along a more conventional path. Exner continued as a consultant through 1964, after which he had no further involvement." This source also states, "When he was good, he was very good ( re: styling). When he was bad.... it was the epitome of excessive design. Sales dropped off and the board stepped in." Exner's son went on further, in a 1976 interview, "it was time for a change. Their image needed changing. Dad was a great designer and he was always ahead of his time. He gained more freedom from Chrysler in his designs of the modern Stutz." This same source gives accounts of how Chrysler Corporation was revived through corporate changes in leadership. "But on the product front, the influence of Tex Colbert (ousted President of Chrysler in 1961) and Virgil Exner was still present, and it wouldn't be entirely washed away until 1965".

Despite the annual styling changes, all 1960-63 models featured a similar space age dashboard. The steering wheel was squared-off at top and bottom, designed for better legroom and view through the windshield in the straight-ahead position. Dashboard lighting was electroluminescent : electricity running through a five-layer laminate caused the phosphorescent ceramic layer to glow in the dark. Chrysler called it "Panelescent", and it was shared on some Chrysler models. The effect was eerie and surprisingly modern, with its glowing blue-green face, bright red needles, and extremely faint hum. The 61-63 dash lighting used no incandescent bulbs, although 2 bulbs did illuminate the shifter and HVAC buttons in 1960. The 1960-63 models were also united by a distinctive side trim that started above the headlights and that ran at a slight downward angle almost to the end of the rear fender (except in 1963 when it would actually wrap all the way around the rear of the car) that was undercut by a slight indent in the sides from the front until just before the rear wheel housing.

A significant change in the car's proportions had occurred between the 1959 and 1960 model years. Although, at 226.3 inches, the 1960 Imperials were exactly the same length as the previous year, the whole body had been shifted forward, with a 2.1 inch reduction in the rear overhang, and a corresponding increase at the front.

=== 1961 (Series RY1-L, M, H) ===
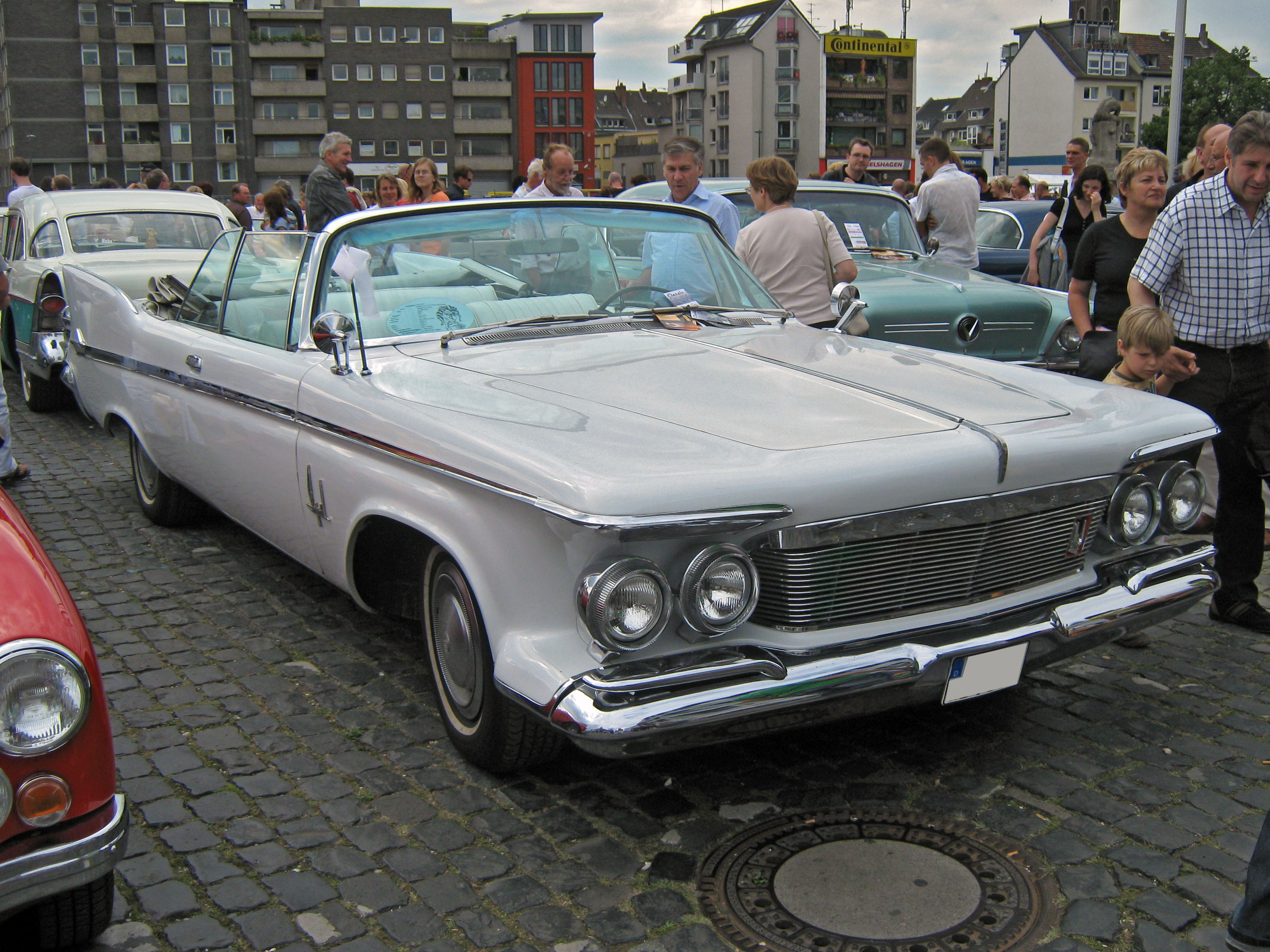
1961 Imperial Crown convertible with view of free-standing headlights

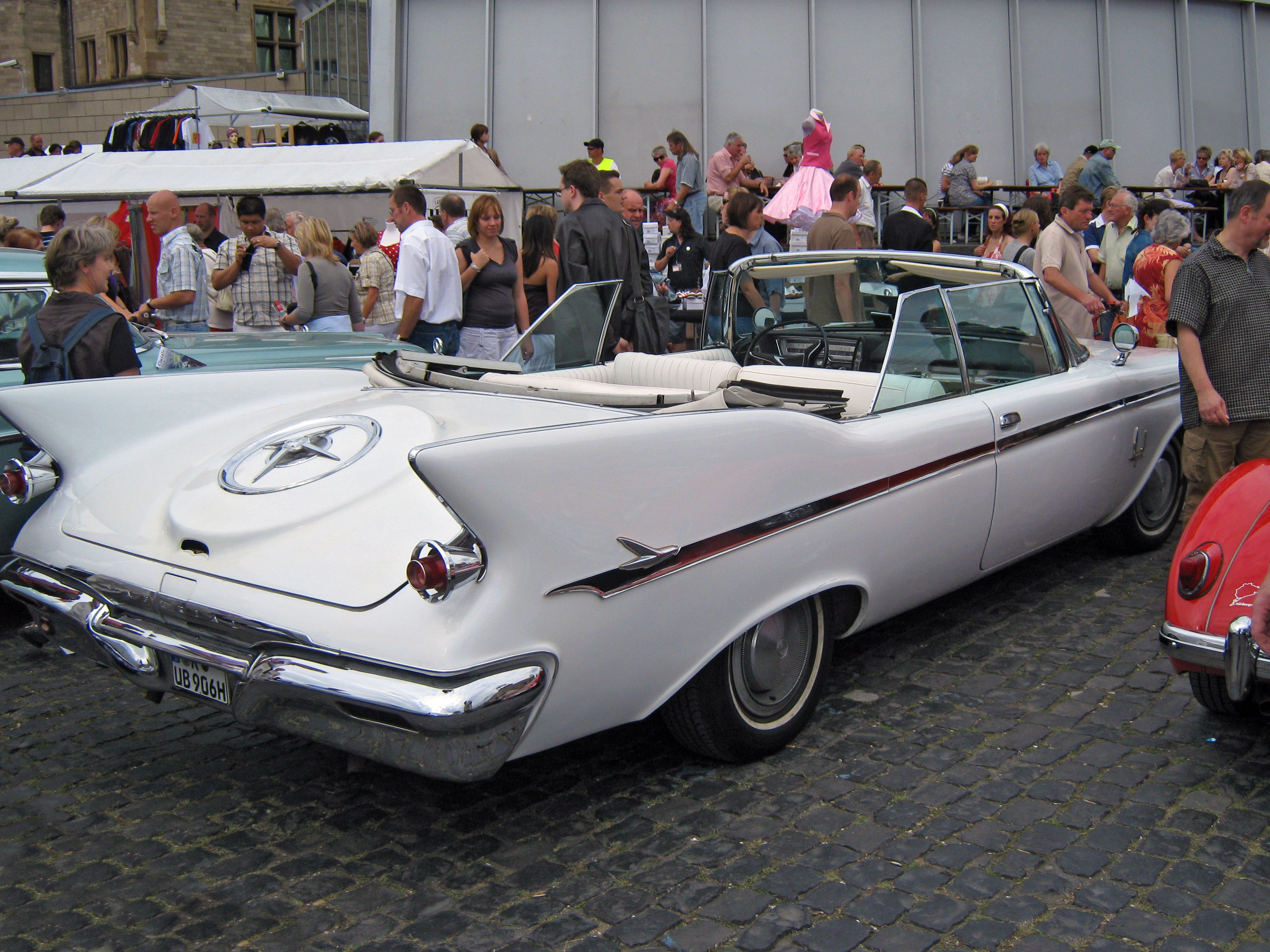
1961 Imperial Crown convertible

The 1961 model year brought a new front end design with free-standing headlights on short stalks in cut-away front fenders (a classical throwback favored by Virgil Exner, used commonly in the 1930s Chryslers. He would continue his look with the modern Stutz), and the largest tailfins ever. Inside, the Imperial gained an improved dash layout with an upright rectangular bank of gauges. The pillared four-door sedan was canceled and would not return until the 1967 model year. With the downsizing of Lincoln, at 227.1 inches (later increased to 227.8 inches in 1963), the Imperial would once again be the longest non-limousine car made in America through 1966. Sales fell to 12,258, the result of bizarre styling and continued poor quality control while the retail price for the LeBaron was US$6,428 ($69,255 in 2025 dollars).

=== 1962 (Series SY1-L, M, H) ===
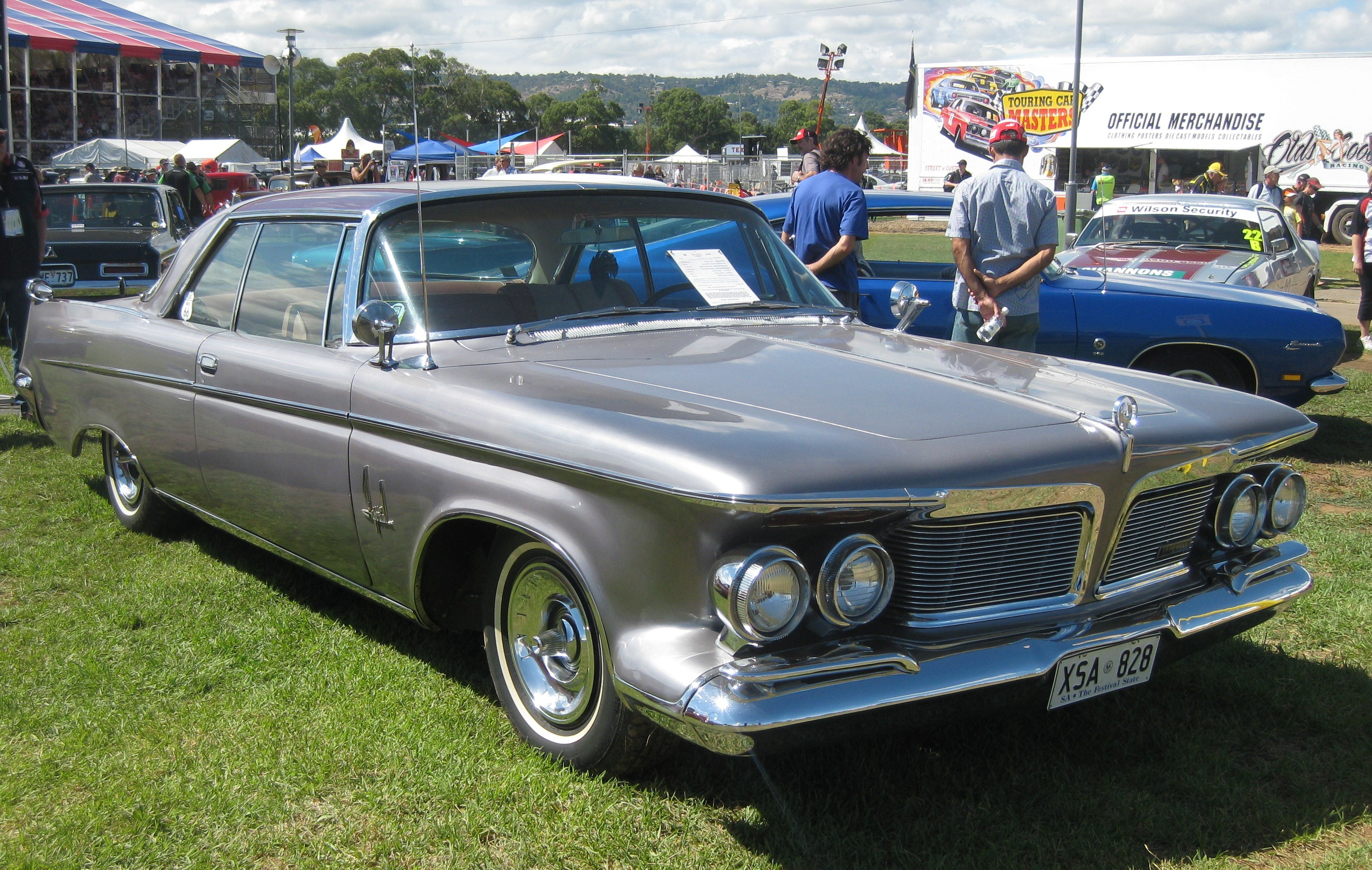
1962 Imperial Custom Southampton two-door

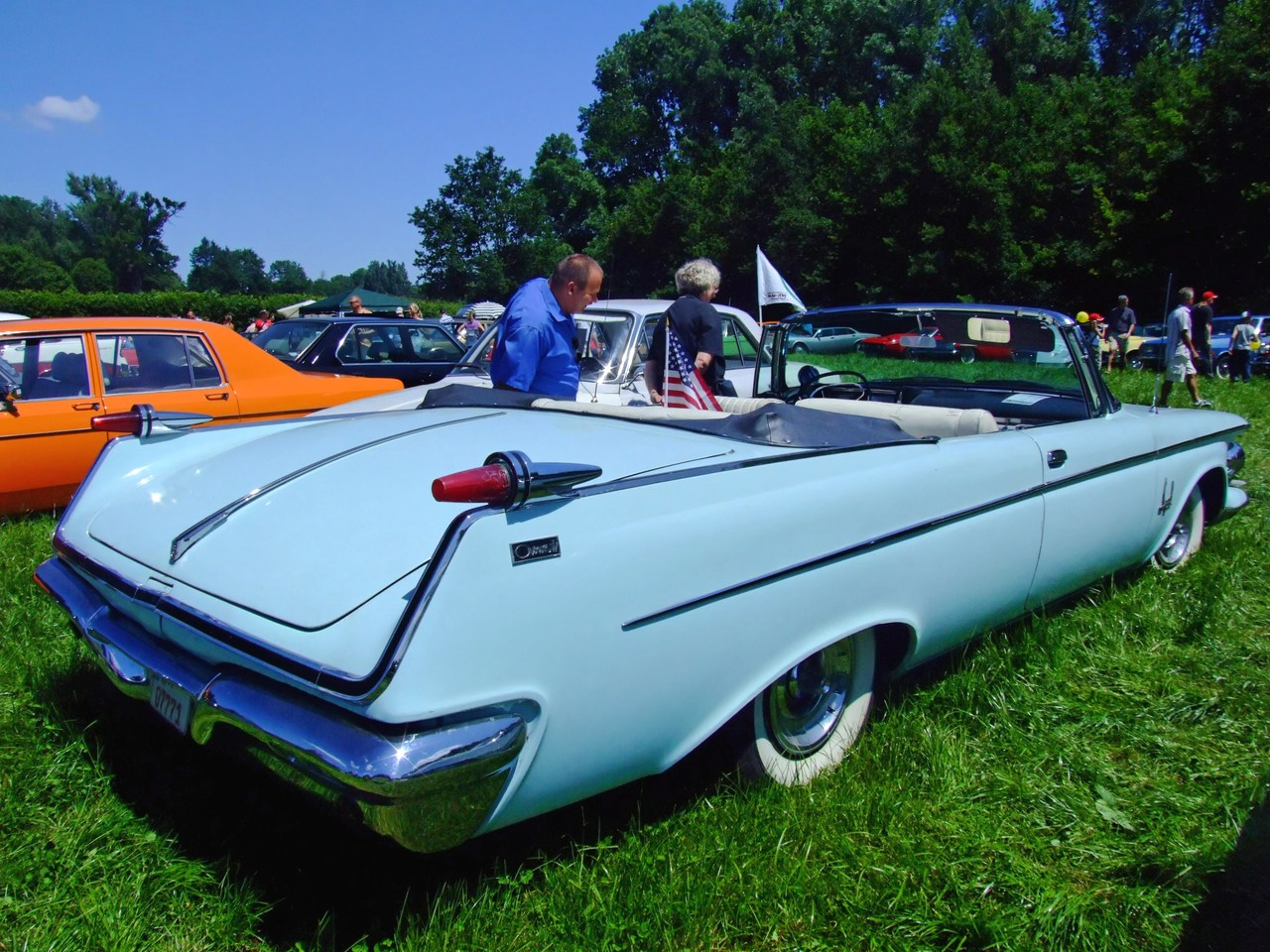
1962 Imperial Crown convertible

The tailfins were largely truncated in 1962, topped with free-standing gunsight taillights, but these were elongated and streamlined. The front grille was split, as was on the 1955 and 1956 models, and a large round eagle hood ornament was fitted for the first time. The 1962 models had a new, slimmer TorqueFlite A727 automatic transmission, which allowed a smaller transmission "hump" in the floor. This provided greater comfort for middle front-seat passengers. Dual exhaust were only standard on convertibles. 1962 also marked the closing of Imperial's dedicated assembly plant. All later Imperials were once again built in the same Jefferson Avenue facilities in Detroit as Chryslers, as sales were insufficient to maintain a separate facility. 1962 production totaled 14,337. Shortly before leaving Chrysler, Virgil Exner had planned for a smaller Imperial to go along with the downsized 1962 Mopars, but the idea never went anywhere.

=== 1963 (Series TY1-L, M, H) ===
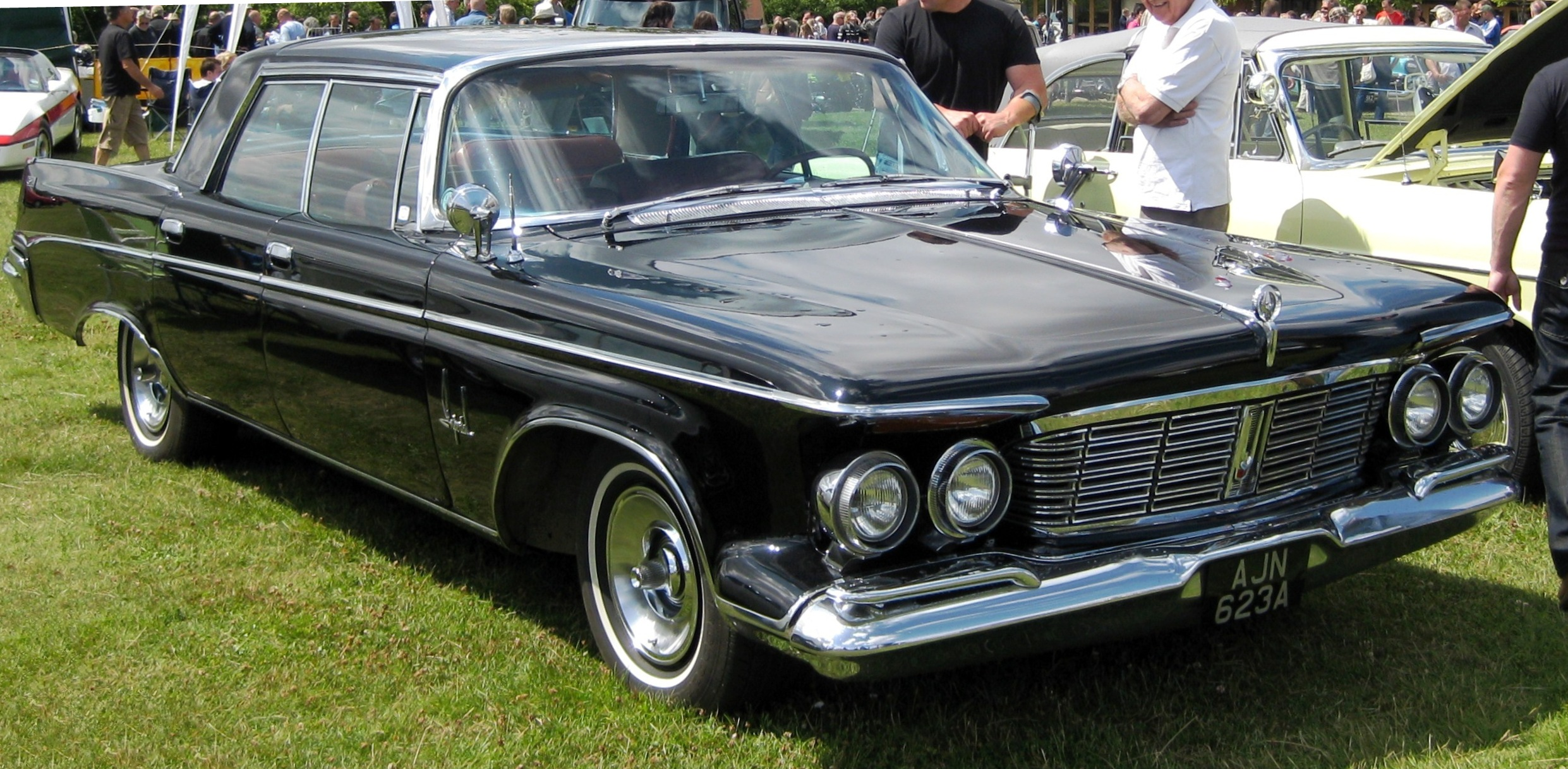
1963 Imperial Crown Southampton Four-Door hardtop

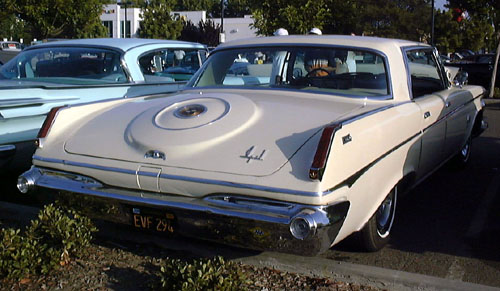
1963 Imperial Crown Southampton Four-Door hardtop

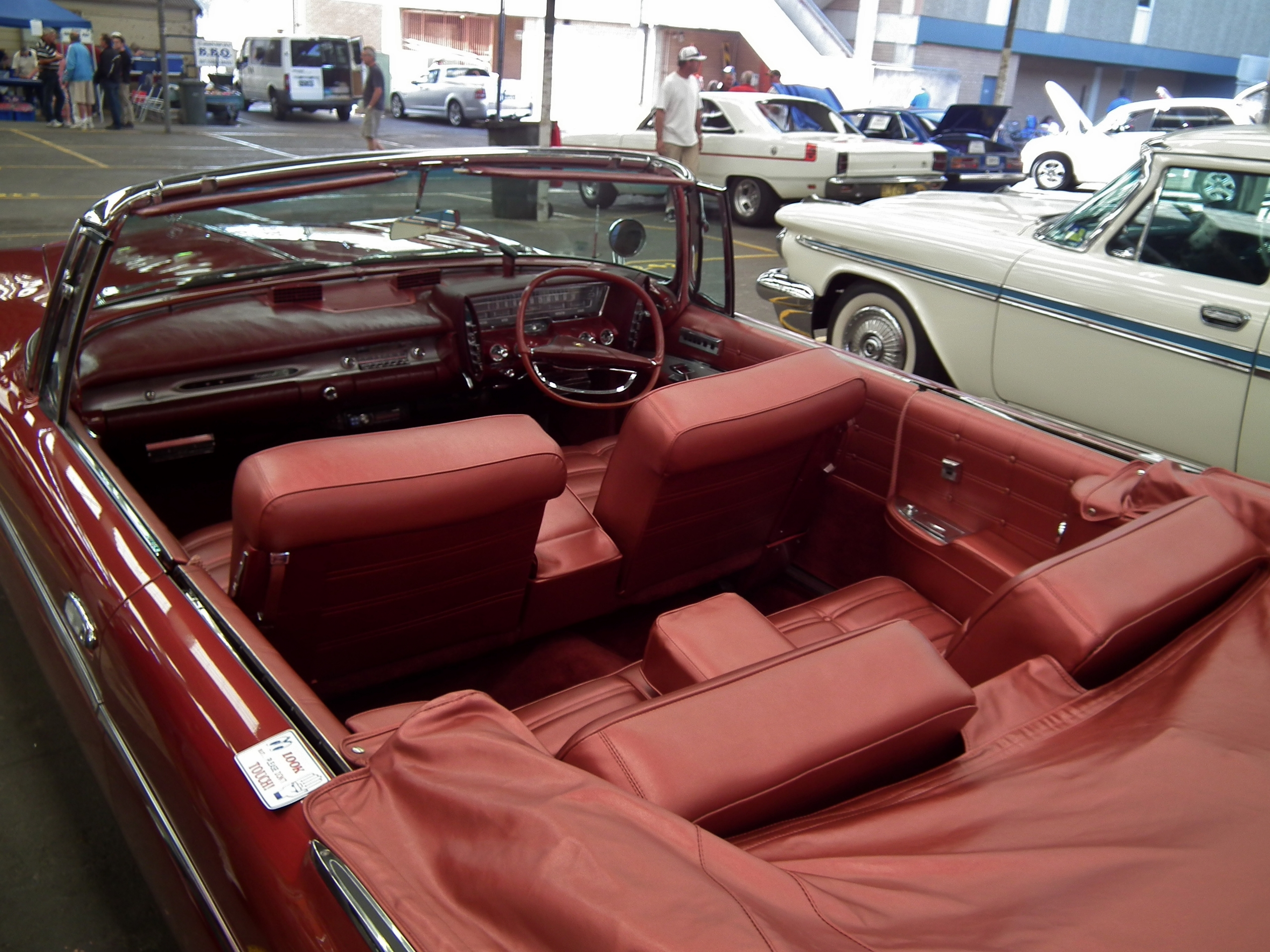
1963 Imperial Crown convertible Chrysler Australia built

The 1963 models saw the split grille replaced by a cluster of chromed rectangles, and the taillights were now inside the rear fenders, in ordinary fashion, for the first time. In addition, the designers redesigned the rooflines of Custom and Crown, two and four-door models to be more squared off with thicker c pillars. 1963 models were the last Virgil Exner–styled Imperials, however Elwood Engel began applying some of his own touches to them, especially in the form of the redesigned base and Crown roofs. The LeBaron roofs remained the same with formal styling and closed in the rear window. 14,121 cars were produced for 1963.

In 1961, Chrysler scored a coup by hiring Engel away from Ford, where he had designed the 1961 Lincoln Continental. Engel's design themes at Chrysler were a major departure from the fins of Virgil Exner, and instead featured a more familiar three-box design, but with more extreme rectilinear styling. And, at first glance, the total re-styling of the Imperial in 1964 was thought to strongly resemble Elwood Engel's previous efforts for the 1961 Lincoln Continental. Both cars shared clean, slab-sided body panels, thick C-pillars, and a chrome molding outlining the top of the fender line. However, Engel used subtle curves and parallelogram angles to give the Imperial a distinct and novel look.

=== 1964 (Series VY1-M, H) ===
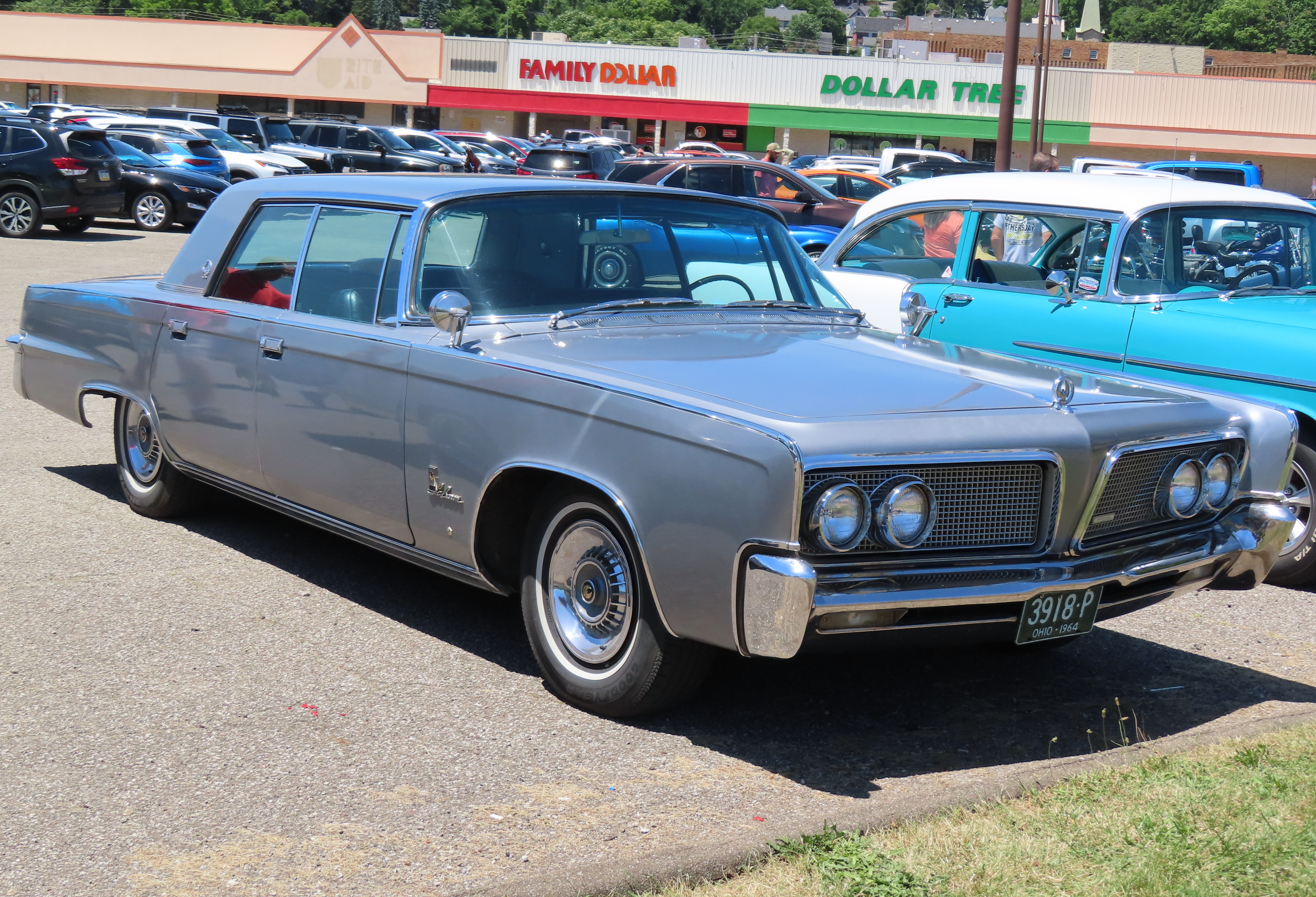
1964 Imperial LeBaron, front view

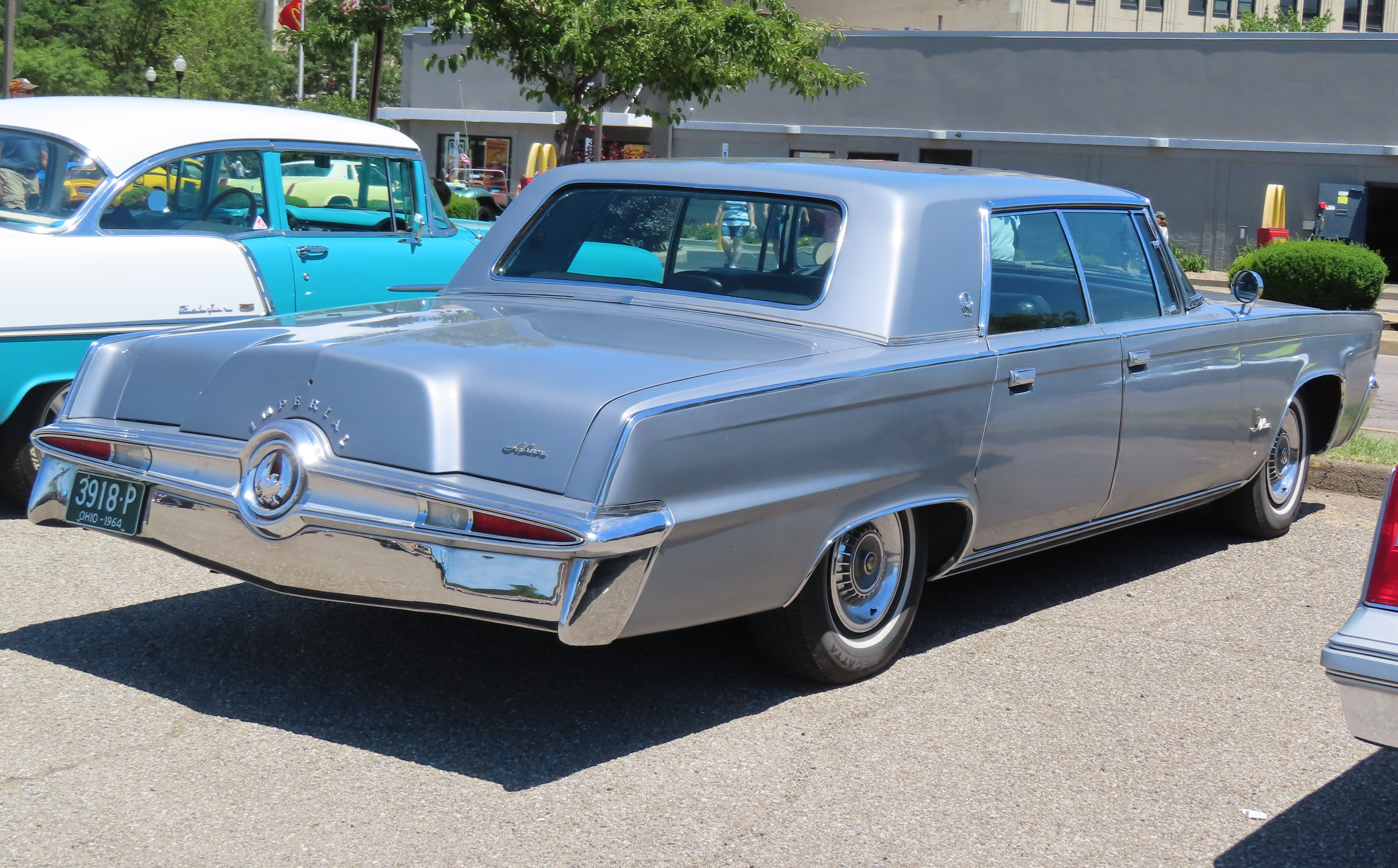
1964 Imperial LeBaron, rear view

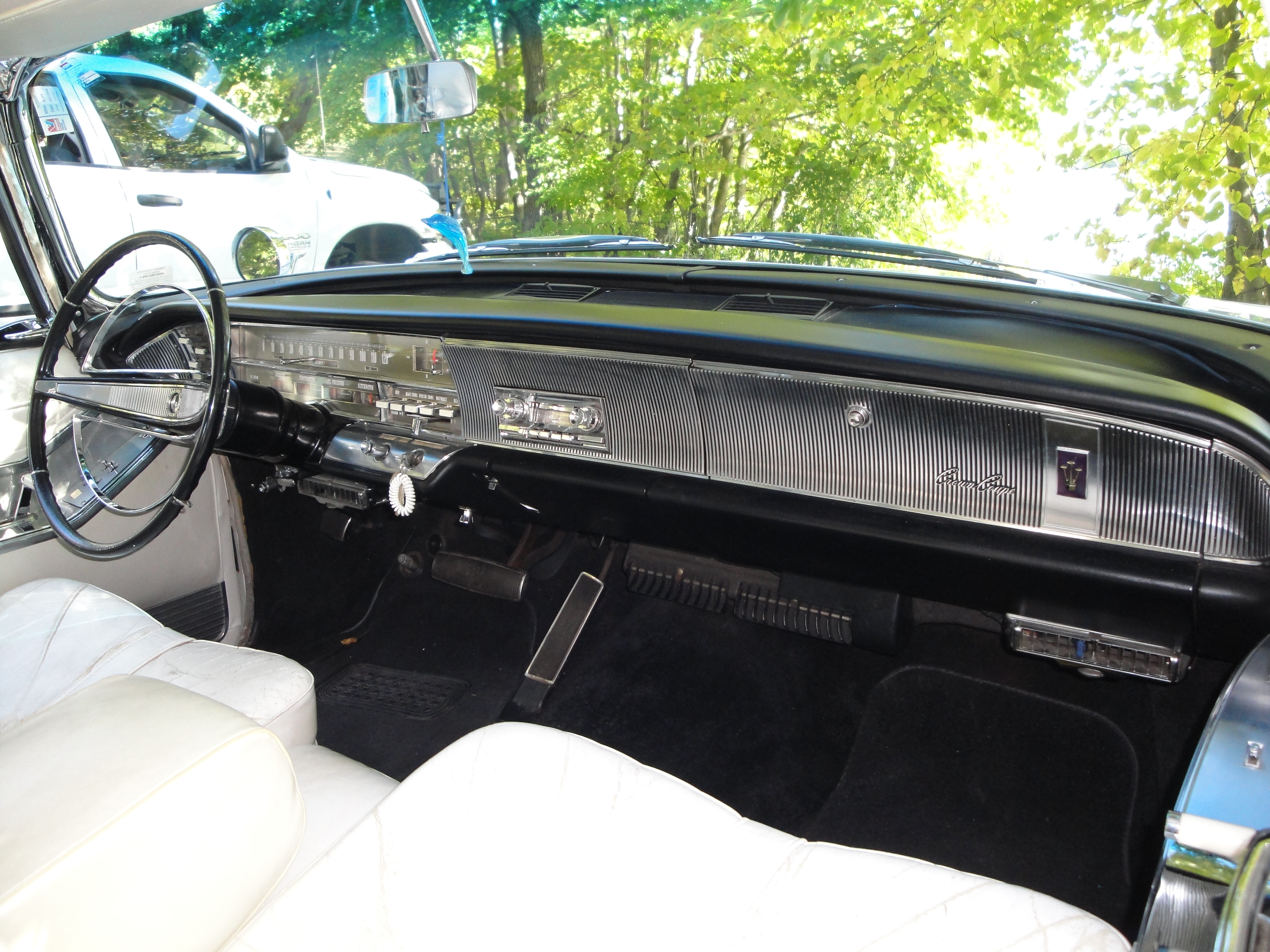
1964 Imperial Crown interior

The 1964 Imperials were the first designed entirely by Engel. Predictably, they bore a strong resemblance to the Lincoln Continental. The dashboards seemed more conventional because the squared-off steering wheel and electroluminescent dash lighting were gone, though the ribbon-style speedometer remained. A split grille returned after one year's absence, inspired by the 1955 model's appearance, and the faux spare tire bulge atop the trunk lid became squared-off and stylized. A central boss the fuel filler cap, covered with a large Imperial Eagle. Horizontal spear-shaped housings in the rear held a taillight and backup light. The defroster became standard for the windshield, optional was rear defroster.

The base Imperial Custom model was dropped, with available body styles including a four-door hardtop offered in the Crown and LeBaron levels of trim, and a two-door hardtop and convertible only in the Crown level of trim. As a result, power windows were now standard on all Imperials. Imperial Crown coupes adopted the smaller style LeBaron "formal rear window" that had been introduced in 1960, and both body styles could now be ordered with a vinyl roof. A total of 23,295 Imperials were sold, making 1964 its second-best sales year. A padded dash, power seats, power steering, power brakes, and headrests were standard on the convertible and Crown Coupe. A new option this year was an adjustable steering wheel.

Tom McCahill, an automobile critic with a reputation for colorful metaphors, quipped that Imperial "cornered at speed flatter than a tournament billiard table", unusual for a car of its prodigious weight and extreme dimensions. McCahill had already become a loyal customer, buying a new Imperial yearly through 1962. His visible and enthusiastic endorsement helped Imperial forge a reputation as the "driver's car" among the big three luxury makes. McCahill observed in 1964:

This is what I told them in California. When I hit the road with hundreds of pounds of baggage, typewriters and testing equipment, I'm not out there just to have fun. I want to get from here to there, which may be thousands of miles away, with as much comfort as possible. Besides, Boji [his dog] now demands comfort. So does my wife.

I've been on some pretty fancy trains, including private cars, and to this writing, I have never found anything quite as comfortable or more capable of getting me to my destination as the '64 Imperial LeBaron. It's a great automobile.

=== 1965 (Series AY1-M, H) ===
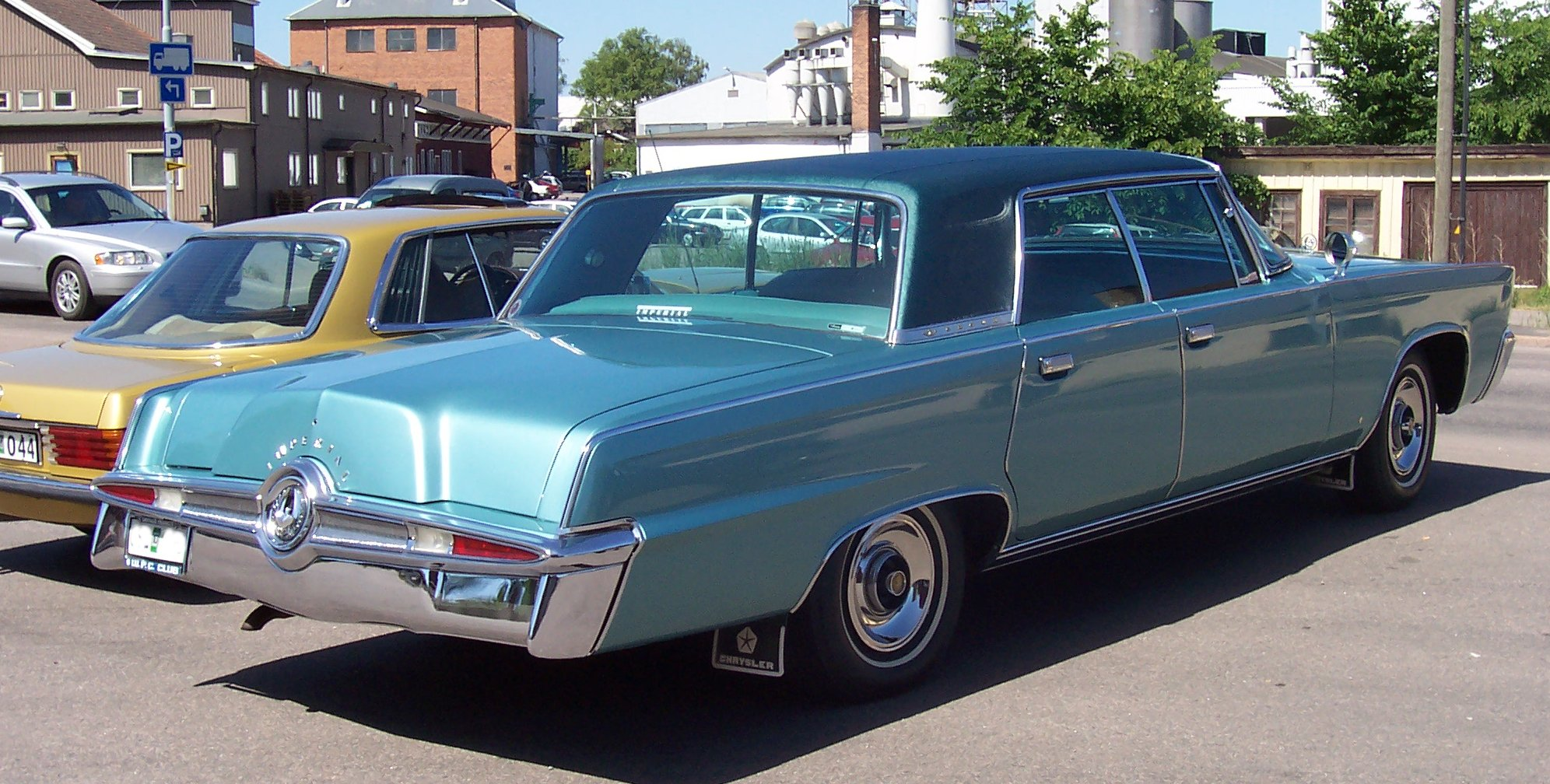
1965 Imperial Crown four-door

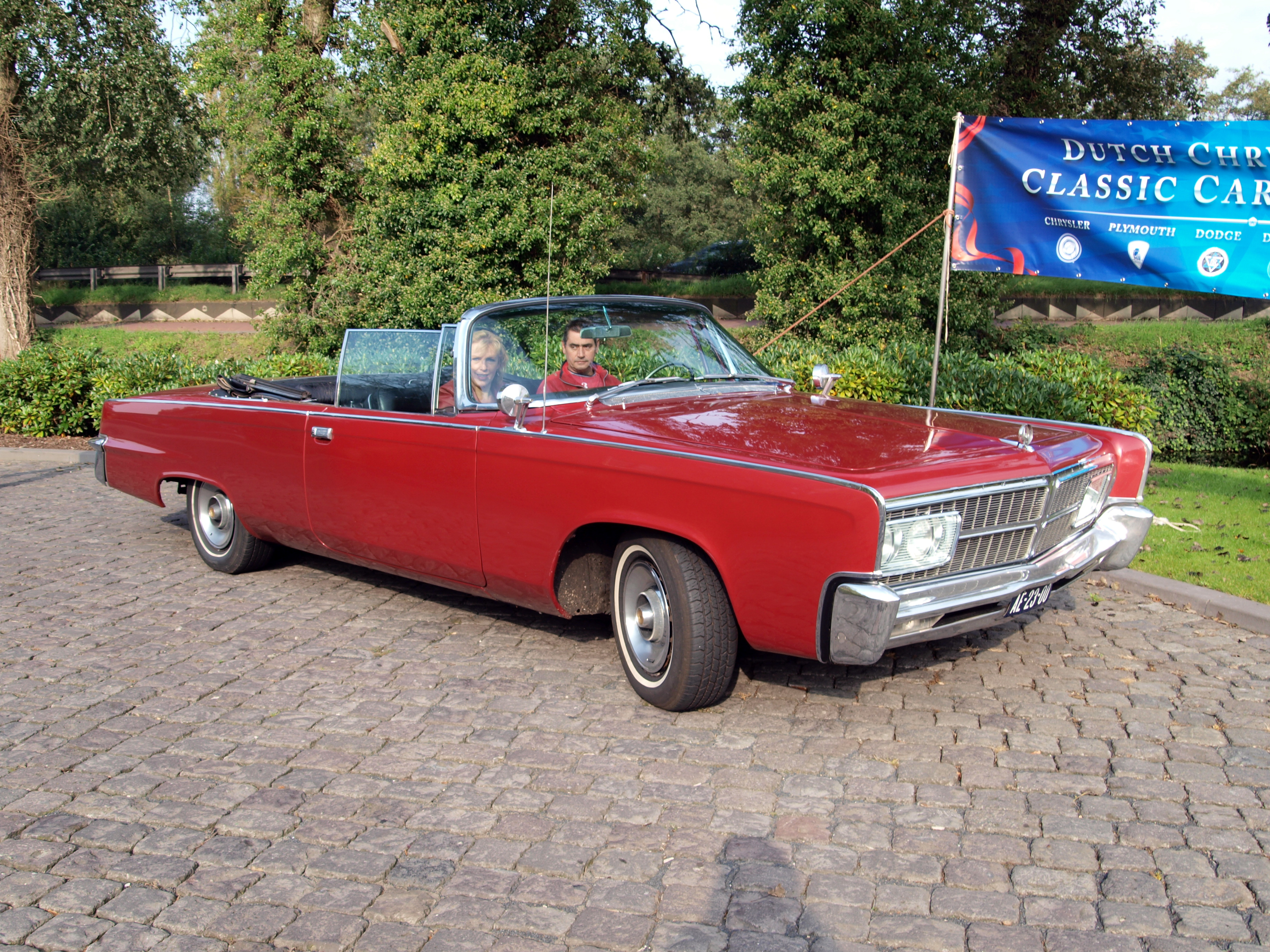
1965 Imperial Crown convertible

Changes for 1965 were largely confined to the front fascia and to trim, and replacement of the push-button automatic transmission gear selection system with a more conventional steering column-mounted shift lever. The split grille was gone, replaced by a large chromed crossbar and surround, and the headlights were inset into the grille behind glass covers (similar to that year's Chrysler 300 and New Yorker models) with etched horizontal lines imitating the grille. As pointed out by the sales literature, 100-year-old Claro Walnut trim was added to the interior. Production totaled 18,409.

=== 1966 (Series BY1-M, H) ===
This was the final year for the Imperial platform first introduced in 1956 for the 1957 model year. All subsequent years through 1966 used this same basic platform with annual changes to the body sheetmetal. However, the Imperial still used the wrap-around windshield that had been dropped by most other makes to facilitate egress when they almost all simultaneously downsized for 1961.

The 1966 model year saw a change to an egg-crate grille. The glass headlight covers lost the etched lines but gained twin 24k gold bands around the perimeter. The trunk lid bulge became more squared off with a smaller Imperial script off to the side. The backup lights were moved to the lower bumper, nearly doubling taillight size. The Claro Walnut trim that had been introduced the previous year was used more extensively and would be replaced the following year. The 413 cu in (6.8 L) engine that had been standard since 1959 was replaced with a 350 hp (261 kW; 355 PS) 440 cu in (7.2 L) engine.

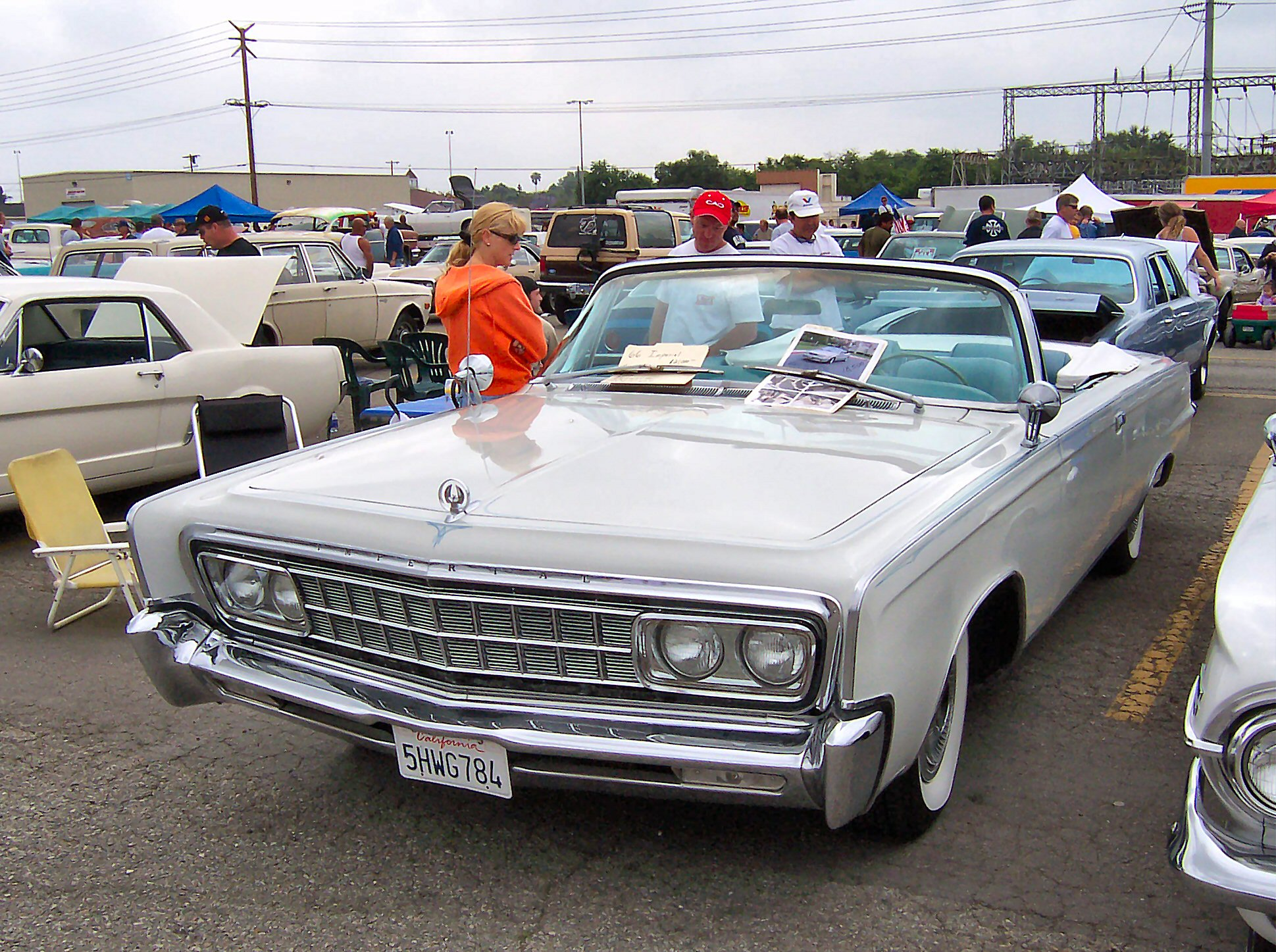
1966 Imperial Crown convertible

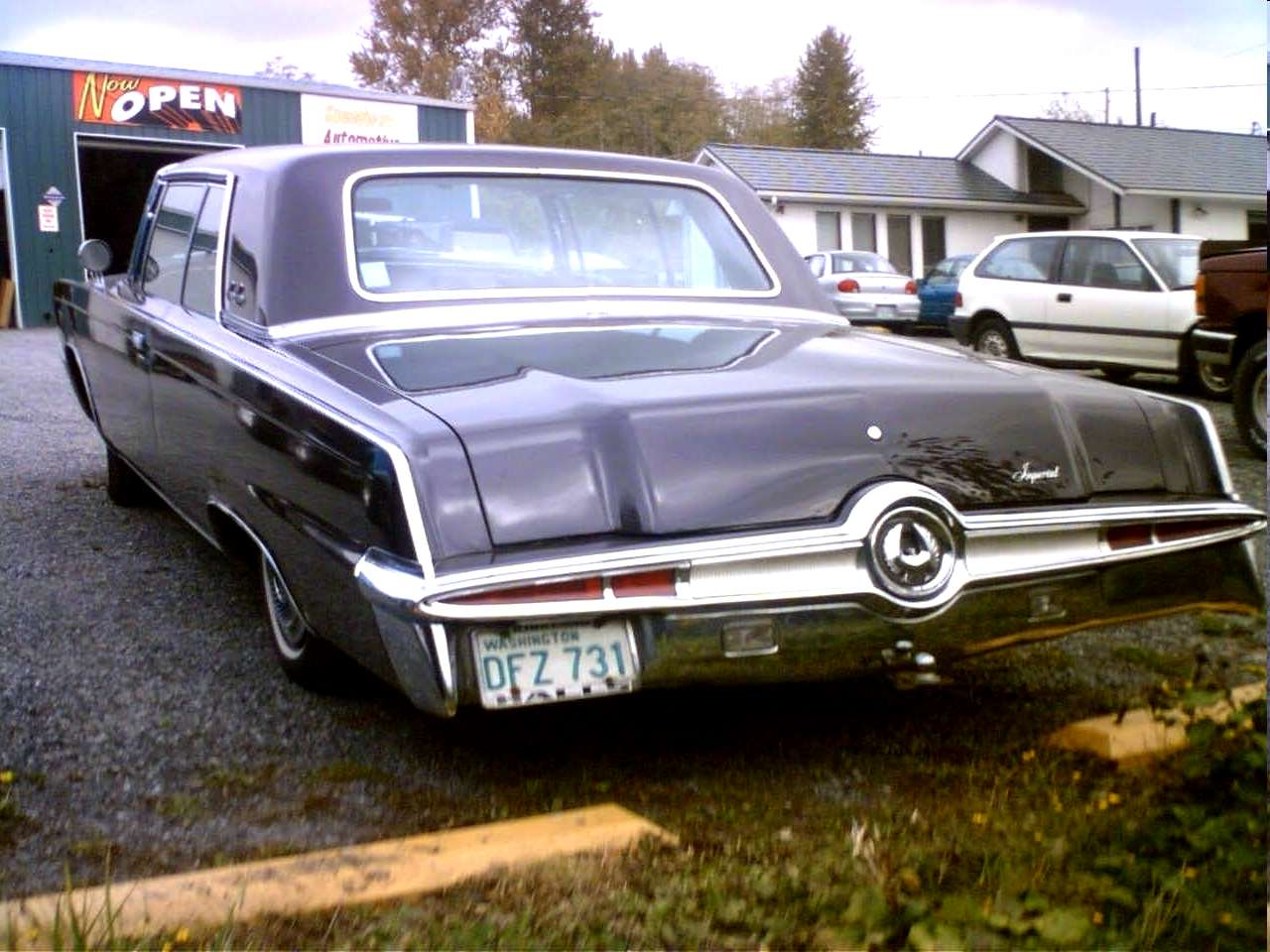
1966 Imperial Crown coupe

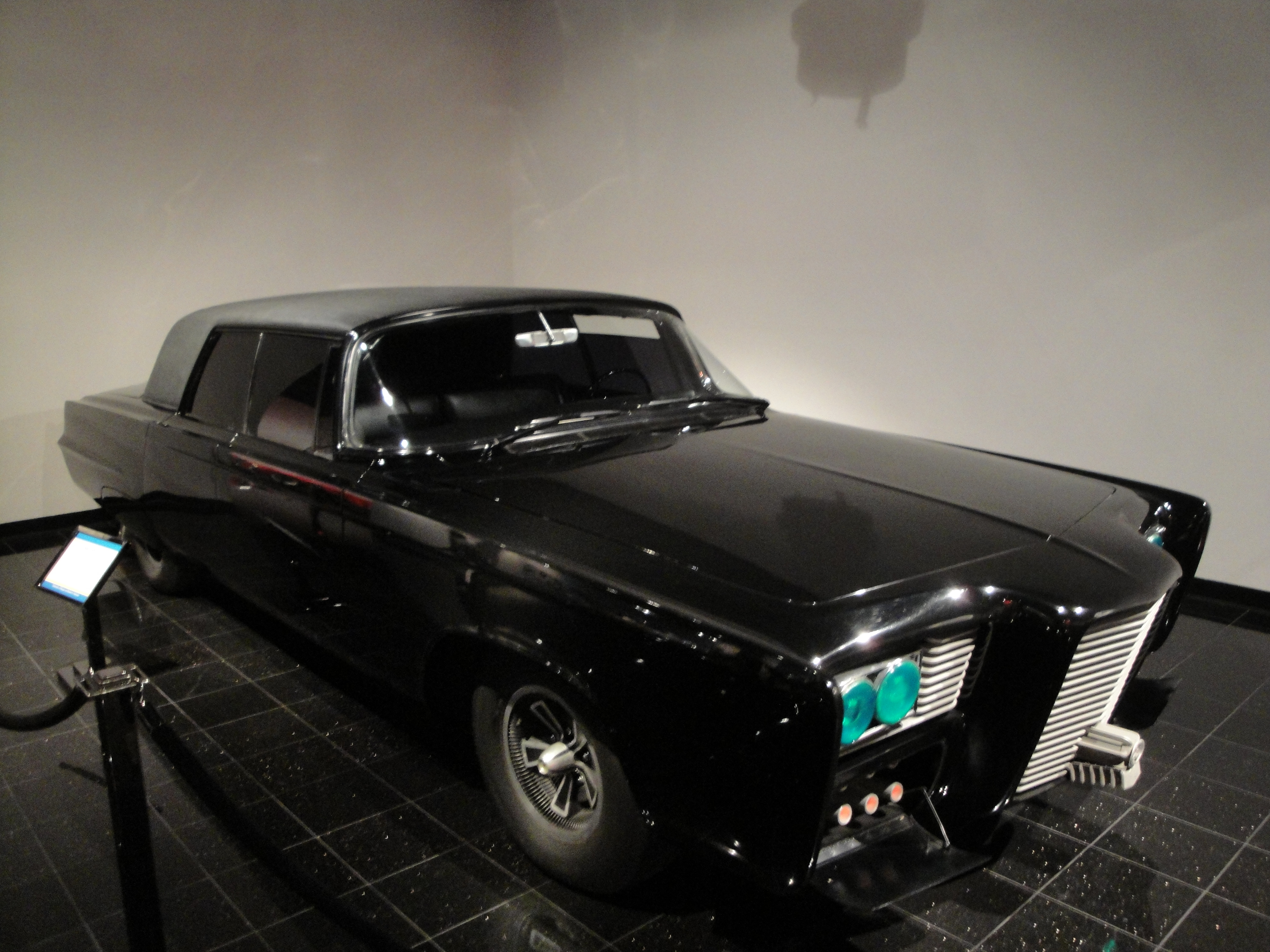
Green Hornet Black Beauty (1966 TV Series)

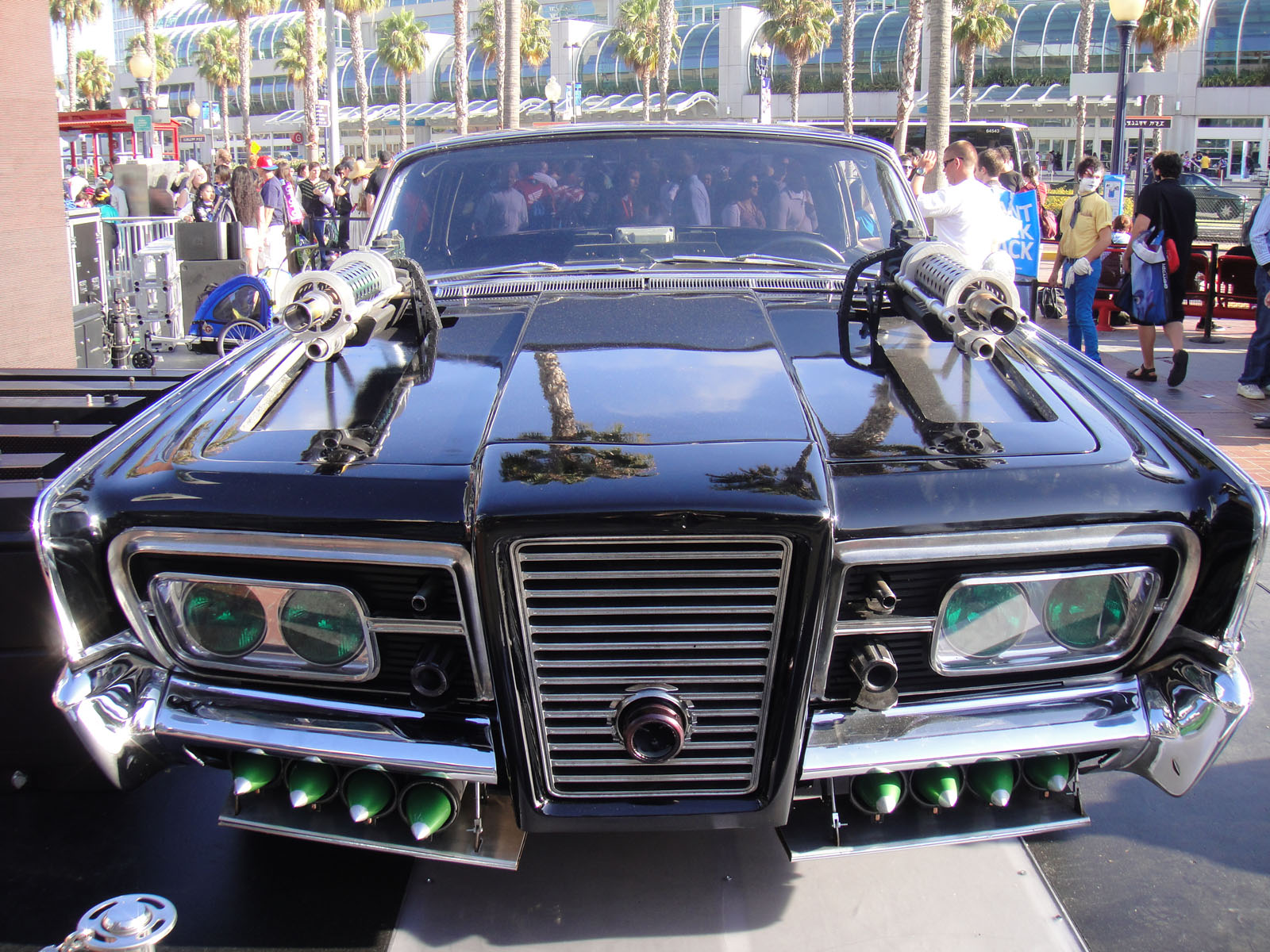
Green Hornet Black Beauty (2011 Film)

Production totaled 13,752. There was a 1966 LeBaron that was presented to Pope Paul VI at the UN in New York for his use. Also this year, Imperial was the basis for "The Black Beauty," a rolling arsenal on the ABC-TV series The Green Hornet, starring Van Williams and Bruce Lee. A black Imperial of this year would also be restored as a wedding anniversary gift for Richard "The Old Man" Harrison who used to be on the History Channel show, Pawn Stars.

== Third generation (1967–1968) ==
Third generation
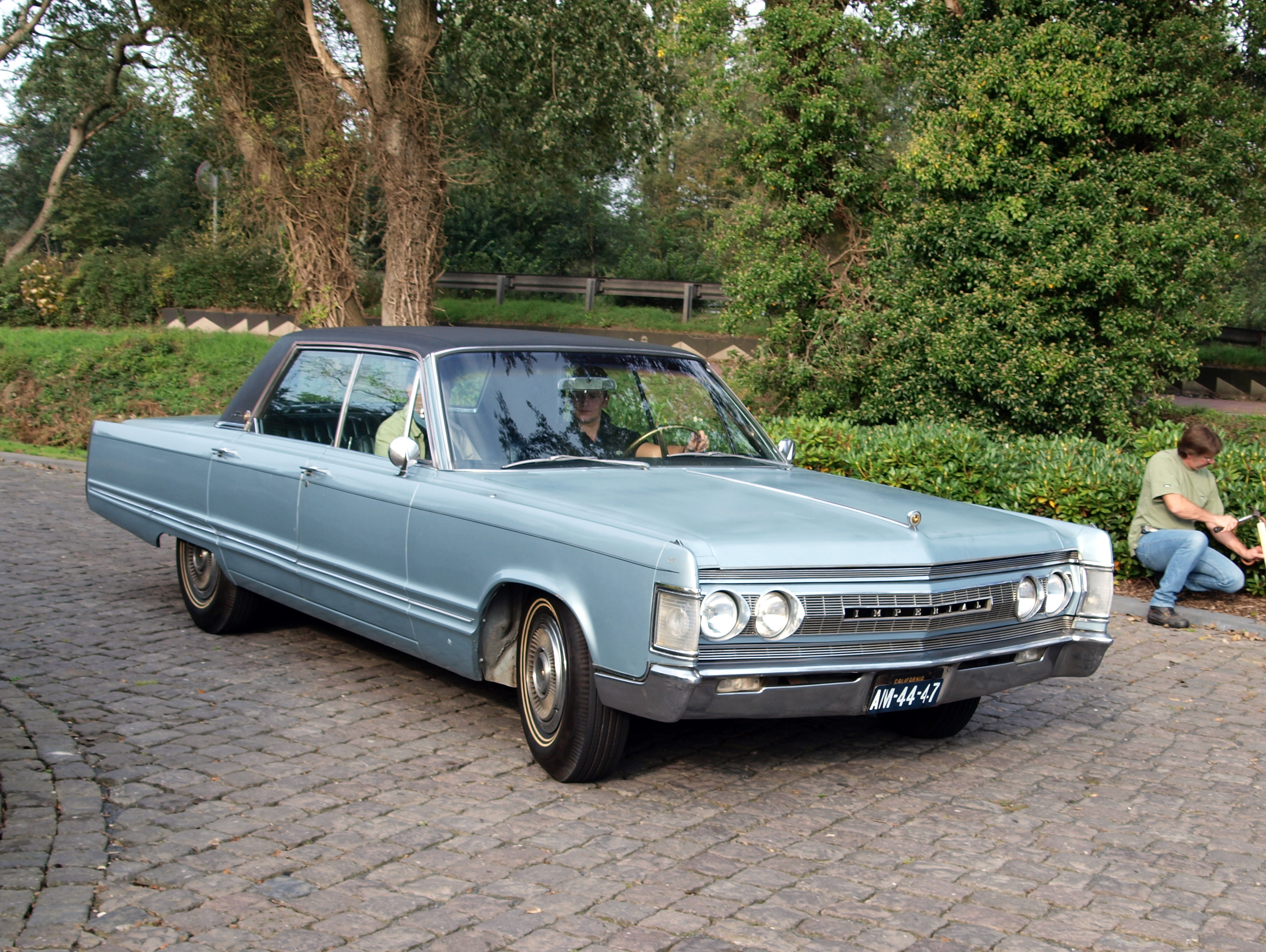
- 1967 Imperial LeBaron

Overview
- Production: 1966–1968
- Model years: 1967–1968
- Assembly: United States: Detroit, Michigan (Jefferson Avenue Assembly); United States: Belvidere, Illinois (Belvidere Assembly Plant)
- Designer: Elwood Engel

Body and chassis
- Body style: 2-door hardtop 2-door convertible 4-door sedan 4-door hardtop
- Platform: C-body
- Related: Chrysler 300; Chrysler New Yorker; Chrysler Newport; Chrysler Town & Country

Powertrain
- Engine: 440 cu in (7.2 L) Wedge V8
- Transmission: 3-speed TorqueFlite A727 automatic

Dimensions
- Wheelbase: 127 in (3,226 mm)
- Length: 1967: 224.7 in (5,707 mm); 1968: 224.5 in (5,702 mm)
- Width: 79.6 in (2,022 mm)
- Height: 1967: 56.7 in (1,440 mm); 1968: 57.0 in (1,448 mm)
- Curb weight: 4,900–5,200 lb (2,200–2,400 kg)

Imperial styling was completely new for the 1967 and 1968 models. Using a two-inch shorter wheelbase, Imperial switched from the body-on-frame platform (D-body) to a unibody platform (C-body platform used in other full-size Mopars.) While Imperial's front K member was 3.0 inches (76 mm) longer than a Chrysler's, dimensions behind the front fenders were similar. One reason for the change was that Chrysler had gained experience with unibody construction and was ready to apply it to the company's flagship line.

The economic component was that the switch to the C-body was less expensive than maintaining a separate platform for Imperial, which was increasingly difficult to justify given Imperial's relatively low sales volume. The new platform resulted in a significant reduction in weight as well as in exterior and interior dimensions. With the partnership gone between Ghia and Chrysler, limousines based on the Imperial were produced by Armbruster-Stageway of Fort Smith Arkansas. The limousines were lengthened 36 in (91 cm), most of it between the front and back doors with a few inches added between the rear door and the rear wheel, allowing room for two rear-facing seats with a small console/bar in between. The limousine conversions were longer than the earlier Ghia cars, and longer than the Cadillac Series 75 limousines.

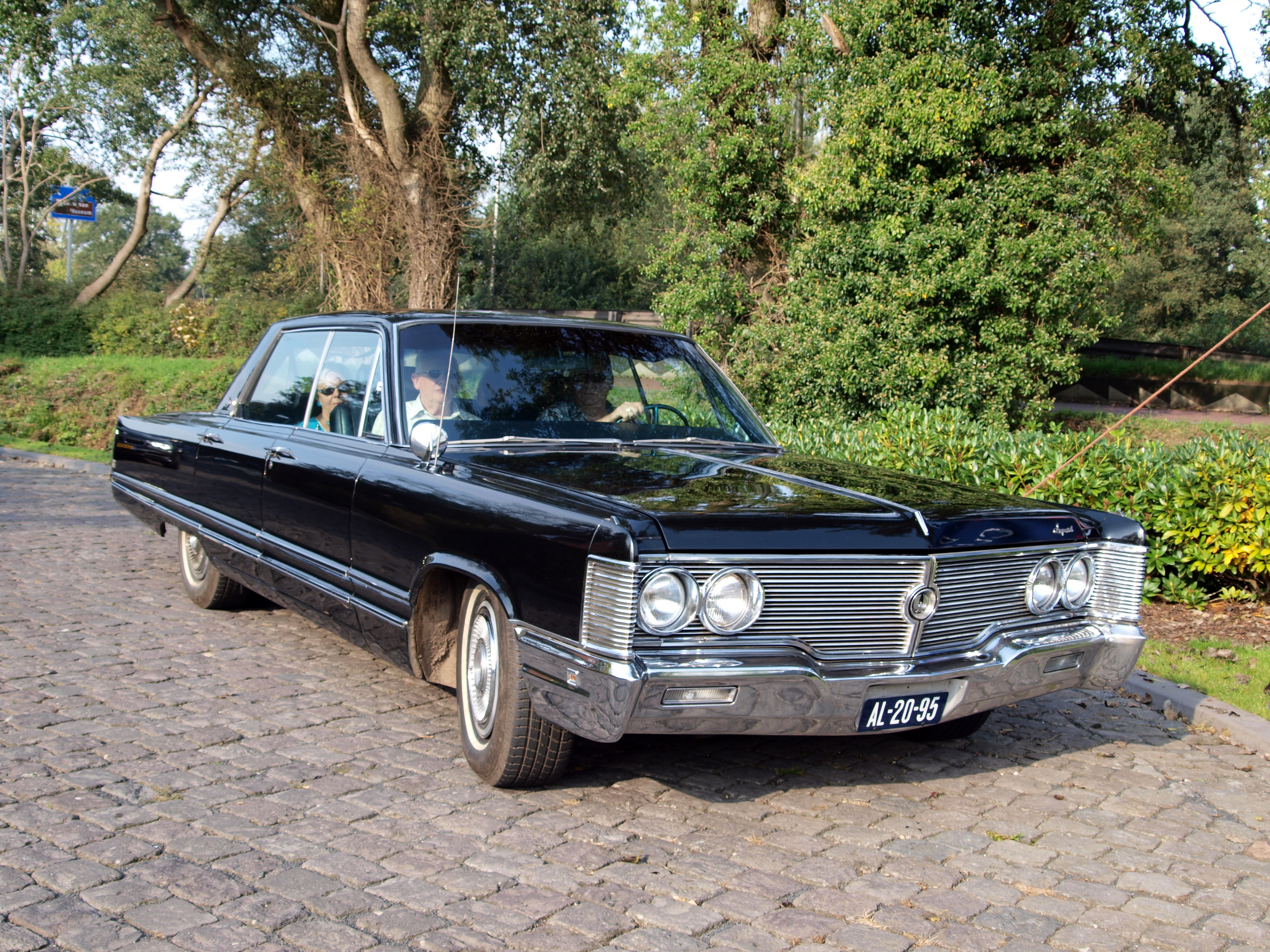
1968 Imperial LeBaron

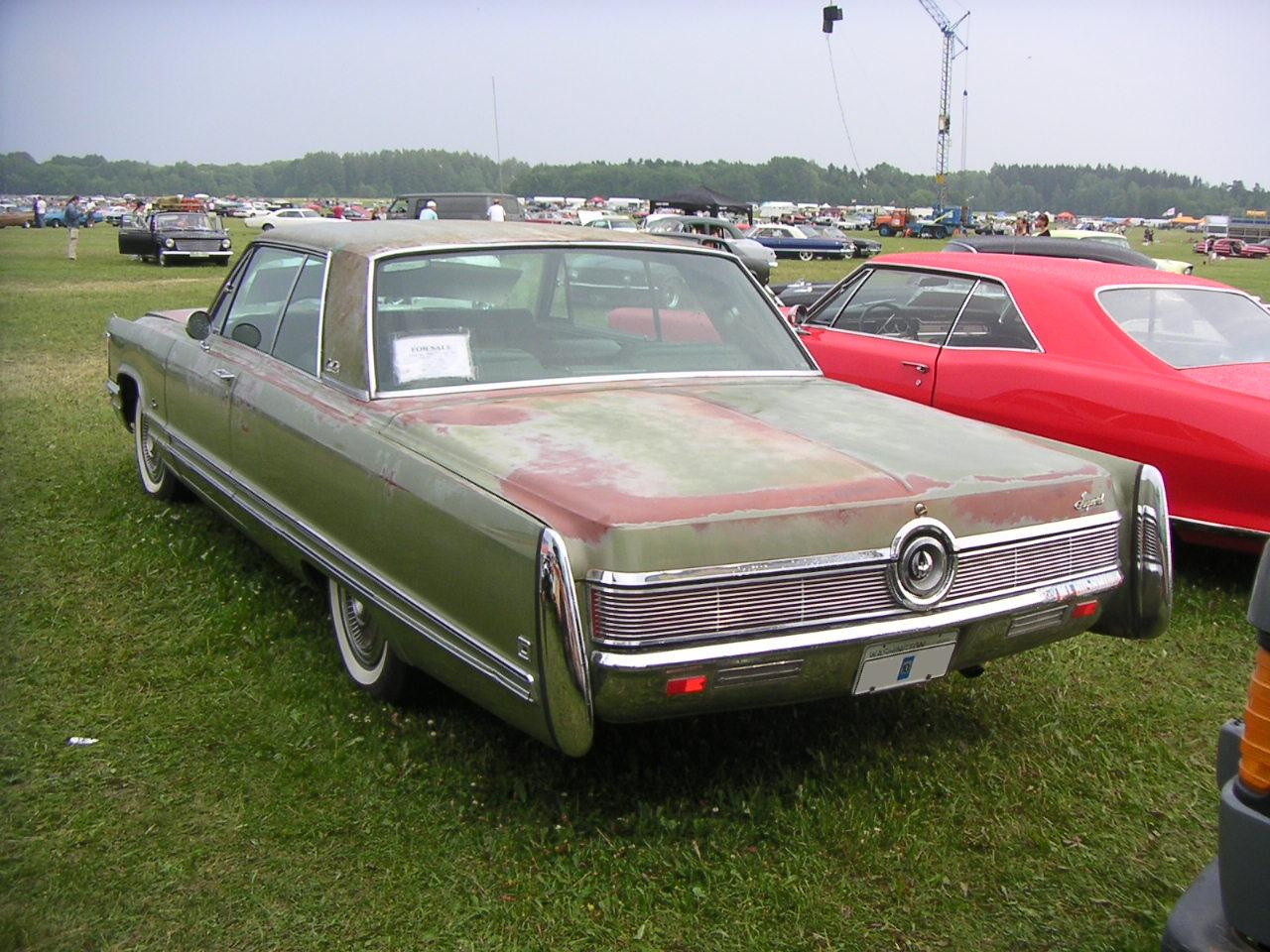
1968 Imperial Crown Coupe rear

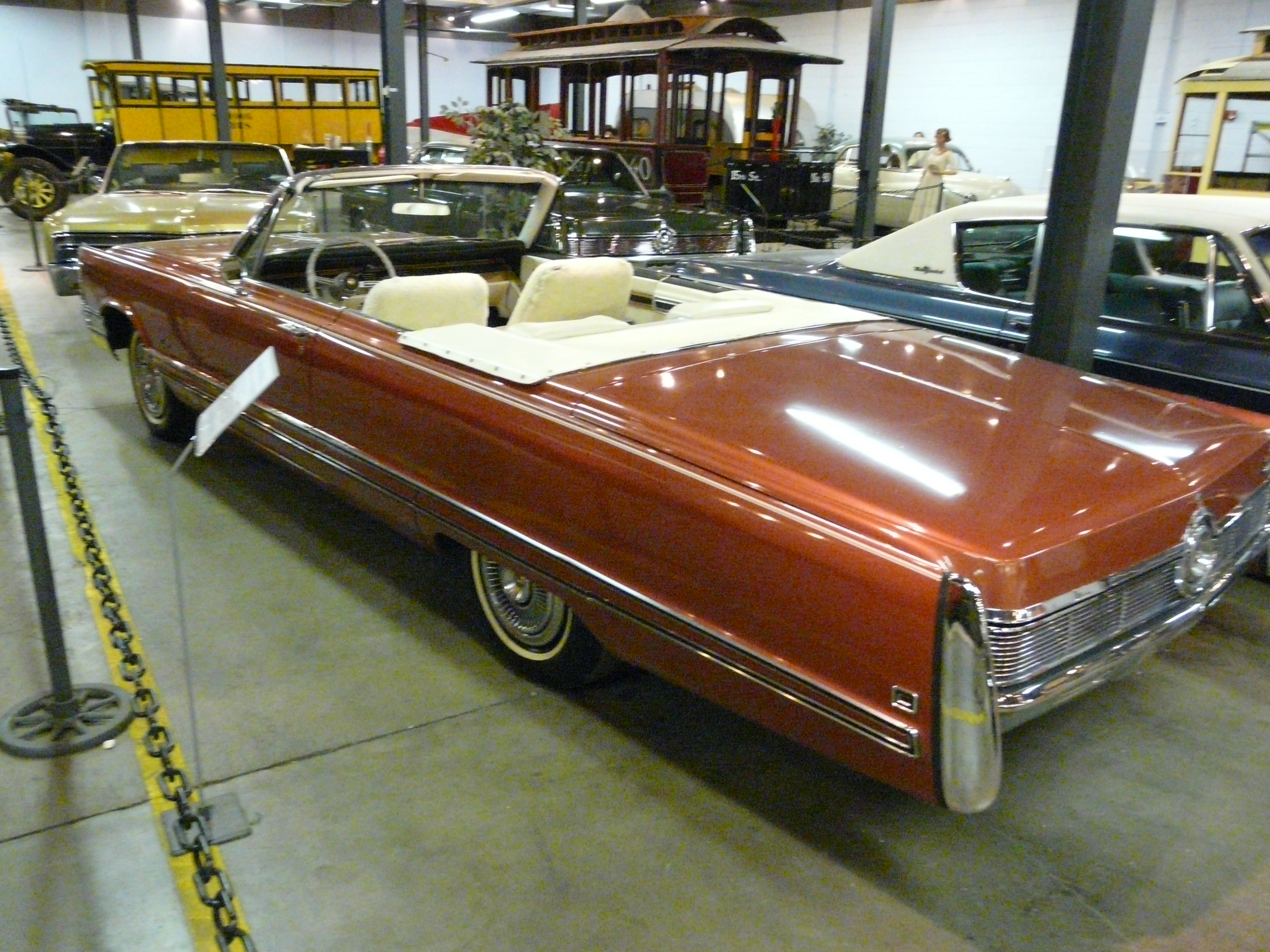
1968 Imperial Crown Coupe convertible rear

=== 1967 (Series CY1-M, H) ===
Imperial shared the unibody platform with other full-sized Chrysler Corporation cars, but retained a unique bodyshell. The styling kept the overall straight-line, sharp-edged Engel theme, but there were a number of detail changes intended to make Imperial look less like Lincoln and more into its own territory. The spare tire bulge was completely gone from the rear, although the boss remained. The practically full-width taillights spread out from it, straight, but ended before chrome-tipped rear wings. A base Imperial model, simply called Imperial, returned for the first time since 1963, complementing the Crown and LeBaron levels of trim. It was the first four-door pillared Imperial sedan since 1960. New standard features included dual brakes with upfront discs and lane-change blinkers. Dual exhaust was no longer standard on the convertible. The only way to get it was to order the "TNT" version of the 440 engine, an option that promised more power.

An option on Crown coupes was the Mobile Director. Essentially the front passenger seat turned to face rearward and a small table and high-intensity light folded out over the back seat. The idea was that an executive could turn around and do work while being driven to the office, or he could sit behind the driver and a secretary could take dictation in the rear-facing front seat. The concept originated with the 1966 Mobile Executive Show Car that was an Imperial Coupe fitted with a telephone, Dictaphone, writing table, typewriter, television, reading lamp, and stereo. Chrysler also used the reversed front seat idea in the 300X show car. Costing $597.40 ($317.60 in 1968), at a time when a Crown coupe started at US$6,011, it was a very expensive option. Only 81 Crown coupes were ordered this way, and only a handful so equipped are known to survive. The option was canceled at the end of the 1968 model year. Sales increased to 17,614.

=== 1968 (Series DY1-M, H) ===
The 1968 Imperial was little changed from the previous year. The grille changed to a brightly chromed one with thin horizontal bars, split in the middle by vertical chrome and a round Imperial Eagle badge. This badge replaced the stand-up hood ornament used on the 1967s. The cornering lamp lenses were now covered by matching grilles. At the rear, the horizontal bars over the taillights remained, but the gas filler door pull was changed to a cast metal eagle instead of a round knob containing a plastic emblem. 1968 cars also gained rear reflectors. All 1968s came with a Federally mandated energy-absorbing steering column. The base-level model was canceled after only one year and the four-door sedan became part of the Crown level of trim. At US$7,599, the Imperial LeBaron was one of the most expensive American cars available at the time. This was also the last year for the Imperial convertible. A total of 15,367 Imperials were sold in 1968.

== Fourth generation (1969–1973) ==
Fourth generation
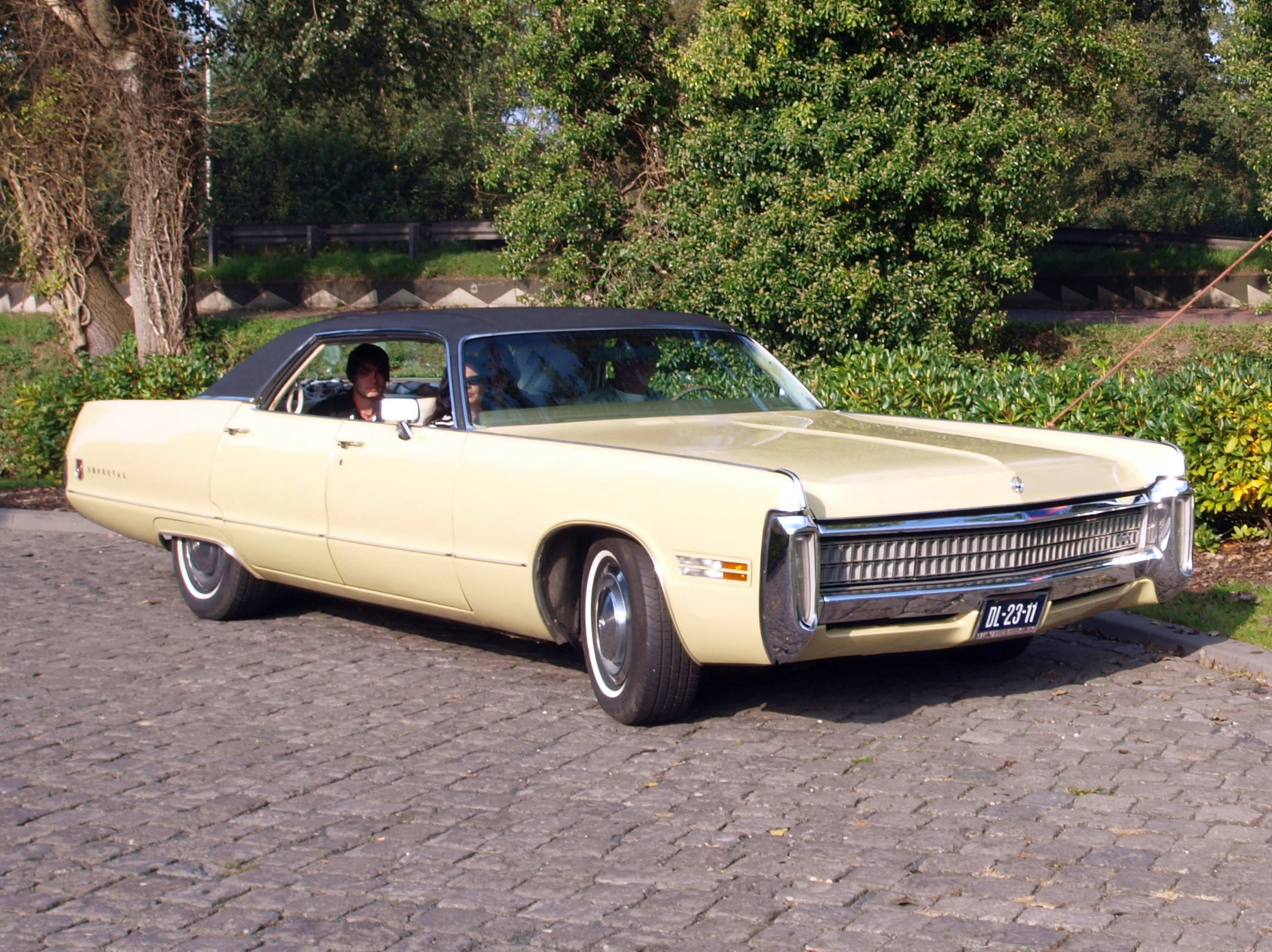
- 1972 Imperial Le Baron 4-door hardtop

Overview
- Production: 1968–1973
- Model years: 1969–1973
- Assembly: United States: Detroit, Michigan (Jefferson Avenue Assembly)
- Designer: Elwood Engel

Body and chassis
- Body style: 2/4-door hardtop 4-door sedan
- Platform: C-body
- Related: Chrysler 300; Chrysler New Yorker; Chrysler Newport; Chrysler Town & Country

Powertrain
- Engine: 440 cu in (7.2 L) Wedge V8
- Transmission: 3-speed TorqueFlite A727 automatic

Dimensions
- Wheelbase: 127.0 in (3,226 mm)
- Length: 1969–71: 229.7 in (5,834 mm); 1972: 229.5 in (5,829 mm); 1973: 235.3 in (5,977 mm)
- Width: 1969–71: 79.1 in (2,009 mm); 1972–73: 79.6 in (2,022 mm)
- Height: 1969–70: 55.7 in (1,415 mm); 1971: 56.1 in (1,425 mm); 1972: 56.0 in (1,422 mm); 1973: 56.2 in (1,427 mm)
- Curb weight: 4,900–5,200 lb (2,200–2,400 kg)

The "Fuselage Look" was how Chrysler described its new styling for 1969. Instead of the square lines of the 1964 through 1968 models, the new Imperials featured tumblehome sides, bulging at the beltline like an airliner's fuselage and tucking in down to the rocker panels. The new styling made the cars look longer and wider, and strongly curved side glass increased shoulder room without expanding overall body width compared to the previous C-body. Front and rear shoulder room increased from 59.4 to 62.7 in (1,509 to 1,593 mm) on four-door hardtops.

To reduce development and tooling costs, and bring overall expenditures more in line with actual sales, Imperial began to share some of its bodyshell with the Chrysler New Yorker for the first time since 1956. Consequently, glass and roofs were common with the entry-level Chrysler Newport. In other respects, however, little had changed; construction was still unibody, the wheelbase was still stretched 3.0 in (76 mm) longer than a Chrysler's in front of the passenger section, the engine and transmission were the same, and the torsion bar front suspension was still used.

=== 1969 (Series EY-L, M) ===
In keeping with the times, the look was sleeker, with a reduced, more subtle level of trim. For the first time, the lights were hidden behind doors, giving a fashionable at the time full-width grille look using "loop" bumpers. Only this year the Imperial featured sequential turn signals. The 1969 model year was the last for pillared sedans, and it was also the first year for the Imperial LeBaron coupe. At 229.7 in (5,834 mm), the Imperial once again became the longest non-limousine car made in America, and would remain so through 1973 when it would set the post-WW II record for non-limousine car length. A total of 22,083 were produced, making it Imperial's third-best ever year. Ambruster-Stageway of Fort Smith Arkansas continued with limousine conversions using the 1969 through 1971 design. Twelve conversions were delivered over the three years, including one for then New York governor Nelson Rockefeller.

=== 1970 (Series FY-L, M) ===
The 1970 models differed only in minor ways. The grille pattern changed to a larger egg-crate design; the front cornering lamps were rectangular instead of the "shark gill" pattern of 1969 models. A wide chrome strip was added at the rocker panels, vinyl side trim was made optional, and (for this year only) the fender skirts were gone. It was the final year for the Crown series and this was the first year the LeBaron out sold the Crown. Imperial had only two models and styles of Imperial for 1970. A LeBaron hardtop sedan and coupe and the Crown hardtop coupe and sedan. Production totaled 11,816 for the 1970 Imperial models.

=== 1971 (Series GY-M) ===
For 1971, the Imperial Eagle at the front of the hood was gone, replaced by the word IMPERIAL; the decklid badge said, for the first time, "IMPERIAL by Chrysler" and the only model offered was the LeBaron. The 1971 Imperial is notable for being the first production car in America with a 4-wheel Anti-lock braking system (ABS) from Bendix, a rarely selected option at that time. A total of 11,569 1971 Imperials were produced with a retail price of US$6,276 for the sedan.

Although the vinyl top was standard, for a short time a unique paisley-patterned vinyl top in a burgundy color was available as an option on burgundy-painted cars. It has been rumored that this top had actually been overprinted on waste "Mod Top" patterned vinyl, which had been available on some 1969 and 1970 model year Dodge and Plymouth cars, but according to Jeffrey Godshall, a Chrysler designer and frequent contributor to the magazine Collectible Automobile, this was not the case. With exposure to the elements, the burgundy overprint faded, and the pattern began to show through in a purple "paisley" pattern. Chrysler replaced affected tops with either white or black standard vinyl, but some survive.

=== 1972 (Series HY-M) ===
Evolutionary styling was the basis for completely new sheetmetal for the 1972 model year, giving the cars a bigger and heavier all-around appearance. A somewhat more rounded side profile without a character line down the side and chrome trim on the top seams of the fenders from the rear windows forward appeared. The front fascia was all new and imposing-looking, and the rear featured vertical teardrop taillights for the first time, with side marker lights in the form of shields with eagles on them. Sales increased to 15,796. Two all-black LeBaron sedans were delivered to the US Secret Service, which then turned them over to Hess and Eisenhardt, which converted them into limos for Presidential use. Both cars were used as late as 1981, and carried Ronald Reagan and his staff to Capitol Hill for his presidential swearing-in ceremony in January 1981.

=== 1973 (Series 3Y-M) ===
The 1973 model year saw new federal bumper standards to prevent damage. This meant the Imperials gained large rubber over-riders front and rear, adding 5.8 inches (147 mm) to the car's length, making it the longest production car in North America for that year and the longest postwar (non-limousine) production car at 235.3 inches (5,977 mm). The front bumper ends revived a Woodlite headlamp appearance which was a popular, extra cost item during the 1930s. As 1973 was in general a good year for the auto industry, 16,729 of the 1973 Imperials were built and sold.

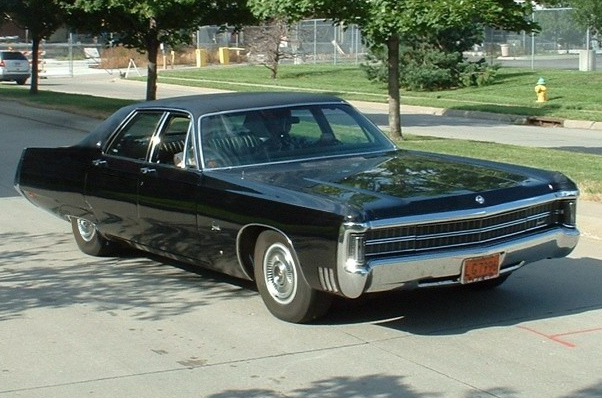
1969 Imperial Crown Four-Door Sedan

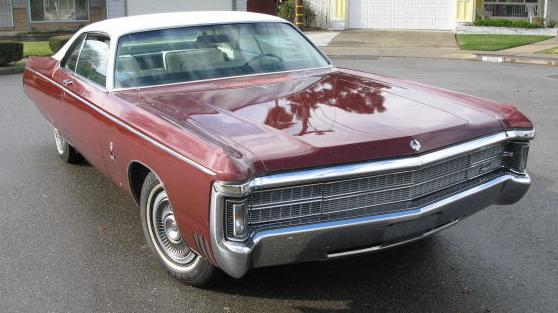
1969 Imperial LeBaron Two-Door Hardtop

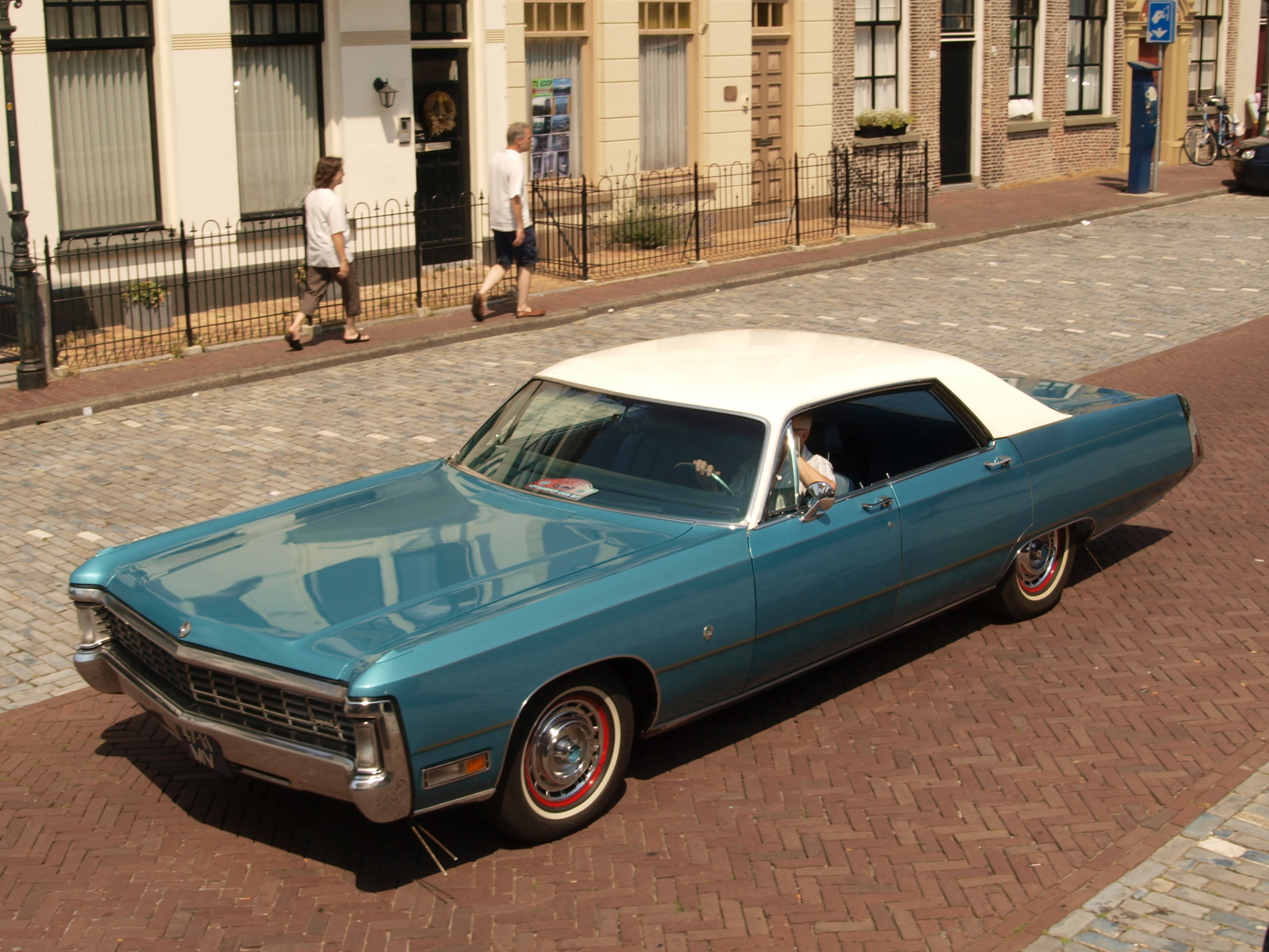
1970 Imperial Crown

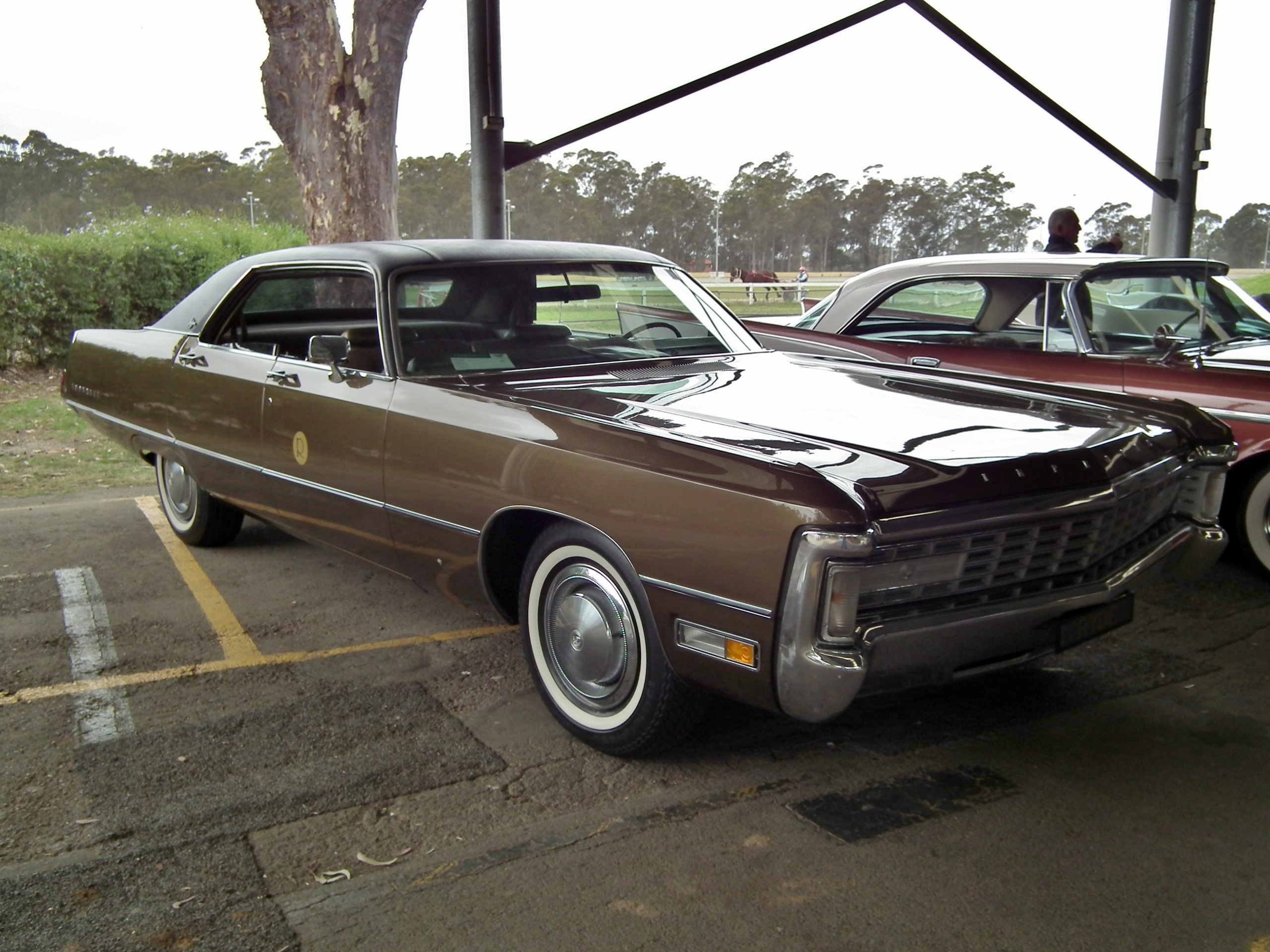
1971 Imperial LeBaron 4-door hardtop

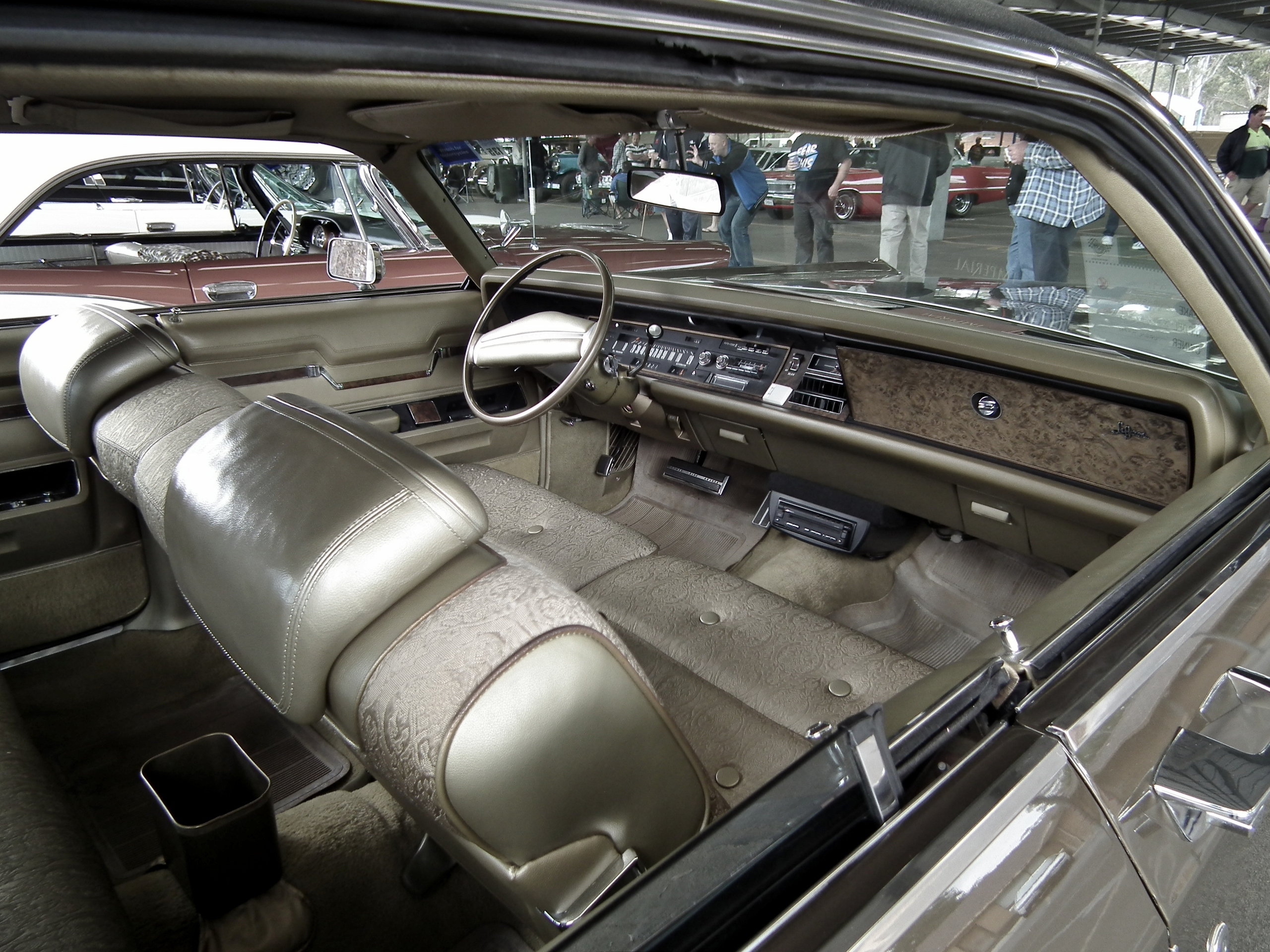
1971 Imperial LeBaron 4-door hardtop interior

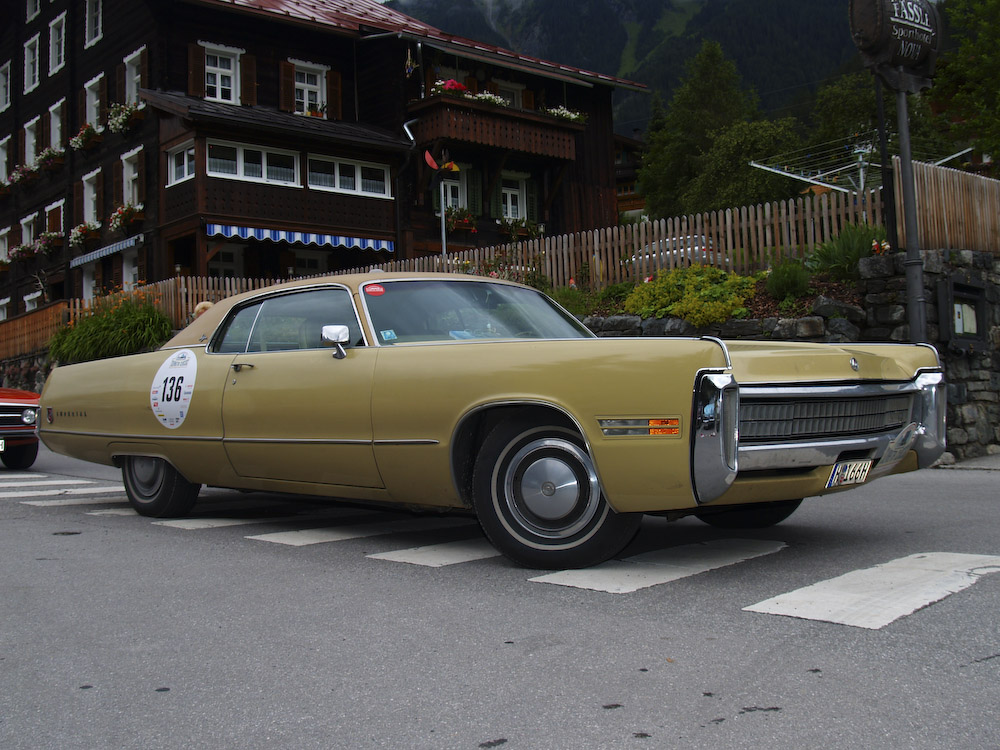
1972 Imperial LeBaron 2-door hardtop

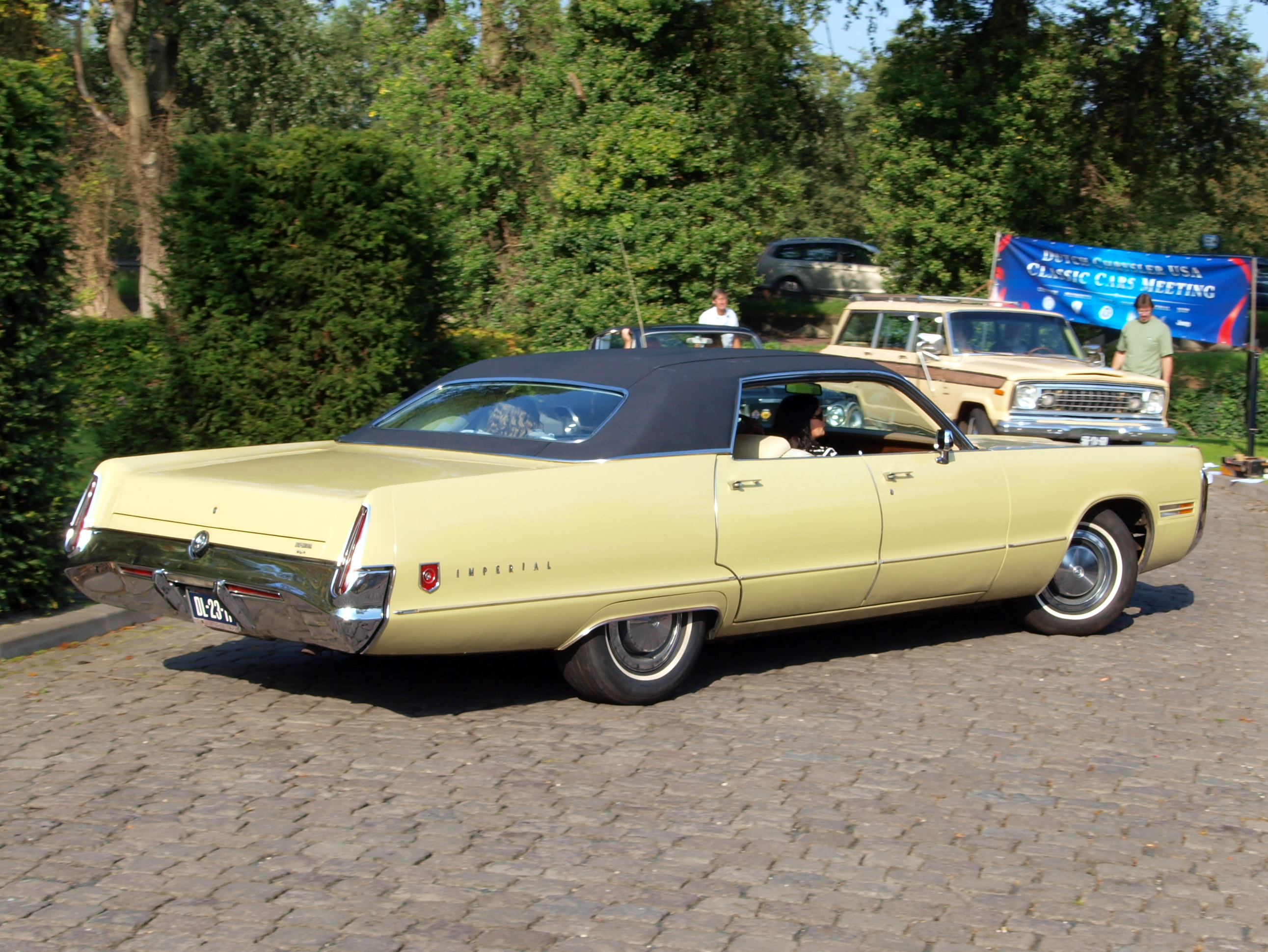
1972 Imperial LeBaron

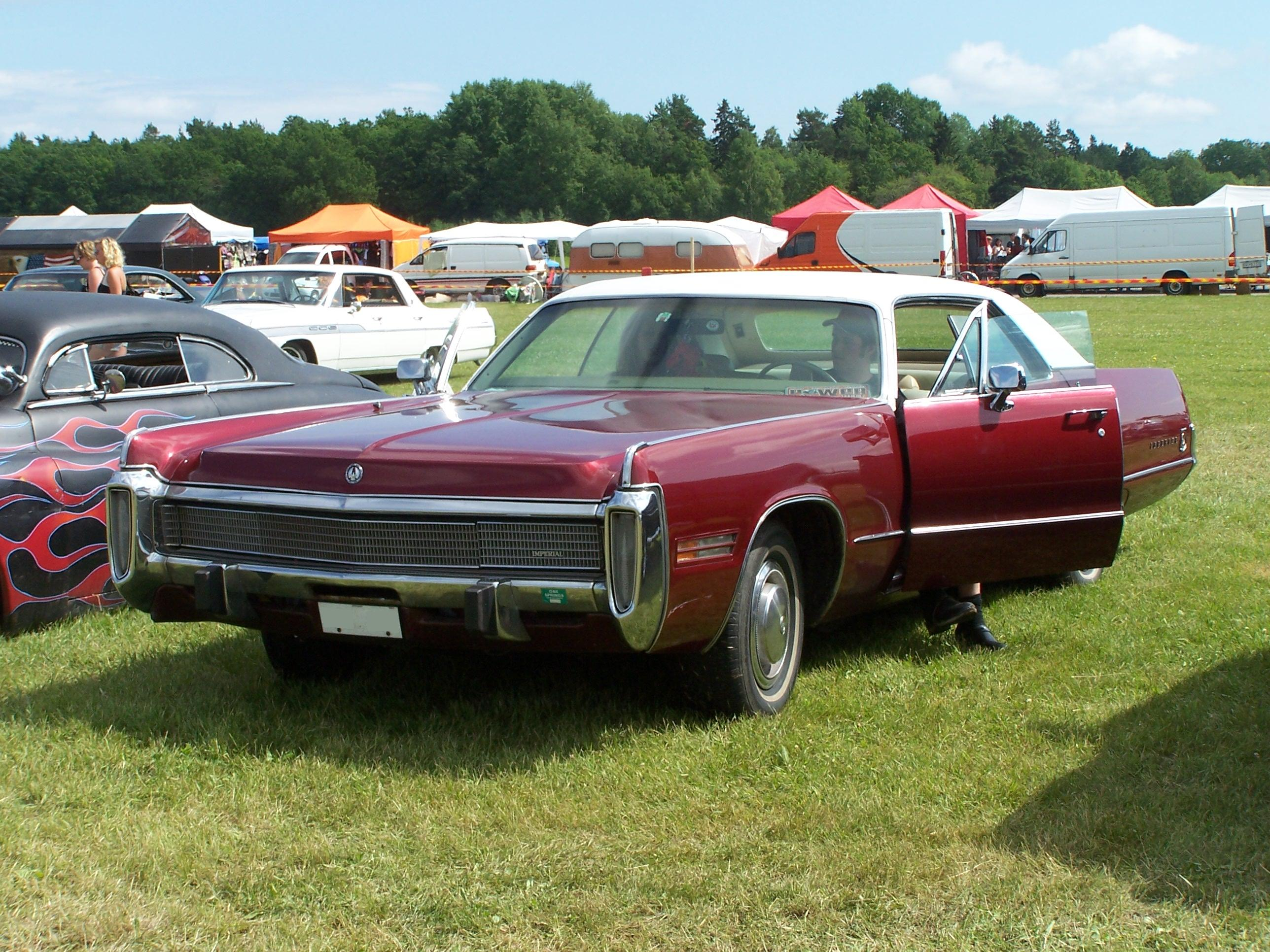
1973 Imperial LeBaron

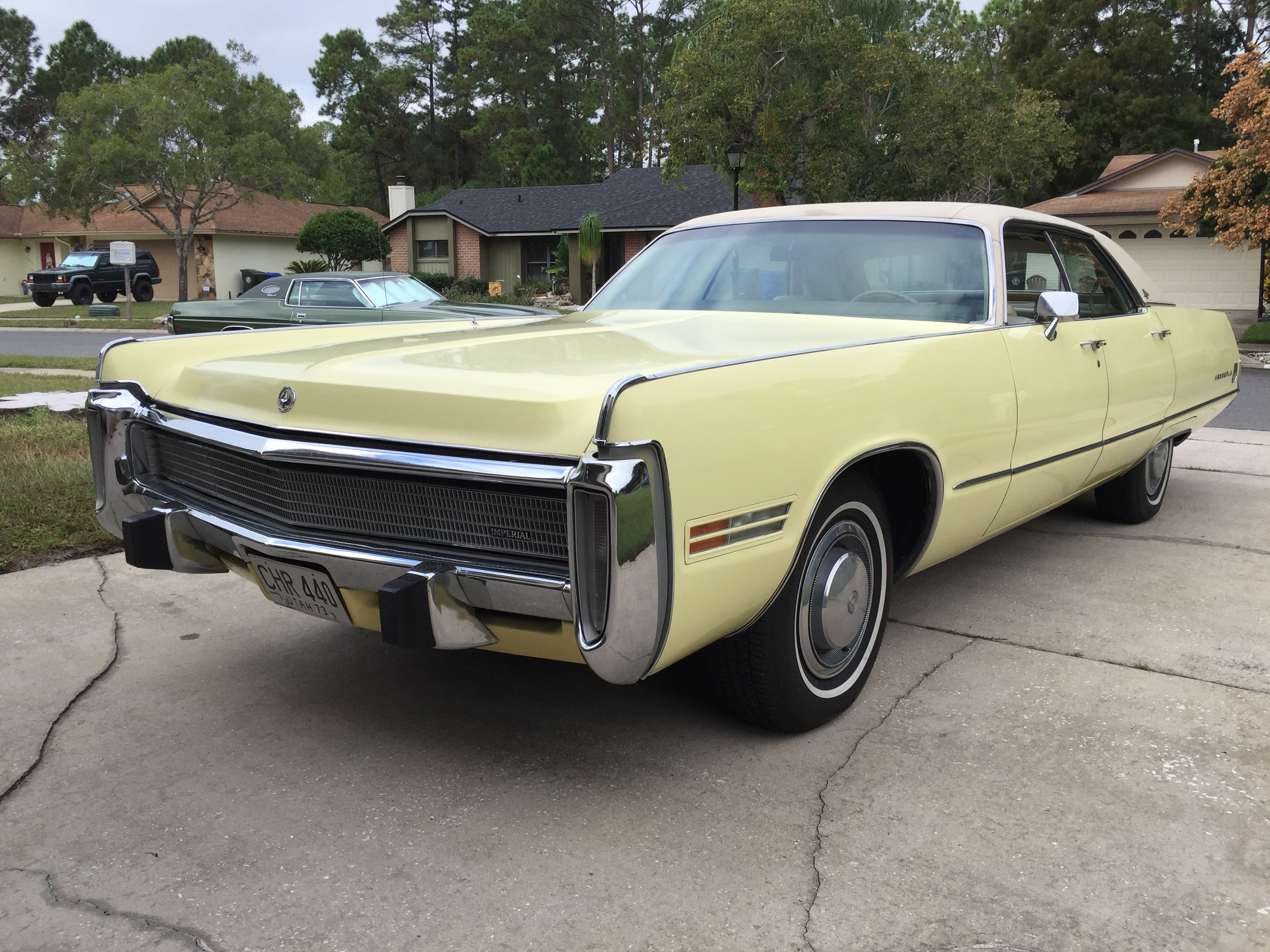
1973 Imperial LeBaron

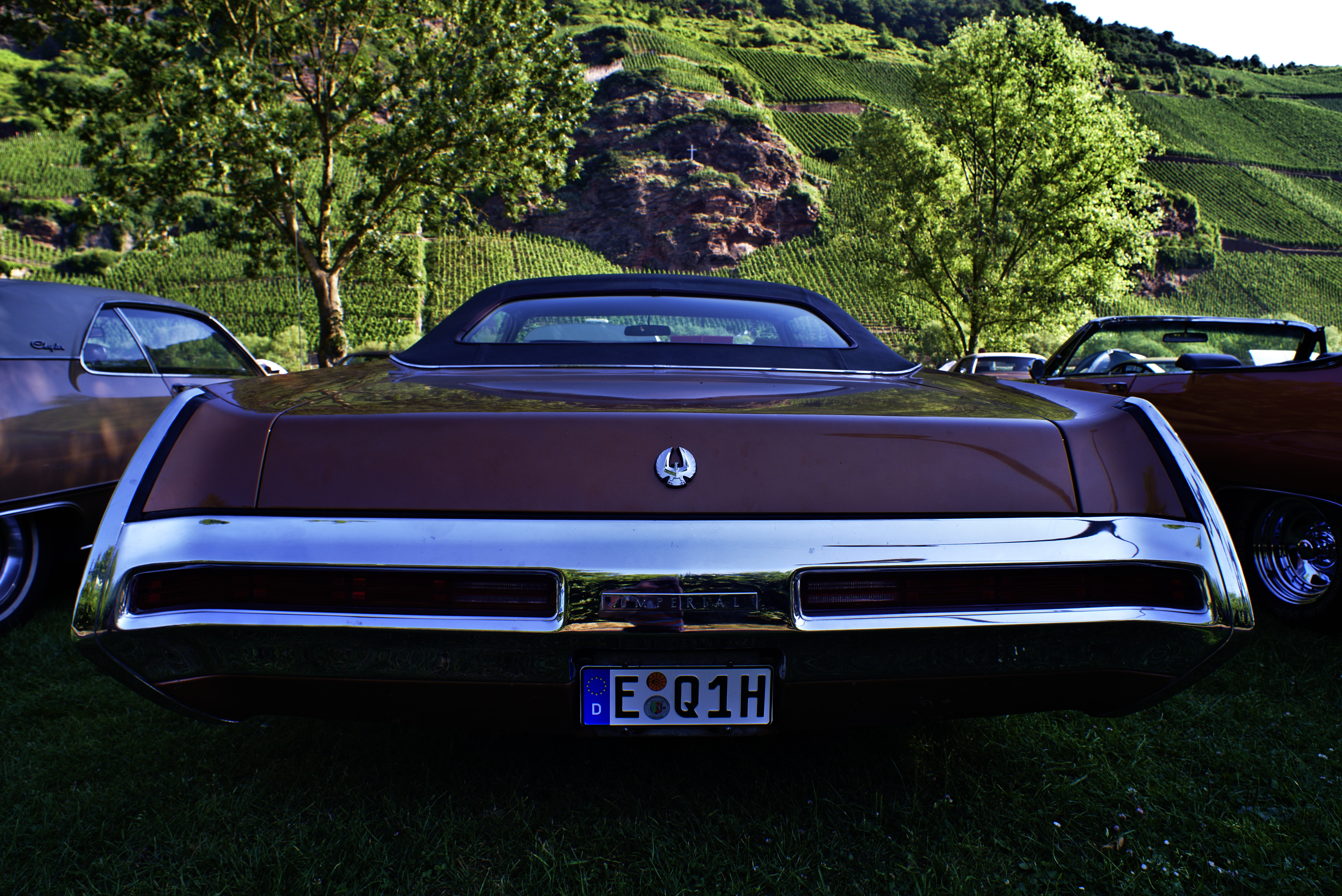
1969 Imperial (back)

== Fifth generation (1974–1975) ==
Fifth generation
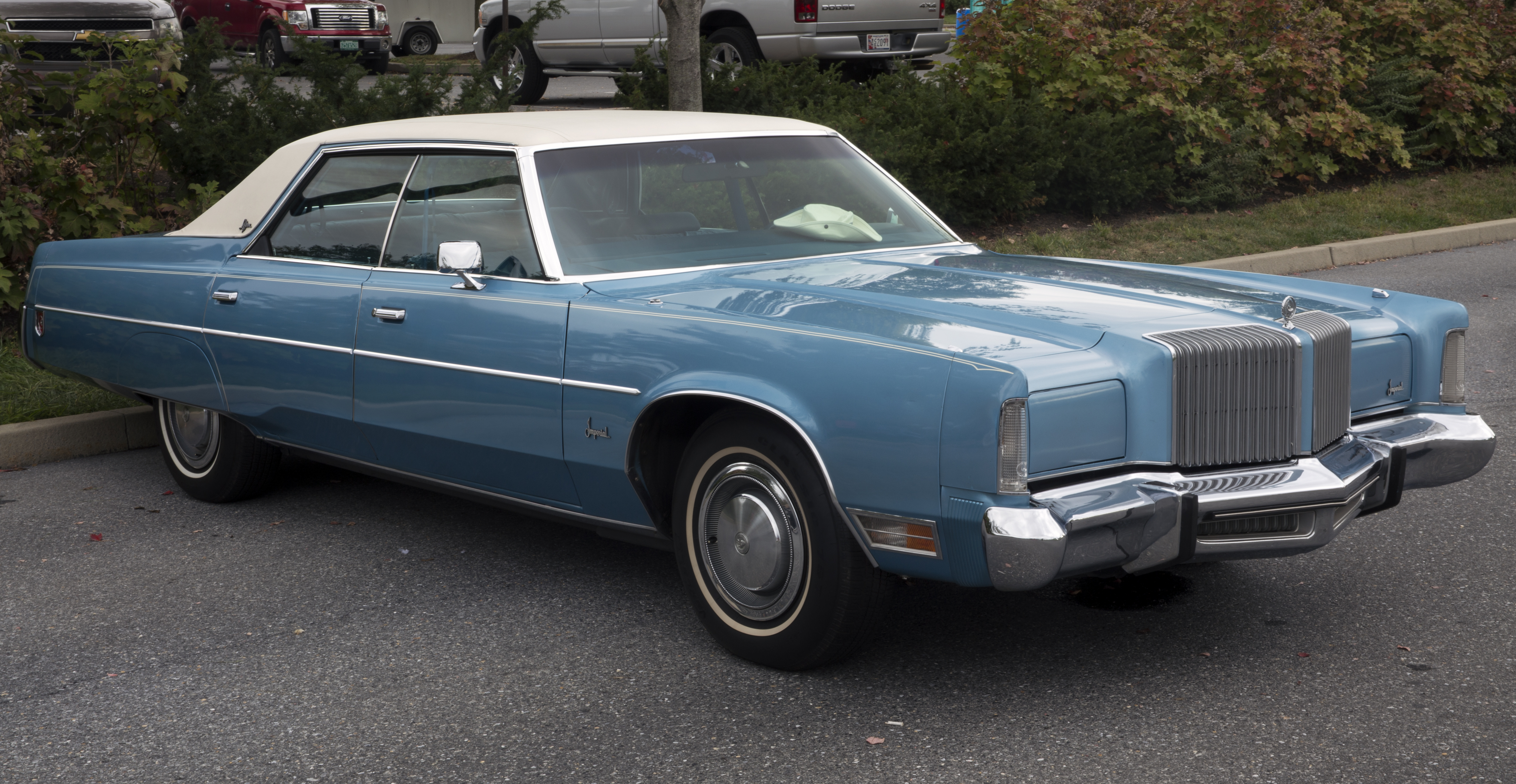
- 1975 Imperial LeBaron

Overview
- Model years: 1974–1975
- Assembly: United States: Detroit, Michigan (Jefferson Avenue Assembly)
- Designer: Elwood Engel

Body and chassis
- Body style: 2-door coupe 2-door hardtop 4-door hardtop
- Platform: C-body
- Related: Chrysler New Yorker; Chrysler Town and Country; Chrysler Newport

Powertrain
- Engine: 440 cu in (7.2 L) Wedge V8
- Transmission: 3-speed TorqueFlite A727 automatic

Dimensions
- Wheelbase: 124.0 in (3,150 mm)
- Length: 1974: 231.1 in (5,870 mm); 1975: 232.7 in (5,911 mm)
- Width: 79.7 in (2,024 mm)
- Height: 1974: 54.7 in (1,389 mm); 1975: 54.5 in (1,384 mm)
- Curb weight: 5,000–5,200 lb (2,300–2,400 kg)

Chronology
- Successor: Chrysler New Yorker Brougham

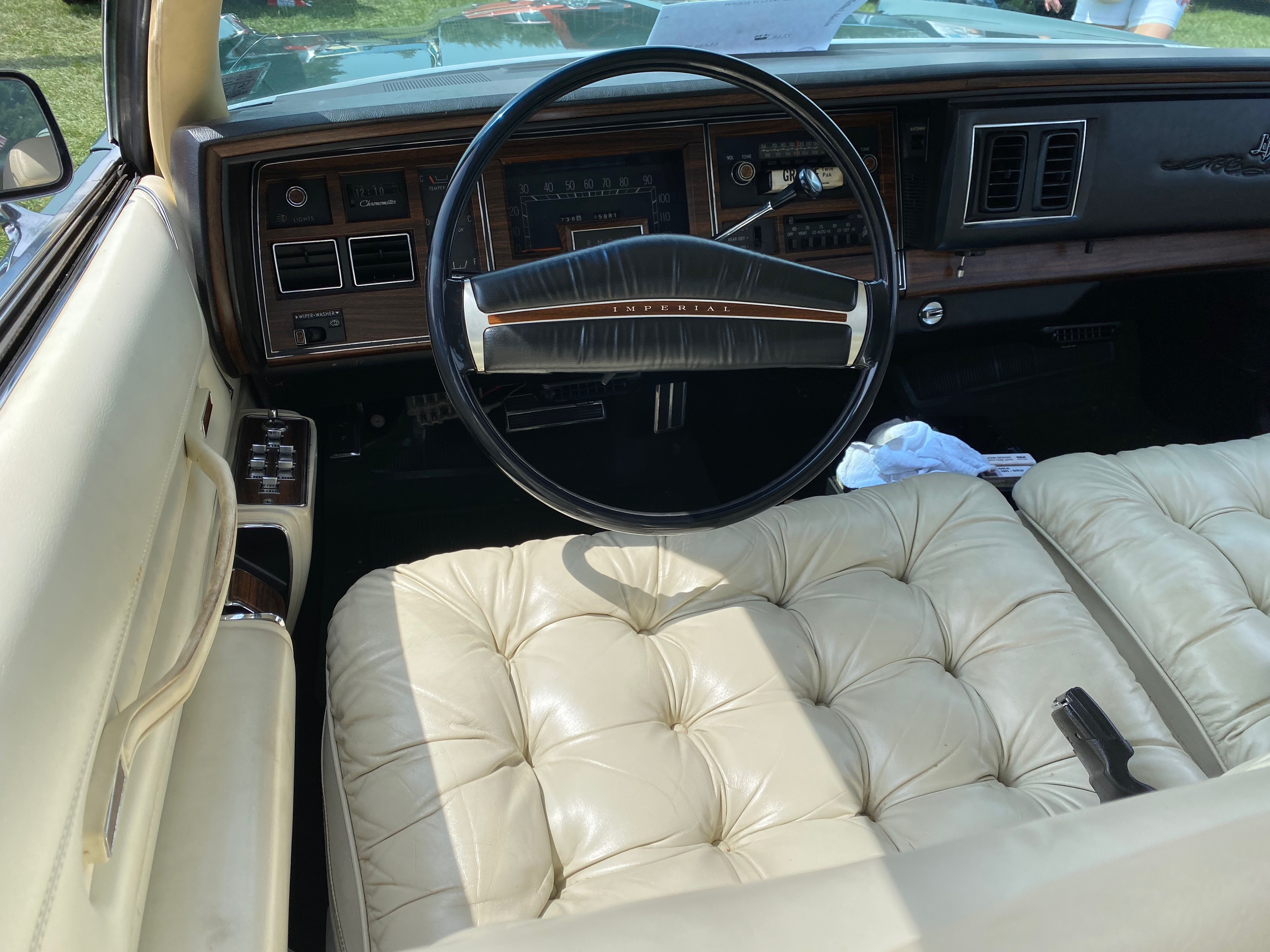
1974 Imperial LeBaron 2-door hardtop interior

With future sales forecasts likely to remain low, Chrysler had planned on discontinuing the Imperial at the end of the 1973 model year. While image and appearance were an important part of luxury car appeal, without sales Chrysler could not afford to build an Imperial with a unique bodyshell. Yet without one, it would be difficult to compete with rivals Cadillac and Lincoln. For 1974, the Crown Coupe nameplate returned as the most expensive model to compete with the Cadillac Eldorado and the Continental Mark IV with a list price of $7,856.

A front-end design envisioned for the next Imperial penned by Chrysler/Imperial exterior studio senior stylist Chet Limbaugh came to the attention of Elwood Engel. It featured a "waterfall" grille with thin vertical chrome bars separated by a body-colored band running through the center, which started on top of the nose and flowed down.

Engel showed the design to Chrysler president John J. Riccardo and convinced him to use it on an Imperial. To save money the 1974 model would use the same body panels as the Chrysler New Yorker except for the front end clip and trunk lid. This meant that for the first time as a separate marque, the Imperial would share the same wheelbase as a production Chrysler.

An impact absorbing front bumper was also new.

=== 1974 (Series 4Y-M) ===
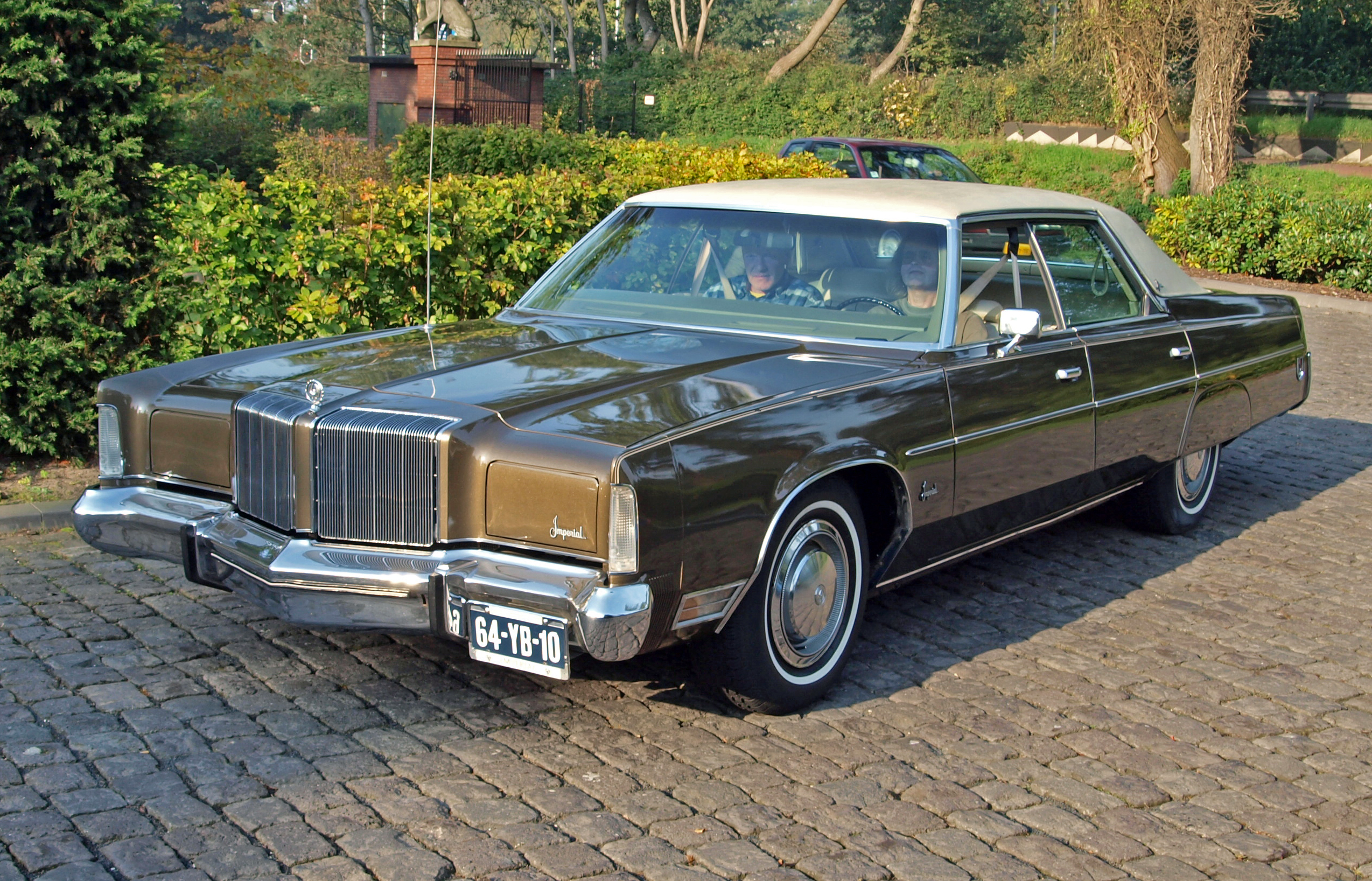
1974 Imperial LeBaron

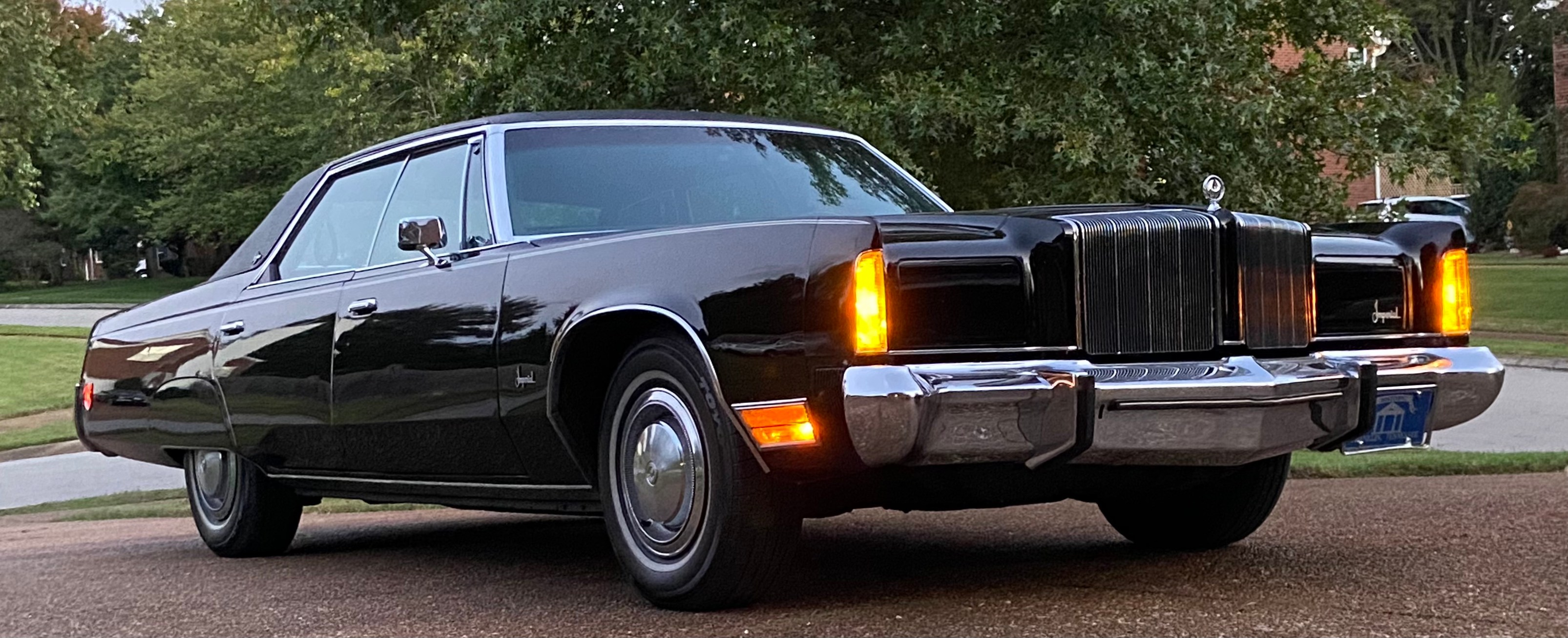
1974 Imperial LeBaron with optional vent windows and courtesy lights activated.

With the full effects of the 1973 oil crisis being solidly felt, a bad year for both the U.S. economy and its auto industry was in store for 1974 - cruel timing for Chrysler's 50th anniversary year. The 1974 Imperial was the first regular American passenger car to offer 4-wheel disc brakes since the 1949–1954 Chrysler Imperials, the 1950–1952 Crosleys and the 1965-on Chevrolet Corvettes. The "by Chrysler" script was removed from the car for 1974. The Imperial's electronic ignition system was a U.S. market first, as was the optional car alarm. In addition to the two regular LeBaron models, a 50th Anniversary 2-door LeBaron Crown Coupe was also produced. Finished in Golden Fawn, only 57 were built. While total sales were down from 1973, Chrysler was pleased with the 14,483 Imperials produced, given the poor economy in 1974 and a retail price of $7,230 for the sedan.

=== 1975 (Series 5Y-M) ===
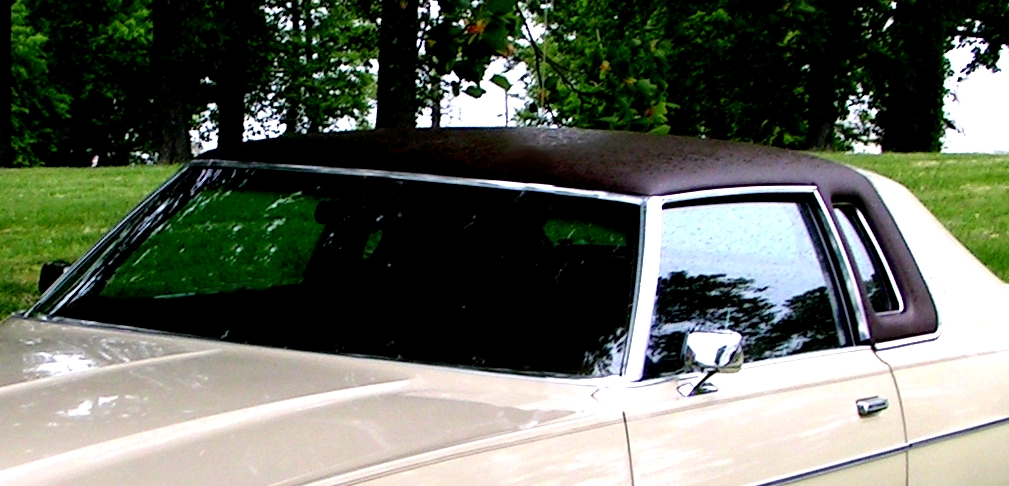
1975 Imperial LeBaron Crown Coupe

A bolder waterfall grille appeared in 1975, one of the few changes for the model year. The front bumper received slots to aid in engine cooling, and a few other detail improvements were made.

This was to be the last model year of the independent Imperial marque, with only 8,830 1975 models sold. This year they brought back the Crown name. Offered only as a coupe, and the major difference is the Crown Coupe came with an opera window compared to the LeBaron regular coupe window. The last Imperial, a black LeBaron hardtop, rolled out of the factory on 12 June 1975. However, only the name disappeared, as the same basic car was offered rather more cheaply, less some of the Imperial's features, as the Chrysler New Yorker Brougham for model years 1976 through 1978.

With divisional cost-savings having forced the Imperial to share basically everything but some trim and badging with the Chrysler New Yorker (and the same platform as all Chryslers and full-sized Dodges and Plymouths), justifying the price differential over a high-end New Yorker had proven increasingly hard for prospective customers, given that the four-door hardtop was listed at $9,046. Compounding this the costs of maintaining and marketing a separate poorly selling marque became too high for the limited return.

== Sixth generation (1981–1983) ==
Series YS
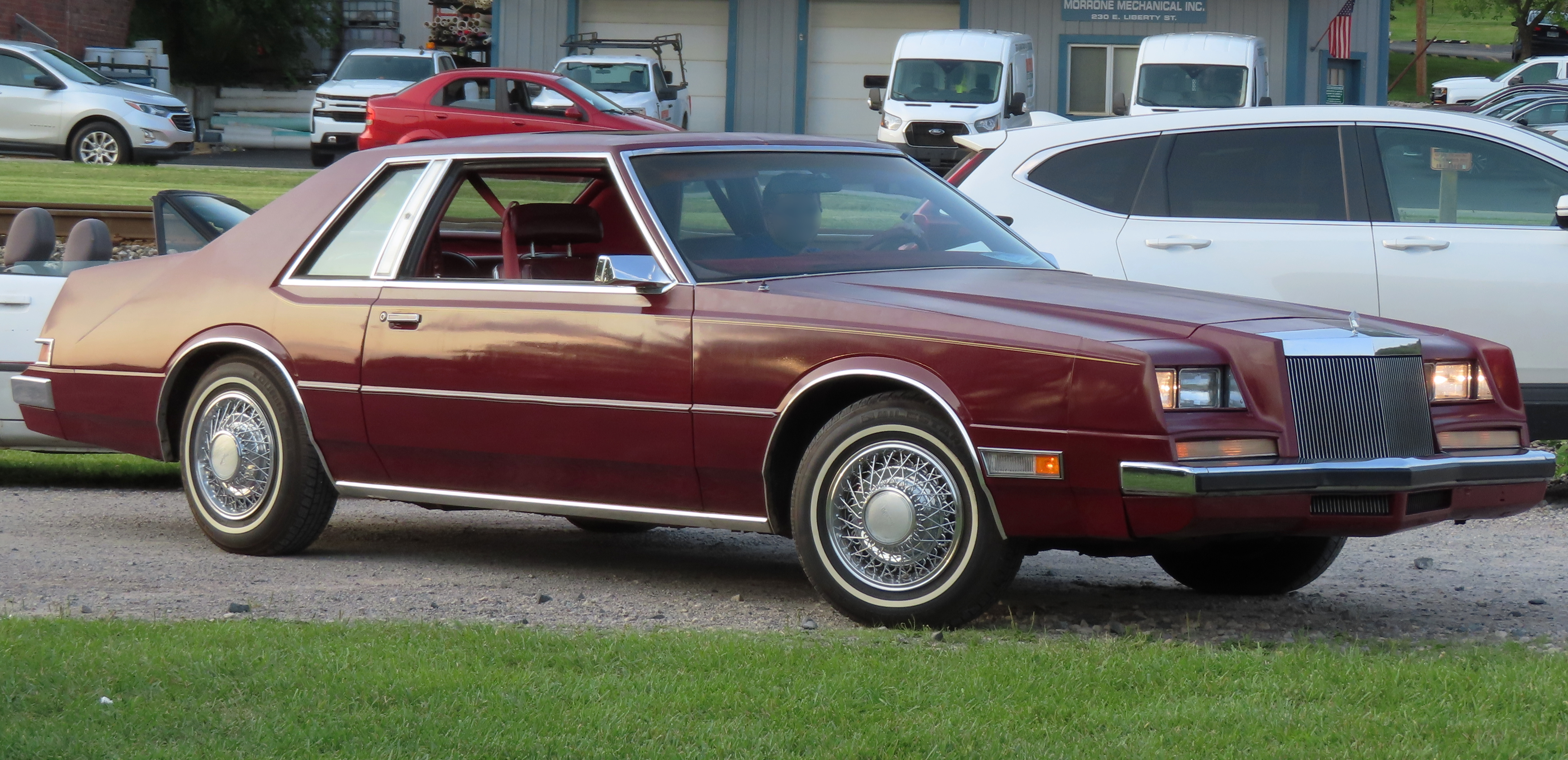
- 1981 Imperial (headlight doors open)

Overview
- Production: 1980–1983
- Model years: 1981–1983
- Assembly: Canada: Windsor, Ontario (Windsor Assembly)
- Designer: Steven N Bollinger

Body and chassis
- Body style: 2-door coupé
- Platform: Chrysler J platform
- Related: Chrysler Cordoba; Dodge Mirada

Powertrain
- Engine: 318 cu in (5.2 L) LA V8
- Transmission: 3-speed A904 automatic

Dimensions
- Wheelbase: 112.7 in (2,863 mm)
- Length: 213.3 in (5,418 mm)
- Width: 72.7 in (1,847 mm)
- Height: 52.6 in (1,336 mm)
- Curb weight: 3,968 lb (1,800 kg)

Chronology
- Predecessor: Chrysler New Yorker Brougham
- Successor: Chrysler TC by Maserati (ideological)

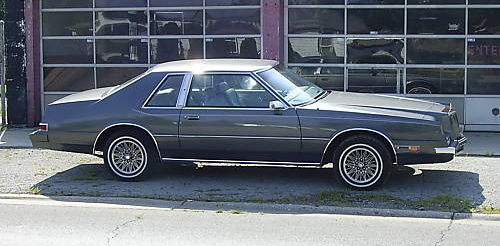
1982 Imperial

Hoping to revive not merely the brand, or the division, but all of Chrysler, the company recruited former top Ford executive Lee Iacocca for its helm. He had proven successful in upscaling the 1967 Thunderbird into the 1969 Continental Mark III positioned on the highest end of the personal luxury car market, and sought to repeat a variant of the formula with the Imperial. Only this time the car would be downsized and de-featured instead of the other way around.

Although Chrysler was facing bankruptcy, Iacocca argued "a new flagship would assure the public that Chrysler had a future." However, when the car finally appeared, a two-door coupé based on the intermediate J platform, it was marketed simply as Imperial, and, harking to Imperial's days as an independent marque of the manufacturer, the Chrysler name did not appear on the car.

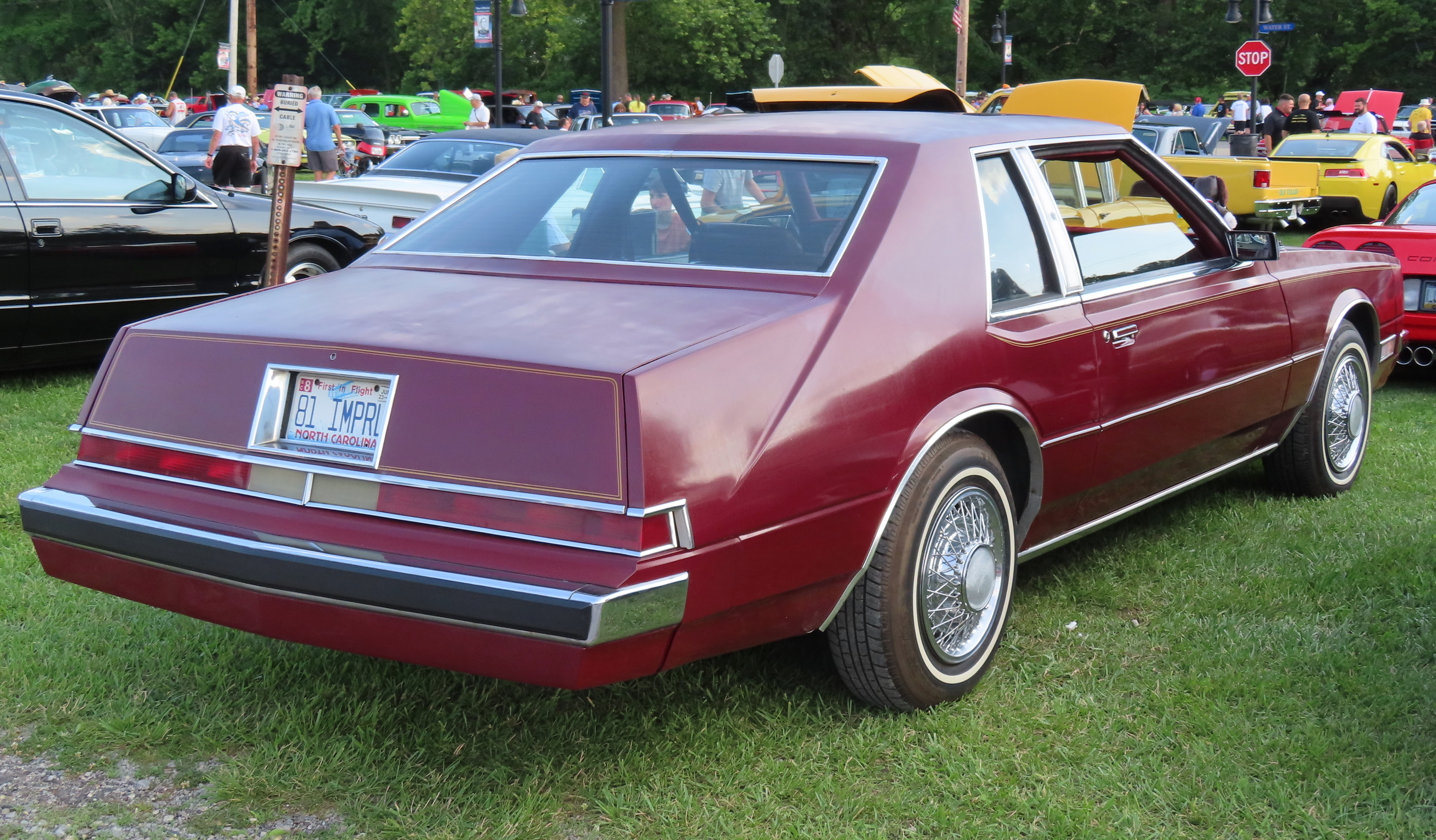
1981–1983 Imperial bustle-back rear styling

There was no four door or full-sized option, the J-platform being shared the second generation Chrysler Cordoba and Dodge Mirada. The bustle-back appearance and prominent grille was an attempt to revive the 1930s and 1940s luxury car appearances that were briefly popular during the early 1980s, as with the second generation Cadillac Seville. Chrysler designers drew inspiration from the 1937–1939 Chrysler Imperial sedans.

The traditional Imperial eagle logo was not used, as it had been moved to the Chrysler LeBaron model in 1977. Instead, it bore a Chrysler Pentastar hood ornament made of Cartier crystal.

Competing models such as the Cadillac Eldorado and the Continental Mark VI had been downsized by 1981, so the Imperial was of comparable size to its competitors with a listed retail price of $18,311 ($64,846 in 2025 dollars). A marketing effort for the new model included commercials and magazine ads featuring singer Frank Sinatra, a personal friend of Iacocca whom Sinatra jokingly referred to as "the other chairman of the board." Sinatra even recorded special songs to promote the new Imperial. In addition, Sinatra agreed to work for Chrysler for $1 a year because he believed that more performers should get involved in helping to save jobs in the United States (though his union later forced him to accept scale pay instead).

The Imperial's front suspension featured transverse-mounted torsion bars; the rear suspension included asymmetric multiple-leaf, S-shaped springs, anti-sway bar, and telescopic shock absorbers. Extensive use of rubber isolators contributed to the Imperial's virtually silent ride on top of Goodyear polyester steel-belted Arriva tires. The Imperials carried a market-leading 24-month/30,000-mile limited warranty covering all labor, maintenance, and parts (except tires).

For the new Imperial, a quality-assurance center was built adjacent to the Windsor plant where the car was assembled. Each car, which had already been subjected to multiple inspections while it was assembled, was then given additional testing. First was an underbody fluid-leak inspection utilizing a high-pressure water spray, the car was checked for front-end alignment, and finally a 5.5-mile (9 km) road test over a track that included various types of terrain. The cars received a sign-off if everything was in order.

"Imperial is a special car for a special owner," said Tom Pappert, Chrysler's Vice President of U.S. Automotive Sales. "It is designed to appeal to the personal luxury car buyer seeking the highest level of prestige, advanced styling, engineering and special features, extended warranty, and VIP recognition in both the showroom and service areas."

=== 1981 ===
The 1981 Imperial came with a long list of standard features including air conditioning with thermostatic temperature control, electronic fuel injection, power windows, power door locks, power seats, power outside mirrors, power trunk release, tilt steering column, automatic speed control, garage door opener, and other conveniences. Options included a cost-free choice of wheels (color-coordinated 'snowflake' cast-aluminum wheels or steel wire wheel covers), upholstery choices including Mark Cross leather (see below) and Yorkshire cloth, sound systems choice, 40-channel CB radio, power moon roof, and the Frank Sinatra Edition package (see below).

Unique for the Imperial was the first fully electronic digital instrumentation ever provided in a production-built American automobile. The Imperial's electronic information center was manufactured at Chrysler's Huntsville, Alabama Electronics Division, which was also a prime contractor in America's Redstone and Saturn Apollo space programs. Located in the center of the instrument panel were nine push-buttons the driver was to touch to operate Imperial's information center. The instrument panel displayed an electronic blue-green VFD readout which also featured gear selection.

The Imperial was available in eleven exterior colors (Sterling Silver Crystal Coat; Day Star Blue Crystal Coat; Nightwatch Blue; Light Auburn Crystal Coat; Mahogany StarMist; Light Seaspray Green Crystal Coat; Spice Tan Starmist; Manila Cream; Morocco Red; Pearl White; Formal Black), and six cloth and seven leather interior colors (Dark Blue; Green; Red; Mahogany; Heather; Cashmere; White for leather only). In all, thirty-five interior color and trim combinations were possible.

=== 1982 ===
The Imperial continued to offer an extensive list of standard luxury and convenience items for 1982 although some changes were made. Imperial's "floating cushion" velour seats were replaced with ones of Kimberly velvet one-piece construction. New "Quartz-Lock" electronically tuned radios (ETR) were added to the options list while the power moonroof was no longer available.

=== 1983 ===
Following significant price increases during the 1981 and 1982 model years, due in part to high inflation at the time, the Imperial's base price was cut back close to its original introductory level. The hood ornament, while similar in appearance, was changed from Cartier crystal to plastic. The Frank Sinatra Edition package was no longer available. A suspension upgrade Touring Edition package was added.

The sixth generation Imperial did not meet Chrysler management's sales and reliability expectations. It had innovations such as the fuel injection system and electronic instrument cluster, and Chrysler tried to use it as a showcase for technology and quality. The fuel injection system proved troublesome and a number of 1981 models were retrofitted under warranty (or later on owner initiative) with carburetors.

The Imperial name would reappear in 1990, but as the flagship sub-brand Chrysler Imperial model.

=== Powertrain ===
The 318 cu in (5.2 L) V8, was the only available engine, with standard fitment of a Chrysler-built throttle-body EFI system. The automatic transmission was a wide-ratio TorqueFlite equipped with lock-up torque converter, with the final drive ratio 2.2:1 in 1981 and 1983; 2.4:1 in 1982.

engine displacement, type, fuel system	max. motive power at rpm	max. torque at rpm	transmission
318 cu in (5,204 cc) LA V8; EFI	140 hp (104 kW) at 4,000	245 lb⋅ft (332 N⋅m) at 2,000	3-speed TorqueFlite A904 automatic

=== Special trims ===
==== Frank Sinatra (fs) Edition ====
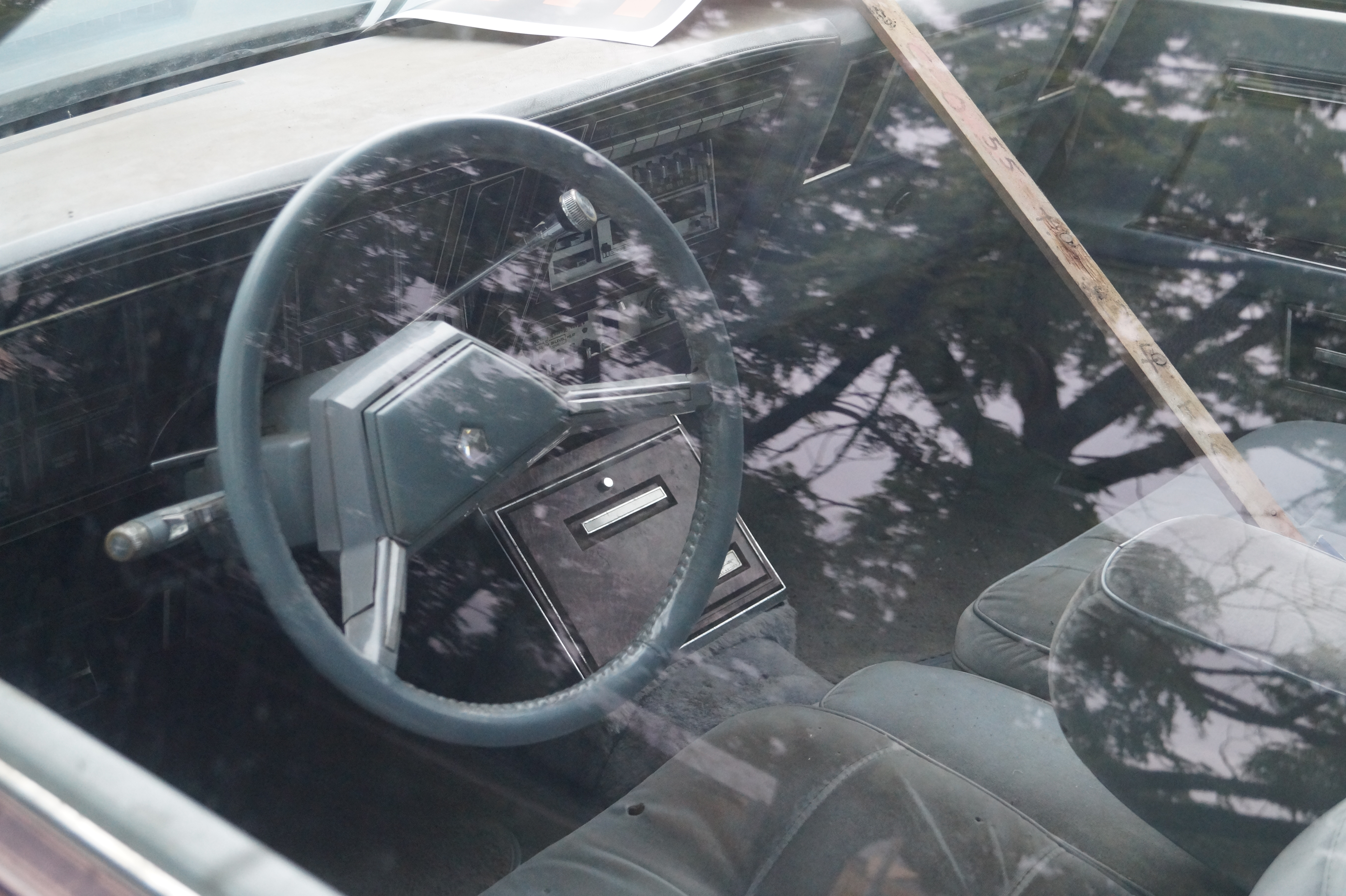
1981 Imperial Frank Sinatra Edition interior

The Imperial for 1981 and 1982 was offered with an optional edition named after a celebrity. The Imperial fs was one of few regular production cars bearing a celebrity's name. It was available only in Glacier Blue Crystal paint - Chrysler advertising claimed it matched the color of Sinatra's eyes - and had special "fs" (lowercase) external badging, with a large glovebox placard proclaiming "Frank Sinatra Signature Edition". Inside, 16 cassette tapes of Sinatra titles were presented in a specially made Mark Cross leather case stored in a special locking console below the dashboard. Production in 1981 was 148 and 279 in 1982 fs edition were made that were an additional $1,078 above the $20,988 ($74,326 in 2025 dollars) price of the car.

==== Limousine ====
Aside from the fs edition available for purchase by the public, Chrysler president Lee Iacocca commissioned a 1982 Imperial converted by ASC (American Sunroof Corporation) outside Detroit, Michigan, using the front doors from a 1979-81 Chrysler Fifth Avenue sedan into a limousine with a 36 in (910 mm) stretch, and presented it to Frank Sinatra as a gift. A similar Imperial limousine also built by ASC is also used in the 1984 movie Cannonball Run II driven by Burt Reynolds and Dom DeLuise, as well as the movies Sharky's Machine and Stick both directed by and starring Reynolds.

==== Cartier Crystals ====
All 1981 through 1983 model year Imperials had Cartier crystals placed on the exterior opera lights and steering wheel, and each crystal displayed 'Cartier.' In addition, each Imperial came with a Cartier crystal key in the Mark Cross Gift Set.

==== Mark Cross Interior & Gift Set ====
All 1981 through 1983 model year Imperials had the interior designed by Mark Cross, an American luxury leather goods brand. The seating came in either Kimberly cloth or Leather. Upon purchasing a new Imperial, Chrysler shipped the new owner a Mark Cross Gift Set consisting of an umbrella, leather portfolio, leather key fob, uncut Cartier key, and a 'Sounds of Stereo' music cassette. These were exclusive Mark Cross items not available for sale in a Mark Cross showroom.

=== NASCAR ===
A few race teams built NASCAR spec racecars with Imperial sheetmetal and raced them on the NASCAR Winston Cup Series circuit from 1981 through the 1985 season, though mostly only on the superspeedways. They were driven by Buddy Arrington, Rick Baldwin, Cecil Gordon, Phil Goode, and Maurice Randall. The cars did not distinguish themselves to any great degree, however a Buddy Arrington owned and driven Imperial finished in sixth place in the summer 1982 race at Michigan International Speedway in Brooklyn. The Imperial-based cars were used in competition as it was determined to be far more aerodynamic (and capable of higher speeds) than the Dodge Mirada at the time. The car had a drag coefficient of 0.41, which was better than the contemporary Corvette (0.45), and performed well on the big high speed tracks, with Morgan Shepherd (driving Buddy Arrington's Imperial) qualifying for the 1985 Daytona 500 at a speed of 197 mph, despite the lack of suitable high-performance race engines. One of Arrington's Imperials is in the Talladega, Alabama NASCAR museum.

=== Production figures ===
The first 1981 Imperial rolled off the assembly line on August 11, 1980. Imperial production ended on April 29, 1983. Chrysler had originally planned to cap production at 25,000 units.

Production figures
calendar year	units
1980*	6,241
1981	3,466
1982	1,746
1983	932
total production = 12,385

^{*}Cars manufactured in 1980 calendar year were sold as 1981 model year.

== Imperial limousines ==
=== Imperial Crown (1955–1965) ===
Imperial Crown
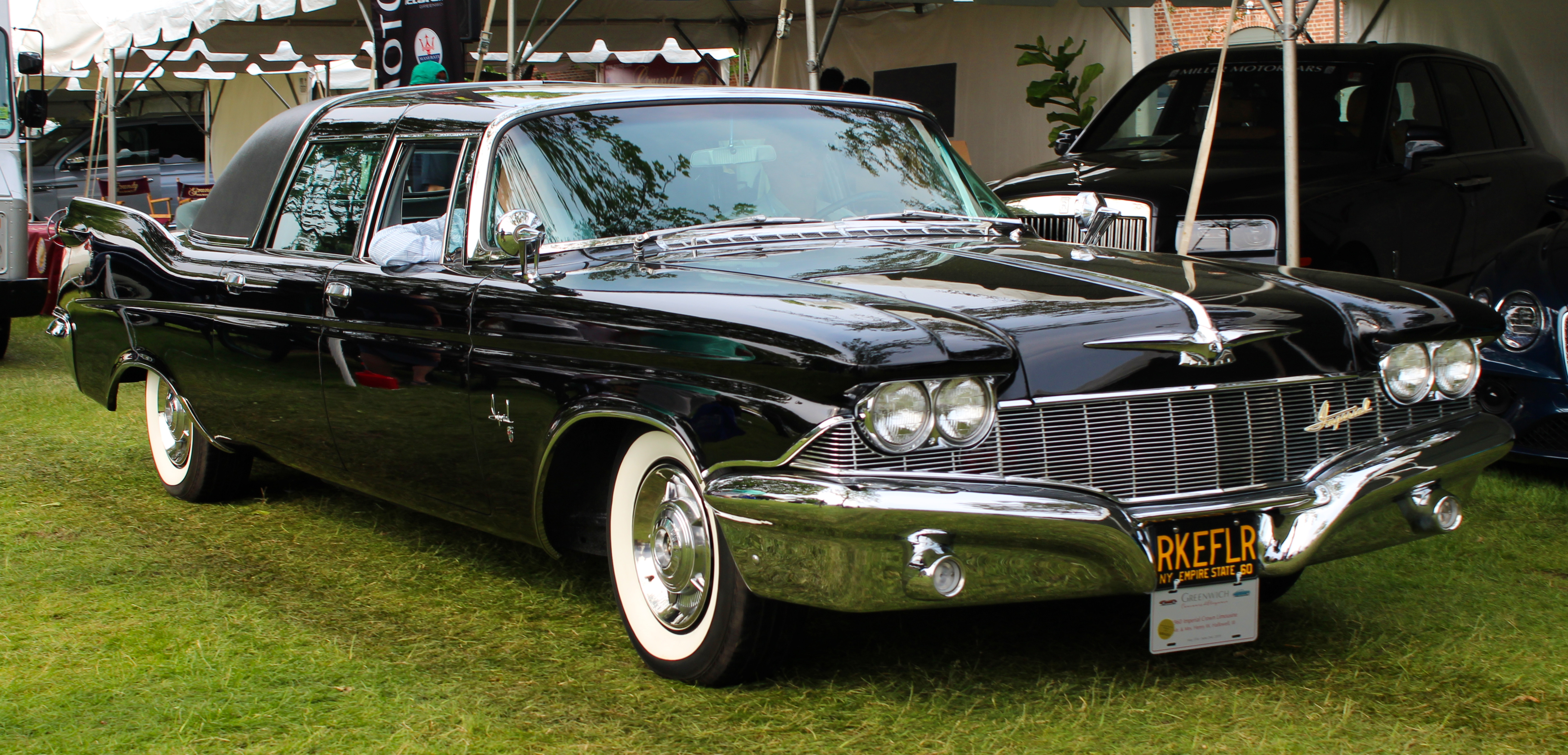
- 1960 Imperial Crown Limousine

Overview
- Production: 1954–1965
- Model years: 1955–1965
- Assembly: United States: Detroit, Michigan (Jefferson Avenue Assembly: 1955–1956)
- Designer: Virgil Exner and Elwood Engel

Body and chassis
- Body style: 4-door limousine
- Platform: D-body (1957–1965)

Powertrain
- Engine: 331 cu in (5.4 L) Hemi V8; 354 cu in (5.8 L) Hemi V8; 392 cu in (6.4 L) Hemi V8; 413 cu in (6.8 L) Wedge V8
- Transmission: 2-speed PowerFlite automatic 3-speed TorqueFlite A488 automatic 3-speed TorqueFlite A727 automatic

Dimensions
- Wheelbase: 149.5 in (3,797 mm)
- Length: 1955: 242.5 in (6,160 mm); 1956: 246.1 in (6,251 mm); 1957: 244.9 in (6,220 mm); 1958: 246.4 in (6,259 mm); 1959–61: 246.8 in (6,269 mm); 1963–65: 248.3 in (6,307 mm)
- Width: 1955: 79.1 in (2,009 mm); 1956: 78.8 in (2,002 mm); 1957: 81.2 in (2,062 mm); 1958: 81.3 in (2,065 mm); 1959: 81.0 in (2,057 mm); 1960-61: 80.1 in (2,035 mm); 1963: 81.7 in (2,075 mm); 1964–65: 80.0 in (2,032 mm)
- Height: 1955–56: 62.5 in (1,588 mm); 1957–65: 58.5 in (1,486 mm)
- Curb weight: 5,300–6,300 lb (2,400–2,900 kg)

Chronology
- Predecessor: Chrysler Imperial Crown

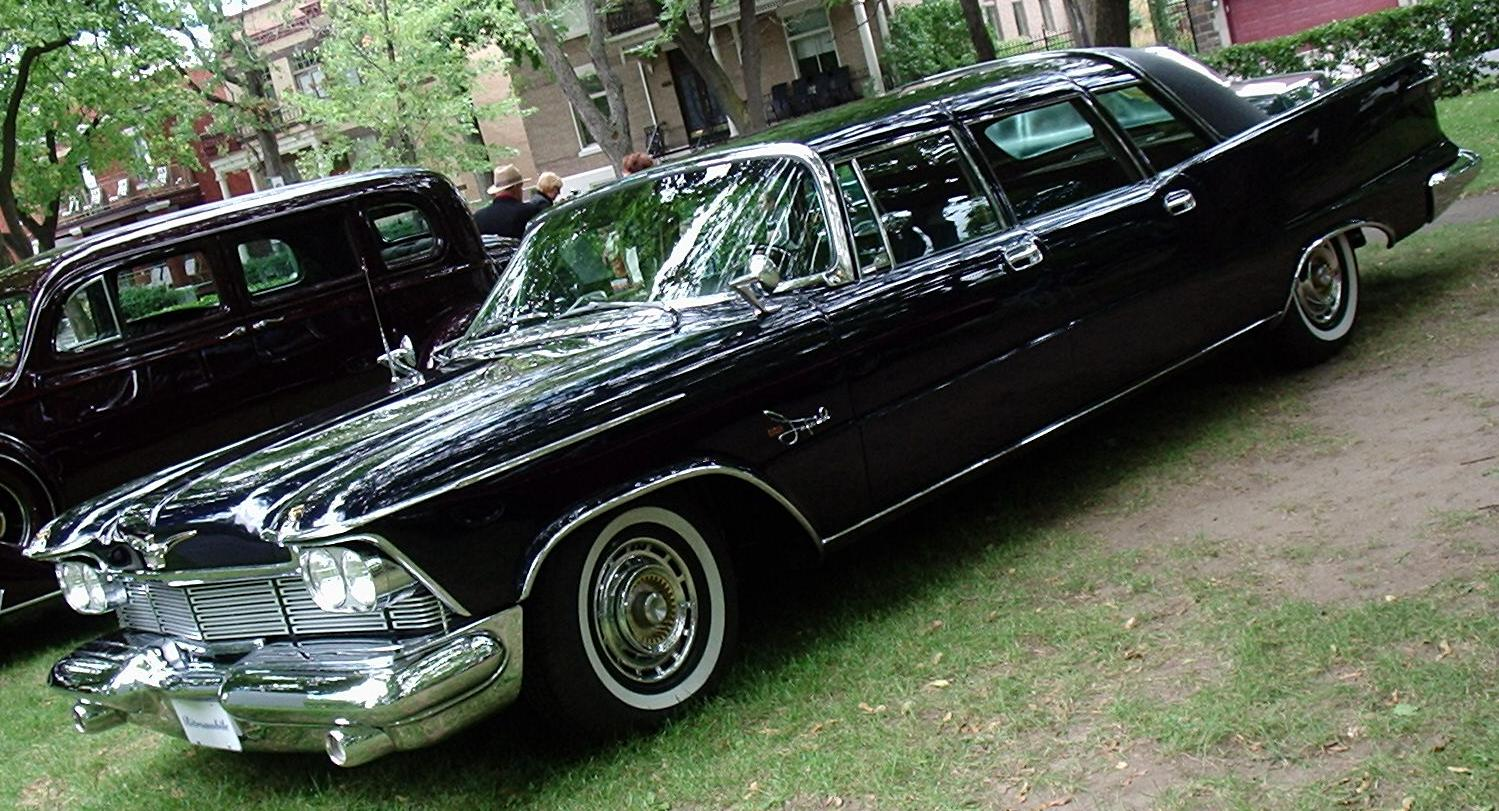
1958 Imperial Crown Ghia Limousine

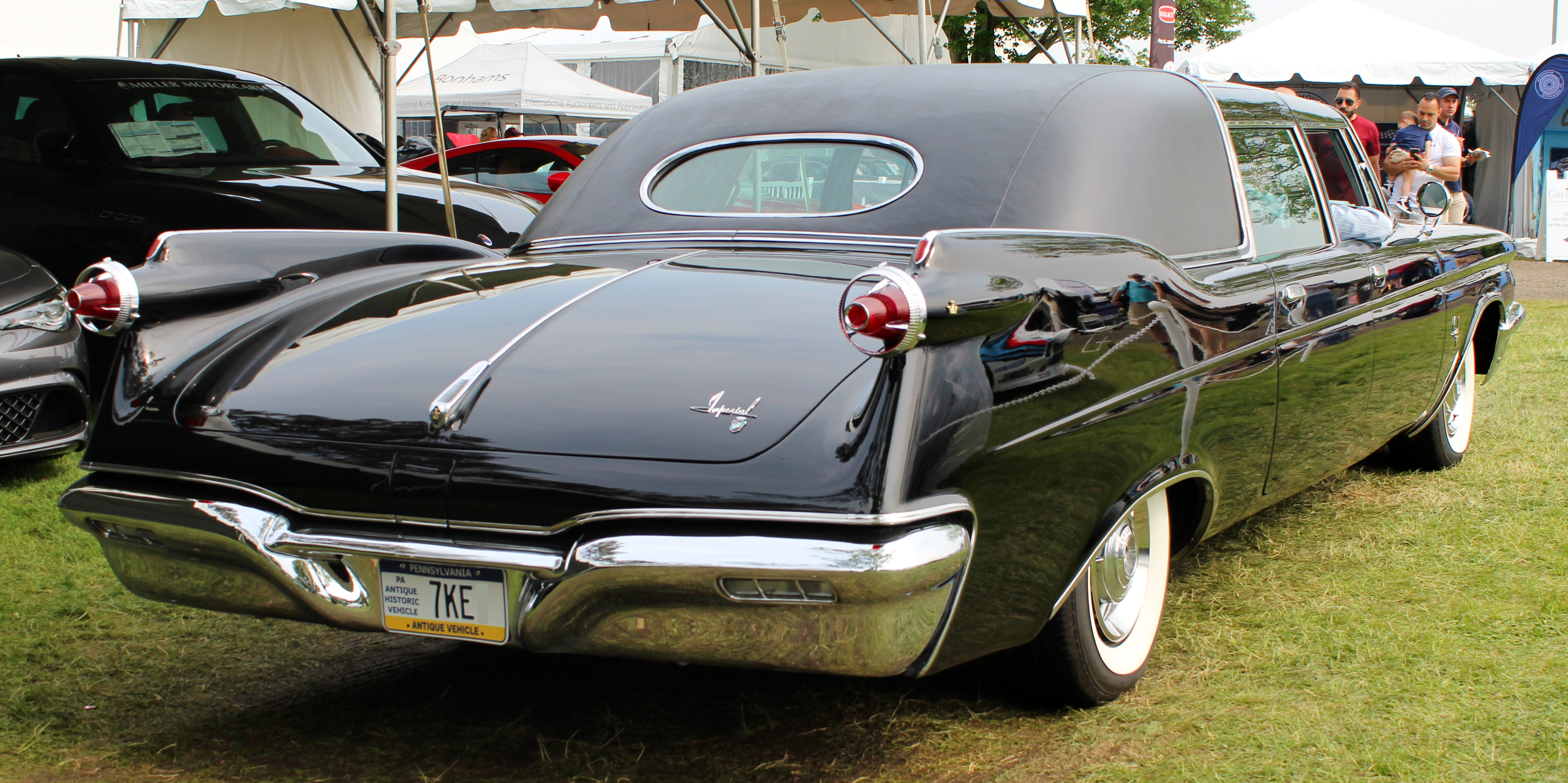
1960 Imperial Crown Limousine rear

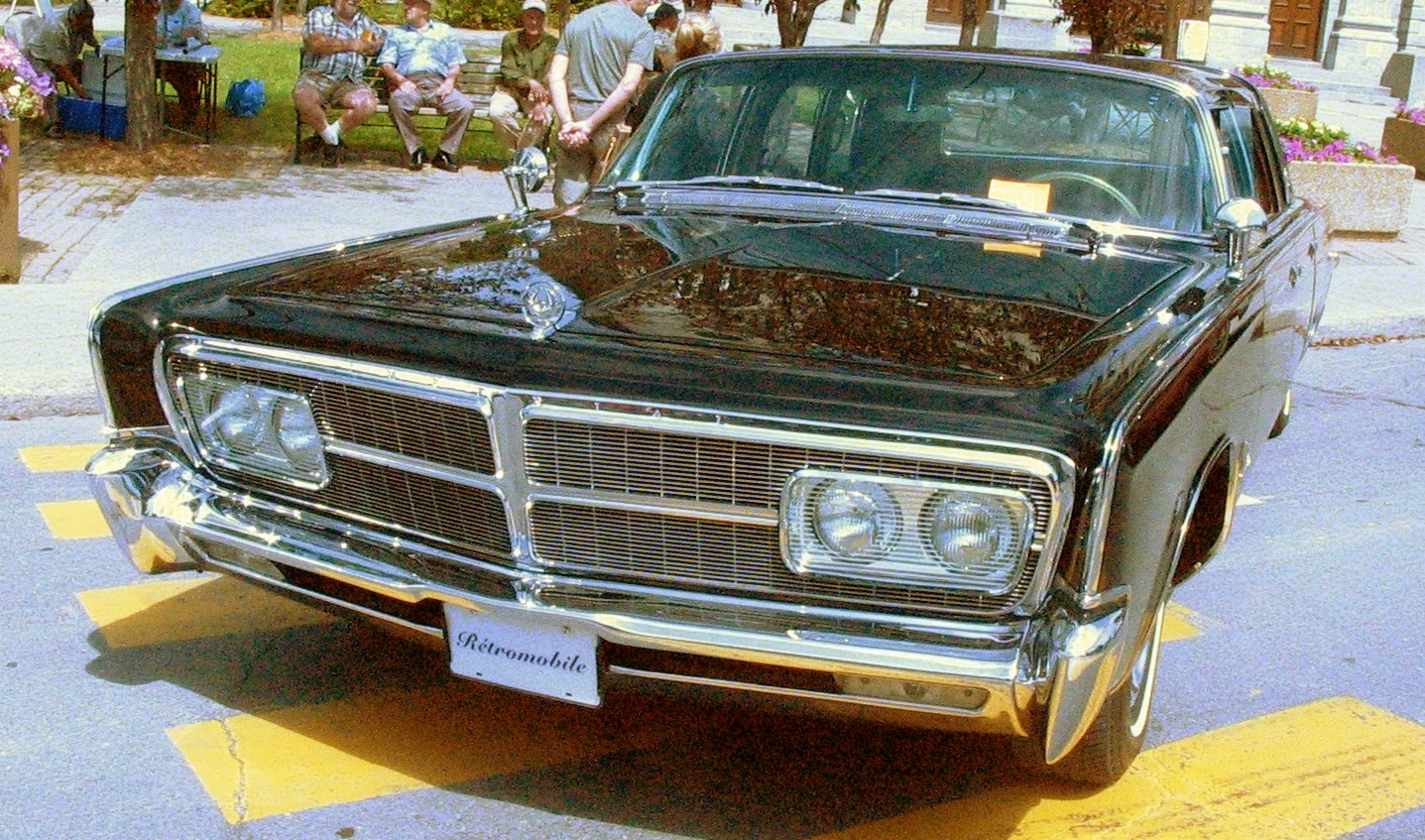
1965 Imperial Crown Ghia Limousine

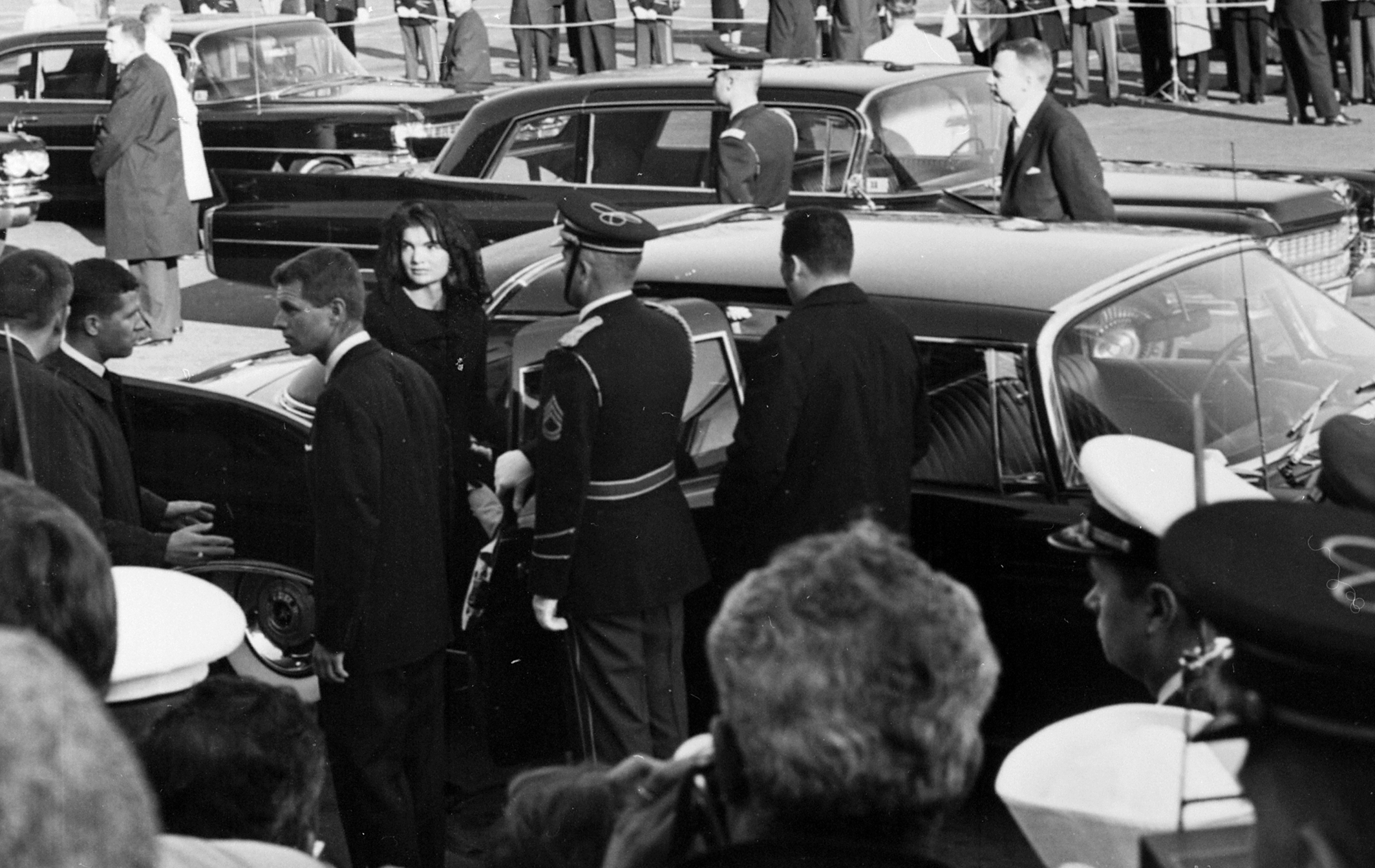
Jacqueline Kennedy, standing near Robert F. Kennedy, about to enter her 1960 Imperial Crown limousine after the funeral of President John F. Kennedy at St. Matthew's Cathedral

For 1955 and 1956, an Imperial Crown limousine model was also offered. With an extra 19.5 in (500 mm) and 16.5 in (420 mm) of wheelbase in 1955 and 1956 respectively, and seating eight (three in the front including the driver, three in the rear, and two on rearward-facing fold-down jump seats), these replaced the long-wheelbase offerings in all Chrysler marques. A total of 172 were built for (model year) 1955, with 226 for 1956. They were the last Chrysler-branded limousines built entirely in Detroit. Color choices were limited to dark green, dark blue, maroon or black with wire wheels being the only optional equipment offered.

From 1957 through 1965, long-wheelbase Imperial Crown cars would be finished by Ghia in Italy and was formally introduced January 2, 1957. The earlier models used two-door hardtop bodies mounted on the more rigid convertible chassis; these would be shipped across the Atlantic, cut apart, lengthened by 20.5 inches (521 mm) and reworked. Later models were built from four-door models to the same specification. Each took a month to build and carried a high price for the time of US$18,500 in 1963-64. They sold in limited numbers against the less expensive Cadillac Series 75 (US$9724–$9960 in 1963-64), but had an established reputation among limousine buyers, as well as against competing coachbuilders building on the Cadillac commercial chassis. Packard had ended production in 1958 and both the Mercedes-Benz 300d and the Rolls-Royce Silver Cloud had just been introduced. A total of 132 Imperial Crowns were manufactured for Chrysler by Ghia over 1957-65. An oddity is that these cars were often built as soon as the styling changed, and sold over a period of some years. All 1961 Imperial Crown Ghias used the 1960 styling front and rear, for example, and all 10 Ghia built Imperial Crowns sold during the 1965 model year were 1964s with 1965 exterior styling and consequently had a TorqueFlight pushbutton gear selector. At about 6,200–6,300 lb (2,800–2,900 kg) curb weight the 1957-65 Ghia built Imperial Crowns are the heaviest standard production cars sold by an American firm since the 1930s.

Throughout her husband's term as U.S. President, Jacqueline Kennedy's personal car was a Ghia-built 1961 Imperial Crown with 1960 styling. The car figured prominently in her various duties as First Lady. In President John F. Kennedy's funeral procession on November 25, 1963, near the front of the motorcade, carrying Jackie and her children, was her Imperial Crown.

New York governor and heir to the Standard Oil fortune Nelson Rockefeller, later Vice President of the U.S. during the term of President Gerald Ford, also owned a 1960 Imperial Crown. It is one of 17 limousines made by Ghia in that year, and the only one with blind rear quarter treatment.

In the 1974 movie The Godfather Part II, a black Ghia built 1958 Imperial Crown was used by Michael Corleone (played by Al Pacino) while at the family compound near Reno, Nevada.

=== Imperial Crown (1967–1971) and Imperial (through 1983) ===
While Imperial Crown limousines production ended in 1965, Imperial limousines continued to be made by other coachbuilders. After the last ten Ghia-built Imperial Crowns were completed, Ghia sold its tooling to Barreiros Coachbuilders of Spain. Barreiros built ten limousines, much like those built by Ghia and, similar to the last ten built by Ghia, built as 1965s with 1966 exterior styling, but with a wheelbase two inches longer. Build quality was poor by comparison, with the cars famous for having a wiring harness made from wires of the same color. This effort was made with Chrysler's cooperation, but Chrysler did not advertise them as official Crown Imperials; that model was not offered by the factory in 1966.

For the model years 1967 through 1971, a total of 27 Imperial limousines were produced by Stageway Coachbuilders (ASC) of Fort Smith, Arkansas, on a 163.0 in (4,140 mm) wheelbase, and were justifiably advertised as the largest luxury automobiles in the world. These were the official Imperial Crown models. Armbruster-Stageway was a well-established builder of such customized products as airport limousines, and Chrysler had been collaborating with the firm for years. The last of these was built in 1969, though leftover units were updated with 1970 and 1971 grilles and taillights, and sold during those model years. They closed out the Imperial Custom /Imperial Crown tradition in fine style.

Two 1972 models with 1973 model year grilles were built by the Hess and Eisenhardt Company of Fairfield, Ohio, for the United States Secret Service and were used by Presidents Nixon, Ford, Carter, and finally Reagan on his swearing-in day. One 1974 model year Imperial was produced into a limo also by ASC. The final Imperial limousines were 1981–83 bodied cars, two of which were stretched by 24 inches (610 mm) and five were lengthened by 36 inches (910 mm).

Imperial Crown limousines should not be confused with the Imperial Crown and Crown Coupe models. The Crown Imperial Limousine was the top of the line, and fitted with LeBaron trim or better, while the Imperial Crown was the middle-tier line through 1968 and bottom of the Imperial line in 1969 and 1970.

== Imperial advertising slogans ==
- "America's Most Carefully Built Car"
- "The Finest Car America Has Yet Produced"
- "Finest Product of Chrysler Corporation"
- "The Incomparable Imperial"
- "Excellence Without Equal"
- "It's Time for Imperial" (1981–1983)

== See also ==
- Chrysler Imperial
