= Chrysler 300 letter series =

High-performance luxury cars built in very limited numbers

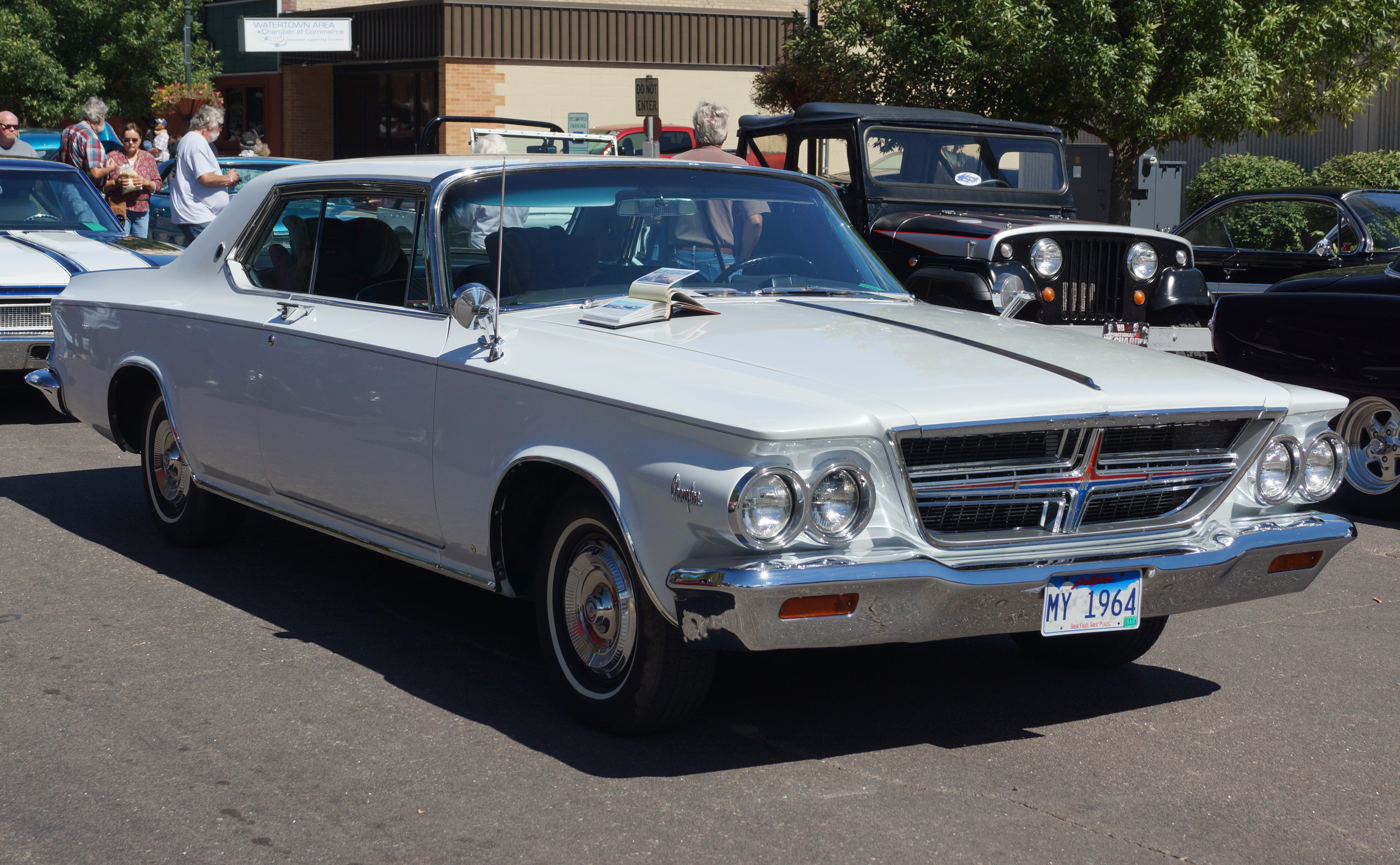
- 1964 Chrysler 300-K Coupe

Overview
- Manufacturer: Chrysler Corporation
- Production: 1955–1965; 1970
- Assembly: United States: Detroit, Michigan (Jefferson Avenue Assembly)

Body and chassis
- Class: Personal luxury car Muscle car Grand tourer
- Layout: Front-engine, rear-wheel-drive

Chronology
- Predecessor: Chrysler Saratoga
- Successor: Chrysler 300 non-letter series

The Chrysler 300 "letter series" are high-performance personal luxury cars that were built by Chrysler in the U.S. from 1955 to 1965 and were a sub-model from the Chrysler New Yorker. After the initial year, which was named C-300 for its standard 300 hp (220 kW) 331 cu in (5.4 L) FirePower V8, the 1956 cars were designated 300B. Successive model years were given the next letter of the alphabet as a suffix (skipping "i"), reaching the 300L by 1965, after which the model sequence was discontinued while the "300" remained. At its introduction it was advertised as "America's Most Powerful Car".

The 300 "letter series" cars were among the vehicles built by Chrysler after World War II that focused on performance, and thus can be considered the beginning of the muscle car, though full-sized and more expensive. Chrysler had a long history of producing race car products going back to the Chrysler Six that was entered in the 1925 24 Hours of Le Mans, 1928 24 Hours of Le Mans, 1929 24 Hours of Le Mans, and the Chrysler Imperial Eight roadster in the 1931 24 Hours of Le Mans. The 1955 C-300 and the 1956 300B were raced with very little modification at NASCAR races to include Watkins Glen International where it won races multiple times.

The automaker reintroduced the 300 designations again for performance-luxury sedans in 1999, using the 300M nameplate from 1999 to 2004, and expanding the 300 series with a reintroduction of a new Hemi-engineered V8 installed in the 300C, the top model of a new Chrysler 300 line, a new rear-wheel drive car launched in 2004 for the 2005 model year.

== First generation ==
=== 1955 C-300 ===
Chrysler C-300 (C68-300)
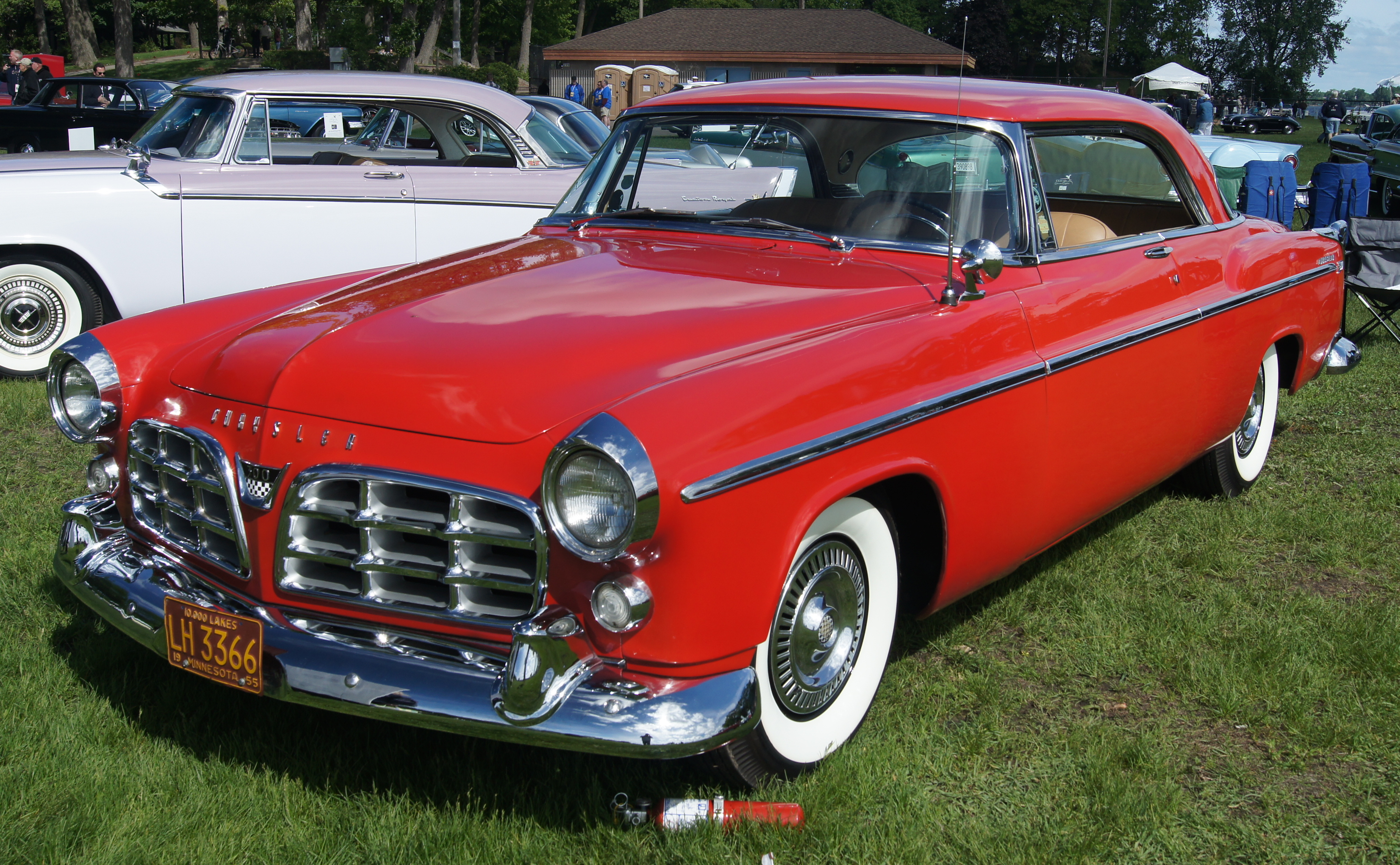

Overview
- Production: 1955; 1,725 produced
- Designer: Virgil Exner (chief engineer); Robert MacGregor Rodger

Body and chassis
- Body style: 2-door hardtop
- Chassis: body-on-frame
- Related: Chrysler New Yorker; Dodge D-500; Imperial Newport (concept car); Chrysler Norseman

Powertrain
- Engine: 331 cu in (5.4 L) FirePower V8
- Transmission: 2-speed PowerFlite automatic

Dimensions
- Wheelbase: 126 in (3,200 mm)
- Length: 218.8 in (5,558 mm)
- Width: 79.1 in (2,009 mm)
- Curb weight: 4,005 lb (1,817 kg)

This first of the letter series cars did not bear a letter, but can retroactively be considered the '300A'. The 'C-' designation was applied to all Chrysler models and the coupe was built on the C-68 New Yorker Series. For marketing purposes the car was called the "300" in order to further reinforce the 300 hp (220 kW) engine installed. The C-300 was a racecar aimed at the NASCAR circuits that was sold for private ownership to qualify for homologation purposes, with Chrysler's most powerful engine, the OHV 331 cu in (5.4 L) FirePower "Hemi" V8, due to the hemispheric shape of the cylinder head, fitted with dual four barrel carburetors, two overhead valves per cylinder with solid valve lifters, a race-profiled camshaft installed inside the engine cylinder block, stiffer front and rear suspension, and a low restriction performance exhaust system. This engine was exclusive to the 300, the New Yorker and the all-new Imperial Newport. By 1956, this would be the first American production car to top 355 hp (265 kW), and the letter series was for many years the most powerful car produced in the United States. The engine and transmission were shared with the French automaker Facel Vega in the Facel Vega Excellence and the Cunningham C-4R which was entered at the 1954 24 Hours of Le Mans and finished the race. With the growing popularity of European sports cars during the late 1940s, Chrysler sought to create a "drivers car" with sports car performance but with greater attention to comfort. in the growing post-WWII tradition of grand tourers.

The car's "100-Million Dollar Look" styling can be attributed as much to the Chrysler parts bin as designer Virgil Exner. The front clip, including the grille, was taken from the Imperial of the same year, but the rest of the car did not look like an Imperial. The midsection was from a New Yorker hardtop, with a Windsor rear quarter. Exner also included base-model Chrysler bumpers and removed many exterior elements such as back-up lights, hood ornament, side trim, and exterior mirrors. An electric clock and two-speed windshield wipers were standard. There were few options available including selection of three exterior colors of Black, Tango Red or Platinum White and only one color of tan leather interior. Power windows and power front seat adjustment were available but air conditioning was not available in 1955.

Measured at 127.58 mph (205.32 km/h) in the Flying Mile, and doing well in NASCAR, the C-300 aroused interest that was not reflected in its modest sales figure of 1,725, and the listed retail price of US$4,100 ($49,276 in 2025 dollars).

When the C-300 competed in NASCAR, it was painted to advertise that it was the "world's fastest stock car". In February 1954 the Mercedes-Benz 300 SL was introduced and sold in North America and was labeled the fastest production car of its time. The Chrysler C-300 was also introduced at the same time the BMW 503 was introduced and sold in North America. The Bentley Continental with a similar approach to driving experience was introduced in 1952.

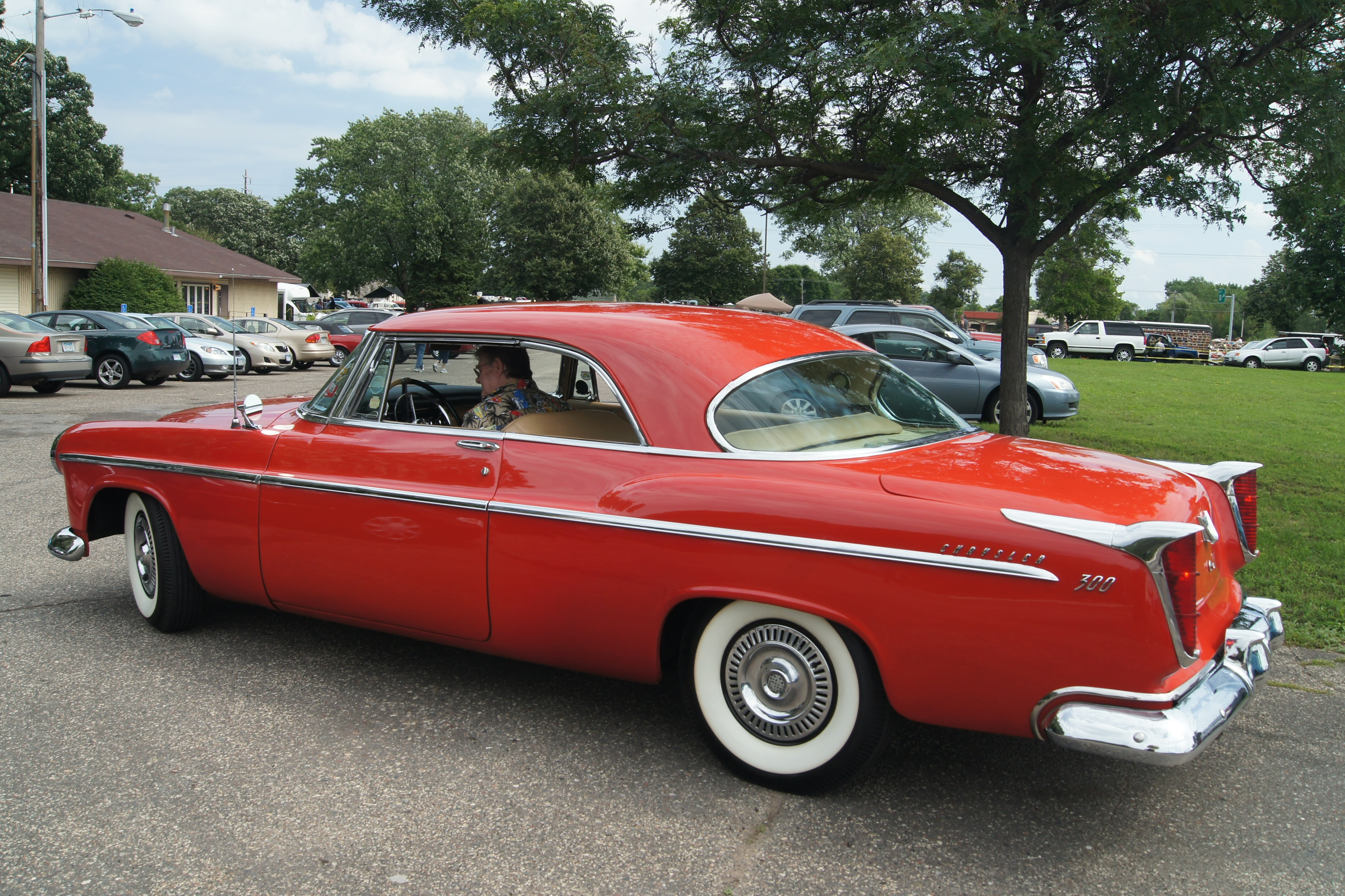
1955 Chrysler C-300 rear

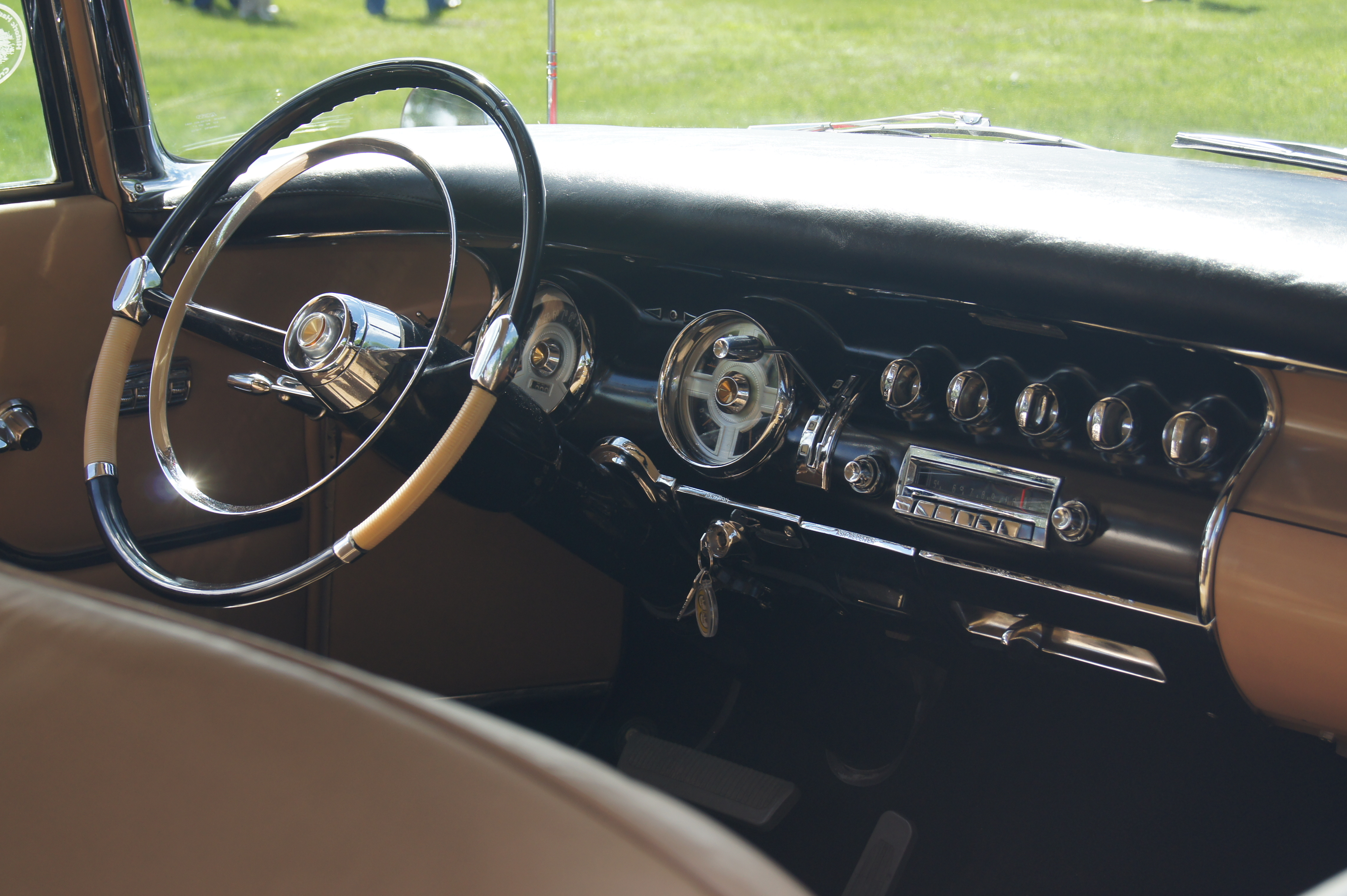
1955 Chrysler C-300 interior

=== 1956 300B ===
Chrysler 300B (C72-300)
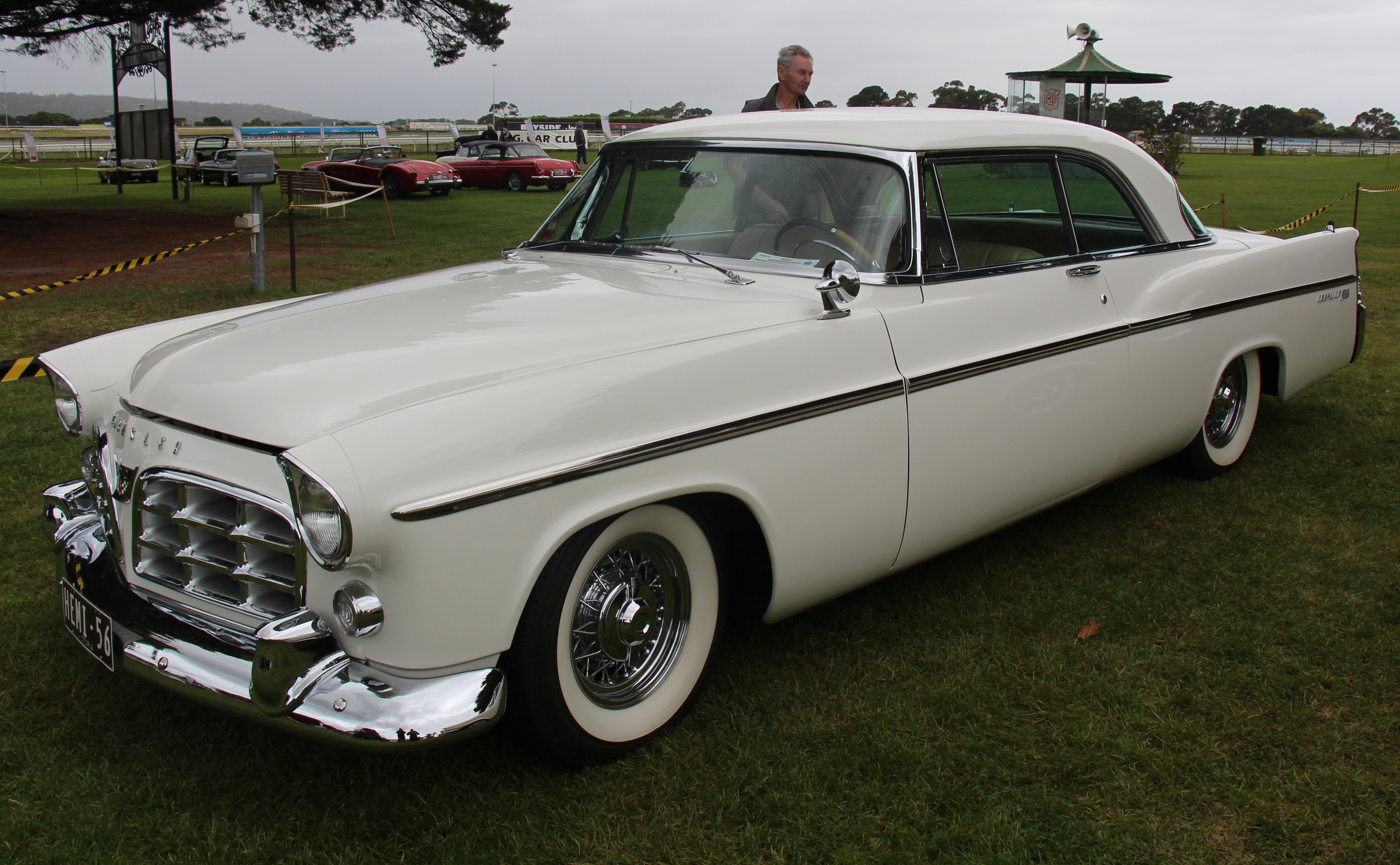

Overview
- Production: 1956; 1,102 produced
- Designer: Virgil Exner (chief engineer); Robert MacGregor Rodger

Body and chassis
- Body style: 2-door hardtop
- Chassis: body-on-frame
- Related: Chrysler New Yorker; Imperial Southampton; DeSoto Adventurer; Dodge D-500; Plymouth Fury

Powertrain
- Engine: 354 cu in (5.8 L) FirePower V8 (340 hp or optional 355 hp option)
- Transmission: 3-speed TorqueFlite automatic; 3-speed manual

Dimensions
- Wheelbase: 126 in (3,200 mm)
- Length: 221 in (5,613 mm)
- Width: 79.1 in (2,009 mm)
- Curb weight: 4,145 lb (1,880 kg)

The 1956 300B was fairly similar externally, distinguished by a new tailfin treatment, but with larger engines, and a choice of two versions of the 354 cu in (5.8 L) Hemi V8 producing either 340 or 355 hp (254 or 265 kW), with a 10:1 compression ratio used to achieve the higher horsepower rating. A companion of this generation was introduced as the DeSoto Adventurer and the Dodge D-500 that were less luxurious, while still sharing much of the mechanicals, giving DeSoto and Dodge a performance enhanced model, while the 354 CID engine was exclusive to the 300, New Yorker and Imperials. The TorqueFlite transmission controls were to the left of the steering wheel and a total of 1,102 were sold. Performance was better than the previous year's by its top speed at almost 140 mph (225 km/h) at the Daytona Flying Mile. A 6.17 ratio rear differential was also added to the options. Front leg room was 44.6 inches. New was the Highway Hi-Fi phonograph player. This was the last year that coil springs were used for the front suspension.

With the optional 10:1 compression ratio, brake horsepower became 355 hp (265 kW) from the same 354 cu in (5.8 L) engine, and the 300B became the first American car to produce 1 horsepower per cubic inch, besting Chevrolet with their fuel-injected 283 cu in (4.6 L) by one year. Colors were updated to Regimental Red, Cloud White and Black while the tan leather interior remained.

NASCAR team owner Carl Kiekhaefer's raced the 300B, among other cars, and won 22 out of 41 races, including 16 races consecutively; One of his racers was famous racer Buck Baker, who drove 300B's. Kiekhaefer would purchase cars from Chrysler and modify a few appearance features but essentially raced the cars as they were, with leather interior and other standard features, on the racetrack. The listed retail price was $4,242 ($50,234 in 2025 dollars).

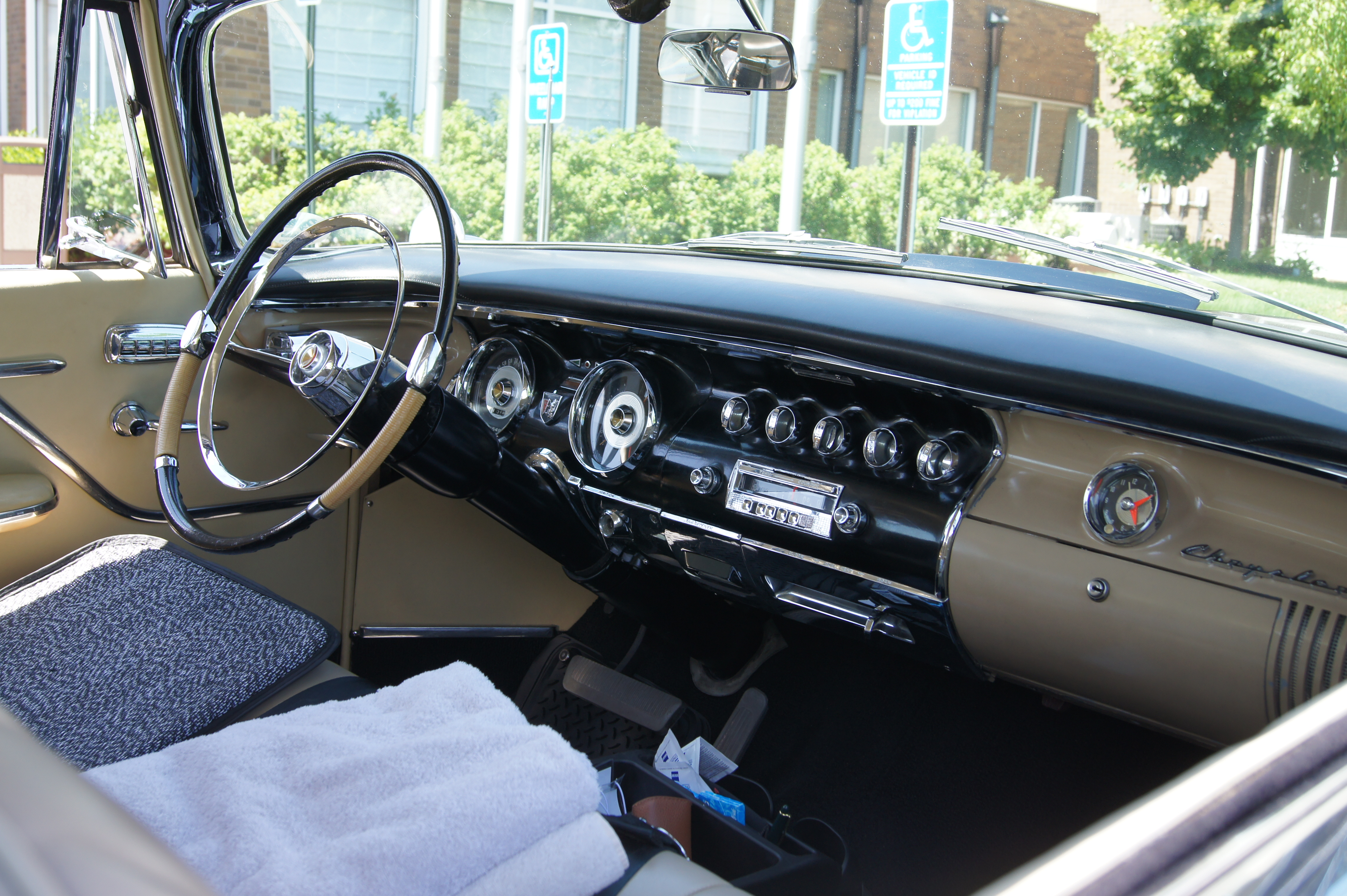
1956 Chrysler 300B interior

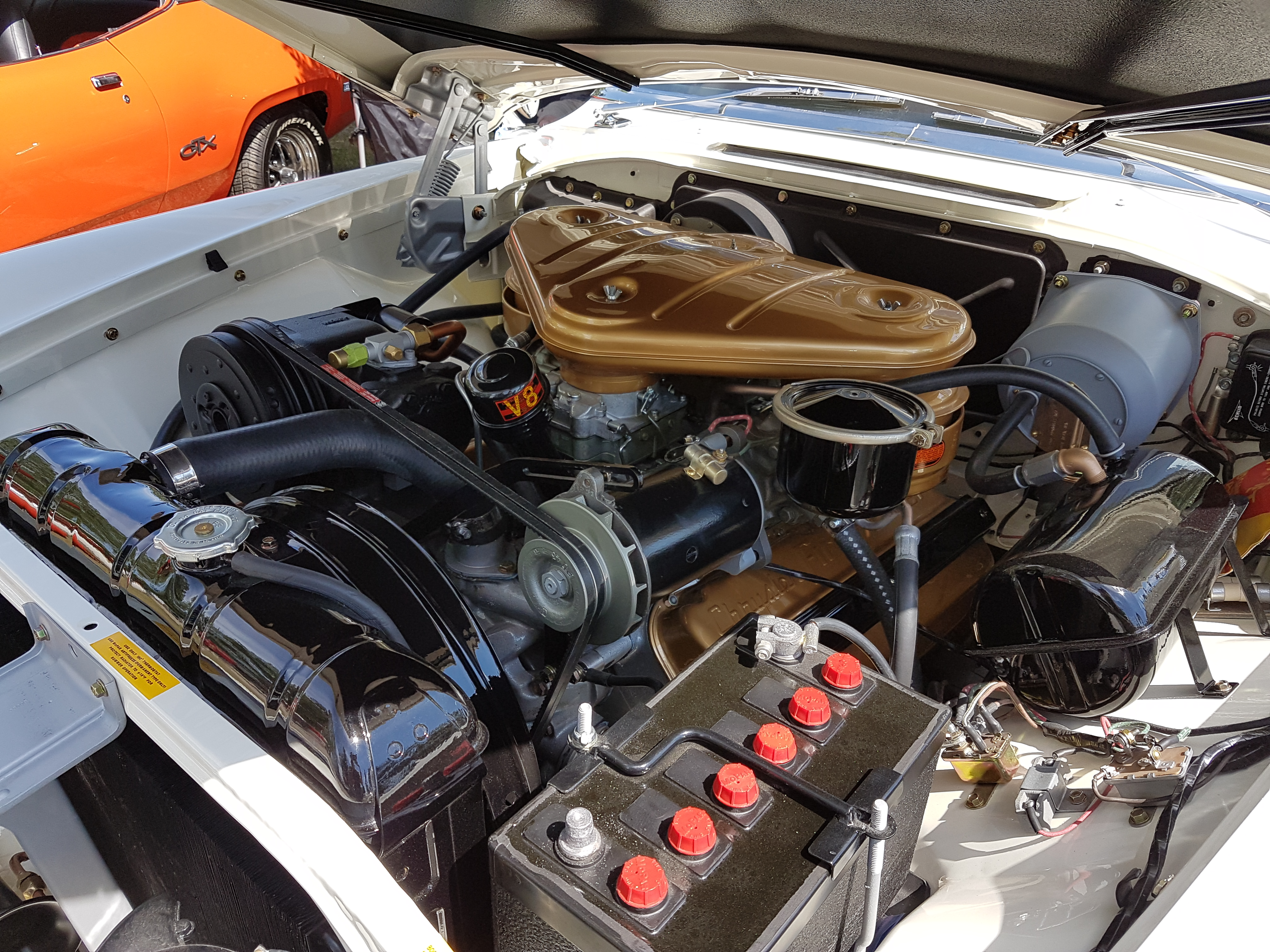
1956 Chrysler 300B engine

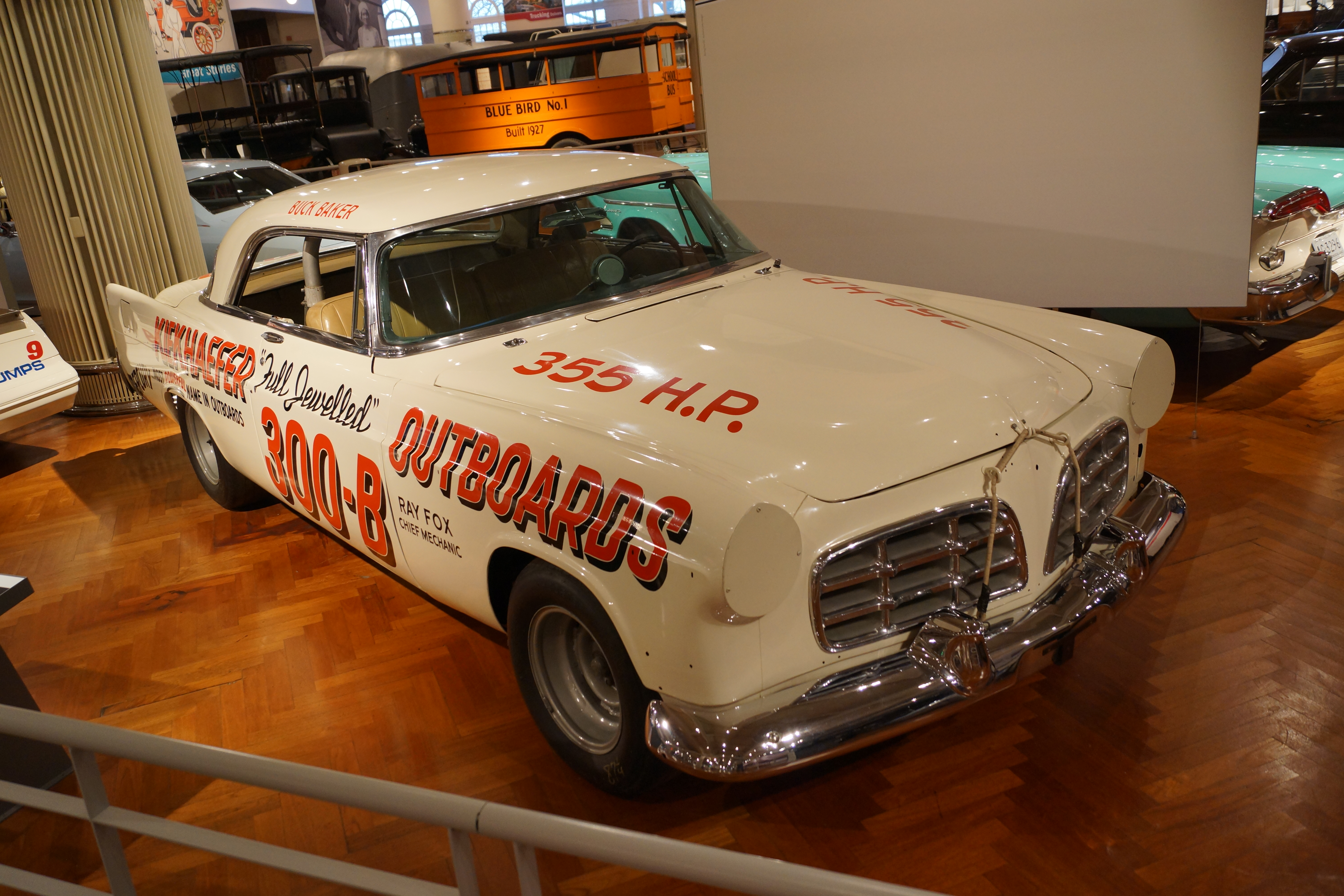
1956 Chrysler 300-B Kiekhaefer Race Team

== Second generation ==
=== 1957 300C ===
Chrysler 300C (C76-300)
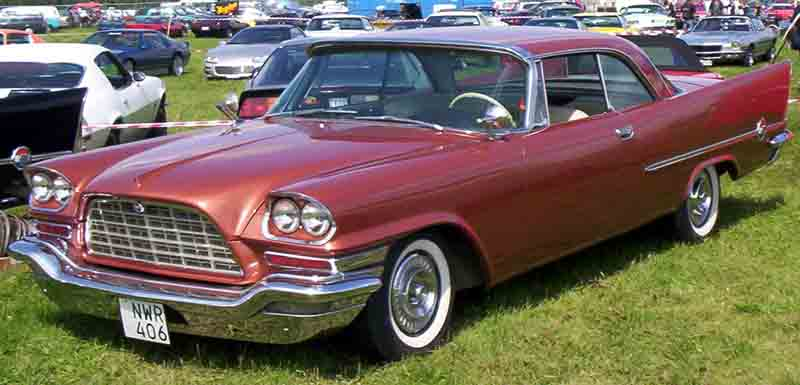

Overview
- Production: 1957; 2,402 produced
- Designer: Virgil Exner (chief engineer); Robert MacGregor Rodger

Body and chassis
- Body style: 2-door hardtop; 2-door convertible
- Chassis: body-on-frame
- Related: Chrysler New Yorker; Chrysler Saratoga; Imperial Crown; DeSoto Adventurer; Dodge D-501; Plymouth Fury

Powertrain
- Engine: 392 cu in (6.4 L) FirePower V8
- Transmission: 3-speed TorqueFlite A488 automatic 3-speed manual

Dimensions
- Wheelbase: 126.0 in (3,200 mm)
- Length: 219.2 in (5,568 mm)
- Width: 78.8 in (2,002 mm)
- Curb weight: 4,235 lb (1,921 kg) (coupe); 4,390 lb (1,991 kg) (convertible)

The 1957 model year 300C was corporately shared with an all new appearance for Chrysler products called the "Forward Look" and featuring a "yawning" wide trapezoid-shaped front grille which was unique to the 300C, "Vista-Dome" windshield, dual headlights, and gradually rising tailfins starting from the doors similar to Chrysler-branded products. It was first exhibited to the public on 8 December 1956 at the New York Automobile Show. The wheel diameter changed from 15 in (381 mm) to 14 in (356 mm) while continuing to use drum brakes for all wheels, and to keep the front brakes cool a cooling duct was installed with the air intake located just below the headlights that fed air directly to the front brakes. The exterior color list was expanded to offer Jet Black, Parade Green metallic, Copper Brown metallic, Gauguin Red and Cloud White while the interior was tan leather standard and optional interior choices were available from the New Yorker list of which the 300 was based.

The Hemi engine was upgraded to 392 cu in (6.4 L) with 375 hp (280 kW), or as a limited edition 390 hp (290 kW) version (18 built). The 392 CID engine was exclusive to the 300, New Yorker and Imperials, while the dual four barrel carburetors was standard on the 300C and continued with an improved air induction system that gave each carburetor its own air cleaner to improve efficiency. A convertible model was available for the first time and was listed at US$5,359 ($61,432 in 2025 dollars) while the two-door hardtop was listed at US$4,929 ($56,502 in 2025 dollars). In comparison, a 1957 Imperial Crown Convertible was listed at US$5,598 ($60,923 in 2025 dollars). GM's Pontiac Division introduced the Pontiac Bonneville as a convertible only, offering fuel injection and a similar price tag but offered lower luxury content and a reduced price for 1958, and Mercury offered the Mercury Turnpike Cruiser for 1957 with the optional 430 cu in (7.0 L) Super Marauder V8.

The car introduced red, white, and blue '300C' circular medallions on the sides, hood, trunk, and interior and was the first model to use the color scheme, and despite the late-1950s design trends that added ever increasing amounts of chrome, styling flourishes, intricate grilles and interior appearance features the styling of the 300C and subsequent generations remained minimal. A total of 1,918 coupes and 484 convertibles were built. All Chrysler products introduced the all-new torsion bar front suspension, called Torsion-Aire, which replaced the previous coil spring front suspension and the new Airtemp air-conditioner, a $495 option, was offered ($5,674 in 2025 dollars).

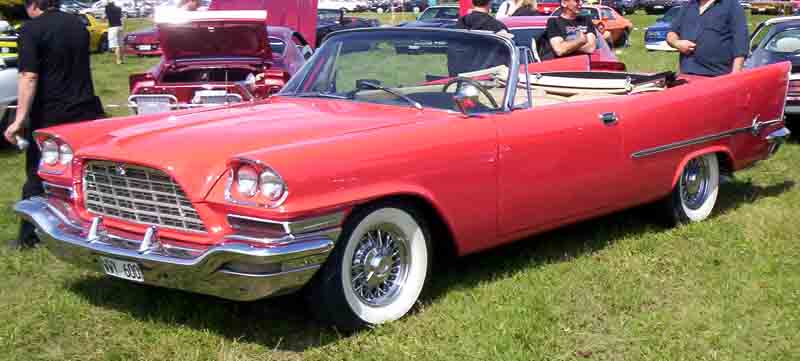
Chrysler 300C 1957

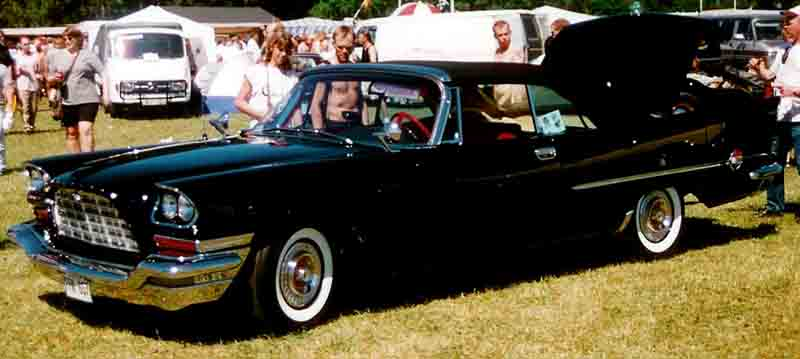
Chrysler 300C 1957

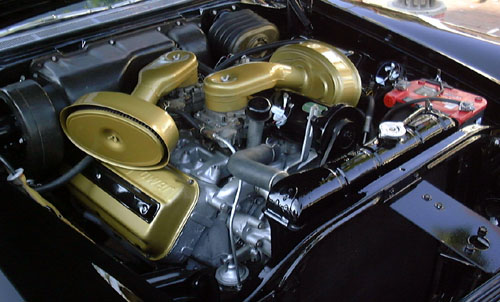
A Hemi engine in a Chrysler 300C

=== 1958 300D ===
Chrysler 300D (LC3-S)
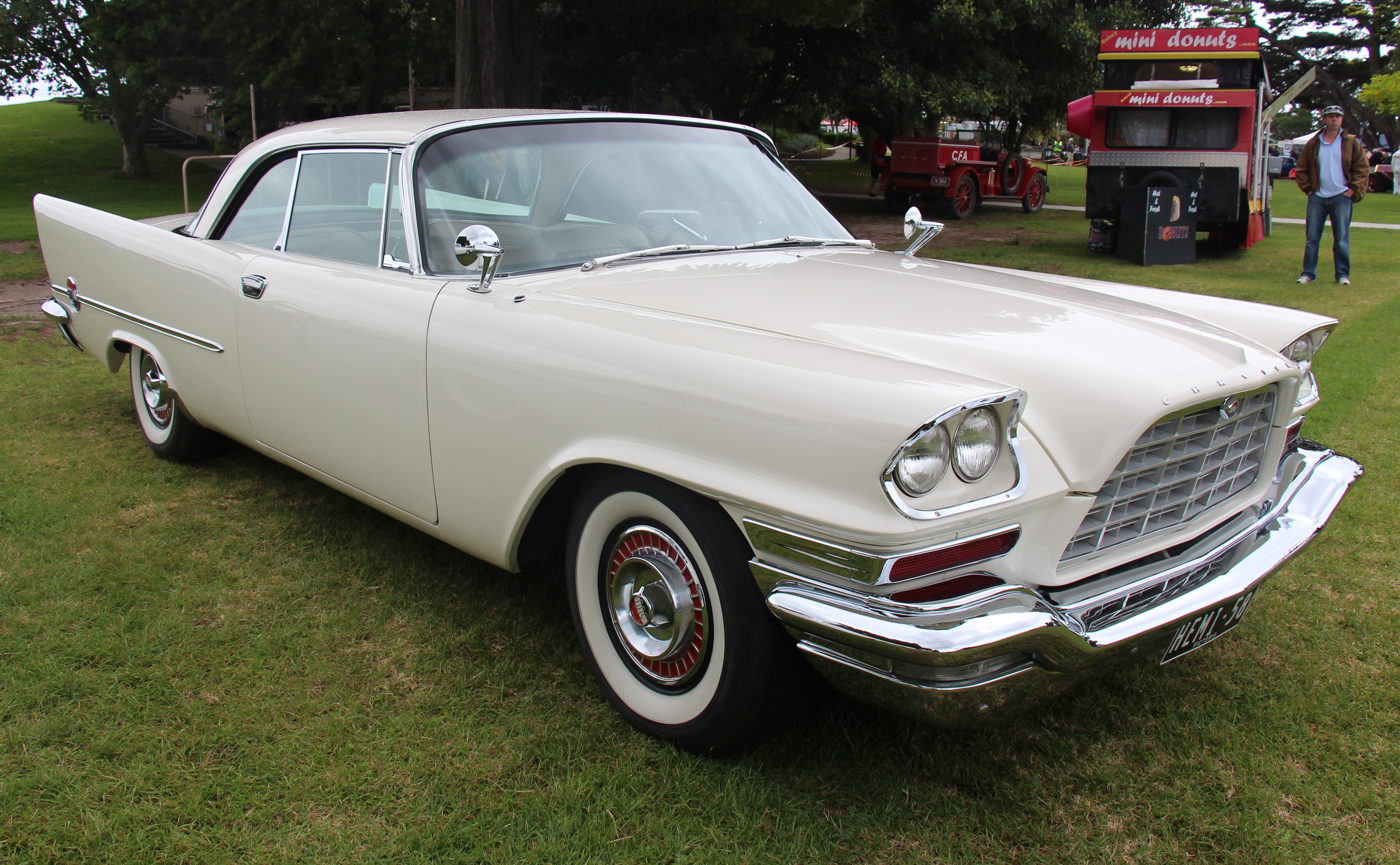
- 1958 Chrysler 300 D Sports Coupe 2-Door Hardtop

Overview
- Production: 1958; 809 produced
- Designer: Virgil Exner (chief engineer); Robert MacGregor Rodger

Body and chassis
- Body style: 2-door hardtop; 2-door convertible
- Chassis: body-on-frame
- Related: Chrysler New Yorker; Imperial Crown; DeSoto Adventurer; Dodge D-501; Plymouth Fury

Powertrain
- Engine: 392 cu in (6.4 L) FirePower V8
- Transmission: 3-speed TorqueFlite A488 automatic 3-speed manual

Dimensions
- Wheelbase: 126.0 in (3,200 mm)
- Length: 220 in (5,588 mm)
- Width: 78.8 in (2,002 mm)
- Curb weight: 4,305 lb (1,953 kg) (coupe); 4,475 lb (2,030 kg) (convertible)

The 1958 model year was to be the last use of the FirePower Hemi in the 300. The engine was still 392 cu in (6.4 L), but tuned to 380 hp (280 kW) as standard, while the 392 CID engine was exclusive to the 300 and Imperials. Thirty-five cars were built with an extremely rare option called the Bendix "Electrojector" fuel injection, with which the 392 cu in (6.4 L) V8 was rated at 390 bhp (291 kW). Due to reliability problems with the primitive onboard computer which controlled the injection system, however, vehicles installed with the fuel injection option were recalled and retrofitted with dual four barrel carburetors. Cars that were originally installed with the fuel injection had a special "300D" badge attached to the rear fender with additional "fuel injection" script included.

Due to the 300D continuing to be a sub-model of the New Yorker, luxury amenities were included. Standard items were leather upholstery, power assist steering, power assist brakes, power window lifts, dual remote adjustable side view mirrors, power adjustable driver seat, "Air-Temp" air-conditioning, power deploying radio antenna, tinted glass, rear window defroster, windshield washer, Limited-slip differential, Hi-Fi Phonograph, and "Auto-Pilot" cruise control. The exterior color list was updated to offer Raven Black, Aztec Turquoise, Mesa Tan, Tahitian Coral, Matador Red and Ermine White while the interior was tan leather standard and optional interior choices were available from the New Yorker list of which the 300 was based.

A 300D was driven to 156.387 mph (251.7 km/h) at the Bonneville Salt Flats that year, and another was driven at the Daytona Flying Mile, producing a quarter-mile time of 16 seconds at 94 mph (151.3 km/h). A total of 618 hardtops and 191 convertibles were produced, in part due to a recession, competition from the Ford Thunderbird and the listed retail price of US$5,173 ($57,726 in 2025 dollars) for the hardtop and US$5,603 ($62,525 in 2025 dollars) for the convertible. The 300D saw a new luxurious competitor from Mercury called the Park Lane.

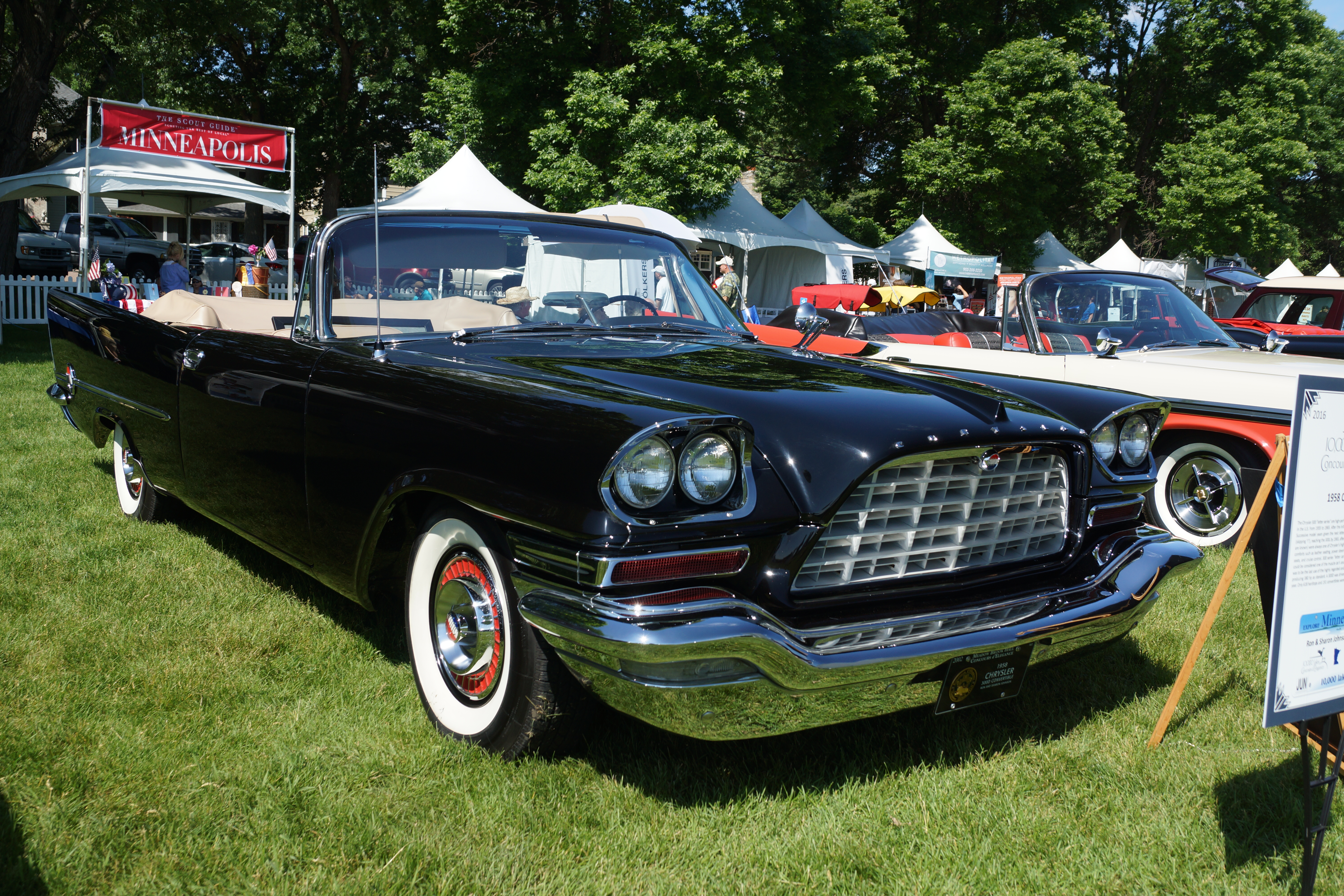
1958 Chrysler 300-D Convertible

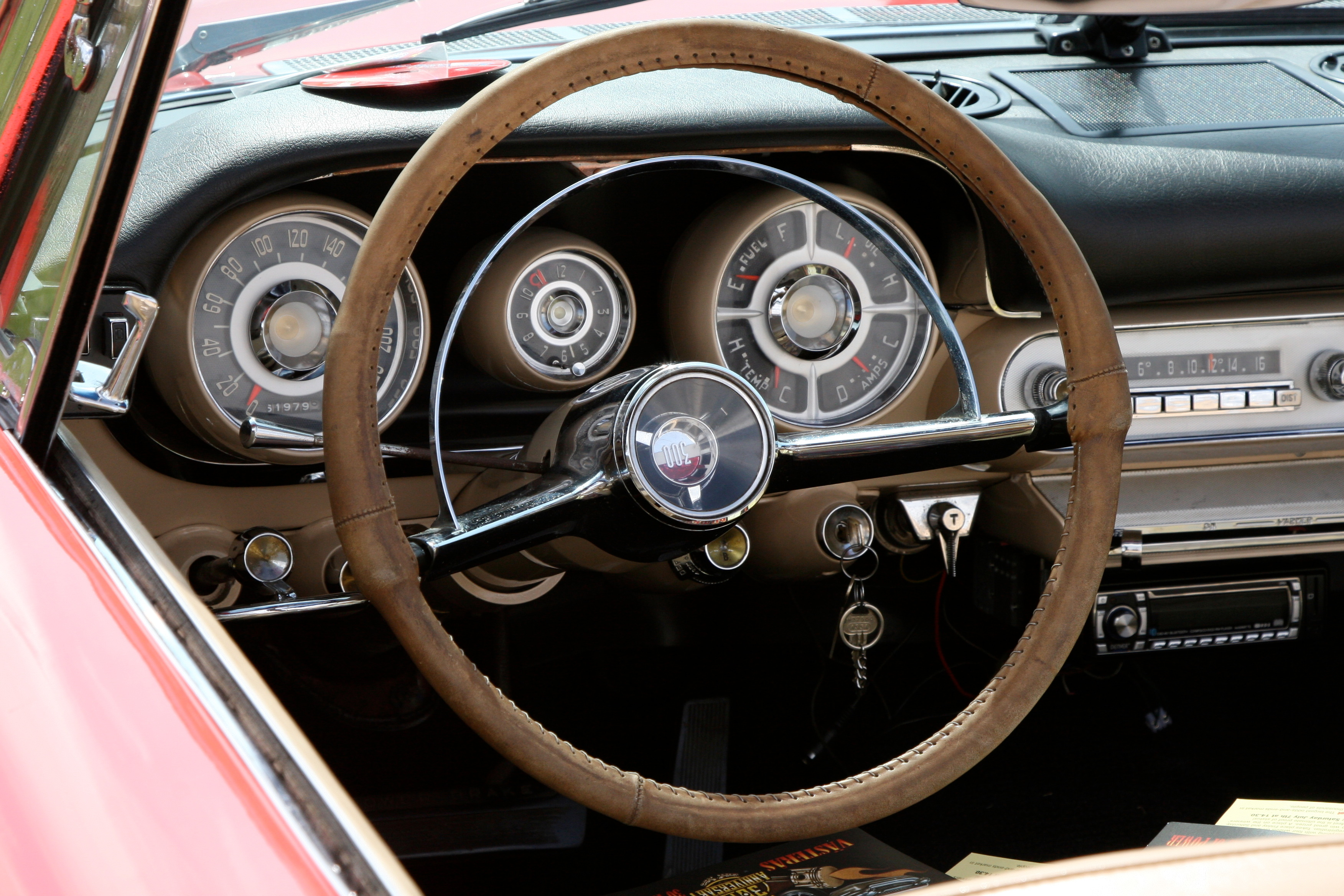
1958 Chrysler 300-D interior

=== 1959 300E ===
Chrysler 300E (MC3-H)
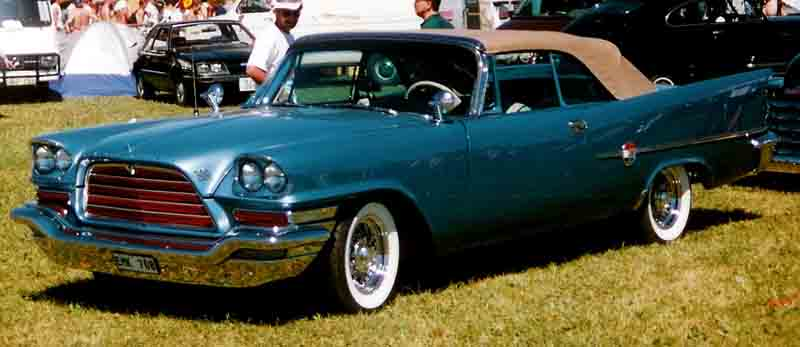

Overview
- Production: 1959; 647 produced
- Designer: Virgil Exner (chief engineer); Robert MacGregor Rodger

Body and chassis
- Body style: 2-door hardtop; 2-door convertible
- Chassis: body-on-frame
- Related: Chrysler New Yorker; Imperial Crown; DeSoto Adventurer; Dodge D-501; Plymouth Sport Fury

Powertrain
- Engine: 413 cu in (6.8 L) Golden Lion V8
- Transmission: 3-speed TorqueFlite A488 automatic 3-speed manual

Dimensions
- Wheelbase: 126 in (3,200 mm)
- Length: 220.9 in (5,611 mm)
- Curb weight: 4,290 lb (1,946 kg) (coupe); 4,350 lb (1,973 kg) (convertible)

The 1959 model year saw the Hemi engines replaced by Chrysler's new Golden Lion wedge-head V8 at 413 cu in (6.8 L) displacement (which Chrysler called "lion-hearted"), and remained exclusive to the 300 and Imperials. Power output remained about the same at 380 hp (280 kW) while the engine weight dropped by 103 lb (47 kg) and production costs were reduced. This model was the last year of body on frame chassis. Total sales included 522 coupes and 125 convertibles and the front grille and exterior styling retained the previous years appearance instead of adopting the corporate Chrysler appearance shared with Imperial for 1959. A small "300" badge was installed on the left side of the grille perpendicular to the headlights, while the grille was updated to narrow horizontal red bars highlighted by four chrome bars in place of the previous eggcrate grille and only appeared for 1959. New for 1959 was the installation of Goodyear Blue Streak bias-ply tires on 14 in wheels which are now classified as Vintage Racing tires.

Attention to detail was evident in the standard features included. The instrument cluster continued the tradition of easy-to- read gauges with two large circular gauges with an engine turned, sometimes also called perlée appearance. The left cluster contained the odometer and a speedometer that went to 150 mph (241.4 km/h), while the right side contained an ammeter, fuel gauge, oil pressure indicator, and water temperature gauges. A clock with a sweeping second hand is installed between the two directly centered to the steering column. Power adjustable swivel seats were standard but were synchronized to the opening of the door while accommodating a traditional six-way power adjustable split front bench seat, with a new "Natural Tan" leather upholstery feature called "Living Leather" that used a basket-weave pattern to promote air circulation in warm weather, while optional interior choices were available from the New Yorker list of which the 300 was based. The exterior color list was updated to offer Formal Black, Turquoise Grey metallic, Cameo Tan metallic, Copper Spice metallic, Radiant Red and Ivory White. The listed retail price continued to climb to US$5,319 ($58,746 in 2025 dollars) for the hardtop and US$5,749 ($63,495 in 2025 dollars) for the convertible.

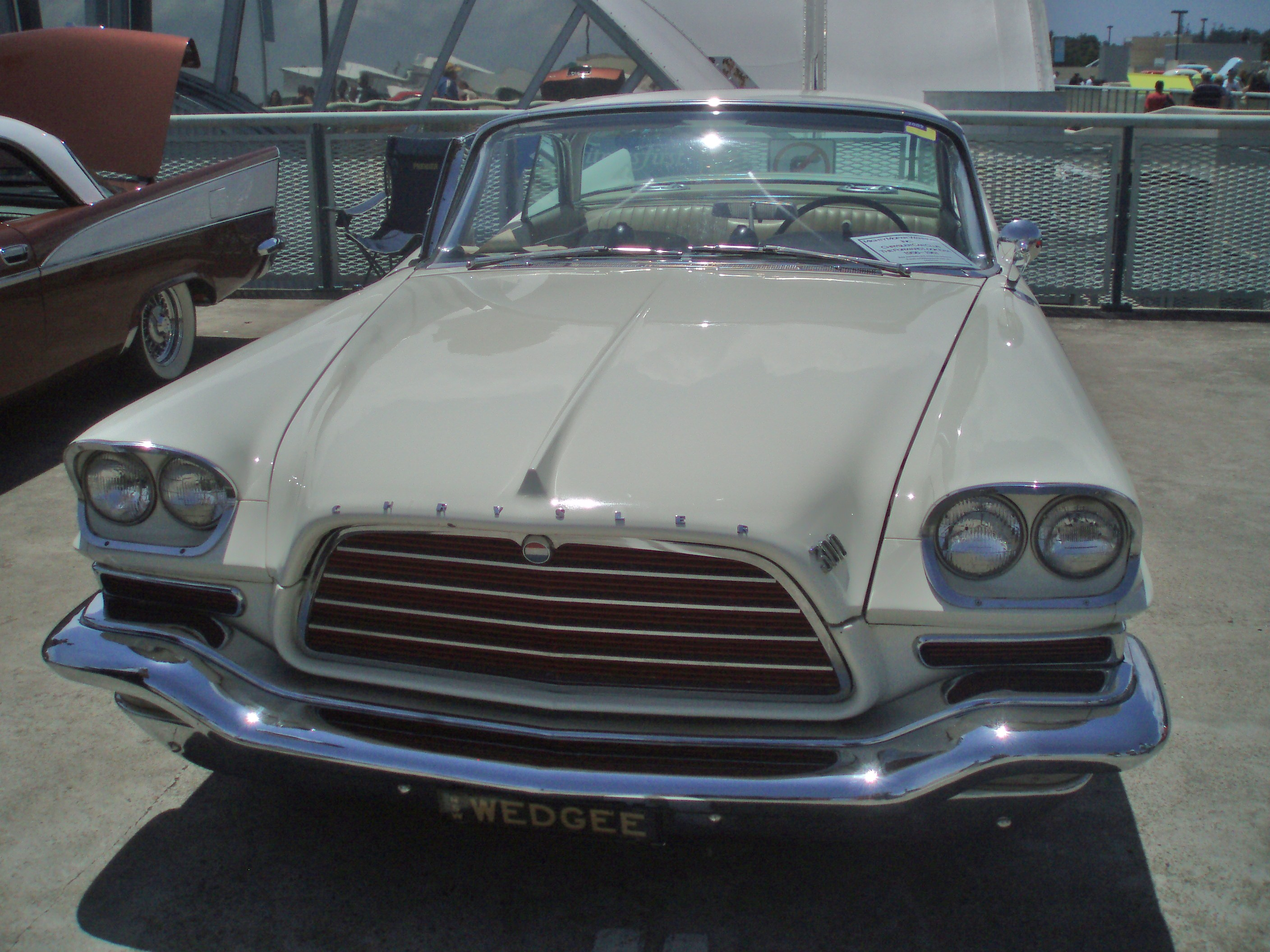
1959 Chrysler squared steering wheel 300E

== Third generation ==
=== 1960 300F ===
Chrysler 300F (PC3-300)
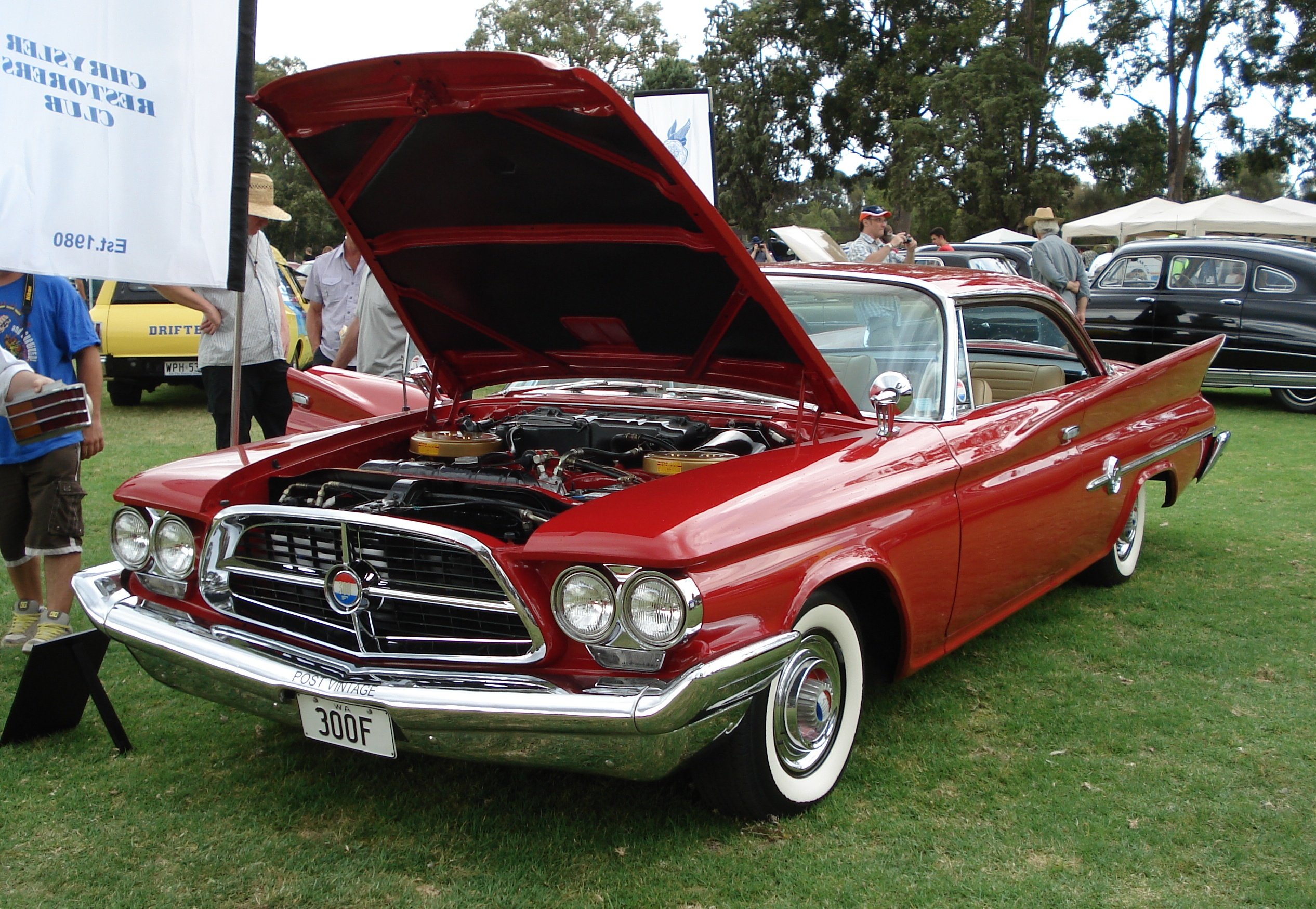

Overview
- Production: 1960; 1,217 produced
- Designer: Virgil Exner (chief engineer); Robert MacGregor Rodger

Body and chassis
- Body style: 2-door hardtop; 2-door convertible
- Chassis: unibody
- Related: Chrysler New Yorker; Imperial Crown; DeSoto Adventurer; Dodge Polara; Plymouth Fury

Powertrain
- Engine: 413 cu in (6.8 L) Golden Lion V8
- Transmission: 3-speed TorqueFlite A488 automatic; 4-speed Pont-à-Mousson manual (racing/special order)

Dimensions
- Wheelbase: 126 in (3,200 mm)
- Length: 219.6 in (5,578 mm)
- Width: 79.4 in (2,017 mm)
- Curb weight: 4,270 lb (1,937 kg) (coupe); 4,310 lb (1,955 kg) (convertible)

The 1960 model offered a 375 hp (280 kW) "Cross-Ram" version of the 413 cu in (6.8 L) Wedge Head V8 introduced in 1959. To boost power at lower and mid rpms, a special intake manifold was derived. Instead of the normal V8 central intake manifold with carburetor(s) on top, the cross-ram consisted of two pairs of 30 in (760 mm) long tuned pipes that criss-crossed so that each set fed the opposite side of the engine. The carburetors and air cleaners hung off the sides of the engine over the fender wells. These long tubes were tuned so that resonances in the column of air helped force air into the cylinders at those engine speeds.

A special 400 hp (300 kW) "short ram" version optimized for higher engine speeds was produced for competition. The overall tube length remained at 30", but the tuned portion of the stacks was only 15 in (380 mm), favoring high RPMs. Only 15 "short ram" cars were produced; these were also fitted with the exotic but often troublesome French manufactured Pont-a-Mousson 4-speed manual transmissions developed for the Chrysler-powered Facel Vega. Approximately 4 of these "Special Gran Turismo" are known to exist, including one convertible and one with air conditioning; it is believed that 15 were originally produced.

Also new were four individual, leather bucket seats for front and rear passengers with a full-length console from dash to rear seatback which had previously been introduced on the Chrysler Norseman concept car of 1956. The rear passenger electric window switches were installed in the center console within easy reach, and bench seats for front and rear passengers were no longer available. The rear bucket seats were also offered on the New Yorker Custom coupe. Swiveling front seats were fitted as standard equipment but were modified to mechanical operation only initiated by the driver and not synchronized to the door when opened. The AstraDome instrument cluster was introduced on all Chrysler products only and featured "Panelescent Lighting" and a tachometer was installed in the center console below the radio due to the complexity of the three dimensional instrument cluster. The exterior color list was shortened to Formal Black, Toreador Red metallic, Alaskan White, and Terra Cotta metallic while the standard interior color remained as tan leather.

The dash had been designed with Chrysler's push-button controls for the TorqueFlite automatic in mind, with the "AstraDome" instrument cluster covering the part of the steering column a column shifter would come out from under then-standard practice, so manual cars used a floor shifter. Due to the installation of the "AstraDome" instrument cluster extending outward towards the steering wheel, the traditional installation of the turn signal lever was relocated to the dashboard underneath the "TorqueFlite" pushbutton gear selectors and was installed as a sliding lever that would return to center as the steering wheel returned to the center position. To the right of the steering wheel but left of the radio were pushbutton controls for the ventilation and air conditioning while retaining the use of a lever for temperature control.

The bodywork was also redone for 1960, using Chrysler's new lightweight unibody construction and given sharper-edged styling with outward-tilting fins that were visually separated from sides, while the front grille adopted the corporate look used by all Chrysler-branded products, ending a tradition where the 300 had unique styling not shared with other Chrysler branded vehicles. A controversial "Continental"-style trunk lid appeared, shared with the Imperial and was gone for 1961.

Sales increased to 969 coupes and 248 convertibles with a suggested retail price of US$5,411 ($58,888 in 2025 dollars) for the hardtop coupe and US$5,841 ($63,568 in 2025 dollars) for the convertible.

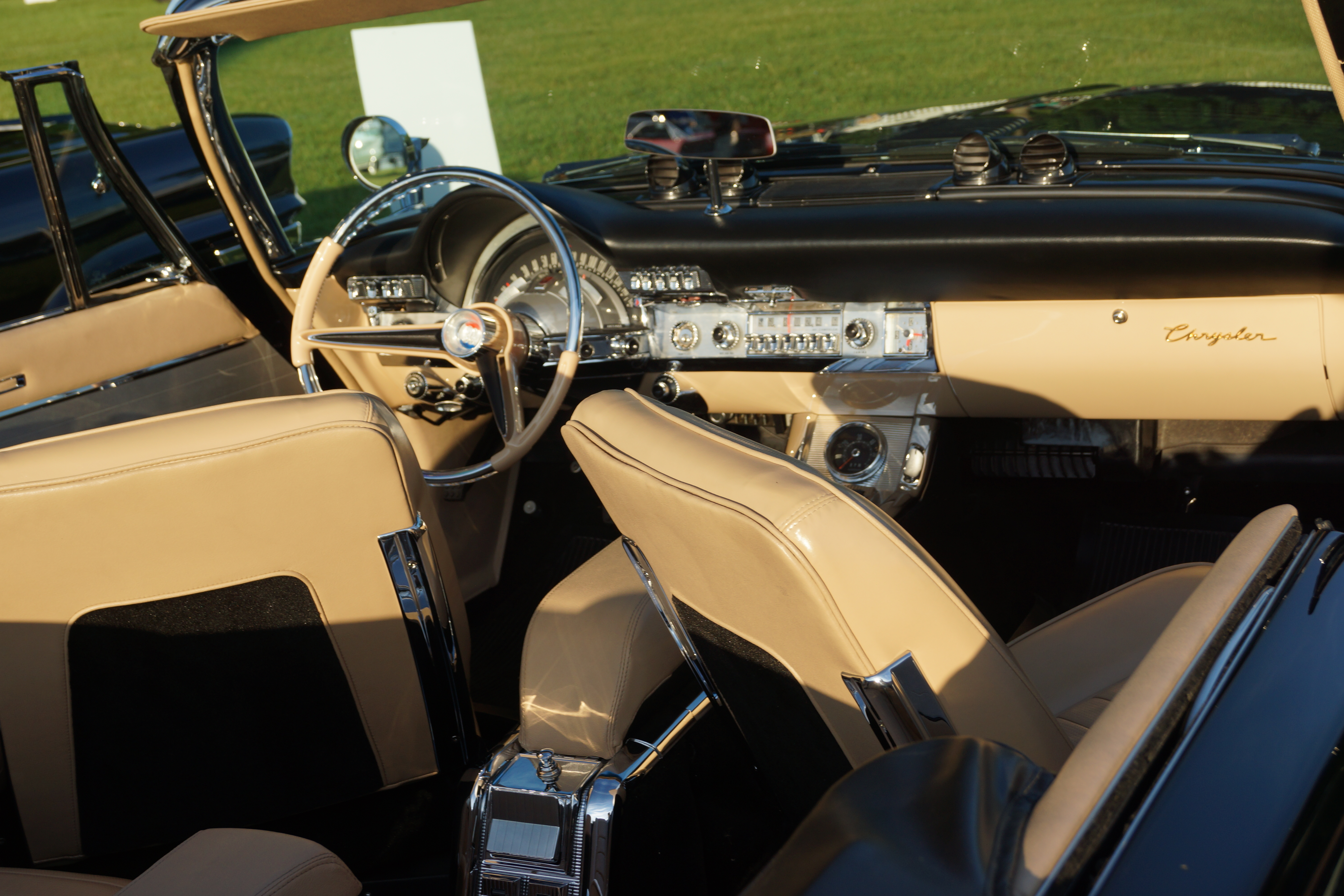
Chrysler 300F Convertible showing AstraDome instrument cluster

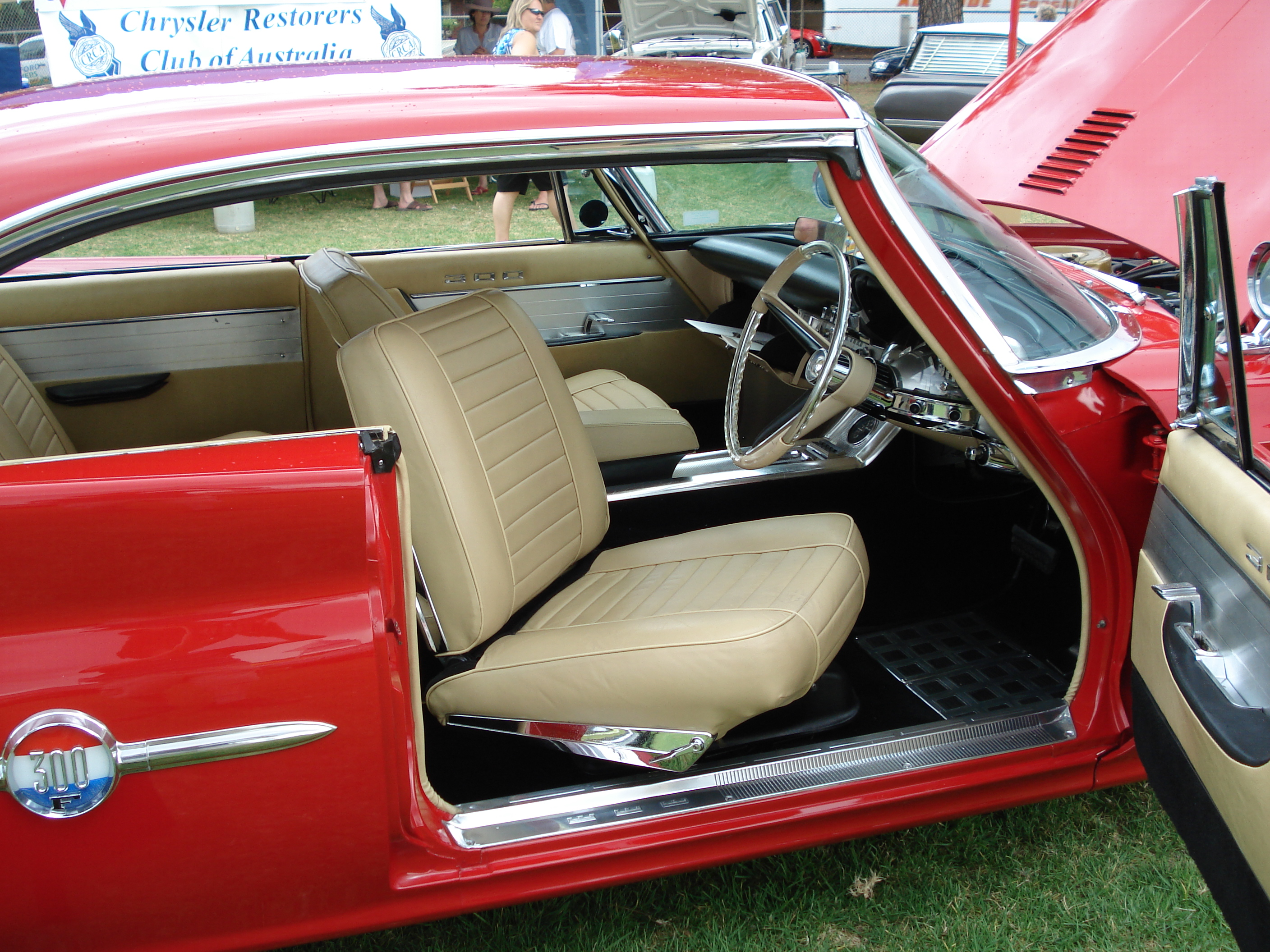
The 300F featured swiveling front seats as standard equipment (RHD Chrysler Australia built)

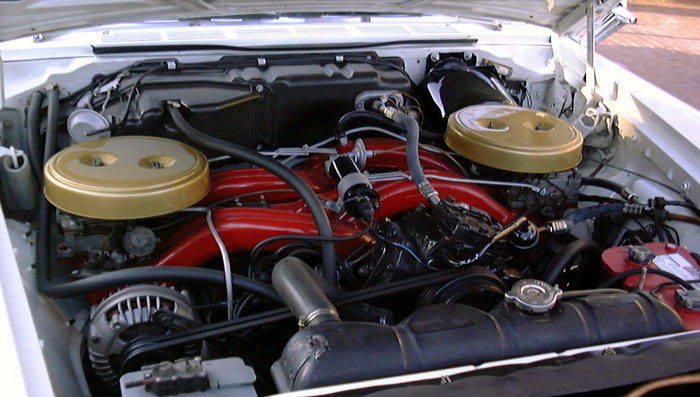
Chrysler 300F cross-ram

=== 1961 300G ===
Chrysler 300G (RC4-P)
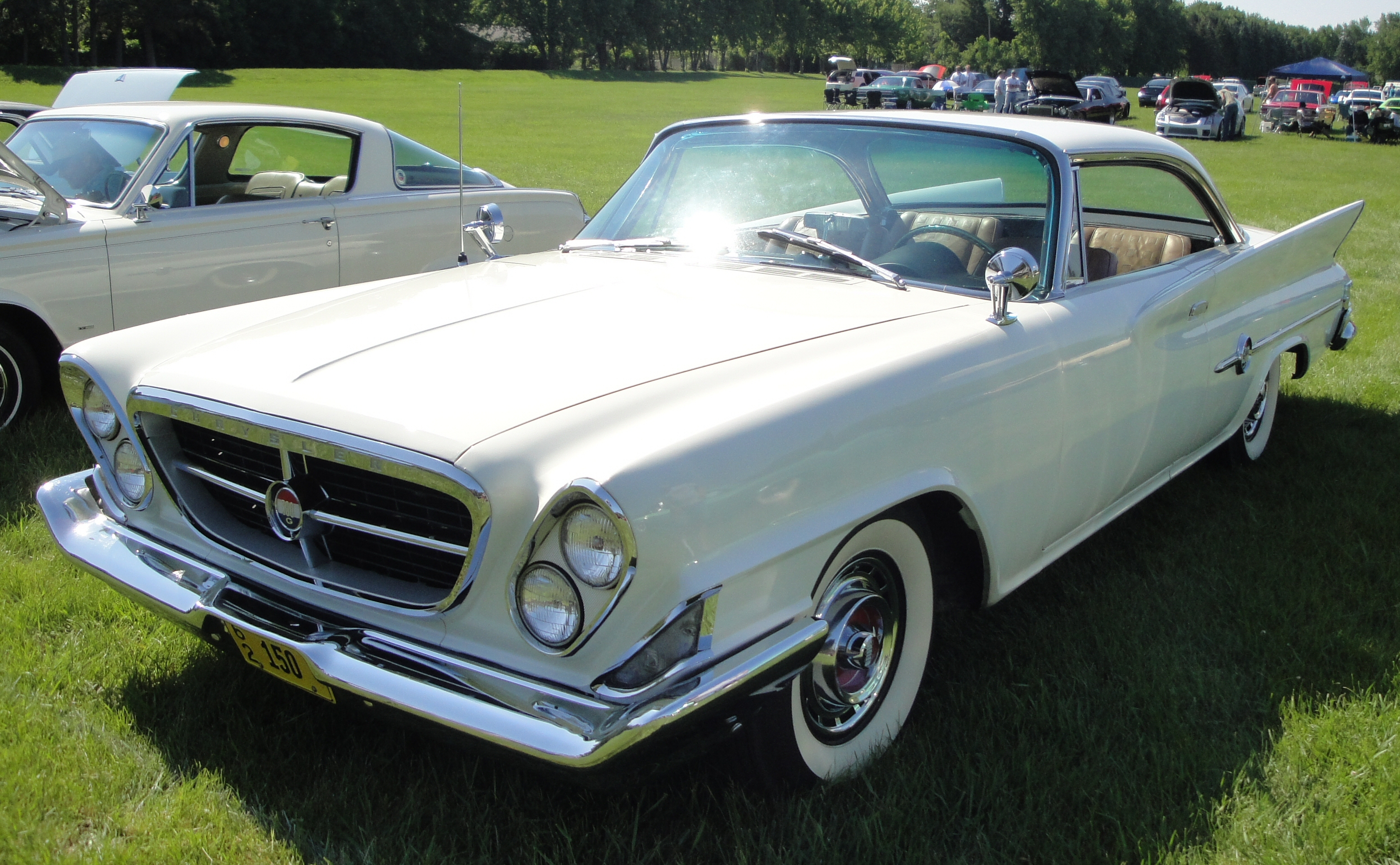

Overview
- Production: 1961; 1,617 produced
- Designer: Virgil Exner (chief engineer); Robert MacGregor Rodger

Body and chassis
- Body style: 2-door coupe; 2-door convertible
- Chassis: unibody
- Related: Chrysler New Yorker; Imperial Crown; DeSoto (1961)

Powertrain
- Engine: 413 cu in (6.8 L) Golden Lion V8
- Transmission: 3-speed manual "Code 281" manual (race/special order); 3-speed TorqueFlite A488 automatic

Dimensions
- Wheelbase: 126 in (3,200 mm)
- Length: 219.8 in (5,583 mm)
- Width: 79.4 in (2,017 mm)
- Curb weight: 4,260 lb (1,932 kg) (coupe); 4,315 lb (1,957 kg) (convertible)

The 1961 model saw another restyle. The grille, formerly wider at the bottom than the top, was inverted; the quad headlights, formerly side-by-side, were canted inward at the bottom, in a manner reminiscent of 1958-1960 Lincolns and 1959 Buicks. Small parking lamps below the headlights were likewise slanted and V-shaped, and the front bumper was canted up at each end, scoop-like. At the rear, the taillights were moved from the fins to the tail below them, and the fins were made sharper-pointed. Power windows were standard. The standard equipment rear bucket seats continued with a full-length console from the dashboard along the tunnel containing the driveshaft, and were also offered on the New Yorker Custom coupe.

Mechanically, the cross-ram "short ram" and "long ram" engines remained the same with the dual four barrel carburetors, although the exotic French manual transmission was dropped, and replaced by an exclusive Chrysler-sourced heavy-duty manual transmission (referred to as 'option code 281'). A 300G would post the highest speed of 143 mph (230.1 km/h) in the Daytona Flying Mile, and in 1961 speed trials were moved off the beach at Daytona.

The "AstraDome" instrument cluster which was sometimes called the "gumball" or "jukebox" due to its appearance continued to be installed on all Chrysler products for 1961. The exterior color list was updated to Formal Black, Mardi Gras Red, Alaskan White, and Cinnamon metallic while the standard interior color continued as tan leather. To aide in brake cooling, the hubcaps and pressed steel wheels were introduced with slots to allow airflow across the drum brakes. Suggested retail prices continued to climb at US$5,441 ($58,621 in 2025 dollars) for the coupe and US$5,841 ($62,931 in 2025 dollars) for the convertible.

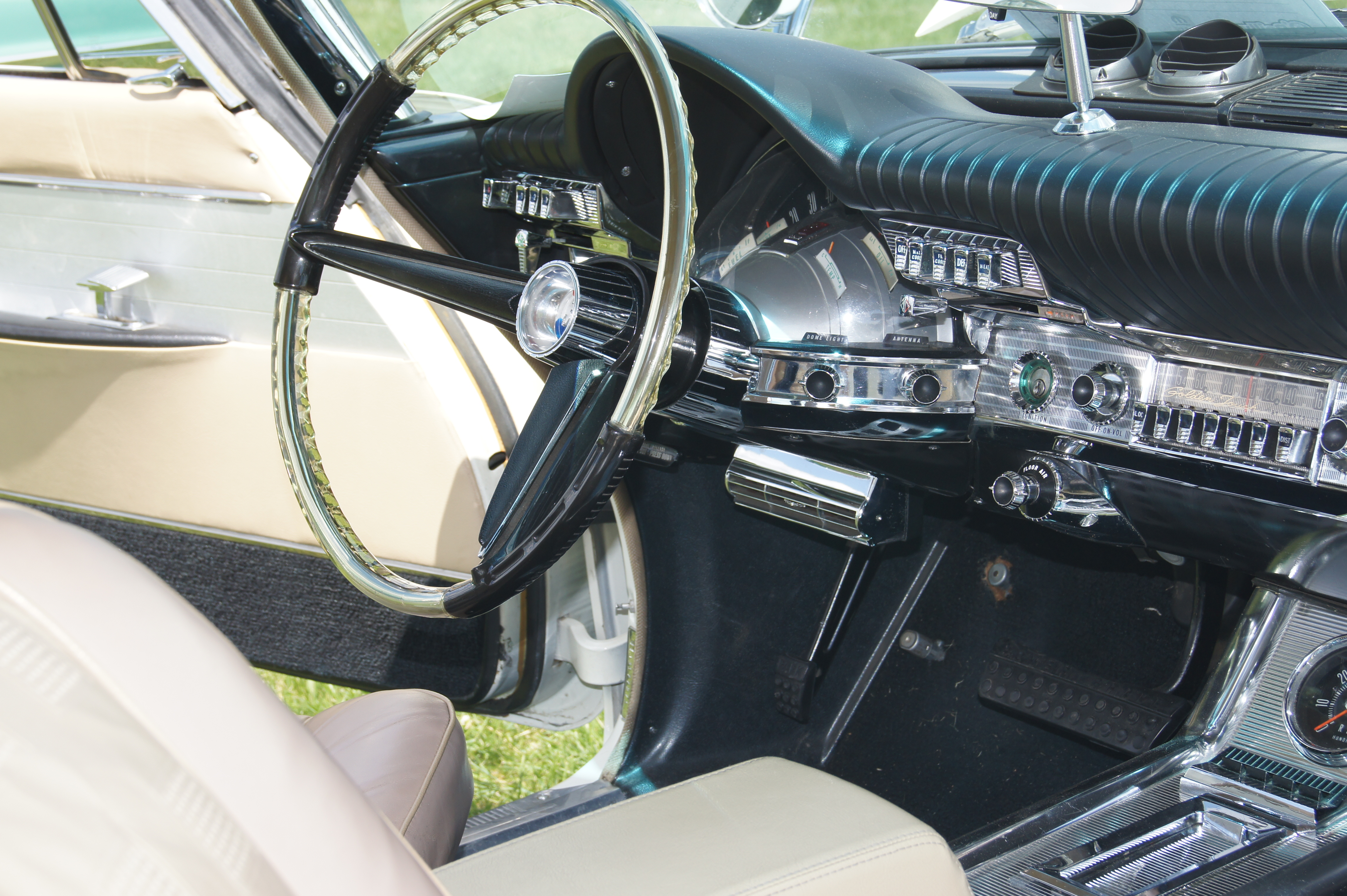
1961 Chrysler 300G AstraDome instrument gauge cluster

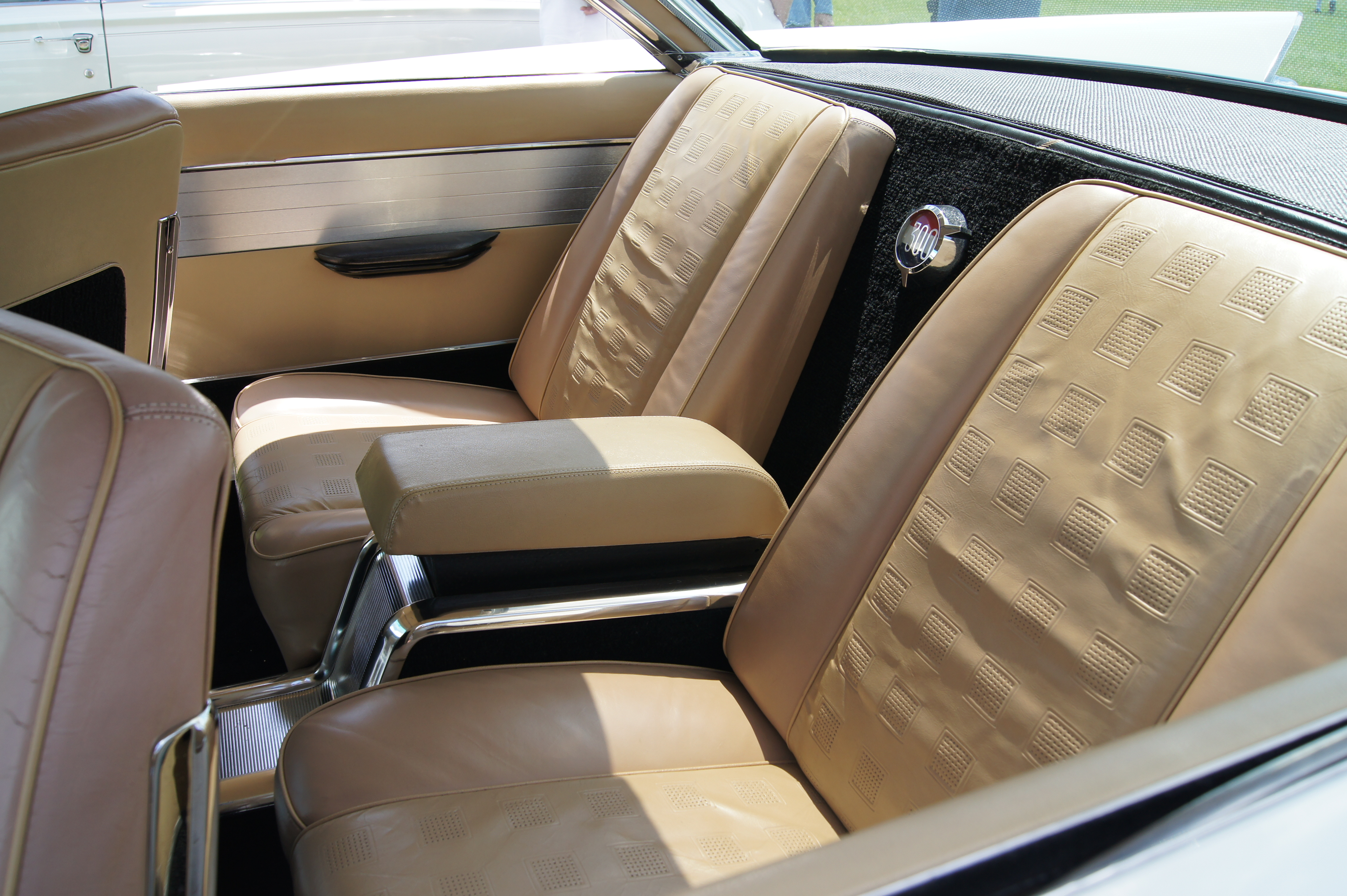
1961 Chrysler 300G rear bucket seats with armrest

=== 1962 300H ===
Chrysler 300H (SC2-M)
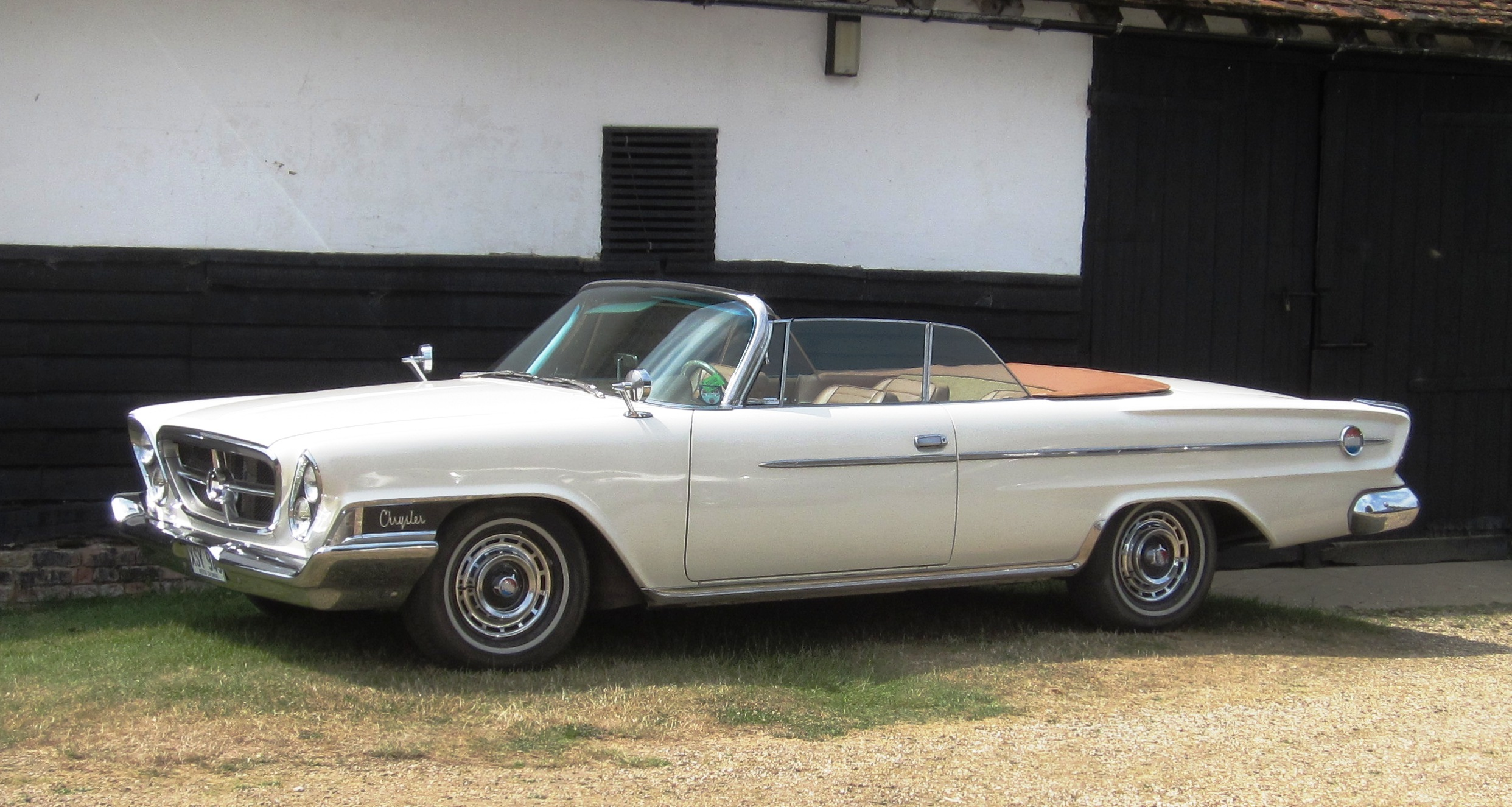

Overview
- Production: 1962; 570 produced
- Designer: Virgil Exner (chief engineer); Robert MacGregor Rodger

Body and chassis
- Body style: 2-door coupe; 2-door convertible
- Chassis: unibody
- Related: Chrysler New Yorker; Chrysler Newport; Imperial Crown; Chrysler 300 Sport Series engine and transmission only 1962-1964 Facel Vega Facel II; 1958-1964 Facel Vega Excellence; 1962-1966 Jensen C-V8

Powertrain
- Engine: 413 cu in (6.8 L) Golden Lion V8
- Transmission: 3-speed automatic TorqueFlite A488; 3-speed manual

Dimensions
- Wheelbase: 122 in (3,099 mm)
- Length: 214.9 in (5,458 mm)
- Width: 79.4 in (2,017 mm)
- Curb weight: 4,050 lb (1,837 kg) (coupe); 4,105 lb (1,862 kg) (convertible)

From 1962s models, the fins were gone from all Chrysler products, as was the letter series' unique place in the Chrysler lineup; there was now the new Chrysler 300 Sport Series which came as a two-door hardtop, replacing the cancelled Chrysler Windsor, while the convertible remained with the letter series along with a two-door hardtop 300H. Externally there was little difference between the 300H and the 300 Sport Series except for a "300H" badge on the traditional location on the rear fenders, and many of the 300H's standard features could be ordered as options on the Sport Series. The Mercury competitor was the all-new Mercury S-55 with the same approach to luxury and performance in a coupe or convertible and the Buick Wildcat.

Inside, the 300 Sport Series hardtop coupe was installed with standard bench seats front and rear, similar to the Newport, while the 300H had standard bucket seats front and rear with the full length center console, and were also offered on the New Yorker Custom coupe. This was also the last year for the AstraDome Instrument cluster for all Chrysler branded vehicles and the dashboard color now matched the leather upholstery and carpet. The exterior color list was updated to Formal Black, Festival Red, Oyster White, and Caramel while the standard interior color continued as tan leather.

Under the hood of the 300H the cross ram engine became an option, and there was a return to the inline dual 4-barrel carburetor setup of the 300E as the base powerplant. With a slight power boost and a 300 lb (140 kg) lighter body, due to the 300H being shared with the Chrysler Newport/Dodge Custom 880 122-inch wheelbase which reduced overall weight, the 300H was faster than the 300G, but the loss of exclusivity coupled with high prices made this the slowest-selling letter series year yet, with only 435 coupes and 135 convertibles sold. The 300 Sport Series hardtop sedan used a 383 cu in (6.3 L) B engine. Suggested retail prices showed a reduction from the past at US$5,090 ($54,176 in 2025 dollars) for the coupe and US$5,461 ($58,125 in 2025 dollars) for the convertible.

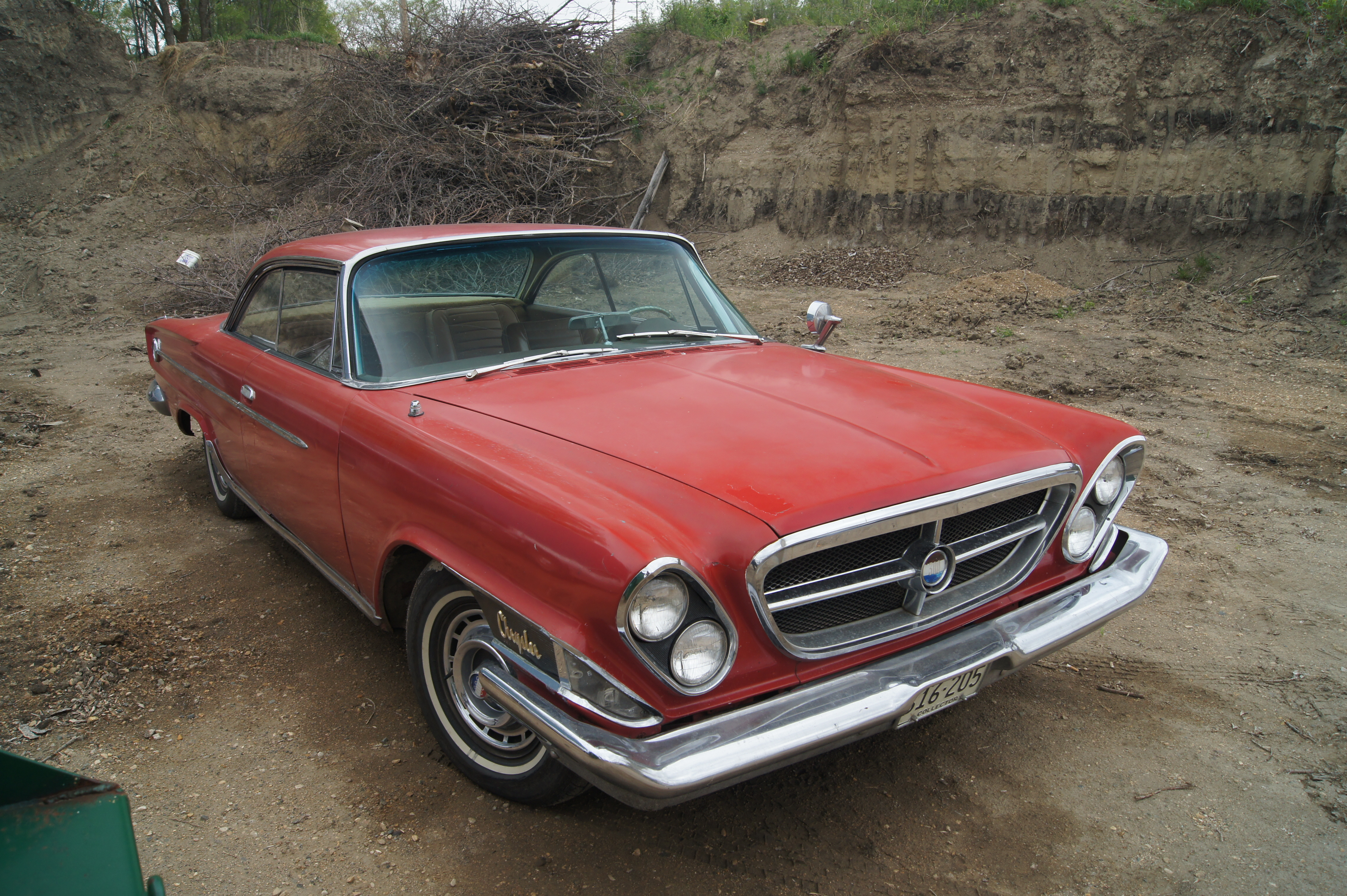
1962 Chrysler 300H hardtop

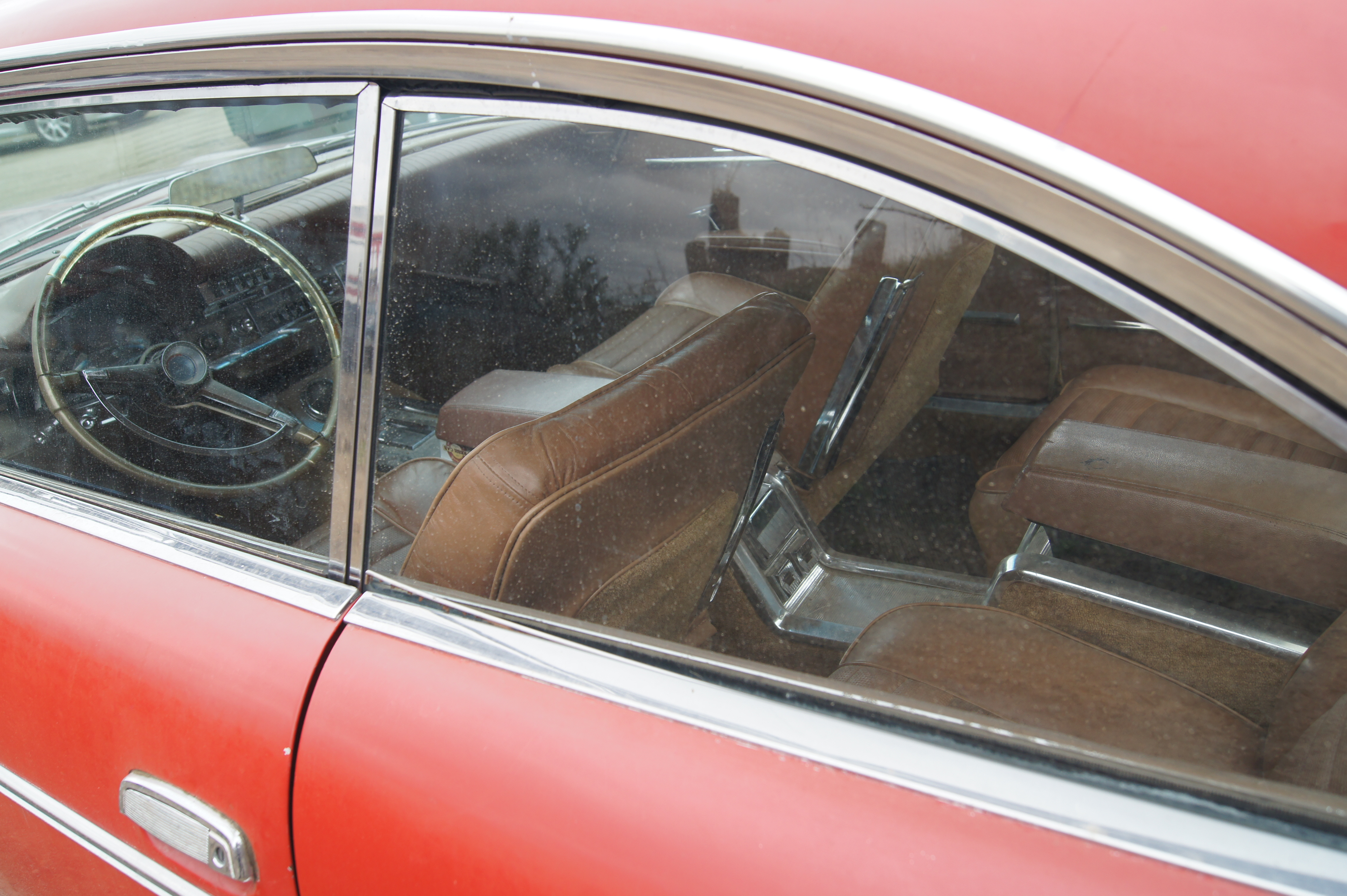
1962 Chrysler 300H interior

== Fourth generation ==
=== 1963 300J ===
Chrysler 300J (TC2-M)
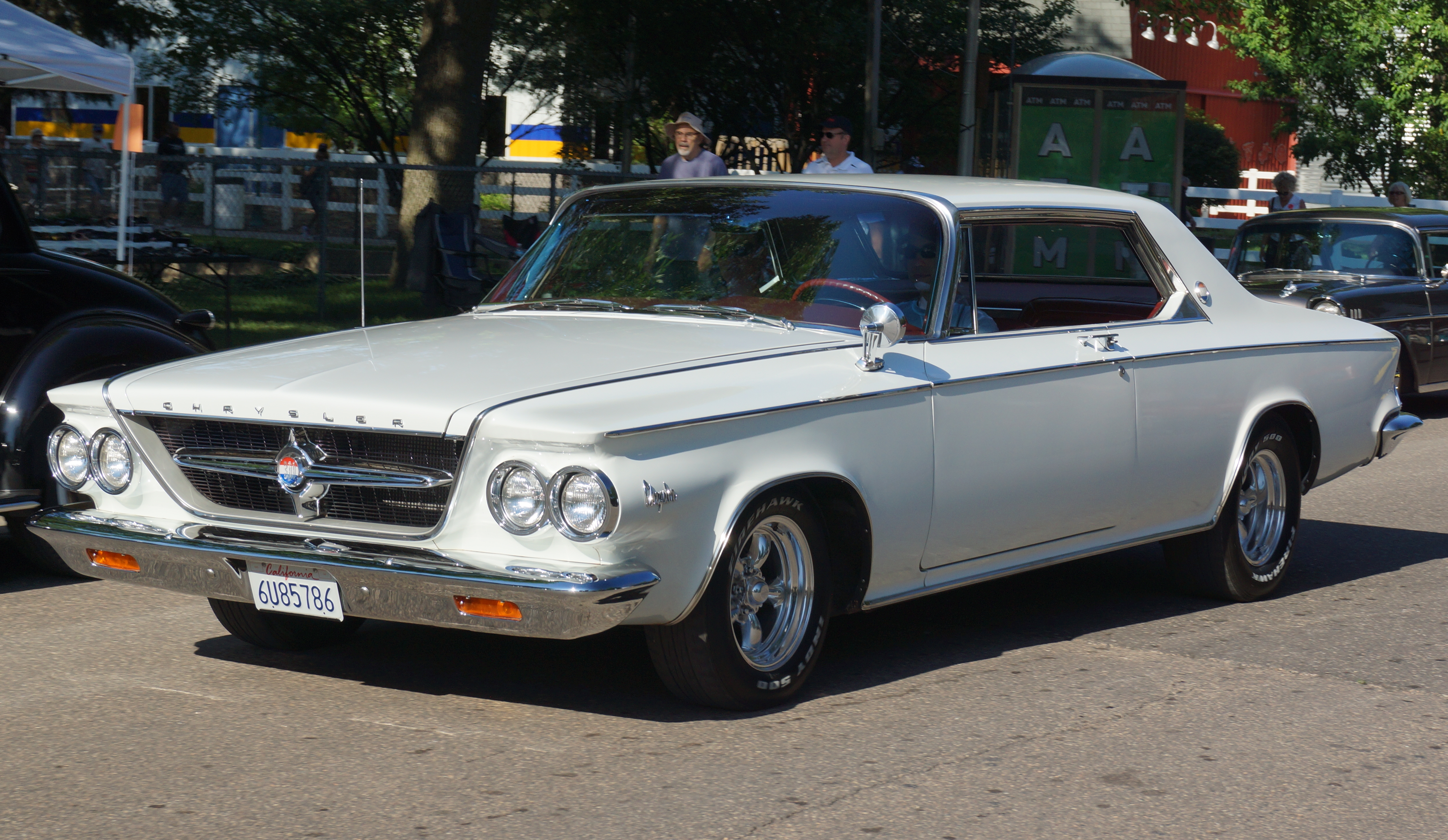

Overview
- Production: 1963; 400 produced
- Designer: Virgil Exner (chief engineer); Robert MacGregor Rodger

Body and chassis
- Body style: 2-door coupe
- Platform: Chrysler C platform
- Chassis: unibody
- Related: Chrysler New Yorker; Imperial Crown; Chrysler 300 Sport Series

Powertrain
- Engine: 413 cu in (6.8 L) Golden Lion V8
- Transmission: 3-speed TorqueFlite automatic 4-speed manual

Dimensions
- Wheelbase: 122 in (3,099 mm)
- Length: 215.5 in (5,474 mm)
- Width: 79 in (2,007 mm)
- Curb weight: 4,000 lb (1,814 kg)

A more formal, angular, so-called "crisp, new custom look" appeared for 1963, ushering in the Chrysler C platform architecture. To avoid confusion with the number one, the letter "I" was skipped over and the first iteration became the "300J". Shared with the 300 Sport Series, Newport and New Yorker series, this body design featured wide C-pillars, minimized bright trim and was the last one styled during Virgil Exner's term as Chrysler's styling chief. Medallions featuring CHRYSLER THREE HUNDRED lettering surrounding a large J were mounted on the C-pillars and the rear deck. The standard leather-upholstered interior did away with the swivel feature for the front bucket seats while the previous full-length center console was now limited to the front with the rear compartment reverting to a bench seat. To address quality and reliability concerns, Chrysler in 1963 introduced a five-year/50,000-mile warranty, a business practice that was unheard of by its competitors in the 1960s

The only available engine was the 413 cu in (6.8 L) ram-induction V8, with an increase of 10 hp (7.5 kW) from 1962; this temporarily re-established the practice of the top-spec engine being standard on the letter series. The redesigned, otherwise low-key interior featured an oddly squared steering wheel, shared with all Chrysler products for that year. The 300J was faster than the standard 300H of the year before, with a 142 mph (229 km/h) top speed, 8.0 seconds 0-60 mph, and a standing quarter mile time of 15.8 seconds with a terminal velocity of 89 mph (143 km/h). Sales were especially poor, with only 400 cars produced, while the retail price was listed at US$5,184 ($54,517 in 2025 dollars). The exterior color list was updated to Formal Black, Claret Red, Oyster White, Alabaster, and Madison Grey metallic while the standard (and only) interior was Claret Red leather.

The 300 convertible was now demoted to the Sport Series, and was the official pace car for the 1963 Indianapolis 500-Mile Race, and the car could be provided with exterior markings on commercially sold cars, where it was marketed as the 300 Pacesetter, an approach previously used on the 1956 DeSoto Fireflite Pacesetter. Power steering was standard and an addition was made to the TorqueFlite control panel where a "Park" lever was added alongside the control buttons so that when the transmission was placed in neutral the park lever was moved to the bottom to engage the function.

=== 1964 300K ===
Chrysler 300K (VC2-M300)
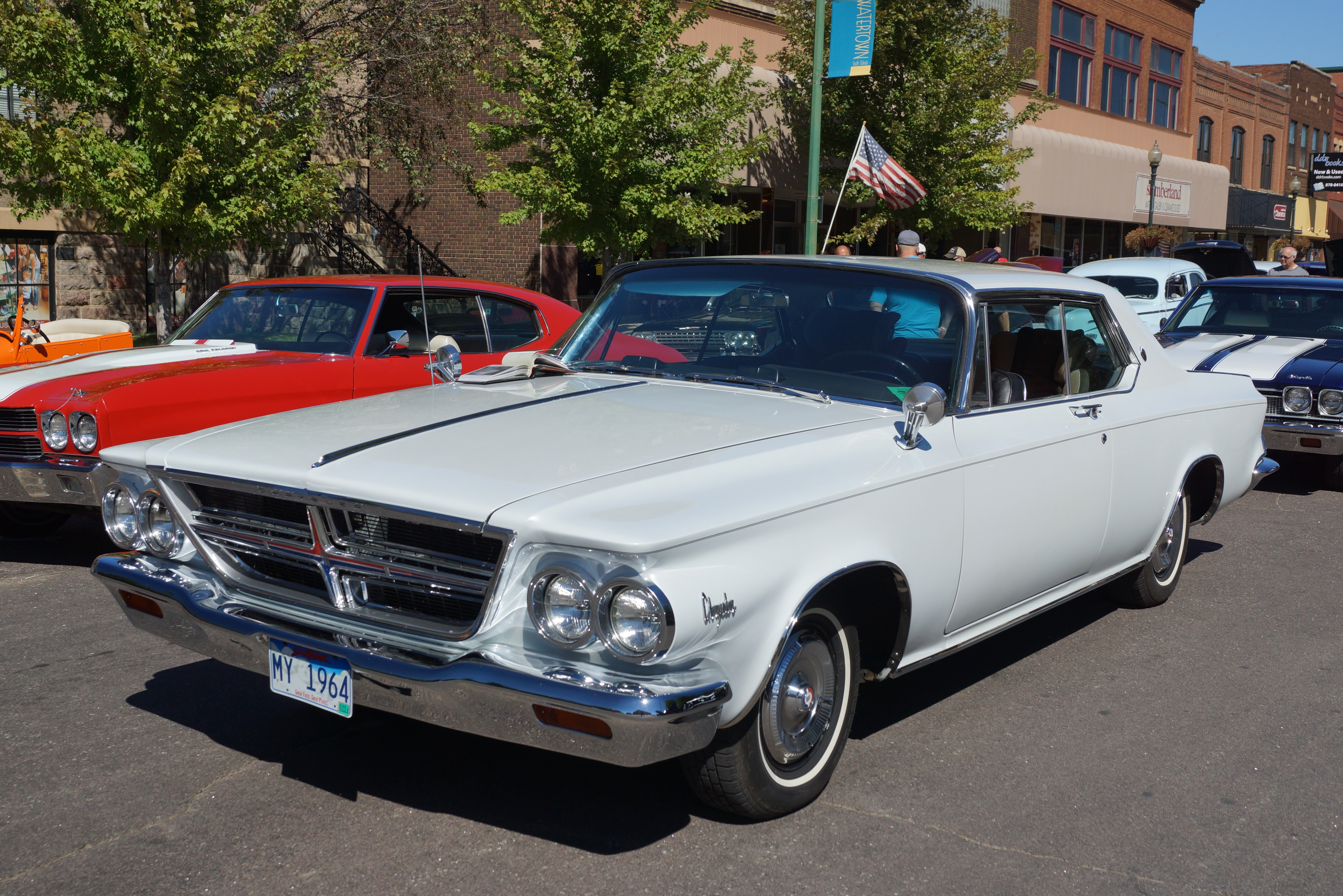

Overview
- Production: 1964; 3,647 produced
- Designer: Virgil Exner (chief engineer); Robert MacGregor Rodger

Body and chassis
- Body style: 2-door hardtop; 2-door convertible
- Platform: Chrysler C platform
- Chassis: unibody
- Related: Chrysler New Yorker; Imperial Crown; Chrysler 300 Sport Series

Powertrain
- Engine: 413 cu in (6.8 L) Golden Lion V8
- Transmission: 3-speed TorqueFlite automatic; 4-speed manual

Dimensions
- Wheelbase: 122 in (3,099 mm)
- Length: 215.5 in (5,474 mm)
- Width: 80 in (2,032 mm)
- Curb weight: 3,965 lb (1,798 kg) (coupe); 3,990 lb (1,810 kg) (convertible)

The convertible returned for the 1964 300K, but the "cross-ram" engine became an extra-cost option available on the 300K only. A 413 cu in (6.8 L) Wedge with a single Carter AFB 3614S 4-barrel carburetor, a regular intake manifold, and 360 hp (270 kW) was the new standard engine, shared with the Imperial. Leather upholstery was no longer standard, a US$94 option ($976 in 2025 dollars), while the list of available exterior colors expanded extensively with contrasting interior color choices in vinyl. The colors available were Formal Black, Wedgewood Blue, Nassau Blue metallic, Monarch Blue metallic, Pine Mist metallic, Sequoia Green metallic, Silver Turquoise metallic, Royal Turquoise metallic, Madison Grey, Rosewood metallic, Royal Ruby metallic, Roman Red, Embassy Gold, Persian White, Dune Beige, Sable Tan metallic, and Silver Mist metallic A mid-year special trim package was the 300K Silver Edition. It was offered only as a 2-door hardtop in Silver Mist metallic paint, a vinyl half-roof that gave a targa top appearance and bucket front seats with a reclining passenger seat. The bucket seats in all cars were redesigned with the result being a thicker, more substantial look.

Previous generations starting in 1955 earned the 300 the reputation of being "the banker's hotrod", but the marketing focus changed due to the 300 Sport Series, and this reduced the baseline price of the 300K by over a thousand dollars, and sales responded with the largest total ever; 3,022 coupes and 625 convertibles, with the coupe available at US$4,228 ($43,890 in 2025 dollars) and the convertible at US$4,694 ($48,728 in 2025 dollars). A center console was standard and distinguished it from the 300 Sport Series coupe. Later in 1964, the Plymouth Barracuda was introduced on the Chrysler A platform which was sold at Chrysler-Plymouth dealerships next to the Chrysler 300K. A visual distinction can be made between the years by the rear tail lights; the 300J has round units while the 300K has trapezoid shaped units. The TorqueFlite pushbutton controls that were installed to the left of the steering wheel were removed and instead a console mounted transmission selector was introduced, while a manual transmission was also available.

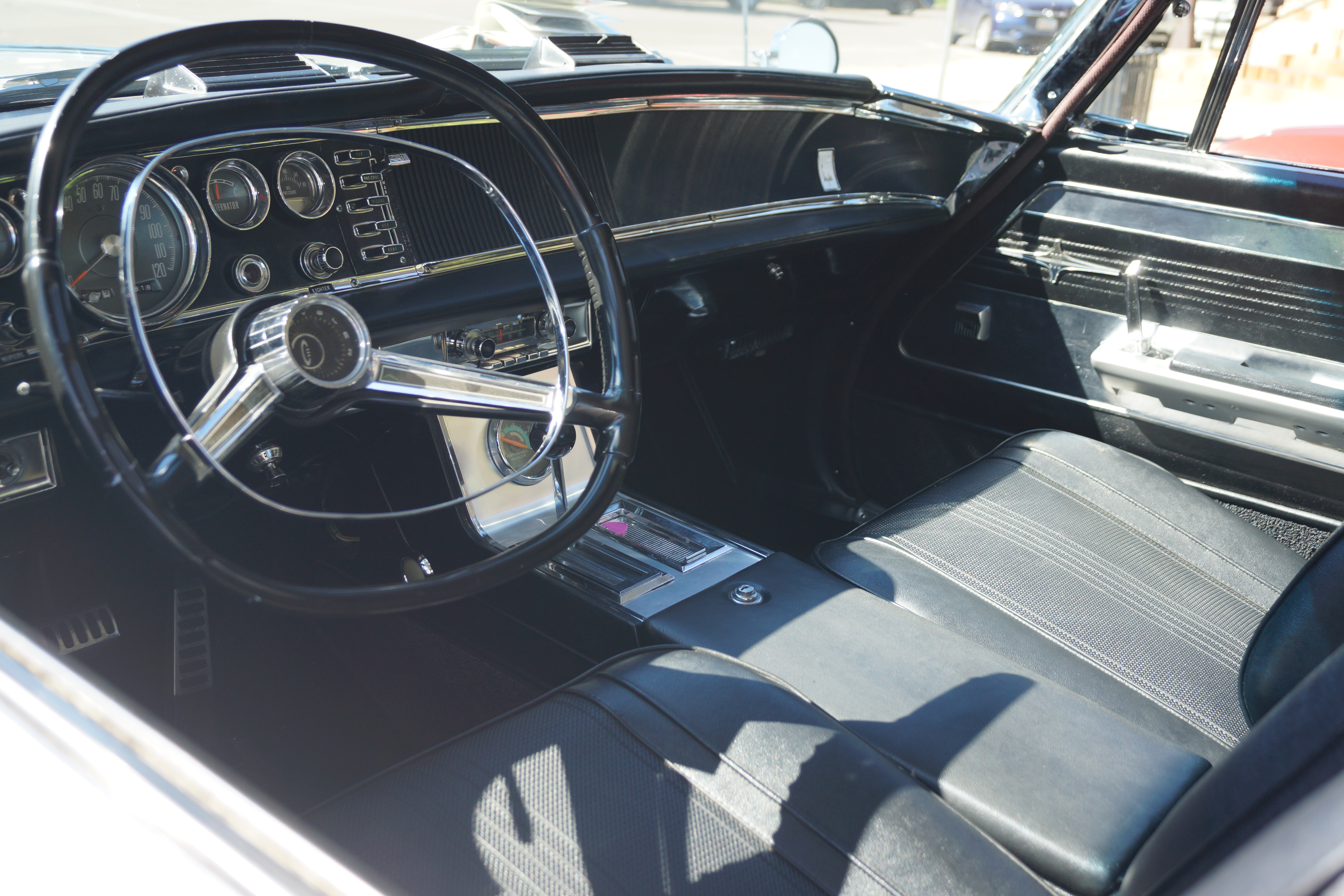
1964 Chrysler 300K interior

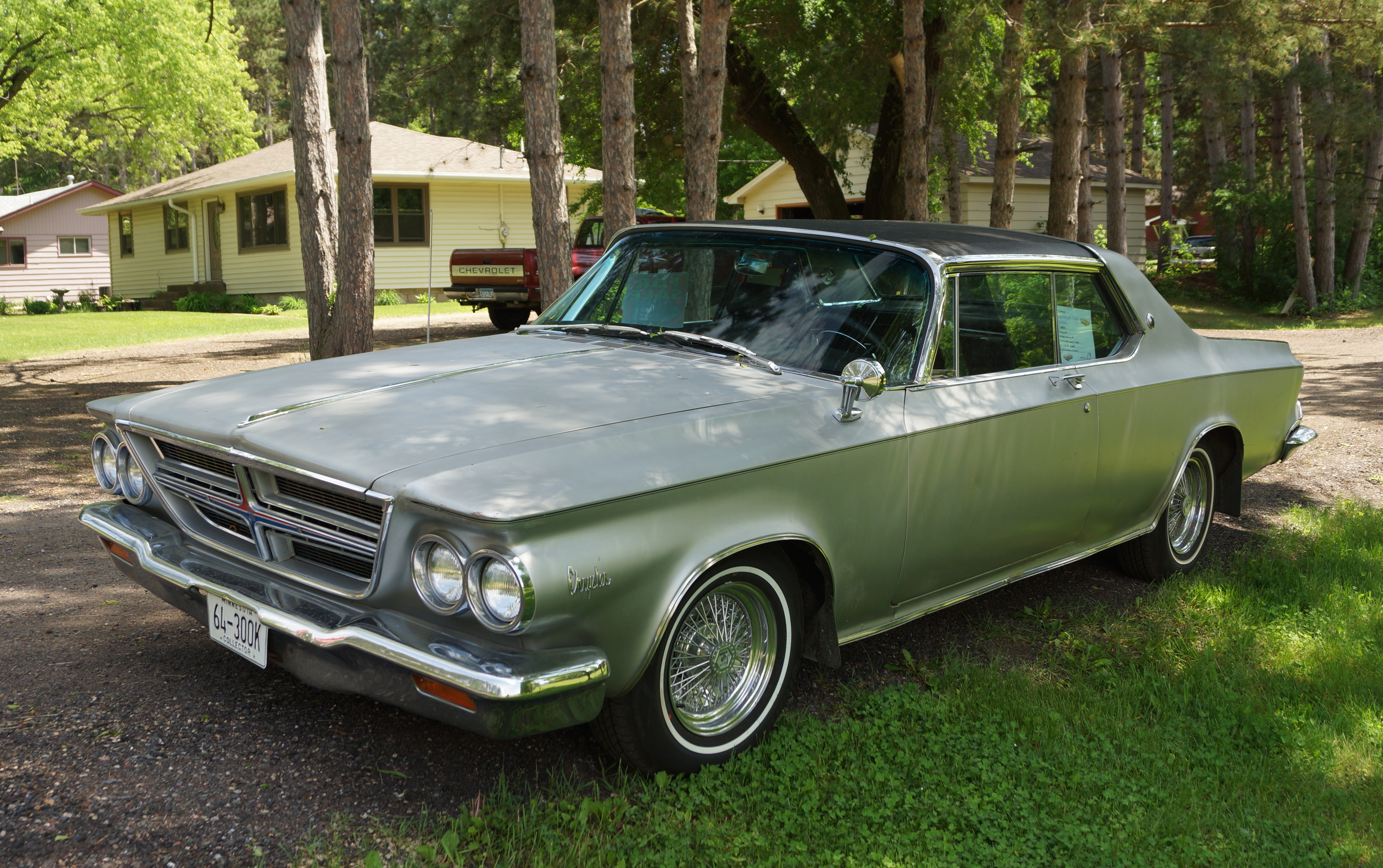
1964 Chrysler 300 K Silver Edition

== Fifth generation ==
=== 1965 300L ===
Chrysler 300L (AC2-P)
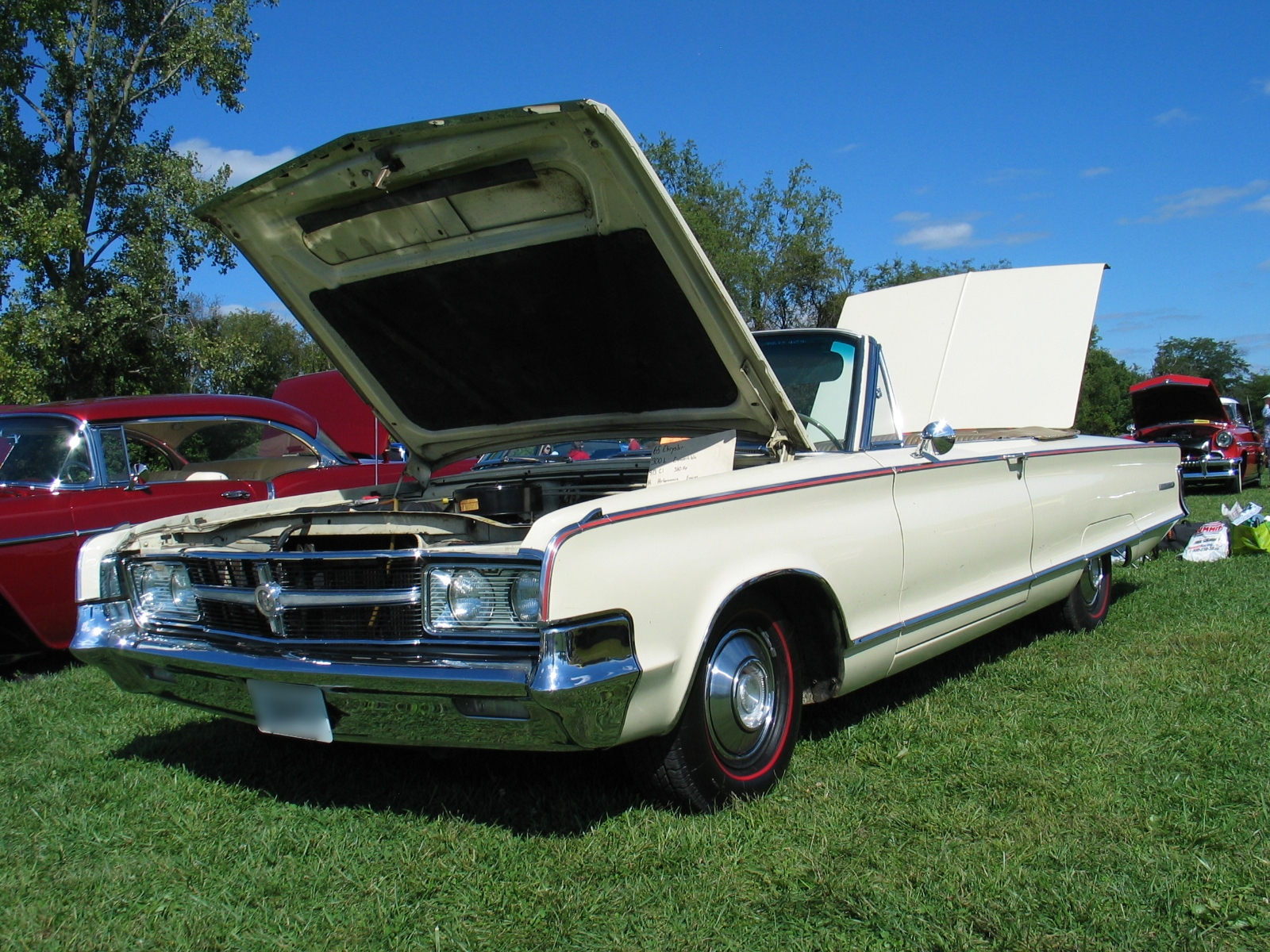

Overview
- Production: 1965; 2,845 produced
- Designer: Elwood Engel (chief engineer); Robert MacGregor Rodger

Body and chassis
- Body style: 2-door hardtop; 2-door convertible
- Platform: Chrysler C platform
- Chassis: unibody
- Related: Chrysler New Yorker; Imperial Crown

Powertrain
- Engine: 413 cu in (6.8 L) Golden Lion V8
- Transmission: 3-speed TorqueFlite automatic; 4-speed manual

Dimensions
- Wheelbase: 124 in (3,150 mm)
- Length: 218.2 in (5,542 mm)
- Width: 79.5 in (2,019 mm)
- Curb weight: 4,251 lb (1,928 kg) (coupe); 4,716 lb (2,139 kg) (convertible)

Chronology
- Successor: Chrysler 300 (1966)

The 1965 300L was the eleventh and final model in the traditional letter series. Like every other 1965 Chrysler, it featured a completely restyled body with the crisp lines, slab sides and a tall greenhouse passenger compartment that were introduced by Elwood Engel, successor of Virgil Exner as Chrysler's head of styling. It was a linear look and the panoramic windshield that had been used since 1957 was abandoned. The car had grown two inches in wheelbase and three inches in overall length. Both 2-door hardtop (with crease lines in the roof sheetmetal for the then-popular "convertible look") and 2-door convertible body styles were available. The cross-ram 390 hp engine had been discontinued, leaving the 413 cu in (6.8 L) engine with regular inlet manifold, single 4-barrel carburetion, unsilenced air cleaner, special camshaft and dual exhaust as the only engine option. With the introduction of the Chrysler B platform Dodge Coronet and the Plymouth Satellite, the performance coupe tradition was handed off from the 300 and the subsequent letter series model naming convention was discontinued.

Engine output was 360 hp (268 kW; 365 PS), as in the previous year. The buyer could choose between the standard 3-speed TorqueFlite automatic and the no-cost option 4-speed manual with Hurst shift linkage. Every feature on the 300L could be ordered as an option on the regular 300; thus, the only difference was the 300L-exclusive ornamentation. This consisted of round "300L" medallions at the center of the die-cast grille star and in the middle of the textured aluminum applique between the taillights, a red-paint-filled full-length beltline molding, and a rectangular die-cast "300" badge on rear fenders.

Tested by car magazine Motor Trend, a TorqueFlite-equipped 300L 2-door Hardtop accelerated from 0 to 60 mph (0 to 97 km/h) in 8.8 seconds, and covered the quarter mile in 17.3 seconds with a terminal speed of 82 mph (132 km/h). A total of 2,405 300L hardtops and 440 convertibles were produced.

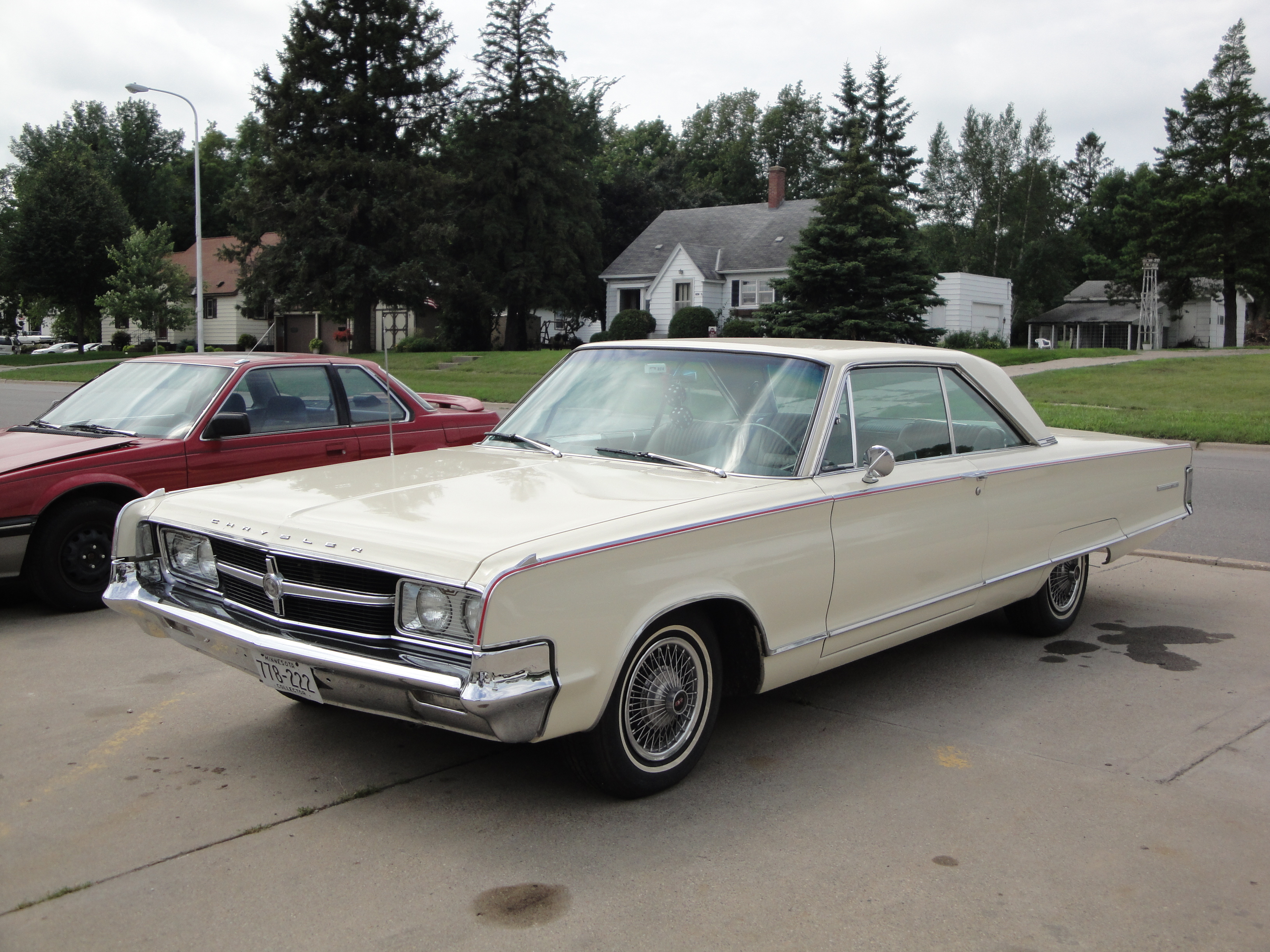
1965 300L 2-door Hardtop

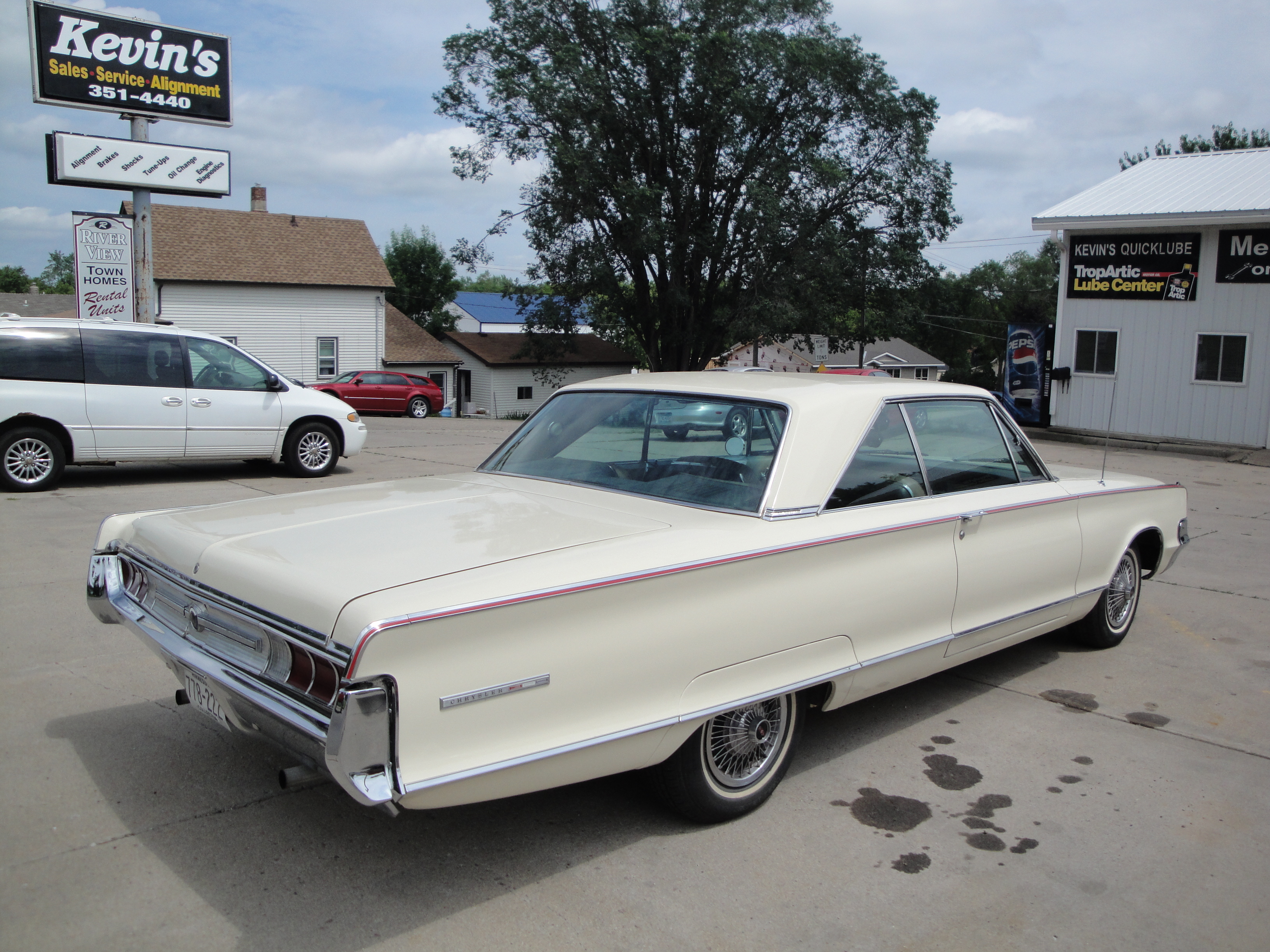
1965 300L 2-door Hardtop (rear view)

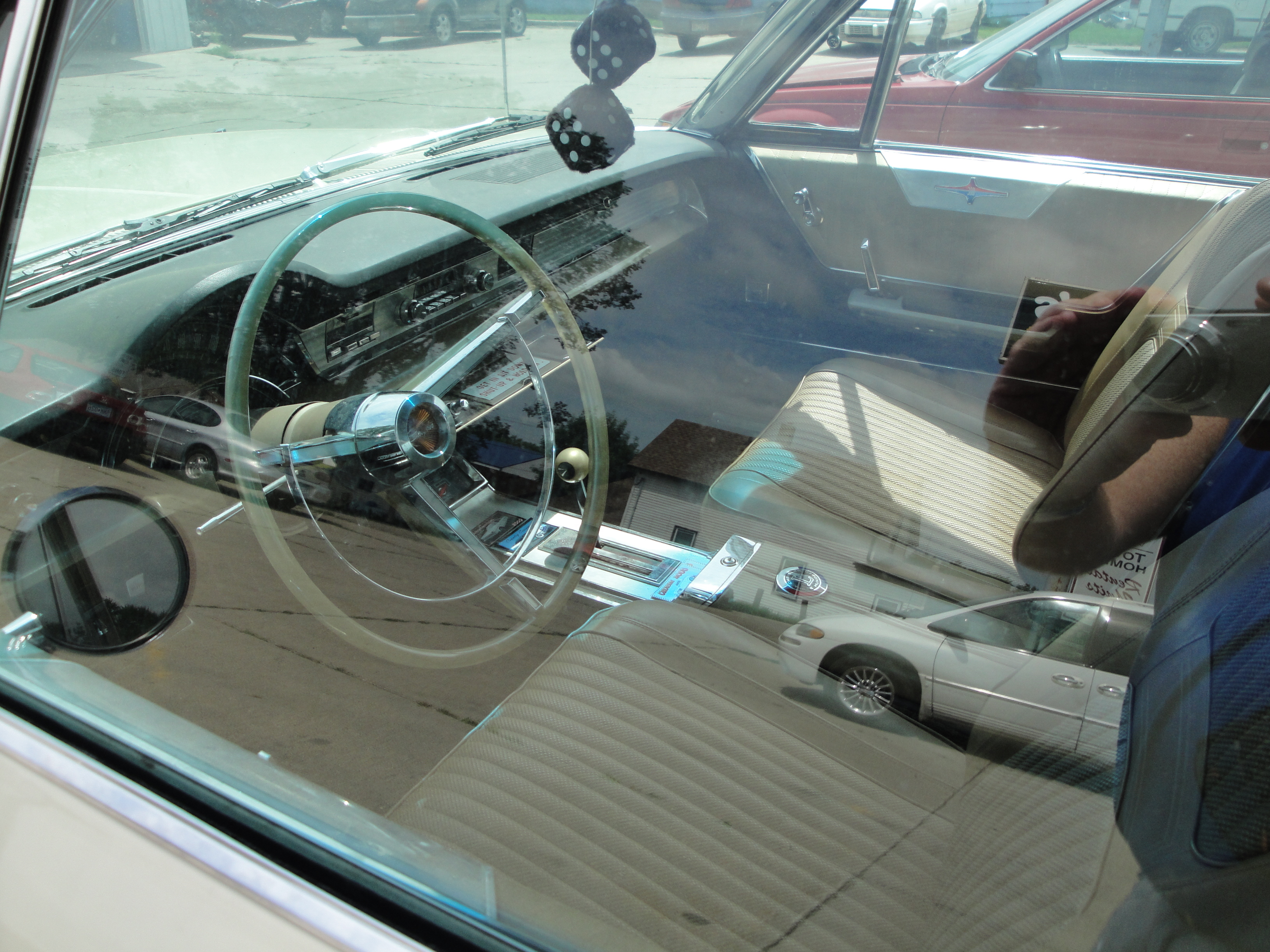
1965 300L 2-door Hardtop (interior)

=== 1966 300M ===
Intending to return the 300 letter series to its roots, Chrysler proposed the 1966 300M as a clay mockup in October 1963. The exterior was similar to the 300L, except the 300M had spinner-type knock off wheel covers with a "300M" medallion in the center, as well as another "300M" medallion on the trunk lid. The front running lights were moved to the center grille bar and the front turn signals were widened. The 300M also had paint stripes along the lower body line instead of the chrome molding found on the non-letter series 300s, "300M" medallions on the sides, script "Three Hundred" badges and unique tail lights and bezels. Three-spoke headlight ornaments were planned, but dropped due to legal issues in some states. The interior was identical to the non-letter series 300 except for the "300M" medallions. The 300M was planned to be powered by the 426 Wedge engine rated at 365 hp (272 kW). This first 300M proposal was cancelled in November 1964 "to reduce scheduling and plant complexity". But in 1965 the 300M was revived, this time powered by the 425 hp (317 kW), 426 Hemi engine and a planned production run of 4298, of which 500 were to have the Hemi engine, a $1250 option. The Hemi cars would also feature a dual-faced "7-Liter Hemi" medallion. This proposal was also cancelled as the letter series 300s had lost their prestige and exclusivity as they were simply non-letter series 300s with letter badges. The 300M name would not be used again until 1999.

== Sixth generation ==
=== 1970 Hurst 300 ===
Hurst 300
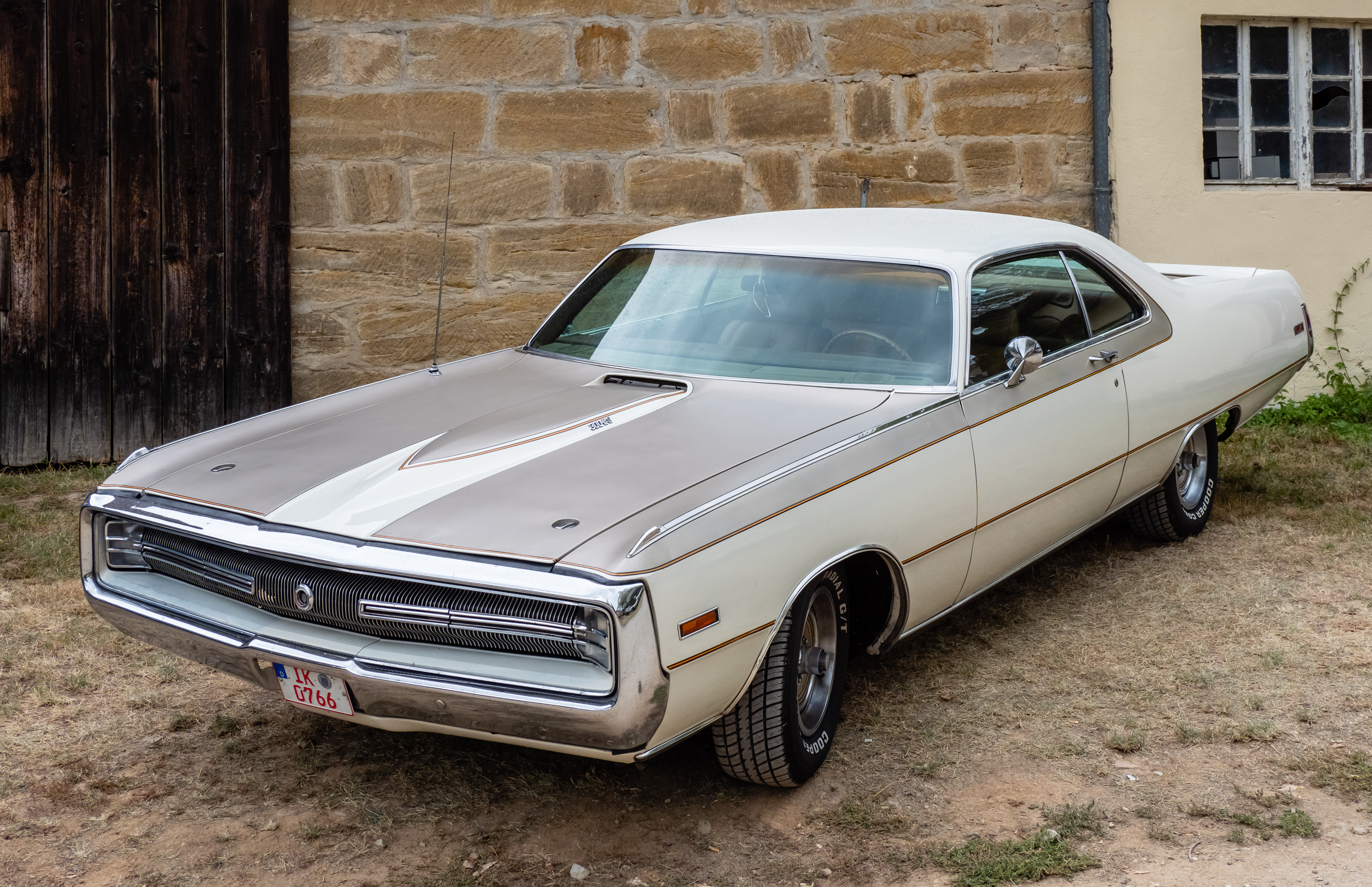

Overview
- Production: 1970; 501 produced

Body and chassis
- Body style: 2-door coupe; 2-door convertible
- Chassis: unibody
- Related: Chrysler Newport

Powertrain
- Engine: 440 cu in (7.2 L) TNT V8
- Transmission: 3-speed Torqueflite A727 automatic

Dimensions
- Wheelbase: 124 inches (3,100 mm)
- Length: 224.7 inches (5,710 mm)
- Width: 79.1 inches (2,010 mm)
- Height: 55.6 inches (1,410 mm)
- Curb weight: 4,400 pounds (2,000 kg)

The 1970 Hurst 300 lacks the single-letter suffix of its forebears and appeared five years after the last Letter Series Chrysler, the 300L. Many automobile historians do not include the Hurst 300 as a Letter Series model. The concept of the car, however, does fit with the Letter Series cars, as it was a high-performance variant of the luxury 300, built with the input of aftermarket parts manufacturer Hurst Performance. Only 485 units are believed to have been built.

The Hurst 300s were all 2-door and shared a Spinnaker White and gold paint scheme similar to the Oldsmobile Hurst/Olds, Pontiac GTO and Pontiac Grand Prix Hurst models of mid-1960s to early 1970s. The scooped hood and trunk lid (with a molded spoiler) are both fiberglass. All Hurst 300s had satin tan leather interiors that were straight out of the Imperial and could be had with column- or console-mounted 727 automatics. All came with the 375 hp (280 kW) 440 cu in (7.2 L) 4-barrel TNT V8 engine. The suggested retail price was US$5,939 ($49,237 in 2025 dollars).

Of the 501 units sold, one convertible is documented having been used as a Hurst promotional car and another is believed to have been dealer equipped with a 426 cu in (7.0 L) Hemi, also, a convertible.

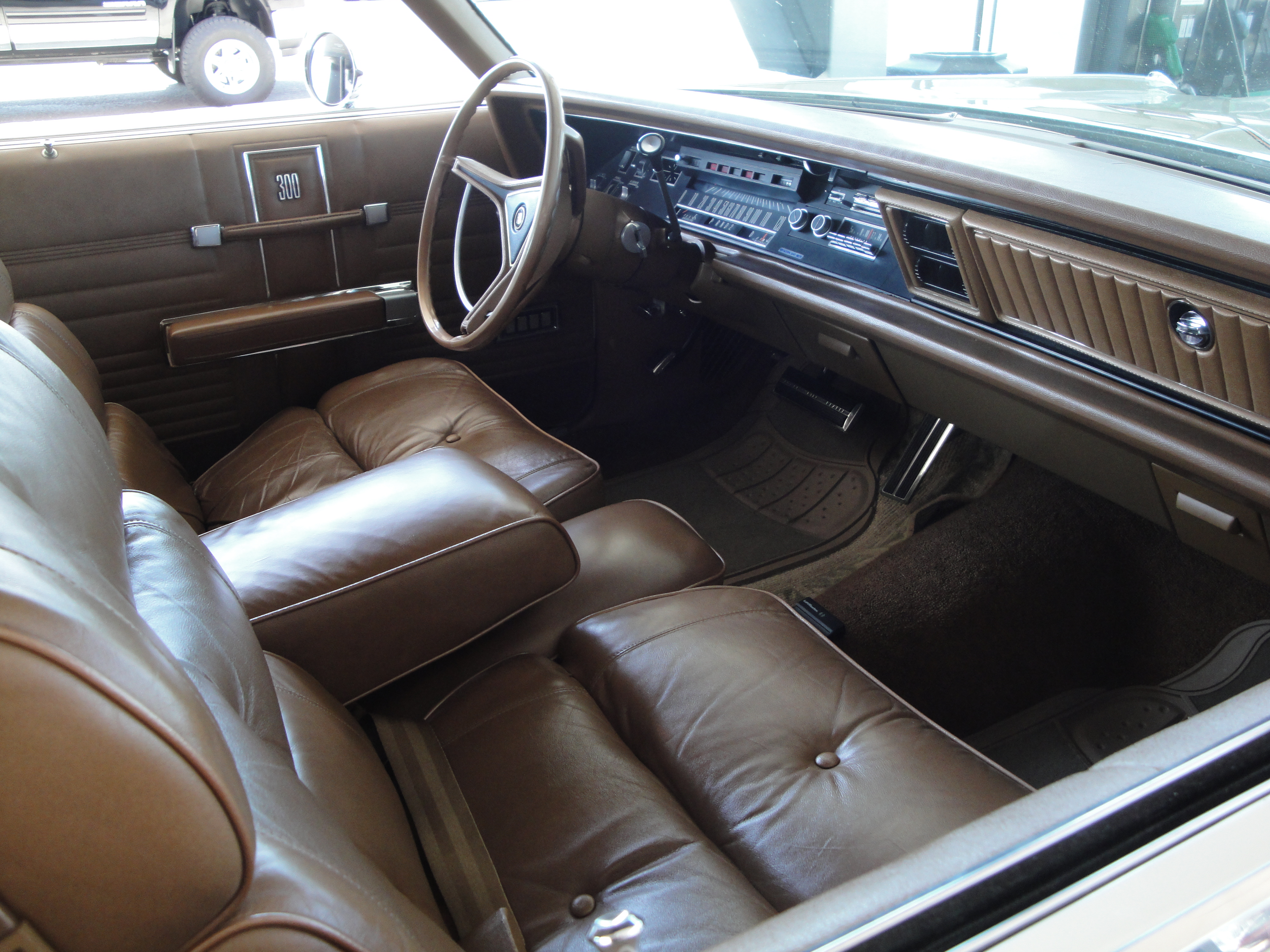
1970 Chrysler 300 Hurst Edition interior

== Collectibility ==
Because of limited production, all original letter series cars are collectibles, but earlier models, including the C-300 and 300B, especially red/maroon examples, are among the most valuable of all 1950s performance cars, on account of their styling, high performance, and rarity. The 300C through 300G convertibles are particularly desirable due to their scarcity and low survival rates; the coming of the regular 300 series cars in 1962 makes the subsequent letter series less desirable to collectors.

At an auction at the Robson Estate in Gainesville, Georgia on November 13, 2010, the sole 1960 300F convertible equipped with the factory 400 hp (298 kW) engine and the Pont-a-Mousson 4-speed sold for $437,250.

There was one concept vehicle called the Chrysler 300, created in 1991. It featured a sports car body and a Viper engine. It was never produced.

The 300 letter series name was resurrected in 1999 on the Chrysler 300M; but it is the 2005 300C that is closest to the original with its rear-wheel drive, and V8 engine once again bearing the "Hemi" name.

== Production numbers ==
1955 (C-)	1,725
1956 (B)	1,102
1957 (C)	2,402
1958 (D)	809
1959 (E)	647
1960 (F)	1,217
1961 (G)	1,617
1962 (H)	570
1963 (J)	400
1964 (K)	3,647
1965 (L)	2,845
1970 (Hurst)	501

== See also ==
- Timeline of most powerful production cars
- Chrysler 300
- Chrysler FirePower engine
- Chrysler RB engine
- Hemi engine
- Sleeper (car)
