= Facel Vega =

French automobile manufacturer

Coordinates: 48.9316256°N 2.2533799°E

Facel SA
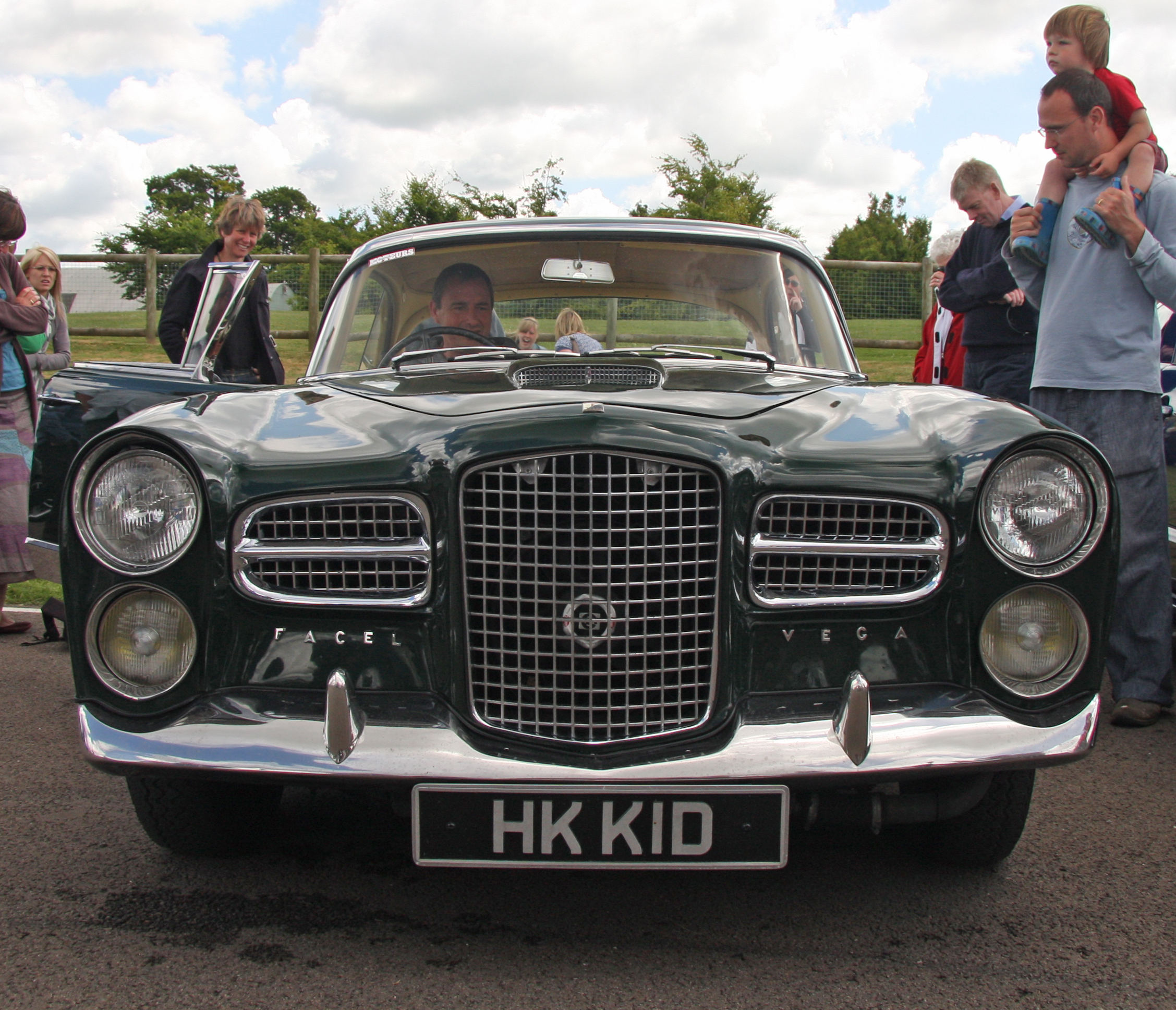
- Industry: Automotive
- Founded: Facel SA 1939
- Defunct: October 1964
- Fate: closed
- Headquarters: Chaillot, Paris, France
- Key people: Jean Daninos
- Products: Automobiles from 1954

Facel S.A. was a French manufacturer of pressed steel automobile components and, subsequently, complete automobiles of their own design.

To intensify its World War II war effort, French subcontracting company for military aeronautics Bronzavia created a subsidiary called Facel (acronym of Forges et Ateliers de Constructions d'Eure-et-Loir) in December 1939. After the war, in 1945, by merging with Métallon, Facel began to make short-run special bodies, coupés or cabriolets for Simca, Ford of France, Panhard and Delahaye. Approximately 2,900 cars of all models were hand-built in Facel's short life.

Unitary bodies without a chassis became general for mass-produced cars, and Facel lost its big customers. French niche manufacturers ceased production. Métallon left the partnership in 1953, and Facel set about designing and making its own complete cars using engines made by Chrysler, Volvo and Austin. Its first design, named Vega, was shown to the public in 1954.

The Facellia model, introduced in 1959, was under-developed, and losses brought about by its warranty problems became impossible to recoup. Prior to closure, Facel had been placed under the control of Sud Aviation subsidiary SFERMA (Société Française d'Entretien et de Réparation de Matériel Aéronautique). Though initially successful, Facel closed its factory in October 1964.

== Business history ==
Facel was founded on 20 December 1939 by Bronzavia, a French manufacturer of military aircraft, to make special components. Marcel Koehler (formerly of motorcycle manufacturer Koehler-Escoffier) directed Facel from 1939 to 1945. He gave way to Jean Daninos when he returned from the United States, summoned by Henri Feuillée, the ex-boss of Bronzavia and a large shareholder of Facel. Jean Daninos had begun his career with Citroen, where he assisted in the design of the Traction coupés and cabriolets. He moved to Morane-Saulnier, then in 1937 to Bronzavia as technical director. During WWII he worked in the US with General Aircraft, which was using Bronzavia patents, but he returned in 1945 and took charge of Facel. Daninos merged Facel with Métallon, a tie maintained until January 1953.

Coachwork provider

Daninos had Facel begin manufacturing short-run and special complete finished bodies for the major French brands. In conjunction with l'Aluminium Français Facel designed the all-aluminium alloy Panhard Dyna X and then built around 45,000 examples for Panhard. The body work assembly division was established in 1948. It made various models of Simca Sport and drew publicity by designing with Pininfarina and then building a special body on a Bentley Mark VI chassis. The car was named the Bentley Cresta. The exercise was repeated in 1951 and named Cresta II. September 1951 saw the introduction of its Ford Comète. Production of the Comète ended in 1955 when Simca took over Ford France. The styling of the Crestas and Comètes was developed into the shape of the first Vega.

Scooter bodies, truck bodies, tractor bodies, jeeps and smaller components

During the same period, Facel-Metallon pressed out body panels for Delahaye's army jeeps (painted and upholstered); Simca, Delahaye and Somua's trucks (painted and upholstered); scooters by Vespa, Piaggio and Motobécane; tractors by Massey Ferguson; and stainless-steel bumpers, hubcaps and grilles for Simca/Ford and for Renault.

Aviation

In conjunction with Hispano-Suiza, Facel-Métallon and Facel also turned out combustion chambers in special metals for Rolls-Royce jet engines.

Postwar Coupés and Cabriolets manufactured by Facel for other automakers

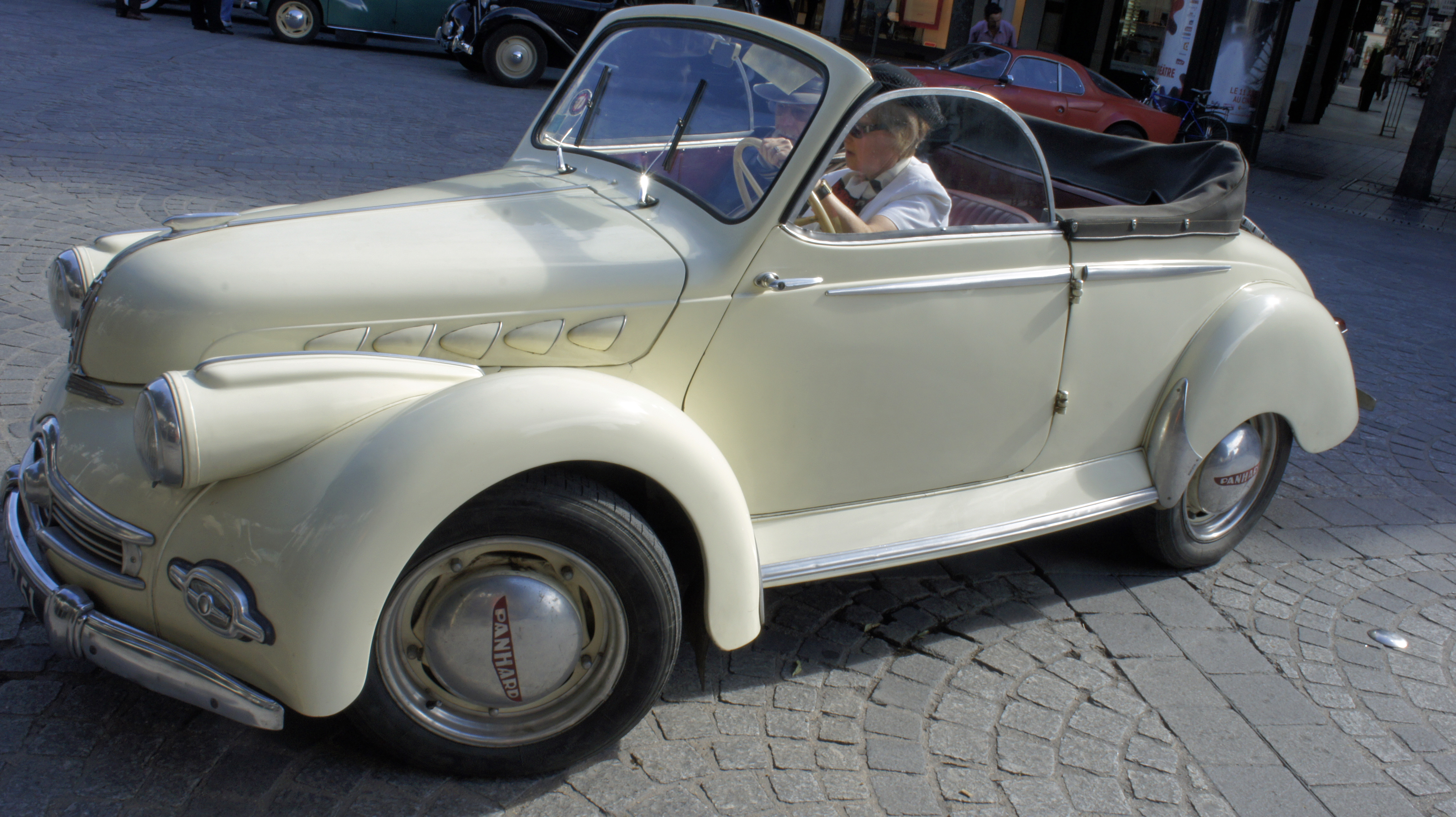
Panhard Dyna X décapotable

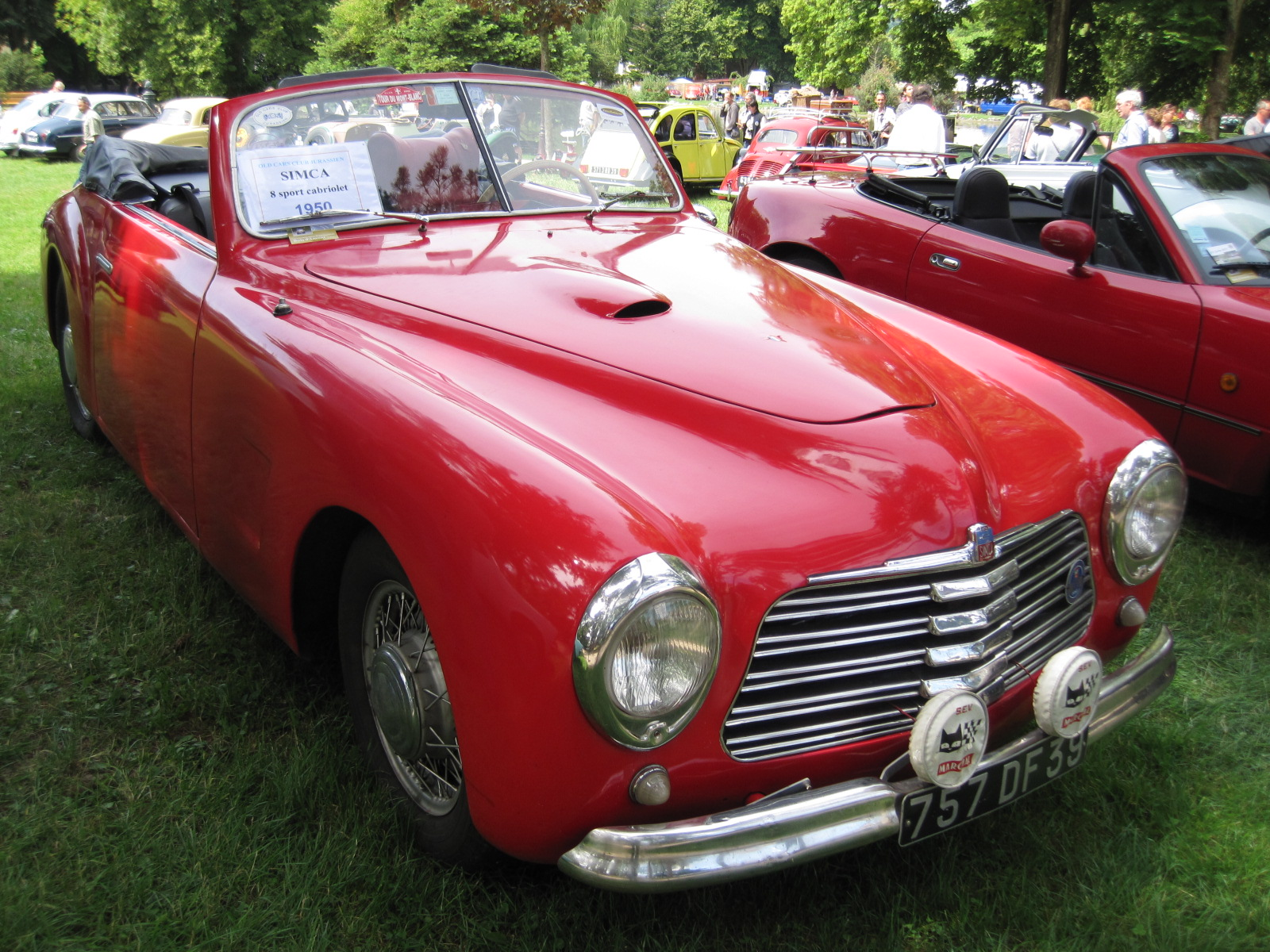
Simca 8 sport cabriolet

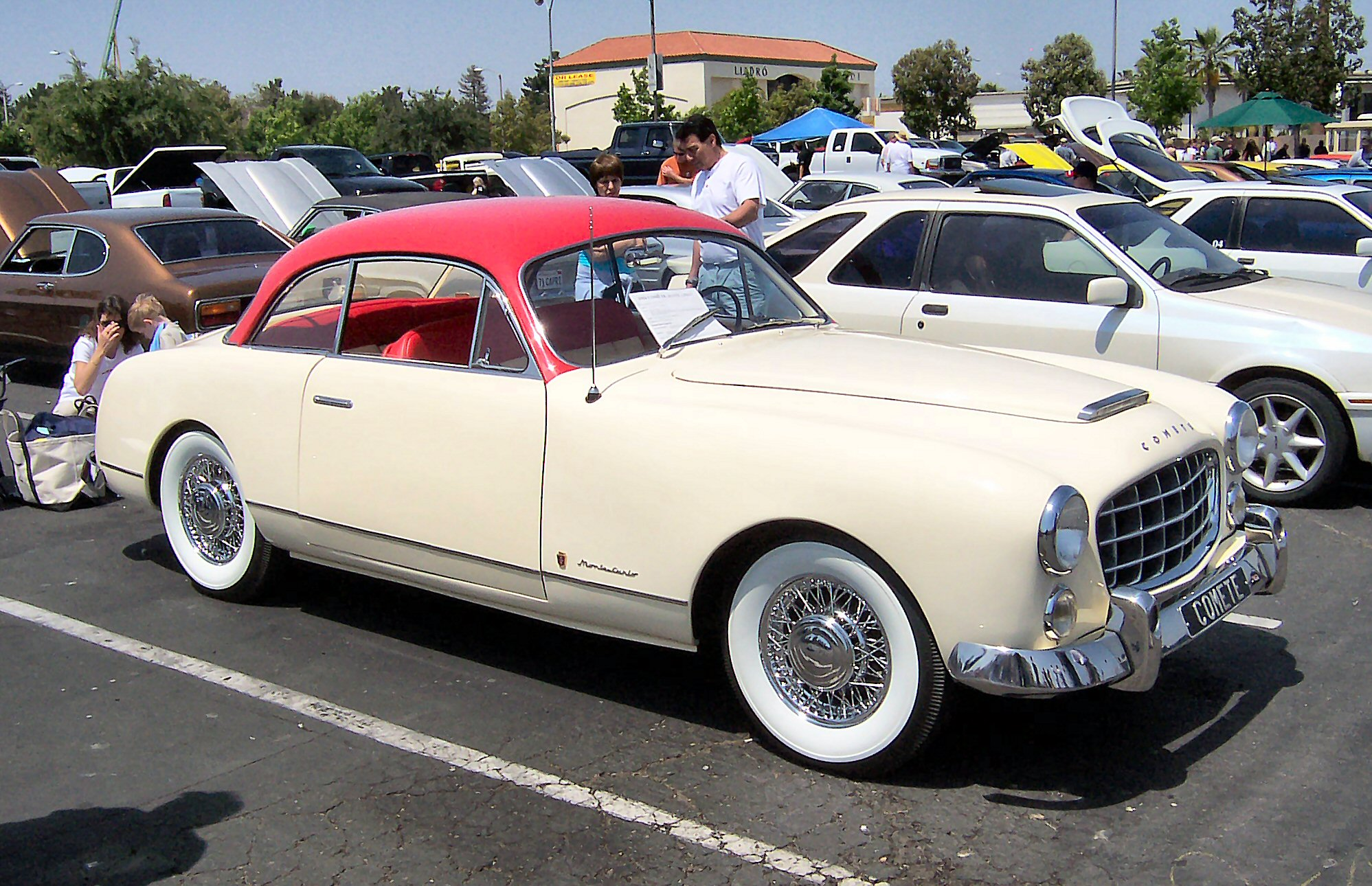
Ford Comète coupé

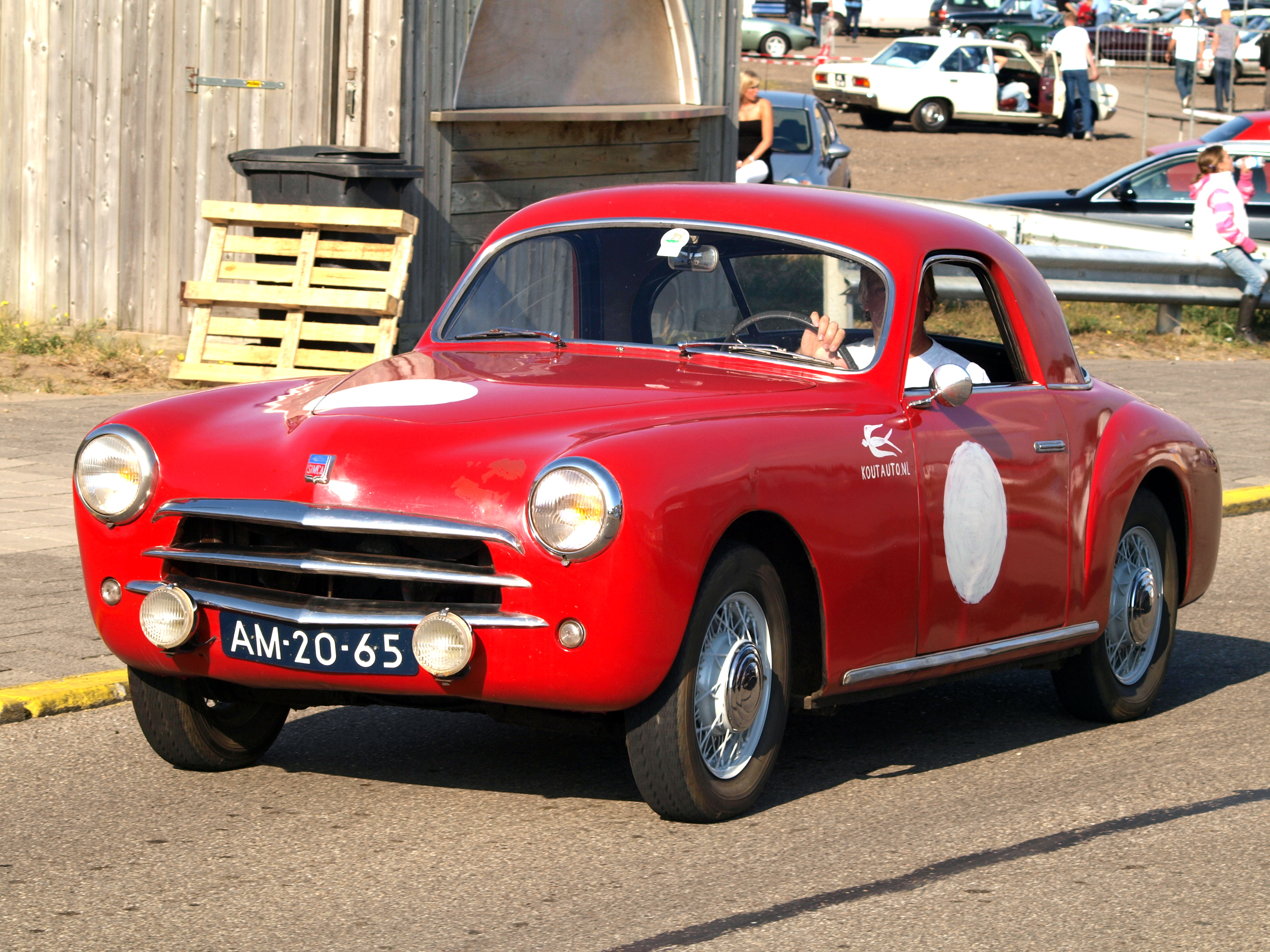
Simca 9 sport coupé

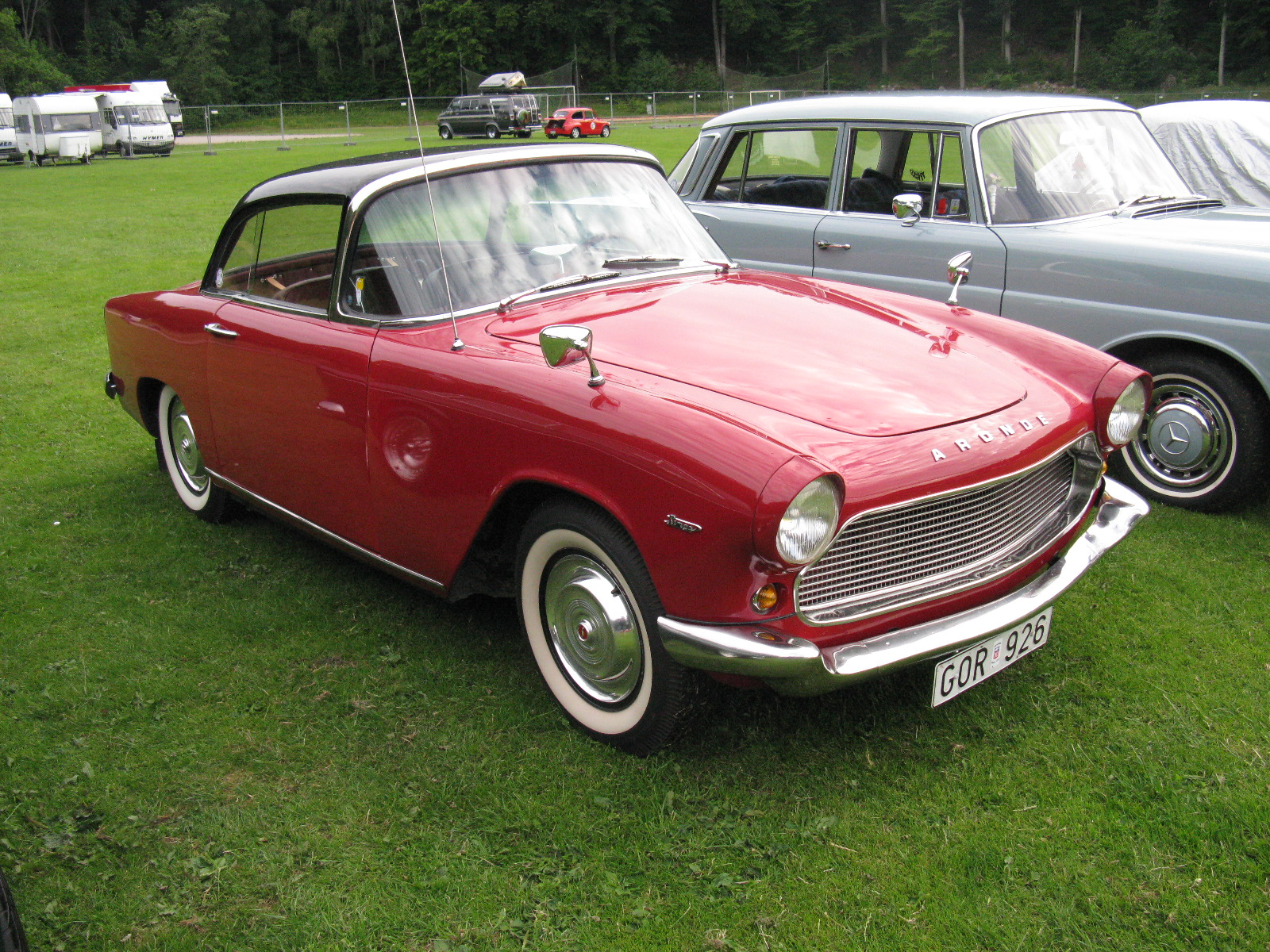
Simca Aronde coupé

== Facel Vega ==
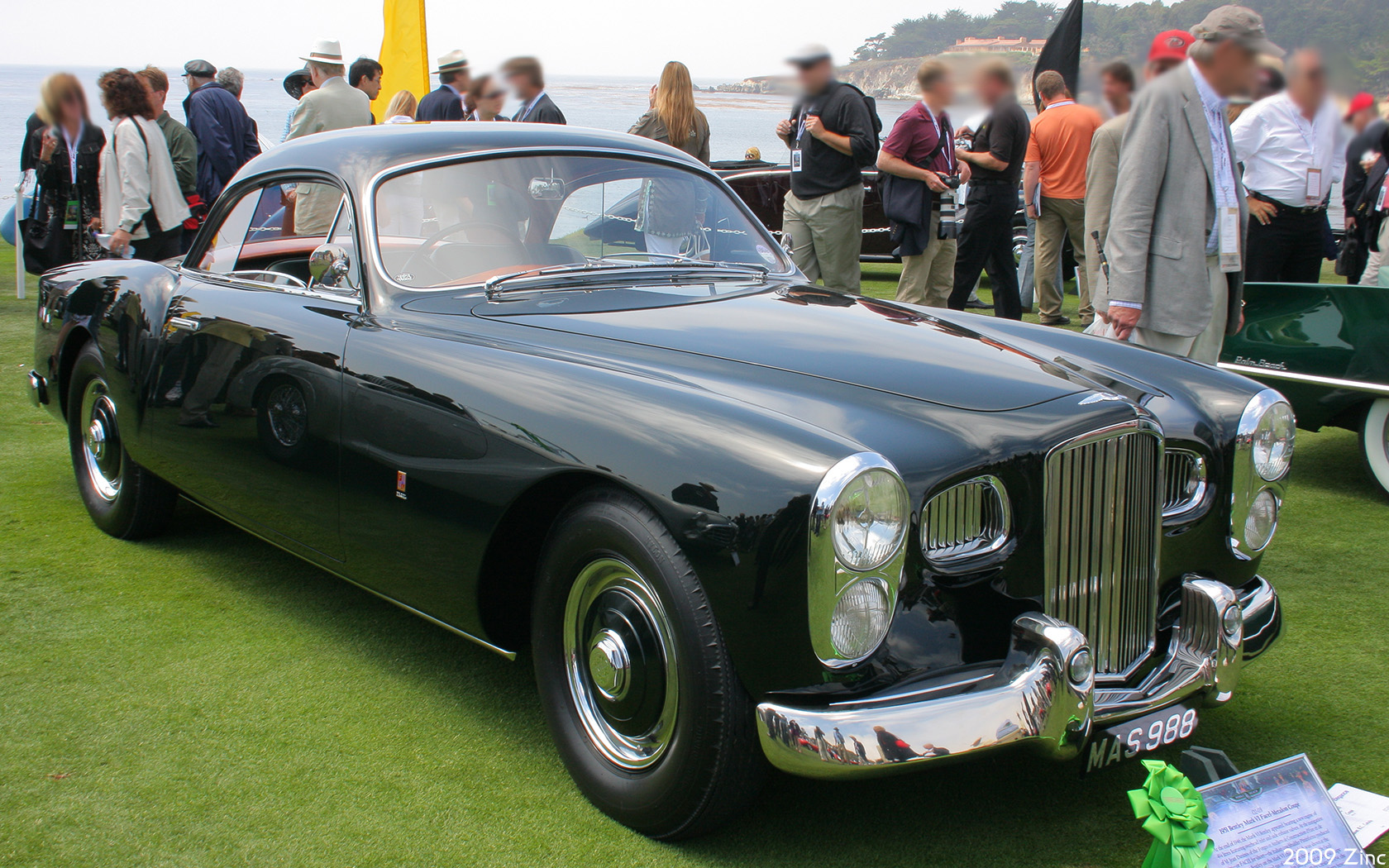
Facel-Métallon bodied 1951 Bentley Mark VI

The Facel Vega marque was created on 22 July 1954 by Jean Daninos, (brother of the humorist Pierre Daninos, who wrote Les Carnets du Major Thompson), although the Facel company had been established by the Bronzavia Company in 1939 as a subcontracting company for the aviation industry. FACEL (Forges et Ateliers de Construction d'Eure-et-Loir, in English: forge and construction workshop of the department of Eure-et-Loir) was initially a metal-stamping company but it expanded into car manufacturing in the early 1950s.

Facel entered the automobile business as a supplier of special bodies for Panhard, Delahaye and Simca. The company was headquartered in Paris at 19 Avenue George V, and had the main assembly factory in Colombes at 132 Boulevard de Valmy, with parts supplied from the outskirts of the city in Amboise, Dreux and Puteaux.

=== Facel Vega FV, HK500 and Facel Vega II ===
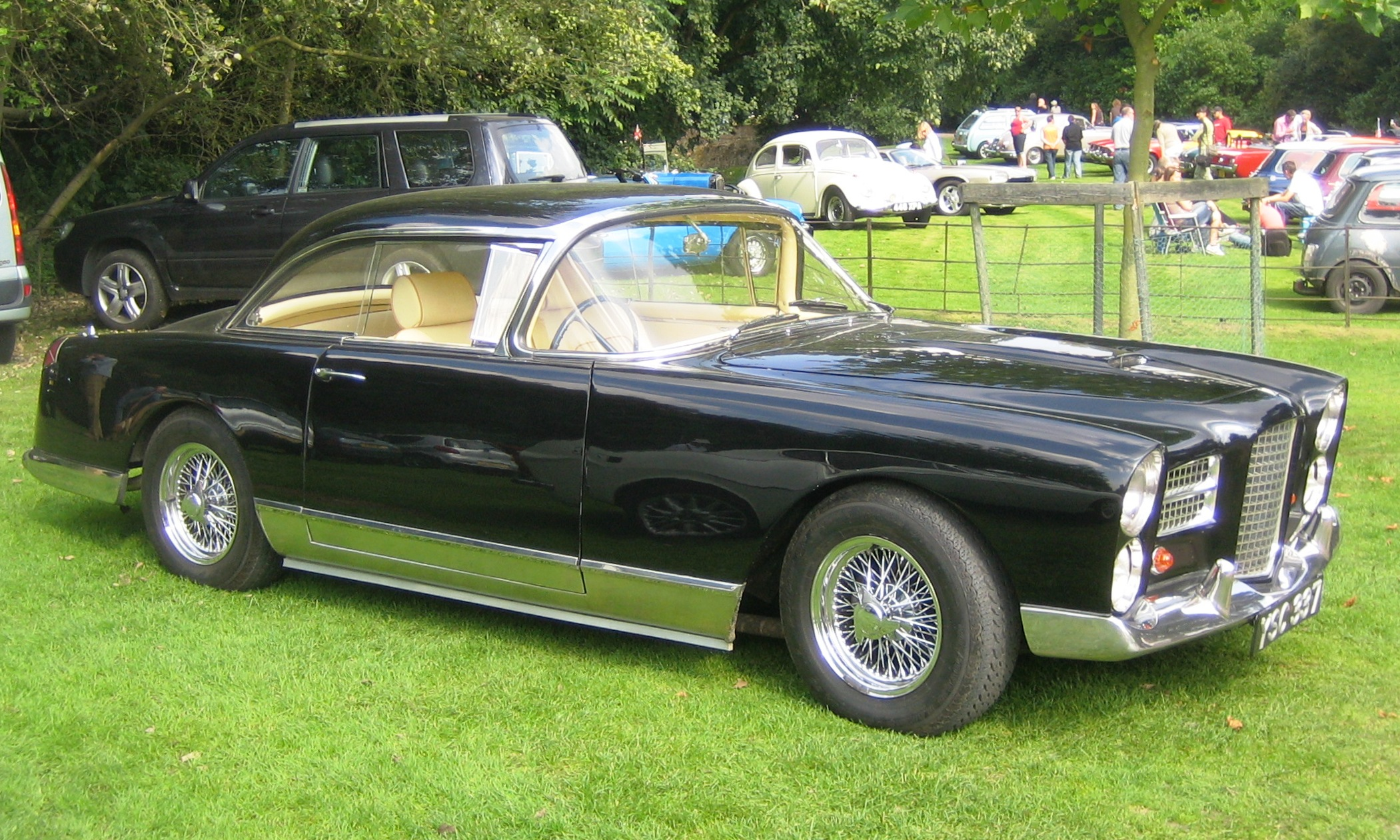
Facel Vega HK500 1961

The Vega production cars (FV, later and more famously the HK500) first appeared in October 1954 at the Salon de l'Automobile Paris using Chrysler V8 engines because no French company at the time produced an engine that met the company's objectives. Initially, a 4.5 L (276 cu in) DeSoto Hemi engine was installed, while the overall engineering was straightforward, with a tubular chassis, double wishbone suspension at the front and a live axle at the back, as in standard American practice. They were also as heavy as American cars, at about 1,800 kg (3,968 lb). Performance was brisk, with a top speed of around 190 km/h (118 mph) and 0–100 km/h (62 mph) in just under 10 seconds.

Most cars were two-door hardtops with no centre pillar, but a few convertibles were built for special customers (including Daninos' wife: eleven of the FV series and a single HK500 were drop tops, out of 842 built in total) in spite of Daninos' dislike of the bodystyle due to its lack of structural rigidity. Fully 77 percent of the production was exported, due to the punitive Tax horsepower system in France.

The 1956 model was improved with a bigger 5.4 L (331 cu in) Chrysler Hemi engine and updated transmission and other mechanicals. In the same year, production began of a four-door model, the Excellence, with rear-hinged doors (suicide doors) at the back and no centre pillar. The pillarless design unfortunately made it less rigid and the handling was thus poorer than that of the two-door cars, and surviving examples are rare.

1959 models had even bigger engines, a 5.8 L (354 cu in) and later a 6.28 L (383 cu in) Chrysler Typhoon engine, and were quite a bit faster despite their extra weight. The final evolution of the V8 models came in 1962 with the Facel Vega II, which was lighter, with sleeker, more modern lines, substantially faster, and famously elegant.

=== Facellia ===
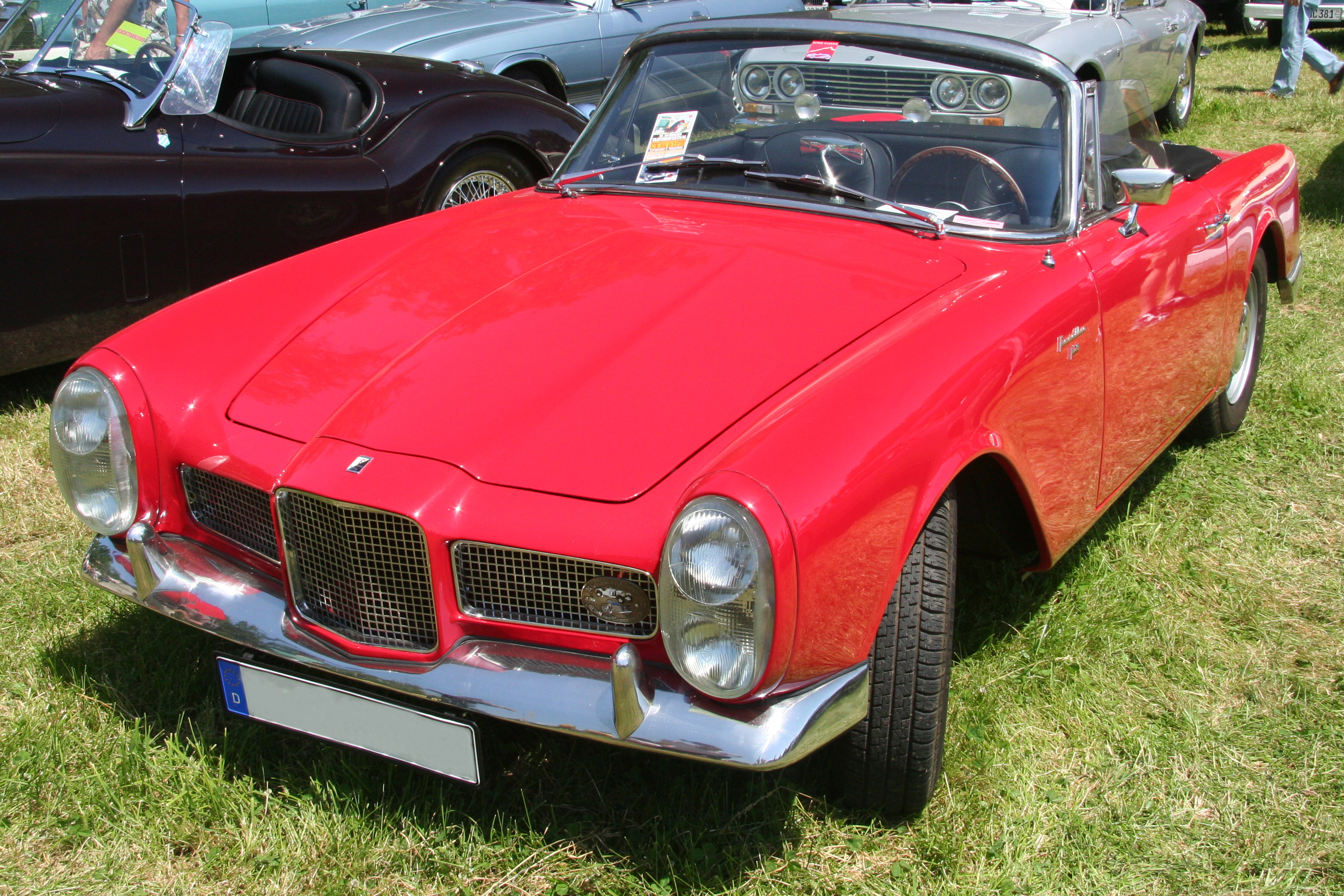
Facellia F2, 1961 to 1963

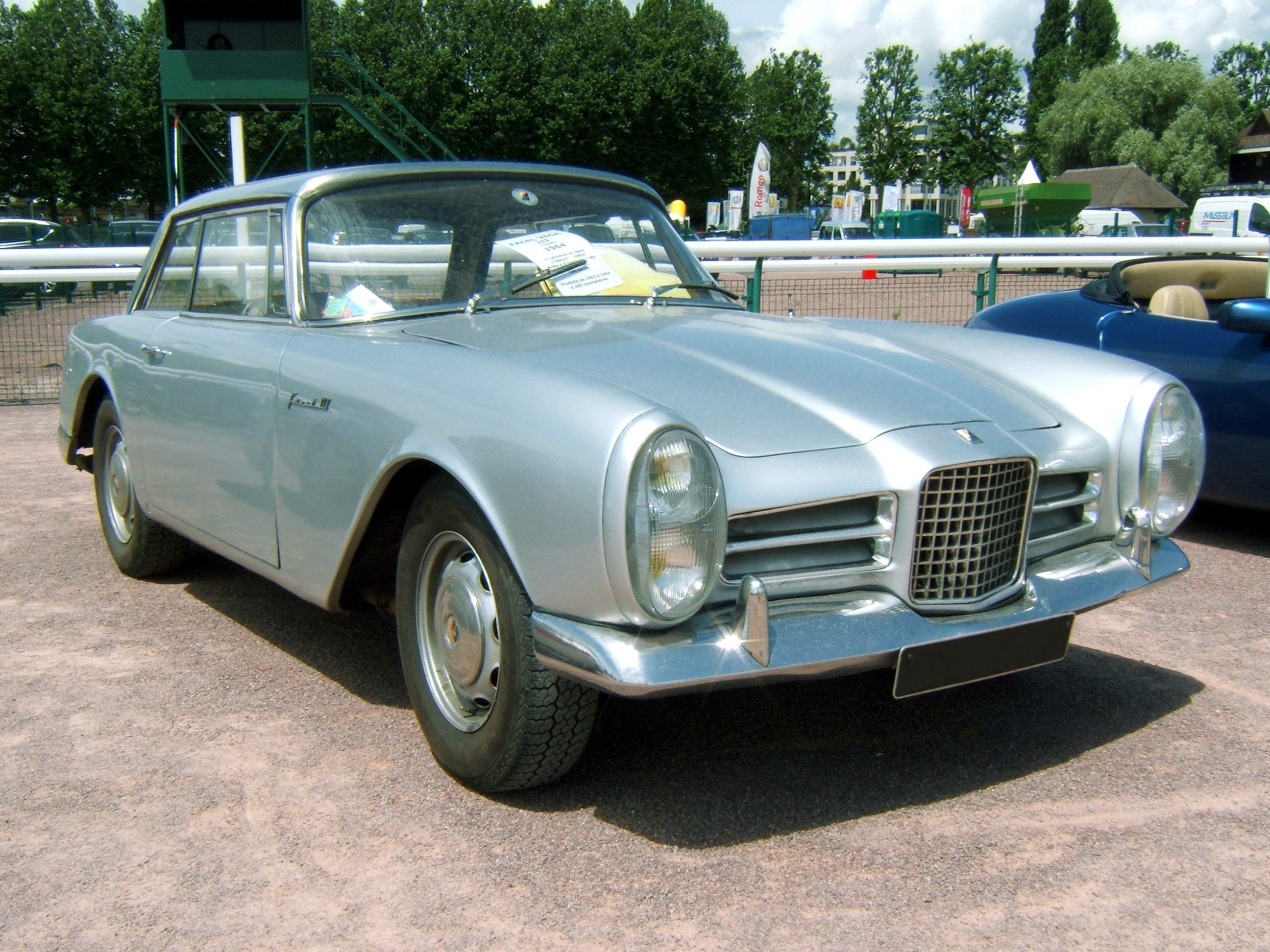
Facel III

In 1960, Facel entered the sports car market with the Facellia, with a premiere at the Paris Motor Show in 1959. It was a small car similar in size to the then popular Mercedes 190SL. Facellias were advertised in three body styles: cabriolet, 2+2 coupé and 4-seater coupé — all with the same mechanical parts and a 2,450 mm (96.5 in) wheelbase. Styling was similar to the Facel HK500, but with rather elegant (though fingernail-breaking) flush door handles. Following Facel Vega's demise several of M Daninos's styling cues were "borrowed" by Mercedes-Benz. Prices were roughly US$4,000 for the Facellia ($43,532 in 2025 dollars), US$5,500 for the Facel III ($54,415 in 2025 dollars) and US$6,000 for the Facel 6 ($65,298 in 2025 dollars).

With the idea of creating a mass-produced all-French sports car competing with the Alfa Romeo Giulietta, the Triumph TR3 and Porsche 356B, Facel moved away from Chrysler engines because Chrysler didn't offer a four-cylinder engine at the time. Instead, the Facellia had a four-cylinder 1.6 L twin-cam engine designed by former Talbot-Lago chief engineer Carlo Machetti, who won at Le Mans, along with the advice of famed English cylinder-head guru Harry Weslake, and built in France by Paul Cavallier of the Pont-à-Mousson company (which already provided manual gear boxes for the company's larger models) so as to be compliant with the punitive French horsepower tax system and increase sales. The engine had only two bearings supporting each camshaft, using special steels, as opposed to the usual four or five. Despite the metallurgical experience of Pont-à-Mousson, this resulted in excessive flex, timing problems, and frequent engine failures.

Famed engineers Charles Deutsch and Jean Bertin were called in to solve the issues, but it was not enough and the engine was pronounced a disaster and the Facellia with it. The updated Facellia F2 was presented at the March 1961 Geneva Motor Show. Company president, Jean Daninos having been obliged to resign in August 1961 in response to the company's financial problems, the new boss, a former oil company executive called André Belin, gave strict instructions to the after-sales department to respond to customer complaints about broken Facellia engines by replacing the units free of charge without creating "difficulties". The strategy was intended to restore confidence among the company's customer base. It would certainly have created a large hole in the income statement under the "warranty costs" heading, but it may have been too late for customer confidence.

Volvo engine

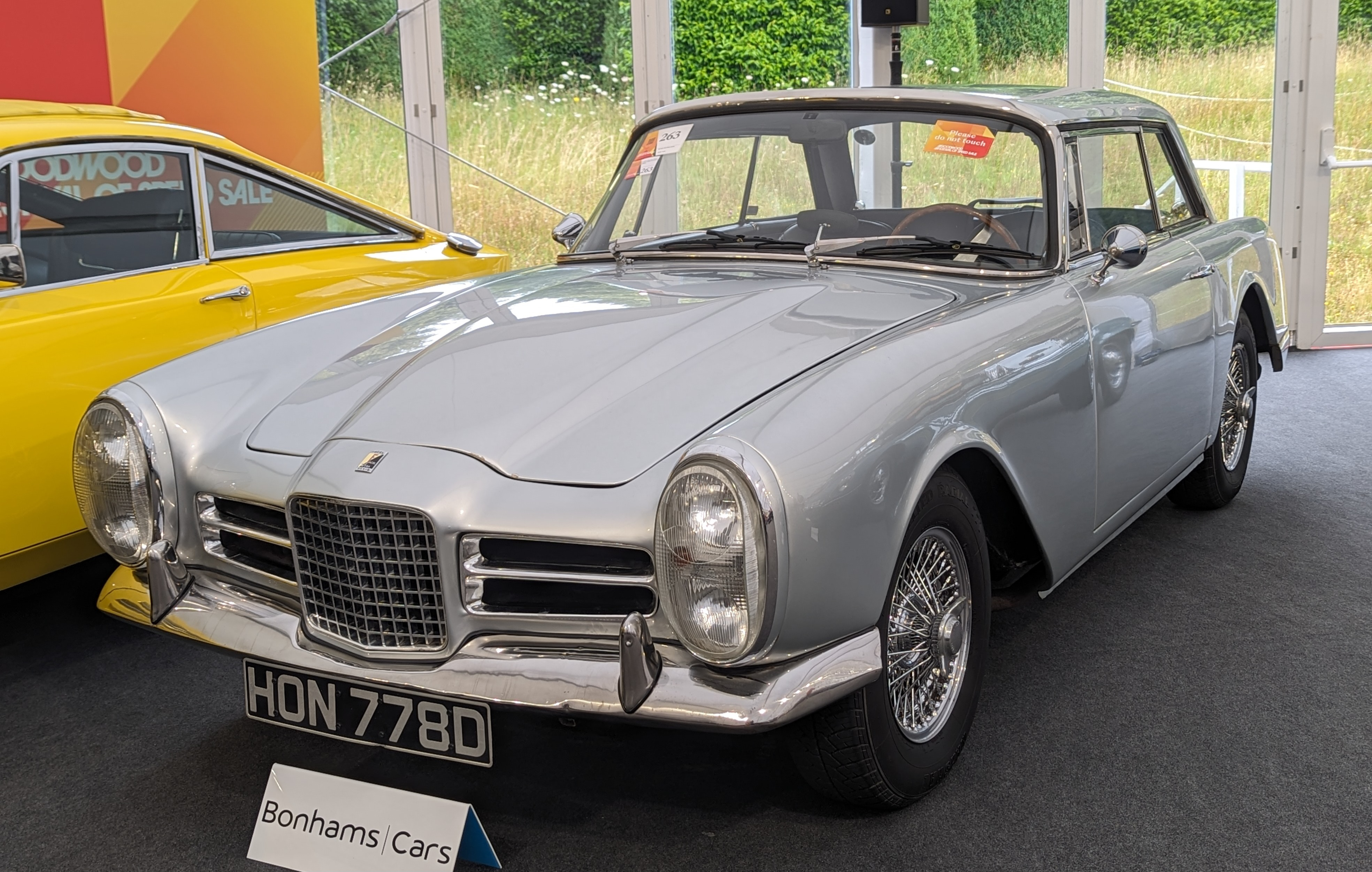
A 1964 Facel 6 for sale by Bonhams at Goodwood in 2023

The troublesome powerplant was replaced with a Volvo B18 engine in the Facel III, but the damage was done. Production was stopped in 1963 and despite the vision of it being a "volume" car, only 1,100 were produced - still enough to make this Facel's highest production number. Facel lost money on every car they built, with the luxury car side of the company being supported entirely by the other work done by Facel-Métallon.

The small Facellia met with little success and the losses from this, due to strong competition at the luxury end of the market, killed off the business which closed its doors at the end of October 1964. What was, according to some, the best small Facel, the Facel 6, which used an Austin-Healey 2.8-litre engine, came too late to save the company with fewer than 30 having been produced when the financial guarantors withdrew their support.

=== Prominence ===
Prominent owners of Facel Vegas (mainly of Facel IIs) included Pablo Picasso, Ava Gardner, Christian Dior, Herb Alpert, Joan Collins, Ringo Starr, Max Factor Jr, Joan Fontaine, Stirling Moss, Tony Curtis, several Saudi princes, Dean Martin, Fred Astaire, Danny Kaye, Louis Malle, The President of Mexico, François Truffaut, Robert Wagner, Anthony Quinn, Hassan II, King of Morocco, Debbie Reynolds, the Shah of Iran, Frank Sinatra, Maurice Trintignant, Brian Rix, Joe Hepworth and French Embassies around the world. Race-car driver Stirling Moss would drive his HK500 from event to event rather than fly.

French writer and Nobel Prize winner Albert Camus died in a Facel Vega FV2 driven by his publisher's nephew, Michel Gallimard. At the time of his death, Camus had planned to travel by train, with his wife and children, but at the last minute accepted Gallimard's proposal to travel with him instead.

=== Models ===
- Facel Vega FV
- Facel Vega HK500
- Facel Vega II
- Facel Vega Excellence
- Facel Vega Facellia
- Facel III
- Facel 6
