= Facel Vega Excellence =

Facel-Vega Excellence
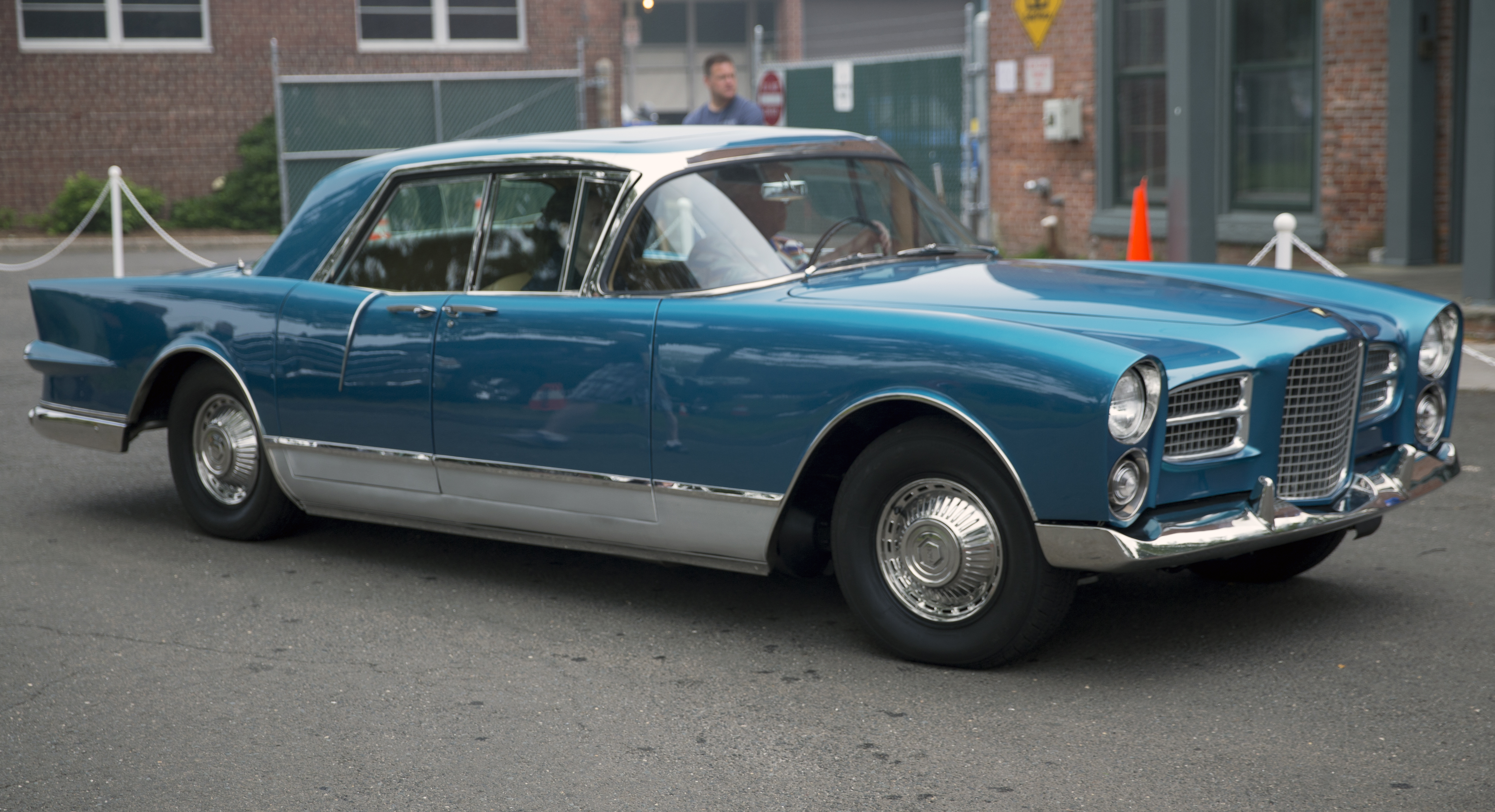
- 1961 Facel Vega Excellence EX1

Overview
- Manufacturer: Facel-Vega
- Production: 1958–1964; 156 built
- Assembly: Colombes, Paris, France

Body and chassis
- Class: Full-size luxury car
- Body style: 4-door hardtop

Powertrain
- Engine: Chrysler Hemi V8: 5.9, 6.3, 6.4 litres
- Transmission: 4 speed manual by Pont-à-Mousson; 3-speed Chrysler Torqueflite automatic

Dimensions
- Wheelbase: 3,170 mm (125 in) EX1; 3,180 mm (125 in) EX2
- Length: 5,235 mm (206.1 in) EX1; 5,280 mm (208 in) EX2
- Width: 1,830 mm (72 in)
- Height: 1,380 mm (54 in)
- Curb weight: 1,920 kg (4,233 lb)

The Facel Vega Excellence is a luxury saloon automobile produced by French manufacturer Facel Vega, that was unveiled at the Paris Auto Show in October 1956.

Production started in 1958 and lasted until the company ceased production in 1964. The car was based on an elongated chassis from the Facel Vega FV Coupé. It was the only four-door model the company ever made. Production ended after only 156 cars had been built. The low production figure is likely a result of the car's high purchase price listed at US$12,800 ($139,501 in 2024 official inflation dollars). When new, the Excellence cost around as much as four Citroën DS saloons, and was an alternative to the Rolls-Royce Silver Cloud, Mercedes-Benz 600 and Lagonda Rapide. The price could still be boosted higher by ordering optional equipment, which gradually became available over the car's production run, such as power steering, power brakes, electric windows, and air conditioning also sourced from Chrysler along with wire-spoke wheels from Kelsey-Hays.

== Design ==
The Excellence features some styling elements typically found on American cars of the era, such as tailfins, the wraparound windshield, and the "hardtop" roof without B-pillars. The overall design, however, is regarded as distinctively European, with its stacked quad-headlights and rakishly low profile. Its low beltline and comparatively high greenhouse predicted the automotive architecture that became mainstream in the late Fifties, and lasted throughout the Sixties. The Facel-Vega Excellence also incorporates a pillarless four-door mechanism, allowing the car to be designed with rear-hinged "suicide" styled rear doors for easier access and egress. The doors came in contact with a large pin installed at the door sill base that allowed either the front or rear doors to open independently of each other, and when closed, the doors added structural integrity. This layout could also be found on the limited production Cadillac Eldorado Brougham, which was unveiled later in 1956, and on the 1961–1969 Lincoln Continental.

In the interior, the car features leather seats, a faux burled walnut dashboard with full instrumentation provided by Jaeger-LeCoultre, and a make up kit located in the back of the centre armrest, consisting of a chrome-handled brush and comb, and two perfume bottles, the latter albeit being supplied empty by the factory.

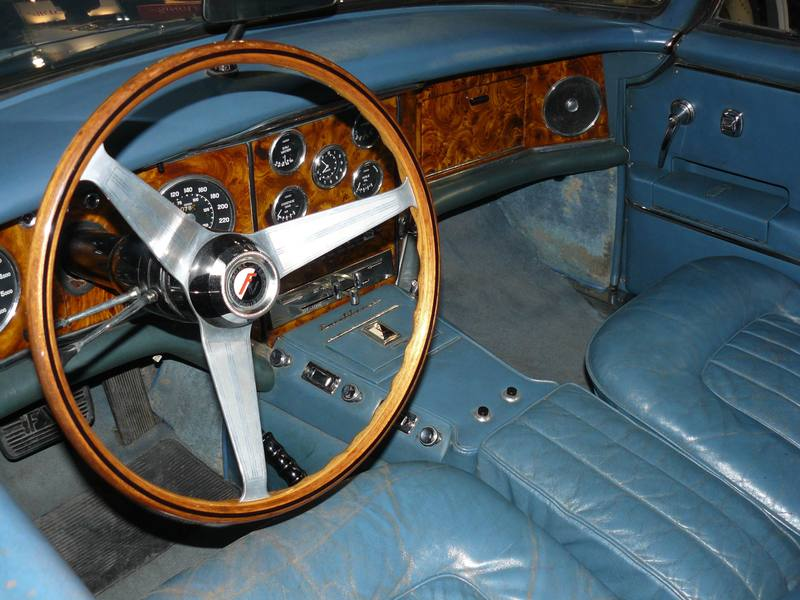
Excellence interior

In an article for the November 1985 edition of Collectible Automobile Magazine, automotive historian Richard Langworth stated his opinion that "The Excellence is a large vehicle...better suited as a car of State rather than a daily driver".

=== Chrysler connection ===
Powered by contemporary Chrysler V8 engines like other Facel-Vega cars, the initial Excellences were fitted with Hemi engines, which Chrysler discontinued for the 1958 model year. Facel-Vega continued to use those engines until their stocks were used up in late 1958. From then on, V8 powered Facel-Vega models were powered by the Chrysler B-series "Wedge" big-block engines.

All Chrysler powered Facel-Vegas could be had with either the Pont-à-Mousson built four-speed manual, or the Chrysler built Torqueflite three-speed automatic. Whereas the American automatic transmission was optional for the Facel-Vegas, the French manual gearbox conversely became optionally available in the Chrysler 300 high-performance model.

== 1958 (Model 'EX') ==
First generation
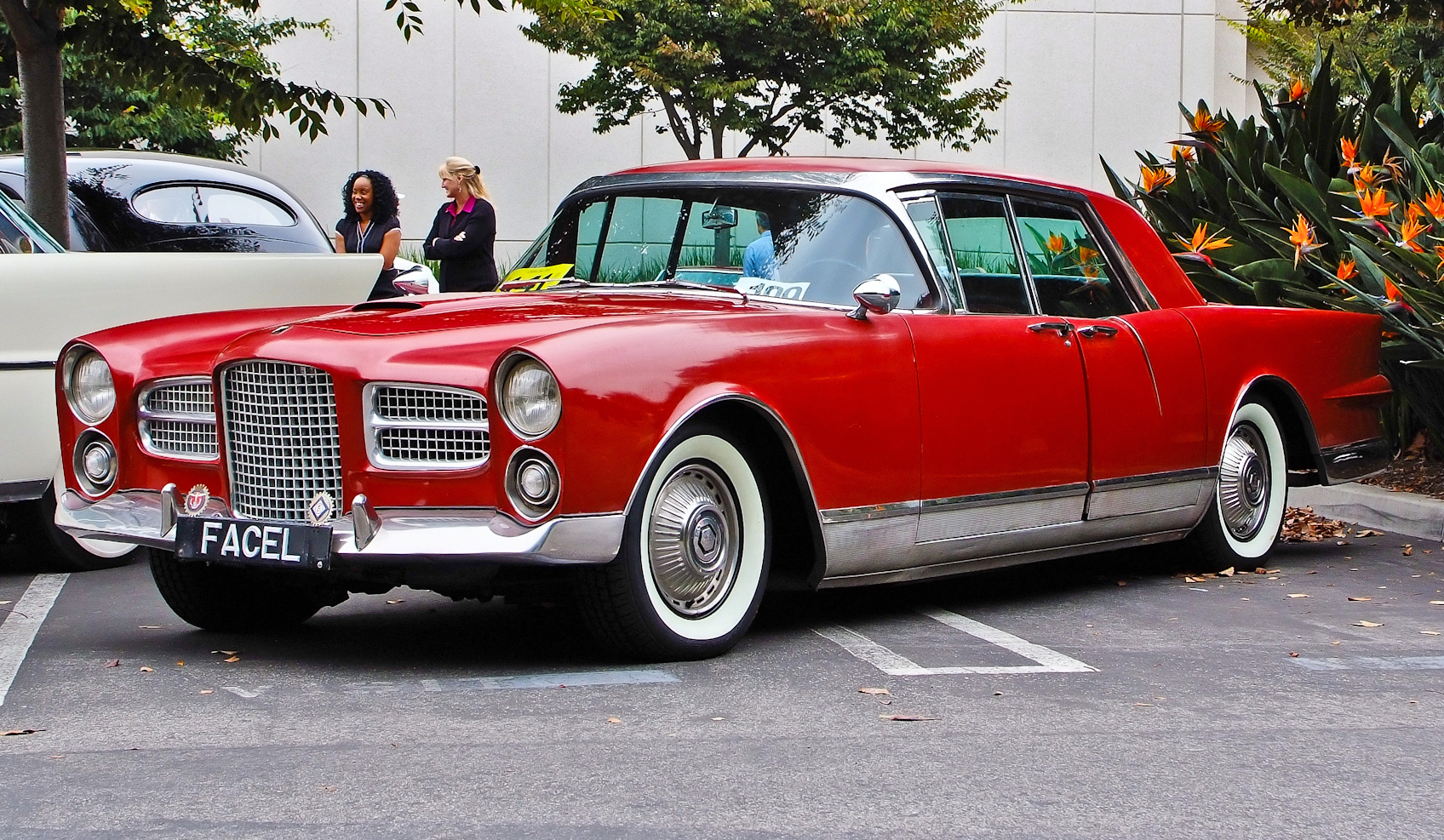

Overview
- Production: May 1958–October 1958
- Assembly: Paris, France

Body and chassis
- Body style: 4-door hardtop

Powertrain
- Engine: 6435 cc Chrysler 392 Hemi V8

While the Paris Show Car of 1956 was fitted with a 331 CID (5.4 litre) unit, the initial batch of production Excellences was equipped with the 392 CID (6.4 litre) version of the Chrysler Hemi V8. This engine, producing 360 hp (268 kW), was shared, among others, with the Facel Vega HK500 and Chrysler's own Imperial. Facels could either be ordered with the Pont-à-Mousson built four-speed manual, or the Chrysler built Torqueflite three-speed automatic. Contemporary road tests showed that they performed equally with either gearbox. Arguably the most powerful Excellences to ever hit the roads, these were genuine 140 mph cars. Reportedly, only eleven 'EX'-series cars were built, seven of which are known to have survived. The Hemi-engined Excellences can be recognized by their inclusion of a hood scoop not seen on later models.

== 1958–1961 (Model 'EX1') ==
Second generation
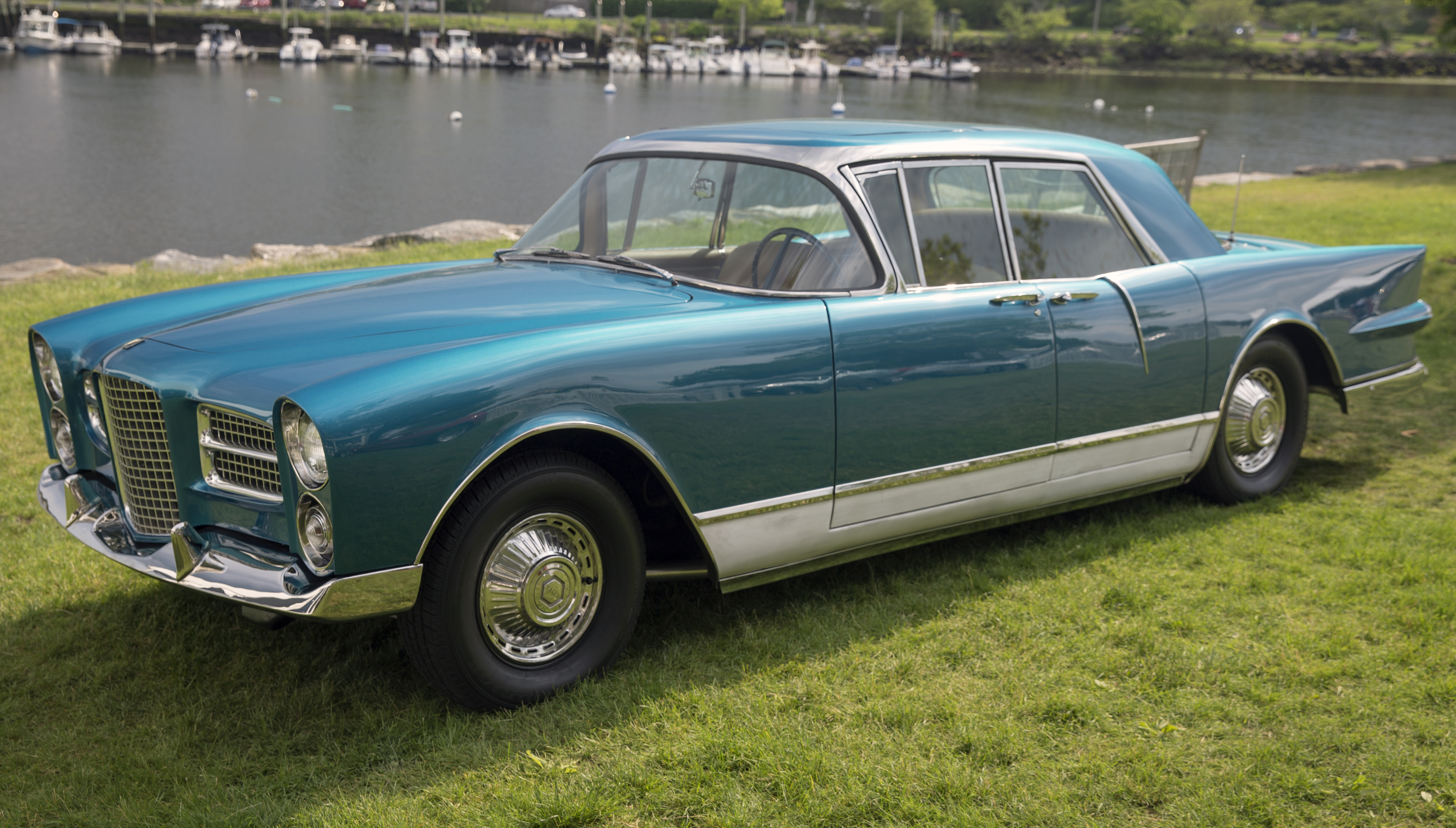

Overview
- Production: October 1958–July 1961
- Assembly: Paris, France

Powertrain
- Engine: 5913 cc Chrysler 361 B V8

For the 1958 model year, Chrysler discontinued the Hemi engines, and after stocks had dried up, Facel-Vega started using the 361 CID (5.9 litre) Chrysler 'Wedge' head V8 engines. Why Facel-Vega didn't opt for the top-of-the-line 413 CID (6.9 litre) engines instead remains unknown, but the elaborate French road tax system (Tax horsepower), which is based on engine displacement, is often cited as an explanation.

The 361-powered Excellence had the same nominal horsepower output of 360 hp (268 kW) as the Hemi it replaced. From late 1959 onwards, the Excellence was offered with optional power disc brakes up front.

The 1958 to 1961 Excellences were the most numerous of the bunch with 137 examples being built. Late models incorporate nearly all of the advancements generally considered to be part of the EX2 update, including the non-panoramic windshield, chassis and steering upgrades, as well as the lesser fins.

== 1961–1964 (Model 'EX2') ==
Third generation
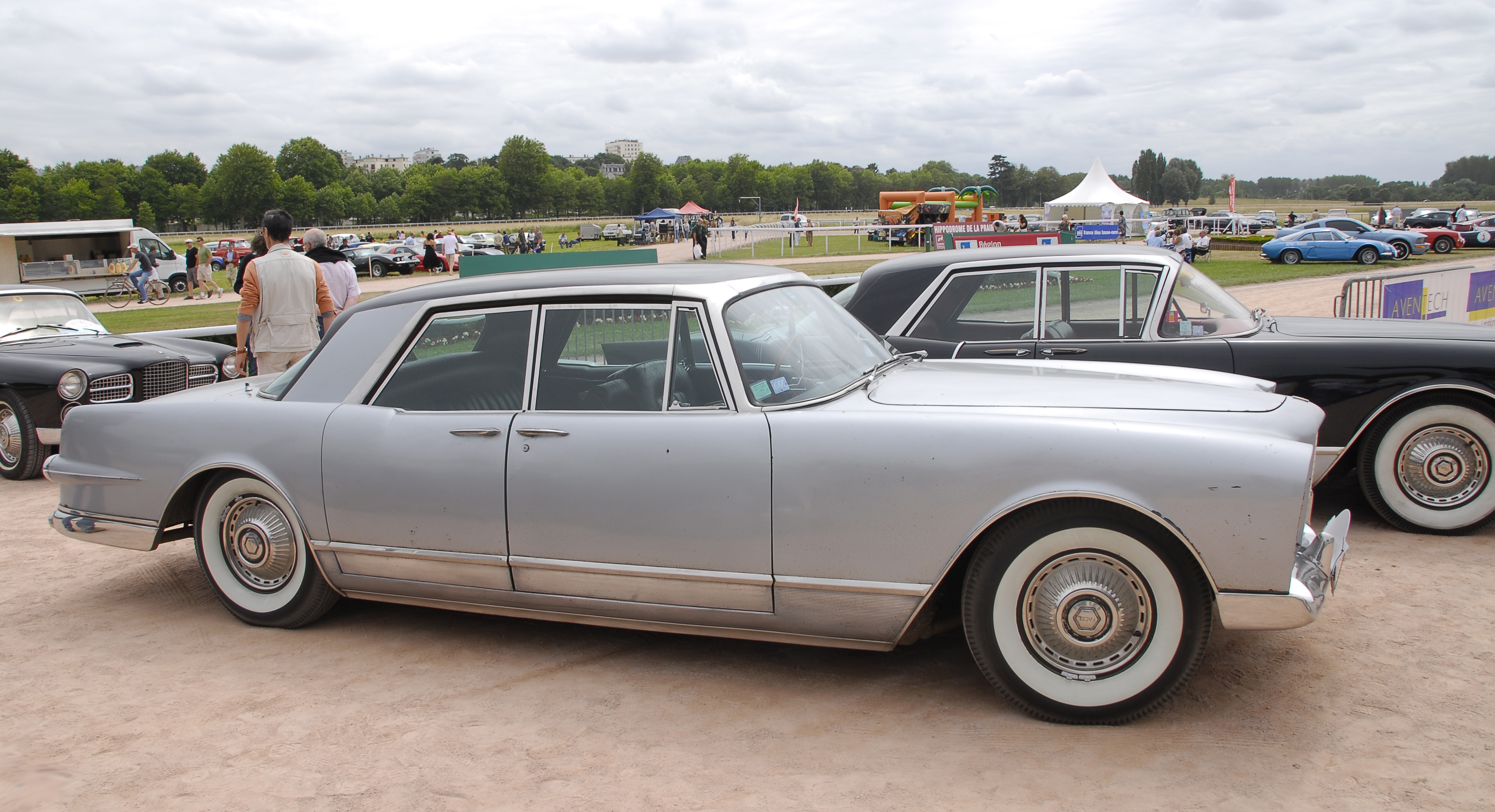

Overview
- Production: July 1961–June 1964
- Assembly: Paris, France

Powertrain
- Engine: 6277 cc Chrysler 383 B V8

The Excellence received its only significant facelift in 1961. It now came with a bigger 383 CID (6.3 litre) engine, rated at 390 hp (291 kW). However, no significant gain in performance could be noted in contemporary road tests, and the initial Hemi-powered cars remain the fastest Excellences ever built.

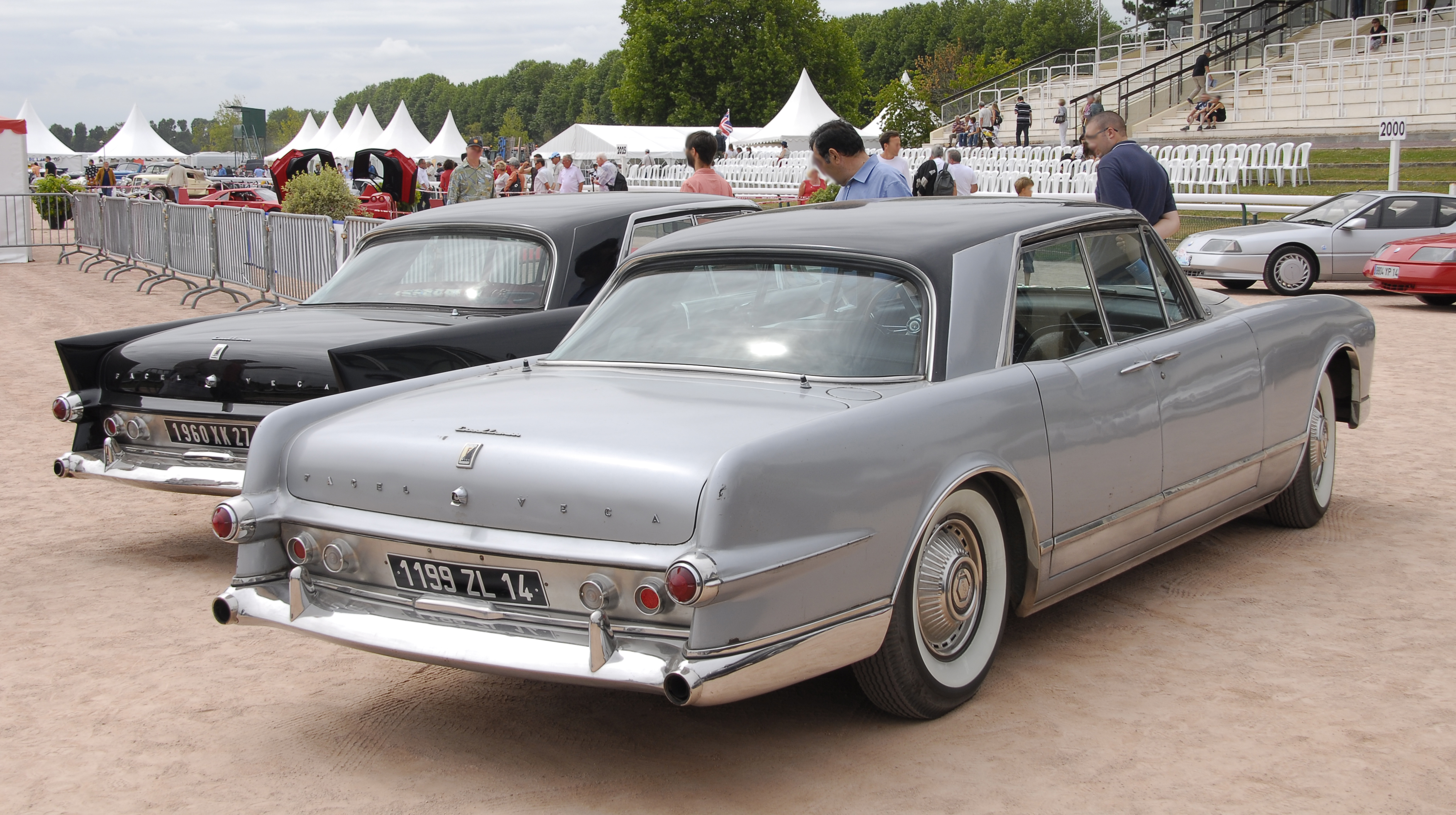
Rear view of restyled Excellence EX2, showing the more muted tailfin design.

The 'EX2' lost its wraparound windshield and the tailfins were downsized. The design did not, however, receive a full modernization as a complete re-styling of the car would have been prohibitively expensive, especially given its low production figures. The chassis was updated as well, incorporating advancements introduced on the HK500, which decreased chassis flex compared to earlier models. The door handles were also changed to better latching turn-down units.

The domestic market price quoted for the car at the EX2's first Paris Motor Show, in October 1961, was ₣72,500 new francs for an Excellence with an automatic transmission. The same money could at that time buy more than twelve Renault Dauphines. Of these "EX2" models, only eight were completed, when production ended.

== Discussions with Studebaker-Packard ==
Following the proposition of a New York based conglomerate wanting to revive the Packard brand in 1959, Facel-Vega boss Jean Daninos entered into negotiations with Studebaker-Packard Corporation president Harold Churchill. The idea was to badge-engineer the Excellence with Packard nameplates and the trademark Packard "Ox-Yoke" grille, using Packard's powerful and new for 1956 V8 engines, and market it through the more "exclusive" Studebaker-Packard dealers in North America. However, Daimler-Benz, which already had a marketing partnership with Studebaker-Packard, using Studebaker's dealership network to sell its Mercedes-Benz brand of cars in the United States, objected to the plan. Mercedes never got used to the idea of selling their brand next to a working man's car like a Studebaker, but also did not want floor competition for its luxury models. Churchill realized that he could never get the same cash stream from Facel-Vega that he did from Daimler-Benz, and the whole project was abandoned. The Facel-Vega Excellence-cum-Packard did make it to the planning stage, but contrary to popular belief, not a single actual prototype was built. However, a number of Excellences were imported to the US by private owners.
