= Facel Vega Facel II =

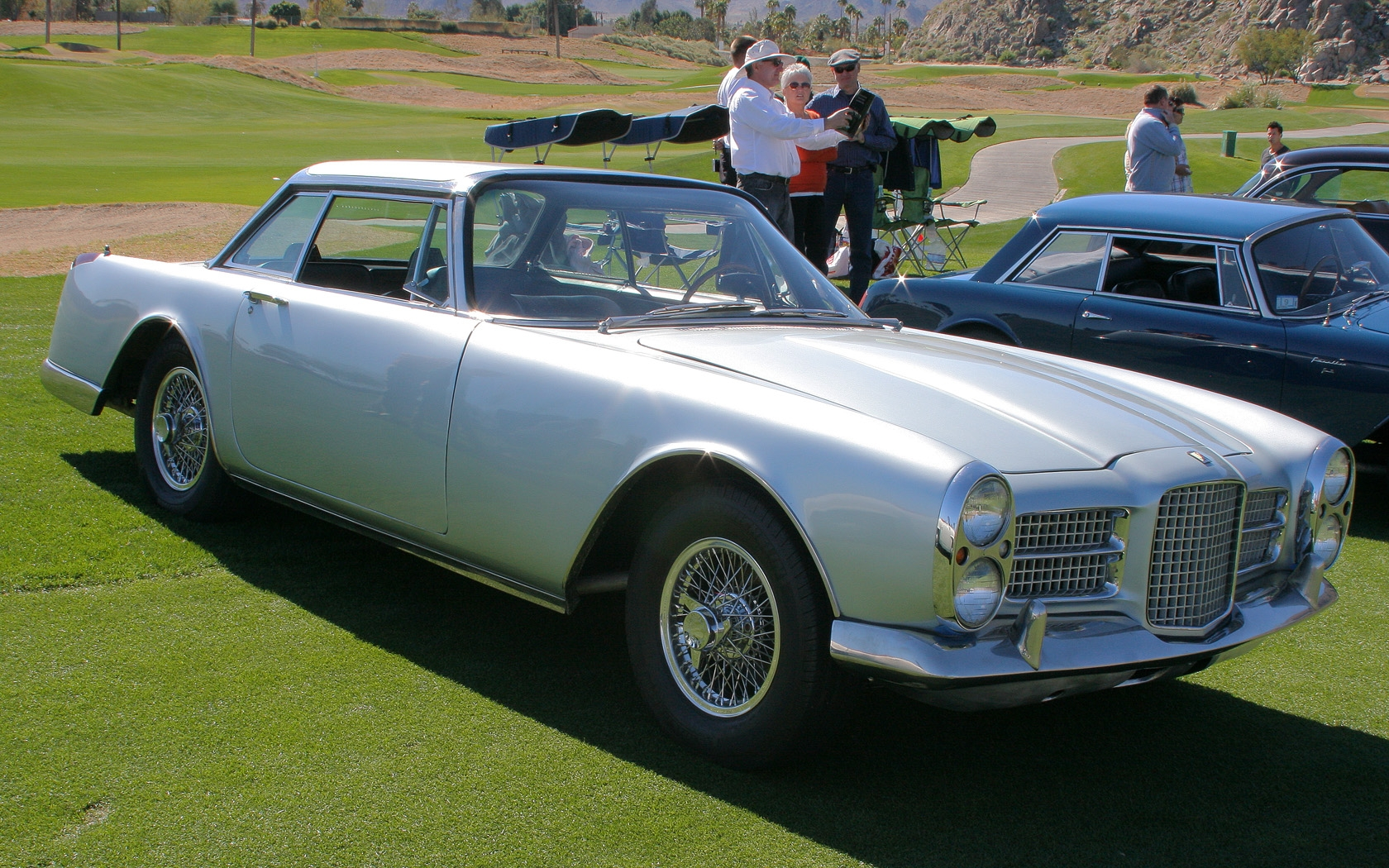

Overview
- Manufacturer: Facel Vega S.A. Paris
- Also called: Facel II
- Production: 1962–1964
- Assembly: Colombes, Paris, France
- Designer: Jean Daninos

Body and chassis
- Class: Grand tourer
- Body style: 2-door 4-seater coupe
- Layout: FR layout

Powertrain
- Engine: 6.3 L Chrysler V8; 6.7 L Chrysler V8
- Transmission: 3-speed Chrysler automatic 4-speed all-synchromesh Pont-a-Mousson manual (optional)

Dimensions
- Wheelbase: 2,660 mm (104.7 in)
- Length: 4,750 mm (187.0 in)
- Width: 1,760 mm (69.3 in)
- Height: 1,280 mm (50.4 in)
- Curb weight: 1,880 kg (4,145 lb)

Chronology
- Predecessor: Facel Vega HK500

The Facel Vega 'Facel II' is a grand touring car produced by French automaker Facel Vega between the years 1962 and 1964.

By 1962, the Paris-based company was facing bankruptcy. The Facel II was to be the company's last attempt to create a luxury GT car in the French tradition. Jean Daninos, president, said of the Facel II, "The HK500 was the most interesting car we ever made but the Facel II was by far the best. It was totally 'elegant' ."

The Facel S.A. company advertised the Facel II as "Le Coupé 4-places le plus rapide du Monde" ('The Fastest 4-seater Coupé in the World'). Sports Car Graphic described it as a "luxurious brute". Bernard Cahier, a race-driver who tested the car in 1962, said of an early version (without the later limited-slip differential) that "the huge output of the Chrysler engine made it easy to spin wheels at light throttle pressure".

== Features ==
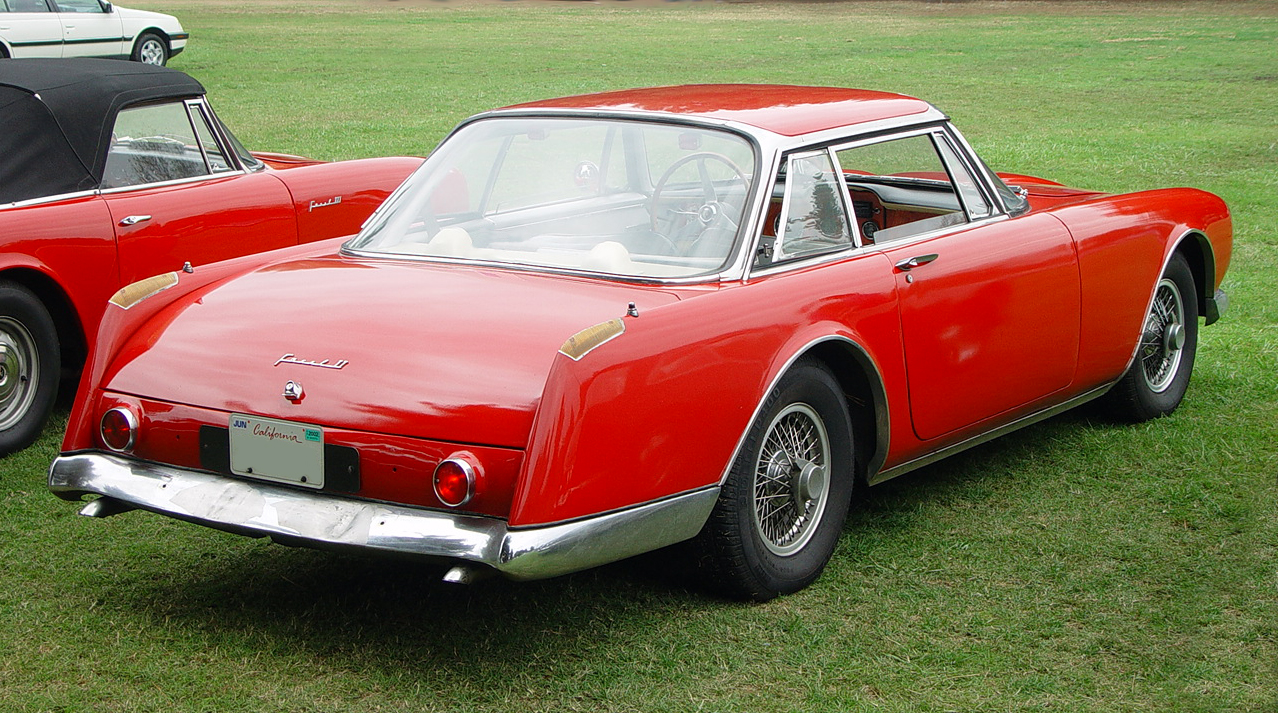
Rear view, showing the subtle tailfins

The Facel II was introduced at the 1961 Paris Motor Show, and was powered by a Chrysler 6.3 litre (383 cu.in.) 'Typhoon' engine which produced 265 kW (355 hp) if equipped with a TorqueFlite automatic-gearbox, or 290 kW (390 hp) with a manual transmission. Using Chrysler's three-speed automatic gearbox, the 6.3-litre Facel II could reach a top speed of over 217 km/h (135 mph). With a French Pont-a-Mousson four-speed manual gearbox the full-four-seater 6.3 litre Facel II could reach over 240 km/h (150 mph) and out-accelerate two-seat GTs such as the Aston Martin DB4, Ferrari 250 GT and 'gull-wing' Mercedes-Benz 300SL, to 97 km/h (60 mph) and all except the Ferrari to 160 km/h (100 mph). Dunlop disc brakes were fitted on all four wheels and Hydrosteer power steering, leather seats, electric windows and radio aerial all became standard during the production run, with Armstrong Selecta-Ride shock-absorbers adjustable from the dash while driving fitted to the right-hand-drive British models. The curvaceous wrap-round dash was in fact metal but meticulously painted to look like wood. Many of the controls were airplane inspired. The later models were fitted with the even more powerful 6.7 litre (413 cu.in.) Chrysler RB "wedge" engine and were faster still.

Like its predecessor, the Facel Vega HK500, the Facel II was a heavy vehicle, weighing 1,880 kg (4,145 lb) (37 cwt) 'dry' and well over two tons with four passengers and a full petrol tank. There may have been some question about its ride and rear suspension – it used suspension virtually unchanged from the previous HK500 – but certainly none about its speed or glamour.

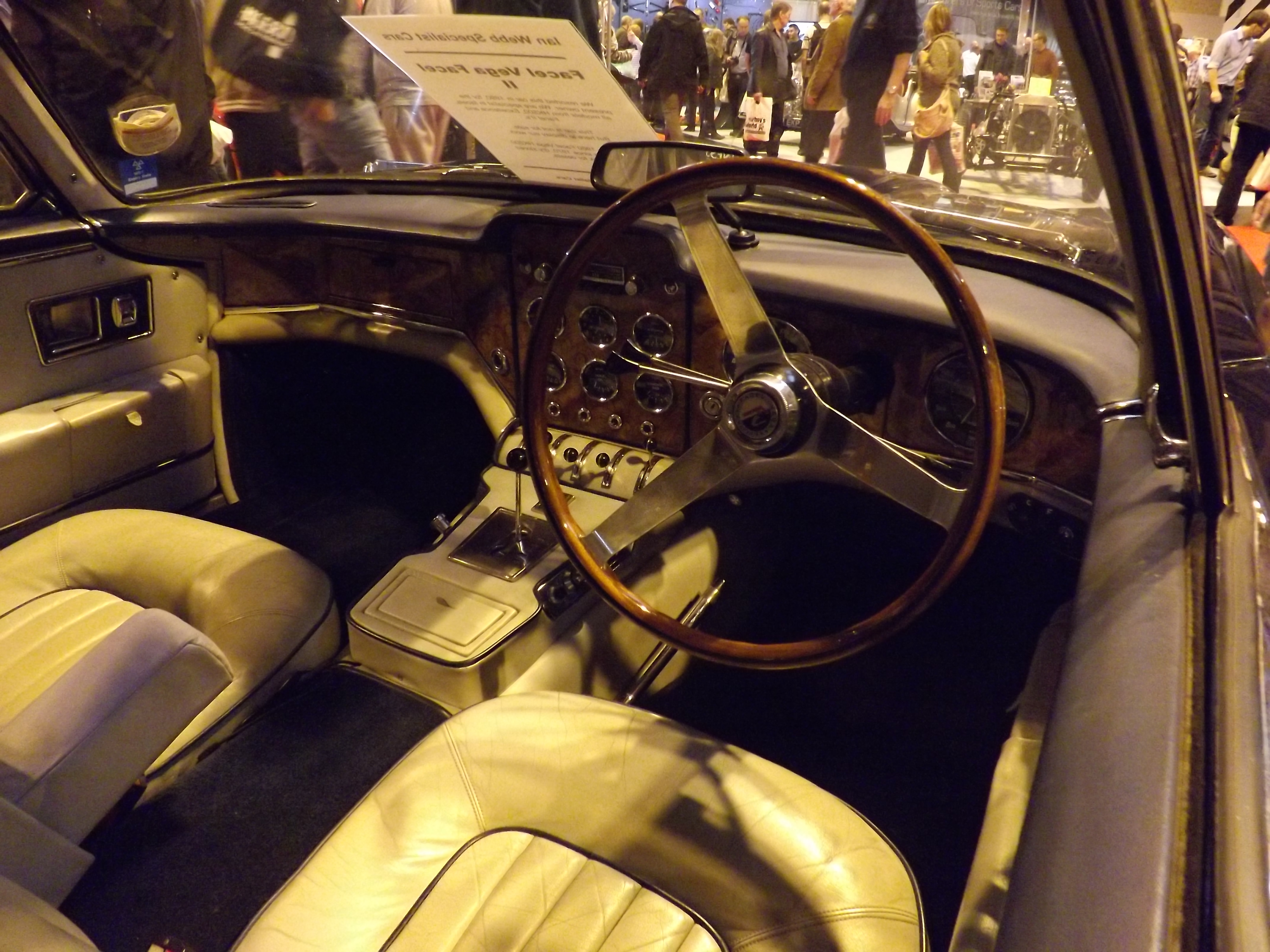
Interior

== Contemporary reviews ==
England's Autocar said of it:

To step down into a Facel II and go motoring must be the ambition of many who can never fulfil it. Such an experience is reserved for the few who can afford to buy one and for their friends and acquaintances.

Said Motor:

There are faster sports cars, although very few, and there are more refined and luxurious saloons, but it is difficult to think of a more remarkable combination of these rather conflicting qualities. ... its unique combination of qualities left the most vivid impression on everyone who drove it. In particular one remembers the smoothness and silence, the effortless gait of a car which does 100 mph (160 km/h) at only 3,650 rpm. and the acceleration which leaves other fast cars far behind on every straight. One can enjoy the latest refinements of American brute force with European standards of control in an environment of British luxury and French elegance.

== Demise ==
In August 1961 Jean Daninos was obliged to offer his resignation and in 1964 the Facel company went into receivership, largely due to warranty claims against Facel Vega's smaller Facellia with its troublesome 'in-house' engine. As a result, Facel II production had to be discontinued with only 180 Facel IIs built.

== Collectibility ==
Regarded by some today as one of the more handsome automobiles ever made, the remaining Facel IIs are now amongst the most sought-after of all 1960s Grand Tourers. On 1 December 2013 Bonhams in London auctioned the partially restored right-hand-drive Facel II formerly owned by Ringo Starr for £337,500 [= approx €407,000/$552,500 at the time]. On 6 February 2014 Bonhams in Paris auctioned a rusty and derelict 'barn-find' left-hand-drive Facel II in need of a total-rebuild restoration for €155,250 [= approx £129,000/$211,000 at the time]. On 27 June 2014 Bonhams in London auctioned a right-hand-drive 2-owner 'garage-find' non-runner in need of total-rebuild restoration for £122,460 [= approx €154,000/$210,000 at the time]. On 9 September 2017 Bonhams in London auctioned a restored right-hand drive Facel II for £315,100 [= approx €359,000/$428,000 at the time].
