= Facel Vega FV =

Facel Vega FV/FVS/HK500
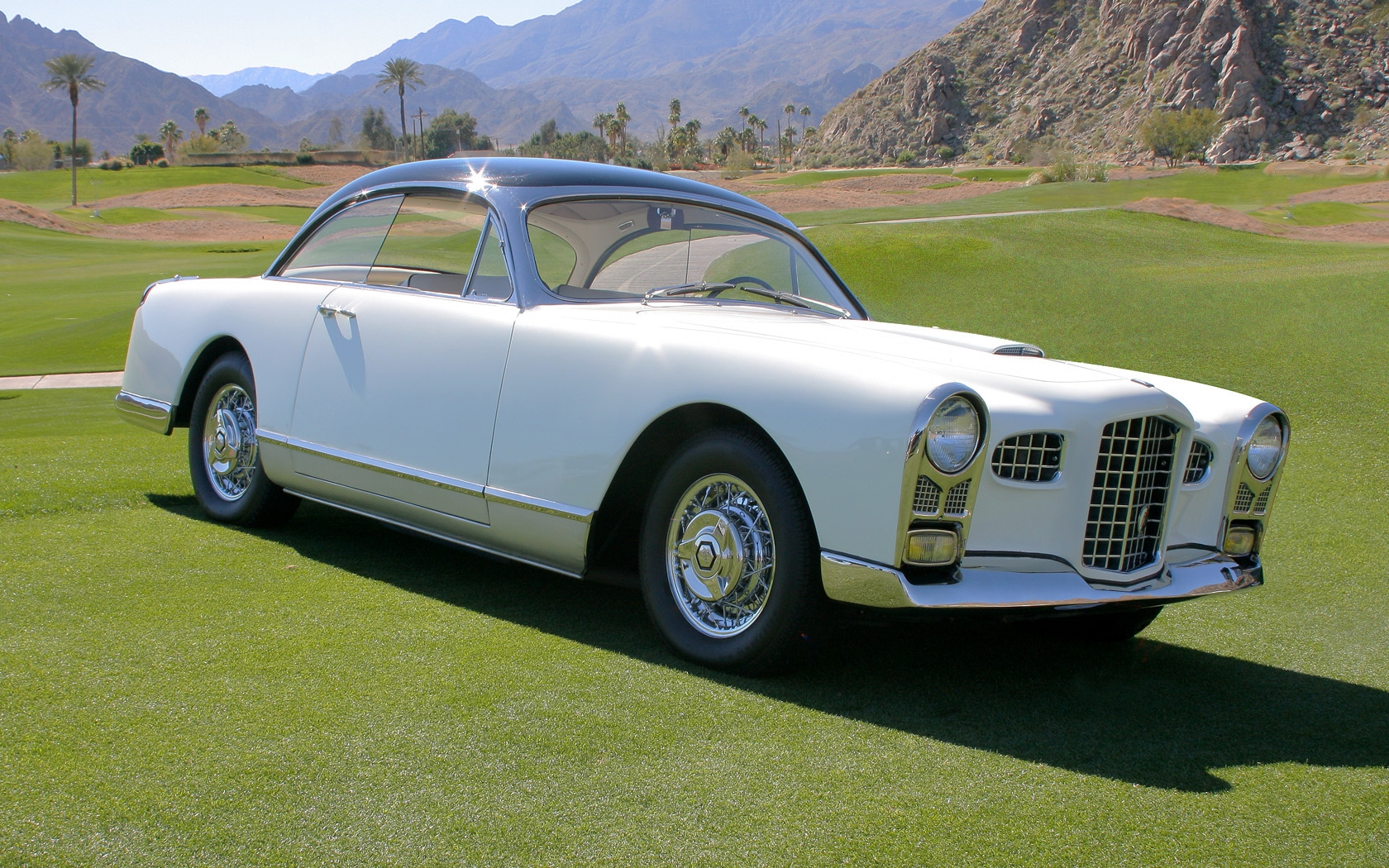
- 1955 Facel Vega FV1

Overview
- Manufacturer: Facel
- Also called: Facel Vega HK500 (1959–1962)
- Production: 1954–1962
- Assembly: Colombes, Paris, France
- Designer: Jean Daninos

Body and chassis
- Class: grand tourer
- Body style: 2-door coupé 2-door convertible
- Layout: Front engine, rear wheel drive

Powertrain
- Engine: 4,525 cc Plymouth Poly V8; 4,528 cc DeSoto Fire Dome V8; 4,768 cc DeSoto Fire Dome V8; 4,910 cc Plymouth Poly V8; 5,407 cc DeSoto Fire Dome V8; 5,801 cc Chrysler Hemi V8; 6,279 cc Chrysler Typhoon V8
- Transmission: 2- or 3-speed automatic; 4-speed manual

Chronology
- Successor: Facel Vega II

The Facel Vega FV/FVS is a car produced by French automaker Facel from 1954 until 1959. It continued to be built until 1962 as the HK500.

== History ==
=== FV ===
The Facel "Vega" was launched at the 1954 Paris Salon, although the first prototype had been completed in October 1953. Originally the model name was "Vega", but they gradually became "Facel Vega" with "FV" followed by a number indicating the iteration. By 1956, the cars were called FVS (for Facel Vega Sport) in the United States. The 1954 versions of the Facel were fitted with a DeSoto Firedome (Chrysler) 4.5 litre Hemi V8 engine, paired with either Chrysler's two-speed Powerflite automatic transmission or, at extra cost, a four-speed manual made by Pont-à-Mousson. At this stage, the 180 hp (132 kW) FV was capable of a top speed from 172 to 193 km/h (107 to 120 mph), depending on which rear axle ratio was installed. The chassis, designed by Lance Macklin, was tubular framed, featuring coil springs and double wishbones at the front, with a leaf-sprung live rear axle. The styling, by Daninos himself, was somewhat American and perhaps a bit heavy, with rudimentary tail fins. The body was an expanded version of the earlier, Facel-bodied Simca/Ford Comète. An abundance of stainless steel brightwork was fitted.

The dashboard was aircraft-inspired, and one of the first to feature a middle console over the gearbox. On FV and FV1 models, the dashboard was entirely upholstered in leather. The rear seats folded flat to provide a luggage platform and additional access to the boot. In 1955 the engine capacity increased to 4.8 litres and 200 hp (147 kW) (FV1). The FV1 was also 12 cm (4.7 in) longer than the original design47 of these early FVs were built in 1954 and 1955. Seven were convertibles, but as these suffered from rigidity troubles all but a handful of the rest of the large two-door Facels were pillarless coupés.

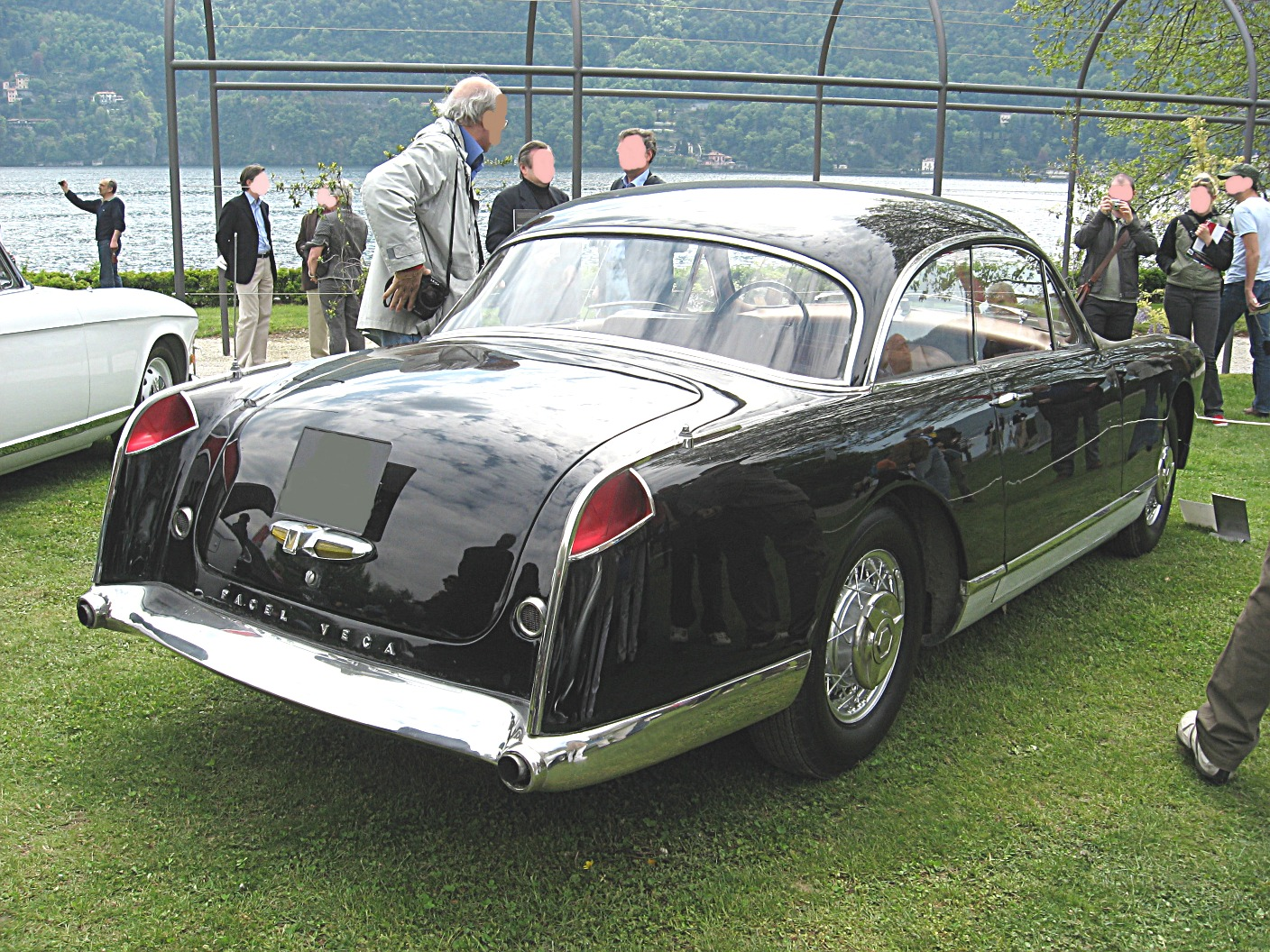
Rear view of early FV

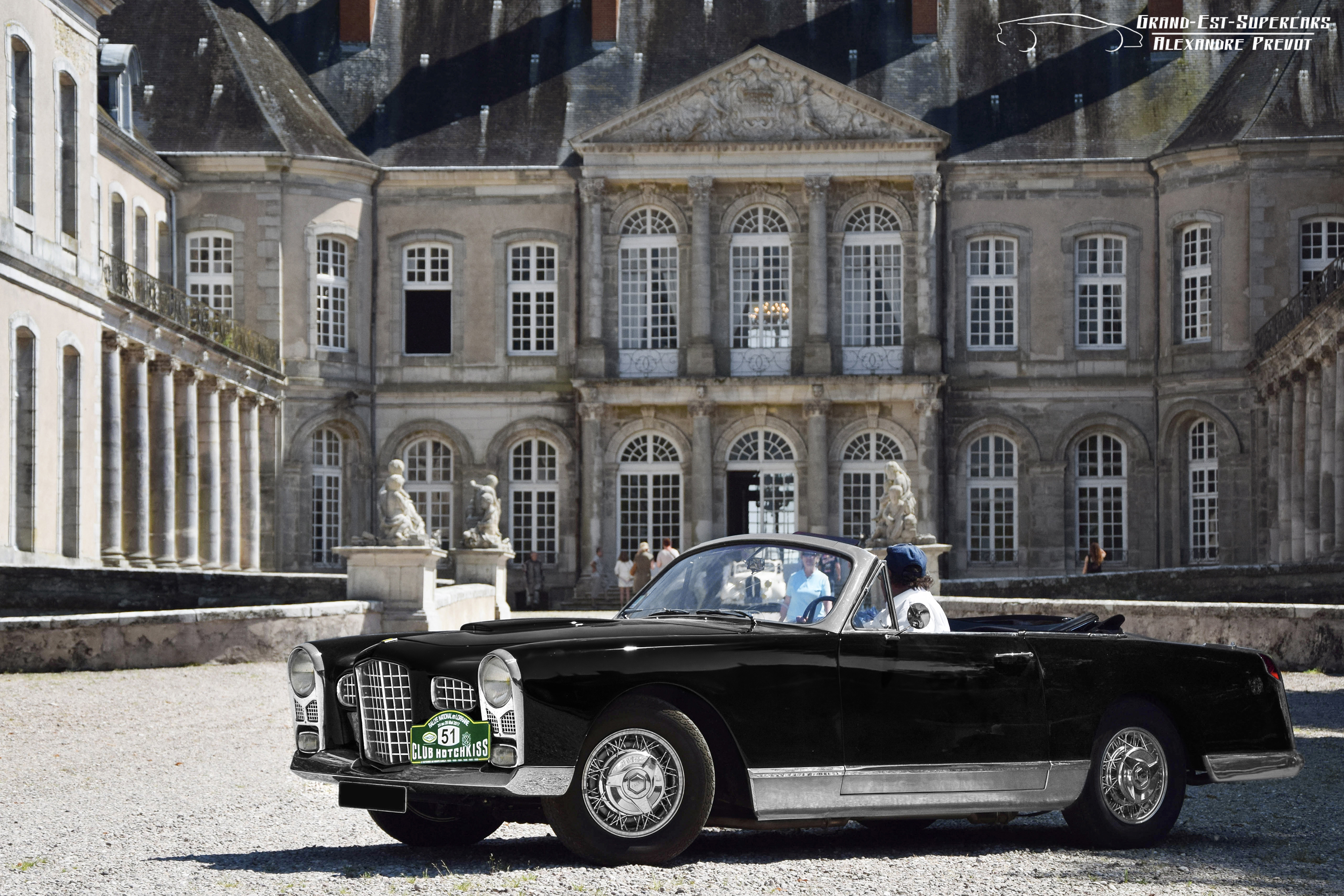
FV1 Cabriolet

=== FVS ===
Introduced in October 1955, the FV2 featured a panoramic (also known as a "wrap-around") windshield. The trompe-l'œil dashboard was metal, hand painted to look like burled wood by Marcel Bigot, the head of Facel's paint department. Referred to as the FVS in the United States, the car featured the same 4.8-litre engine as in the FV1, albeit now offering 250 hp (184 kW). During 1956, the 5.4-litre FV2B appeared, with 285 hp (210 kW) and substantial added torque. One single FV2 convertible was built and exhibited at the company's stand at the 1955 Paris Salon, while two FV2B convertibles were built in 1956 for customers in the United States. One FV3 convertible was also finished, in spite of Daninos' reluctance to offer the bodystyle due to its lack of rigidity.

The FVS was also offered with a three-speed automatic, and front disc brakes were available from 1958. At some point a reworked, more harmonious front end was introduced for the FV3 model, featuring what looked like twin stacked headlights but what were actually headlamps on top and auxiliaries beneath. Plymouth's Polyspheric 4.5-litre "277 Power Pack" engine replaced the DeSoto Hemi unit; maximum power was down to 200 hp (147 kW). Power steering and power brakes were both standard as of 1957. As Plymouth replaced the 277 engine with the bigger-bore 301 for the 1957 model year, Facel did the same and called the resulting model the FV3B. In addition to the new 253 hp (186 kW) engine, the FV3B also received new, slightly longer and wider bodywork on cars built after the first batch of twelve cars had been completed in March 1957. For 1958, the engine grew to 5.8 litres (FV4) and 325 hp (239 kW), although the earlier 4.5 and a 4.9 (FV3/FV3B) were still listed as available and the three models were built alongside each other. In total, 357 FVs and FVSs were built.

A four-door version, called the Excellence, was added to the lineup in 1958, but was even more rarefied than the two-door version.

French publisher Michel Gallimard was driving his FV2 on January 4, 1960, when he lost control and crashed outside of Villeblevin. The crash killed him and one of his passengers, Nobel laureate Albert Camus. Some have speculated that the driver was not familiar with the car's handling and weight, and that contributed to the severity of the crash.

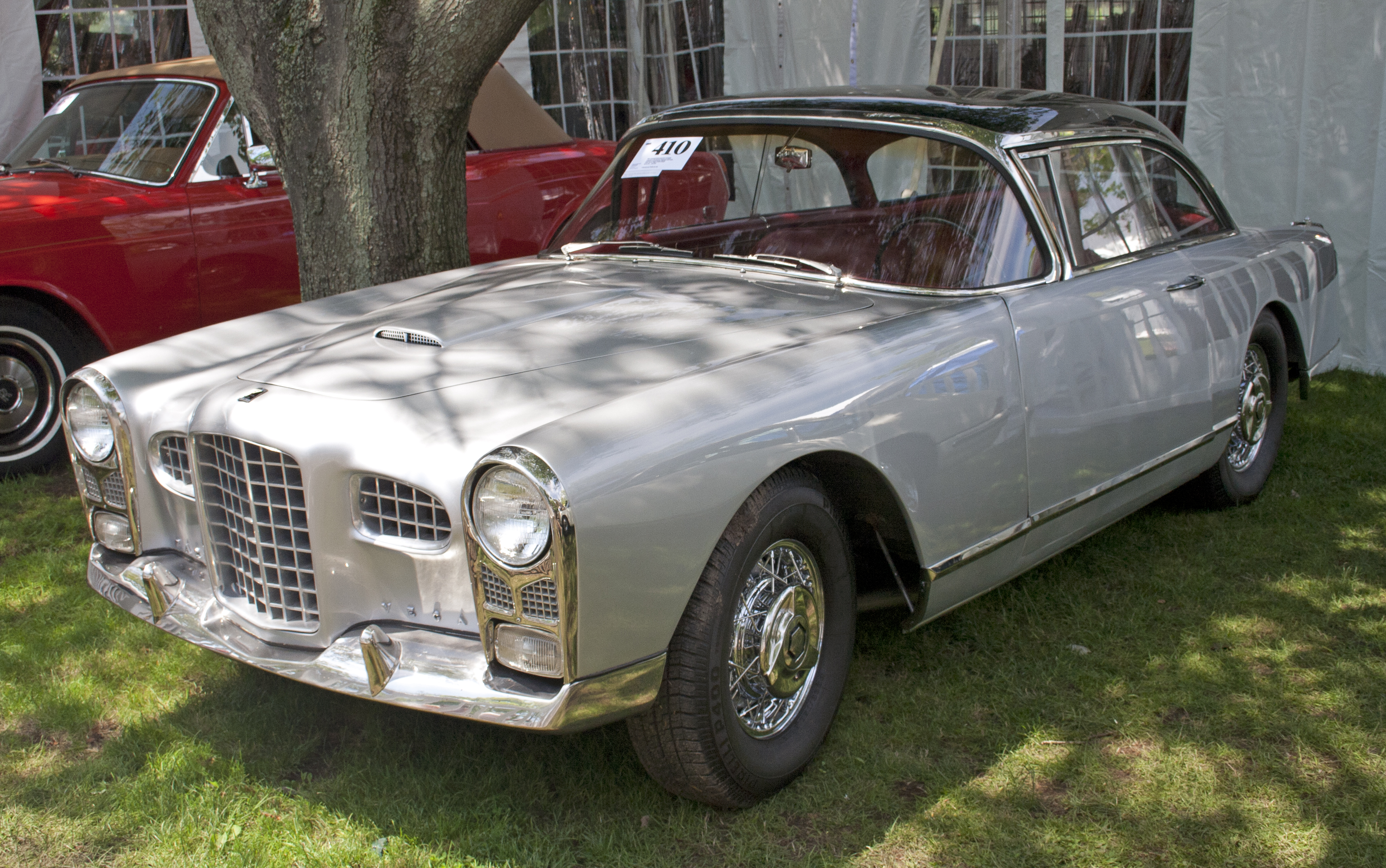
Early Facel Vega FVS (1956 FV2B), combining the first front design with panoramic windshield

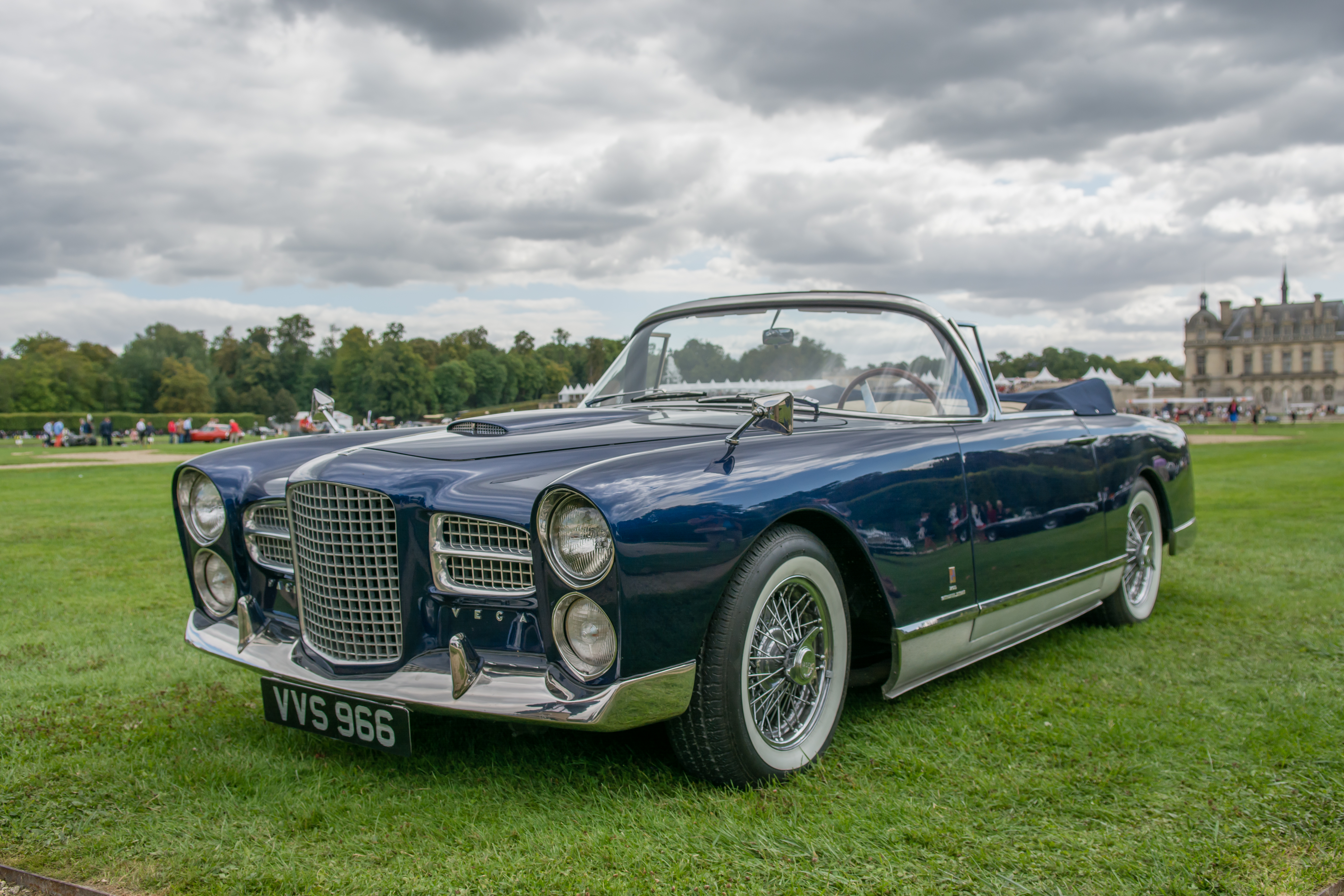
One of the two Facel Vega FV2B Cabriolet (wearing an FV3 front), chassis no. 57097 (originally 56097).

=== HK500 ===
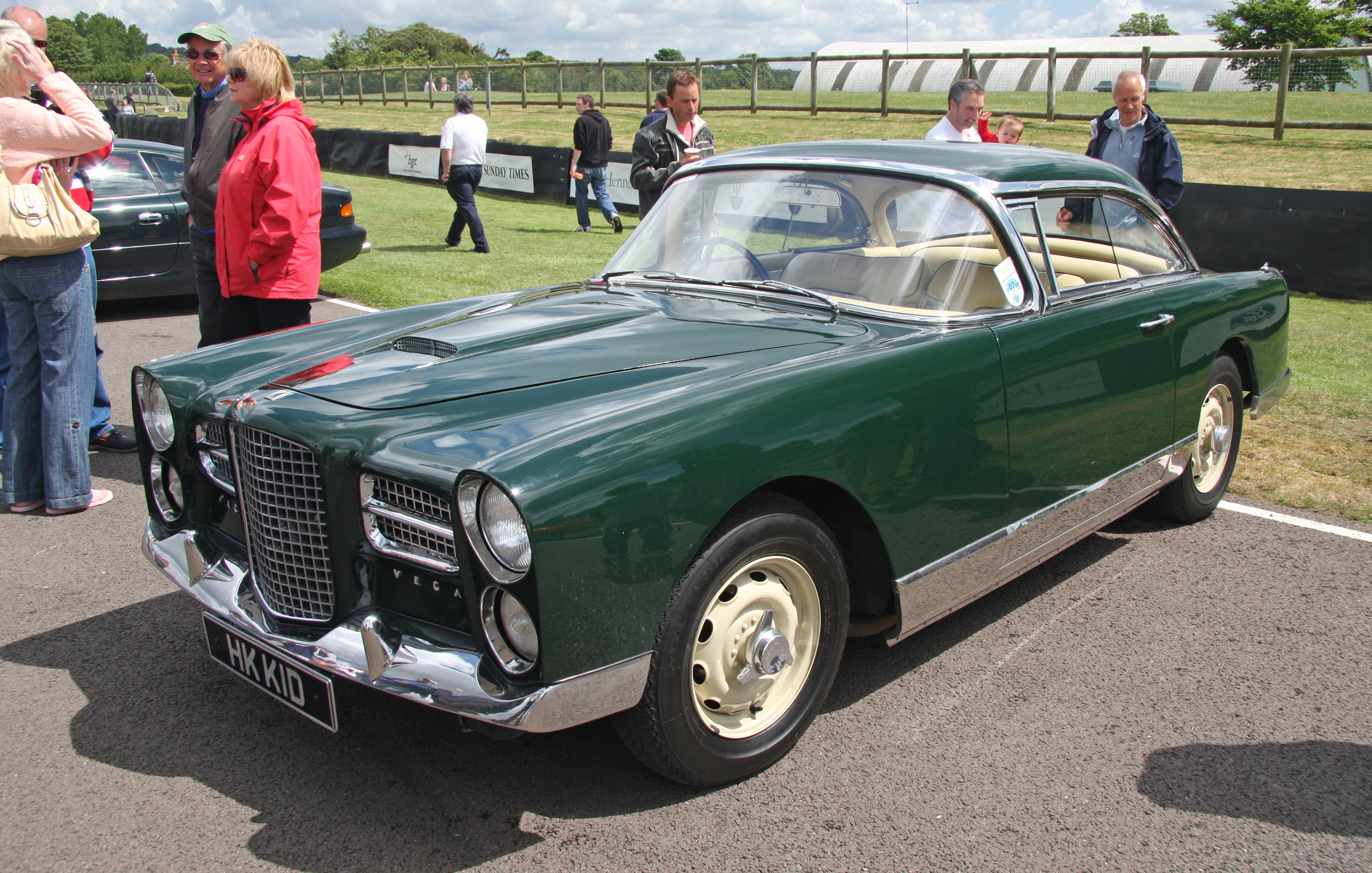
Facel Vega HK500

For 1959, the Facel Vega HK500 was introduced. Essentially, it was just a renamed, upgraded FVS. Equipped at first with the 335 hp (246 kW) 5.8-litre V8 from the FVS, the HK500 soon received a 360 hp (265 kW) 6.3 litre Chrysler V8, giving it a top speed of 147 mph (237 km/h). It could accelerate from 0-60 mph (97 km/h) in 8.5 seconds. Initially, disc brakes were optional, becoming standard in April, 1960. The Facel Vega II replaced the HK500 in 1962, after 489 had been built. One was a specially made convertible. Total FV/HK production was 842, or 846 depending on the source.

Production
1954-1955	47 (FV)
1955-1956	107 (FVS)
1957	118 (FVS)
1958	85 (FVS); 71 (HK500)
1959	190 (HK500)
1960	202 (HK500)
1961	66 (split between HK500 and Facel II)

== Incidental facts ==
Albert Camus died when the Facel Vega FV2 he was travelling in hit a tree.
