= Pierre Daninos =

French writer and humorist (1913–2005)

- Born: 26 May 1913; Paris, France
- Died: 7 January 2005 (aged 91); Paris, France
- Occupations: Writer, humorist, novelist
- Writing career
- Language: French
- Genres: Fiction, humor

Pierre Daninos (26 May 1913 – 7 January 2005) was a French writer and humorist.

== Life ==
Daninos was born in Paris. He wrote Les carnets du Major Thompson, which was published in 1954, and was followed by many sequels. The books in the series pretended to be the observations of a retired British officer living in France, and were witty collections of comparisons between French and British society. Daninos was also the author of Un Certain Monsieur Blot, a critique of French middle class taste and habits.

Some of these books were translated into English and published as Major Thompson Lives in France and Discovers the French, Major Thompson and I and Major Thompson Goes French.

Les carnets du Major Thompson was filmed by Preston Sturges in 1955. The film was released in the U.S. under the title The French, They Are a Funny Race.

These works were not praised by everyone. The Guardian's obituary considered that this sort of thing had been done before and sometimes done better, and that Daninos had uncritically repeated instead of critically examining national stereotypes.

Daninos was the brother of the industrialist Jean Daninos, who produced the Facel Vega luxury cars.

He died in Paris, aged 91.

== See also ==
A Year in the Merde
