= The French, They Are a Funny Race =

1955 film by Preston Sturges

- Theatrical release poster
- French: Les Carnets du Major Thompson
- Directed by: Preston Sturges
- Screenplay by: Preston Sturges
- Based on: Les Carnets du Major Thompson by Pierre Daninos
- Produced by: Alain Poiré; Paul Wagner
- Starring: Martine Carol; Jack Buchanan; André Luguet; Noël-Noël
- Cinematography: Maurice Barry; Jean Lallier; Christian Matras
- Edited by: Raymond Lamy
- Music by: Georges Van Parys
- Distributed by: Gaumont Distribution
- Release date: 9 December 1955 (France)
- Running time: 105 minutes
- Country: France
- Languages: English; French
- Budget: $540,000

The French, They Are a Funny Race (French: Les Carnets du Major Thompson, lit. 'The Notebooks of Major Thompson'; released in the United Kingdom as The Diary of Major Thompson) is a 1955 French comedy film written and directed by Preston Sturges, based on the 1954 novel Les Carnets du Major Thompson by Pierre Daninos, and starring Martine Carol and Jack Buchanan.

This was the last film directed by Sturges before his death in August 1959, as well as the final film appearance of Buchanan, who died in October 1957.

== Plot ==
Major Thompson is a crusty, middle-aged English officer, retired and widowed and living in Paris, who tries to adjust to the French way of life. He falls in love with frivolous but alluring Martine, and then marries her. The question is, will their child be raised as a proper Englishman, or a swinging Frenchman?

== Cast ==
- Jack Buchanan as Maj. Thompson
- Martine Carol as Martine
- Noël-Noël as M. Taupin
- Totti Truman Taylor as Miss Fyfyth, the nurse
- Catherine Boyl as Ursula
- André Luguet as M. Fusillard, the editor
- Geneviève Brunet as Secretary
- Paulette Dubost as M^{me} Taupin

== Production ==
The film was based on a popular column by Pierre Daninos in Le Figaro. Daninos would write as fictitious English Major Marmaduke Thompson who would observe the French. Daninos then turned these columns into a book The Notebooks of Major Thompson.

Preston Sturges had come to Paris in hopes of reviving his career, which had hit the skids in Hollywood after his partnership with Howard Hughes dissolved in acrimony. He did some work on Broadway, wrote the screenplay for an adaptation of George Bernard Shaw's The Millionairess which Katharine Hepburn, who had performed in the play in New York, wanted to get produced, and then came to France where, because he was fluent in French, he was able to write and direct the screenplay for this adaptation of Pierre Daninos popular novel.

Sturges originally wrote a script called Forty Million Frenchmen, about a French author who invents an English character who assumes a borrowed identity. However, Daninos published his novel with such success that Sturges was requested to write a version closer to that. The movie was shot both in French and English using two crews.

== Release and reception ==
The film was released in France on 9 December 1955, but Sturges did some additional polishing of it for the American audience, and it was not released in the United States until 20 May 1957, when it premiered in New York City, the final American opening of Sturges' film career.

The movie was the 9th most popular film in France in 1956 but was not a hit in the US.
