= Jean Daninos =

Jean Daninos (2 December 1906 – 13 October 2001) was a Greek-French constructor of luxury cars Facel Vega, born in Paris.

The brother of the Pierre Daninos, Jean Daninos had founded the company FACEL (Forges et Ateliers des Constructions d'Eure-et-Loir, forge and construction workshop for the department of Eure-et-Loir) in 1939 with hopes of one day designing and manufacturing his own automobile. An engineer, he had previously collaborated with Citroën on the Traction Avant and had worked in the aviation field.

The FACEL company produced the bodies of custom cars like the Panhard Dyna cabriolet and the Ford Comète. He had also a long time business partnership with Henri Théodore Pigozzi CEO of Simca. All the stylish Aronde sports derivatives (coupes and convertibles called PLein Ciel and Océane, targeted for well to do women customers ) were manufactured by Facel. However Pigozzi and Simca chose cheaper and more trendy Carrozzeria Bertone for the later the Simca 1000 derivatives (Simca 1200S) and ended the Simca partnership. The first Facel Vega model, designed by Daninos himself, debuted in 1954, equipped with a Chrysler engine. Daninos counted among his clients celebrities including (Tony Curtis, Ava Gardner) and racing drivers (Stirling Moss, Maurice Trintignant). Several sports car models followed until the company's demise in the mid-1960s. During ten years of production, FACEL had manufactured 3,000 automobiles.

Daninos died in Cannes at age 94 from cancer. He was buried with his relatives in Jouy-en-Josas.
