= Bristol 410 =

Overview
- Manufacturer: Bristol Cars
- Production: 1968–1969; 82 units
- Assembly: United Kingdom: Filton

Body and chassis
- Class: Sports saloon
- Layout: FR layout

Powertrain
- Engine: 5,211 cm^{3} (318 cu in) Chrysler A V8
- Transmission: 3-speed automatic

Chronology
- Predecessor: Bristol 409
- Successor: Bristol 411

The Bristol 410 was the fourth series of Chrysler V8-engined models from British manufacturer Bristol Cars. It was the last Bristol to use the 5.2-litre (318 cubic-inch) engine originally found in the Bristol 407.

With the 410, Bristol aimed for a more aerodynamic approach than that found on their previous five series dating back to the 405. The styling improvements were relatively minor but every one of them was aimed to make for a more curved appearance. The most noteworthy change was that the headlamps were fully faired into the wings of the car rather than protruding outwards as on previous models.

As in every Bristol saloon since the 404, a compartment accessed via a hinged panel between the front of the driver's door and the rear of the front wheel arch housed the battery, fuse panel, windscreen wiper motor and brake servos. A similar panel on the other side of the car housed the spare wheel and jack.

There were also 15 inch wheels as against the 16 inch size found on previous Bristols, and the disc braking system dating back to the 406 was revised for the first time since then, with a greatly updated system of braking circuits being introduced.

Internally, Bristol, like Chrysler before them, by then had felt that the safety problems of push-button automatic transmission were too difficult to counter and thus they shifted to a more conventional lever mounted between the two front seats.
