= Bristol Bullet (automobile) =

Sports car

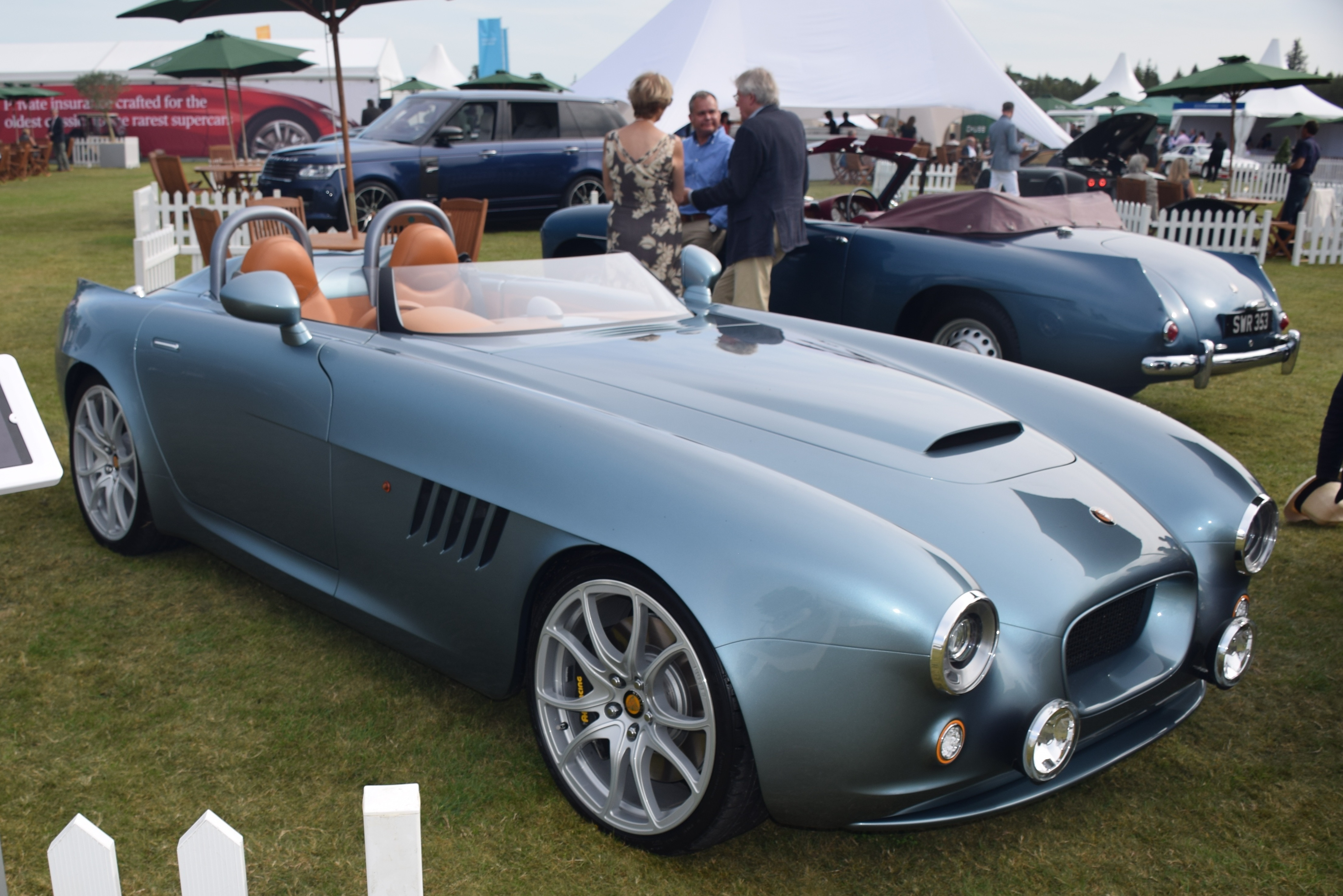
A Bristol Bullet and a Bristol 405 Drophead coupé on display at Salon Privé.

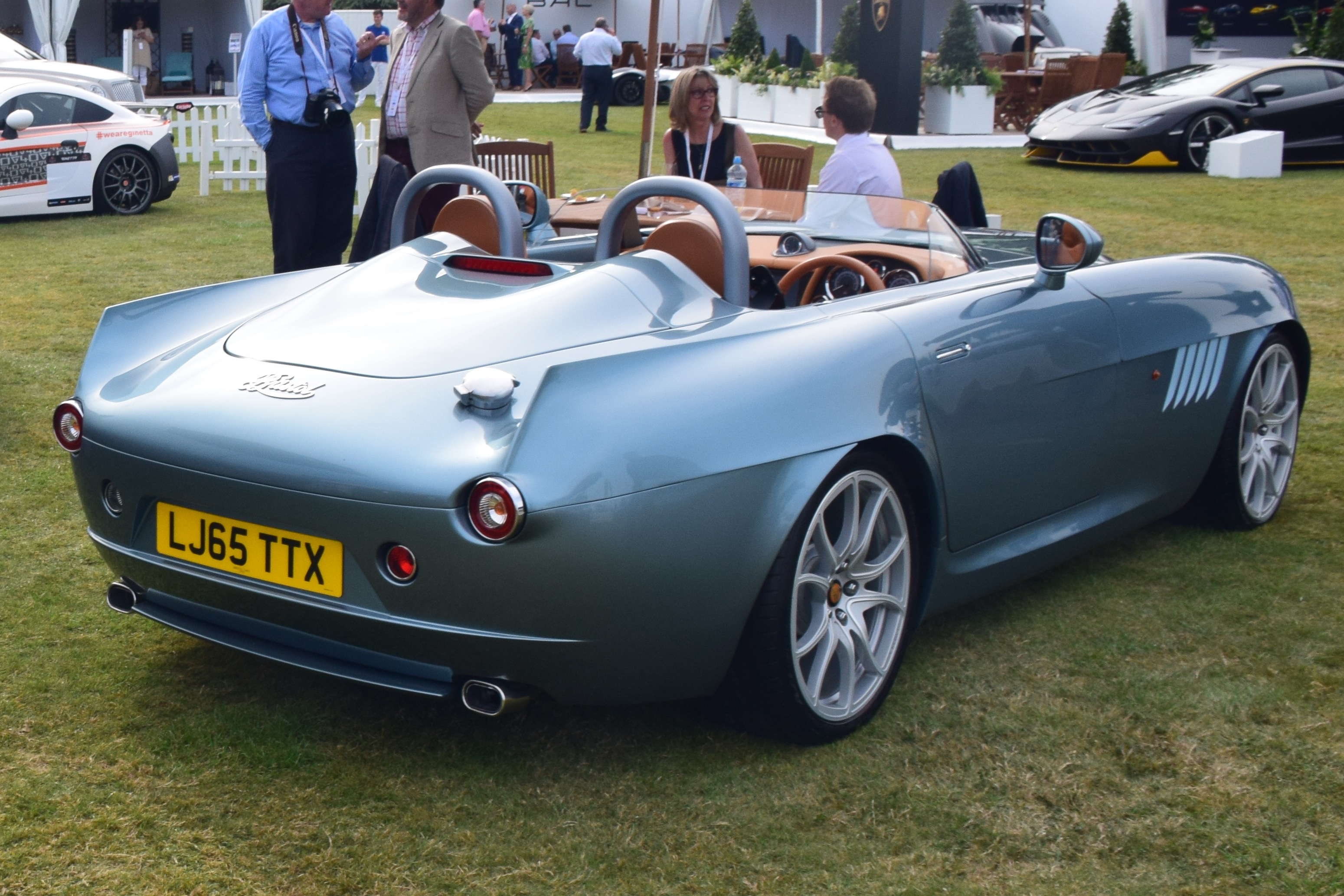
Rear view of the Bristol Bullet on display at Salon Privé.

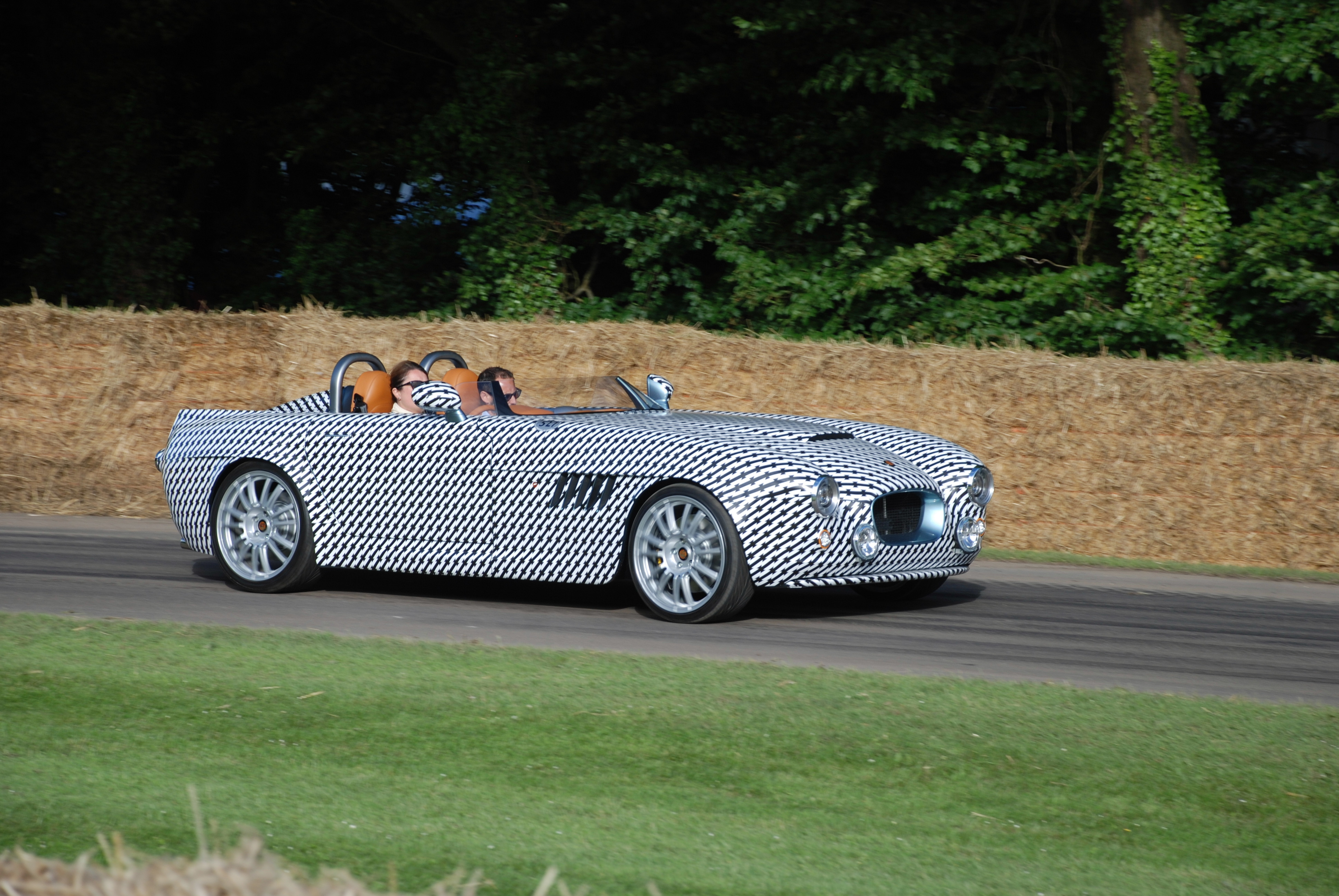
Pre-production Bristol Bullet at the 2016 Goodwood Festival of Speed

The Bristol Bullet is a two-seat, open-top sports car produced by Bristol Cars. Originally announced under the working title of "Project Pinnacle" in 2015, it was first shown to the public under camouflage at the 2016 Goodwood Festival of Speed. The Bullet commemorates Bristol's 70th anniversary, and is the company's first all-new car since the Bristol Fighter, which was produced between 2004 and 2011, as well as the first Bristol car to utilize a carbon fibre body and a Morgan Plus 8 chassis. Power is sourced from a naturally aspirated 4.8-litre BMW V8 producing 400 bhp (298 kW; 406 PS), but will be the last Bristol to do so before switching to forced induction engines. The retro design was a homage of the Bristol 405 Drophead coupé.

The Bullet was officially revealed on 26 July 2016; hand-built production was due to start in Chichester in 2017, but Bristol cars was liquidated in 2020 with no cars produced. However, there are at least 8 completed chassis with BMW V8 running gear clearly visible in an urban explorer's video of the site before the liquidation auction, but which do not appear to have been part of the liquidation auction.
