= Bristol 411 =

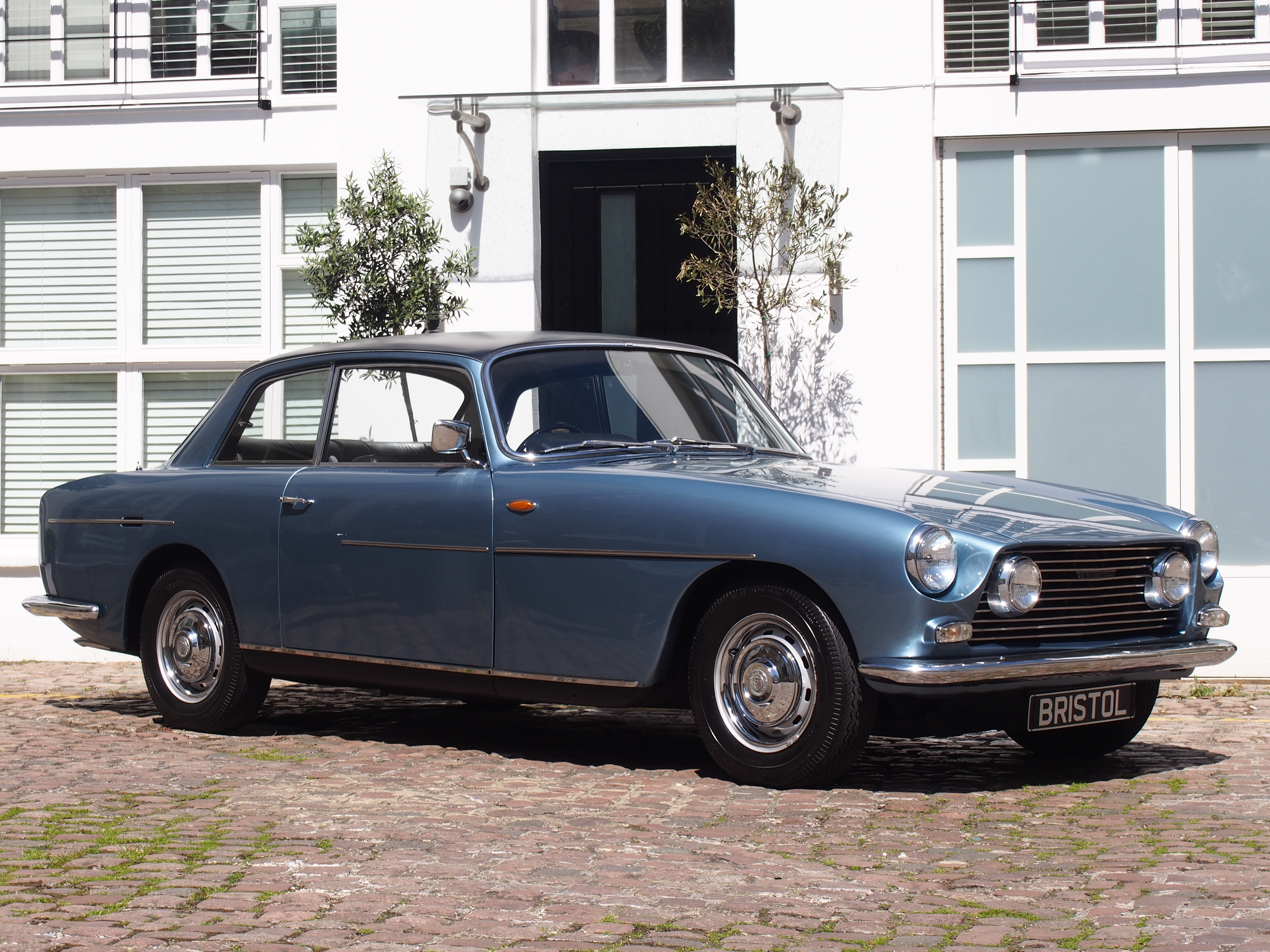
- Bristol 411 Series 1

Overview
- Manufacturer: Bristol Cars
- Production: 1969–1976; 287 produced
- Assembly: United Kingdom: Filton

Body and chassis
- Class: Sports saloon
- Body style: 2-door saloon
- Layout: FR layout

Powertrain
- Engine: 6.3 litres (383 cu in) Chrysler B V8; 6.6 litres (400 cu in) Chrysler B V8
- Transmission: 3-speed automatic

Dimensions
- Wheelbase: 2,896 mm (114.0 in)
- Length: 4,902 mm (193.0 in)
- Width: 1,727 mm (68.0 in)
- Height: 1,460–1,473 mm (57.5–58.0 in)
- Curb weight: 1,676–1,712 kg (3,695–3,774 lb)

Chronology
- Predecessor: Bristol 410
- Successor: Bristol 603; Bristol 412

The Bristol 411 is an automobile which was built by the British manufacturer Bristol Cars from 1969 to 1976. It was the fifth series of Chrysler-V8 engined Bristol models. The car was rated highly for its comfort, performance and handling by contemporary reviewers.

With the 411, Bristol, for the first time since the 407 was introduced, made a change of engine. Although they were still using a Chrysler V8 engine, the old A type engine was gone. Replacing it was the much larger big-block B series engine of 6,277 cc (383.0 cu in) - compared to the 5,211 cc of the 410. This much larger engine gave the 411 an estimated 30 percent more power and torque than had been found in the 410. The 411 was capable of 230 km/h (143 mph). To cope with this extra power, a limited-slip differential was fitted.

The interior showed a number of important changes from the Bristol 410. The traditional Blümel twin-spoke steering wheel was replaced by a more practical three-spoked leather-wrapped wheel, which, as a result of the traditional Bristol badge being removed from the front of the car, was the only place where this badge was retained.

== Changes ==
Over its seven years in production, the 411 showed a number of changes. The 1971 Series 2 added self-levelling suspension and a metric odometer, while the Series 3 from a year later had a lower compression ratio and completely revised styling. This edition was the first Bristol to possess the four-headlamp layout that was oddly anticipated by some of the company's earliest models, and to power this a bigger alternator was used. For the Series 4 of 1974, the compression ratio was reduced dramatically (from 9.5:1 to 8.2:1) but this was compensated for by using a larger version of the B series engine with a capacity of 6,556 cc (400.1 cubic inches). Previously, engine power outputs in the United States were quoted as gross power. By the time the larger engine was supplied to Bristol, the figures were quoted as net power outputs. The Series 4 & 5 cars engines produced 265 bhp (198 kW) and 335 lb⋅ft (454 N⋅m) torque. The rear lights were also changed using vertically mounted rectangular Lucas clusters, that carried over to the early 603 models. The Series 5 made from 1975 to 1976 had the original Bristol badge restored and was the first Bristol to feature inertia reel seat belts.

In 2010, Bristol Cars offered a modernised version of the Bristol 411, the Series 6. This was a refurbished version based on existing 411s. The only engine is the fuel injected 5.9 litre Chrysler Magnum V8 as used in the later Bristol Blenheim, allowing for up to 400 hp (298 kW) depending on the customer's desires.

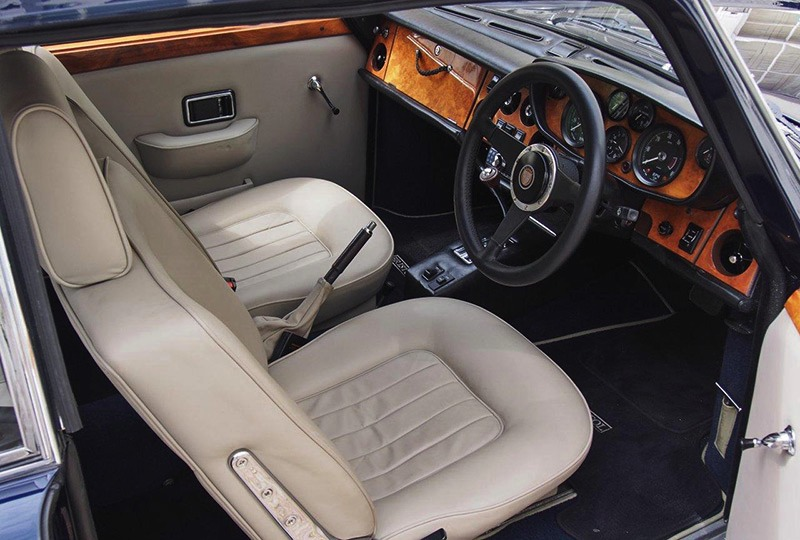
Series 1 interior

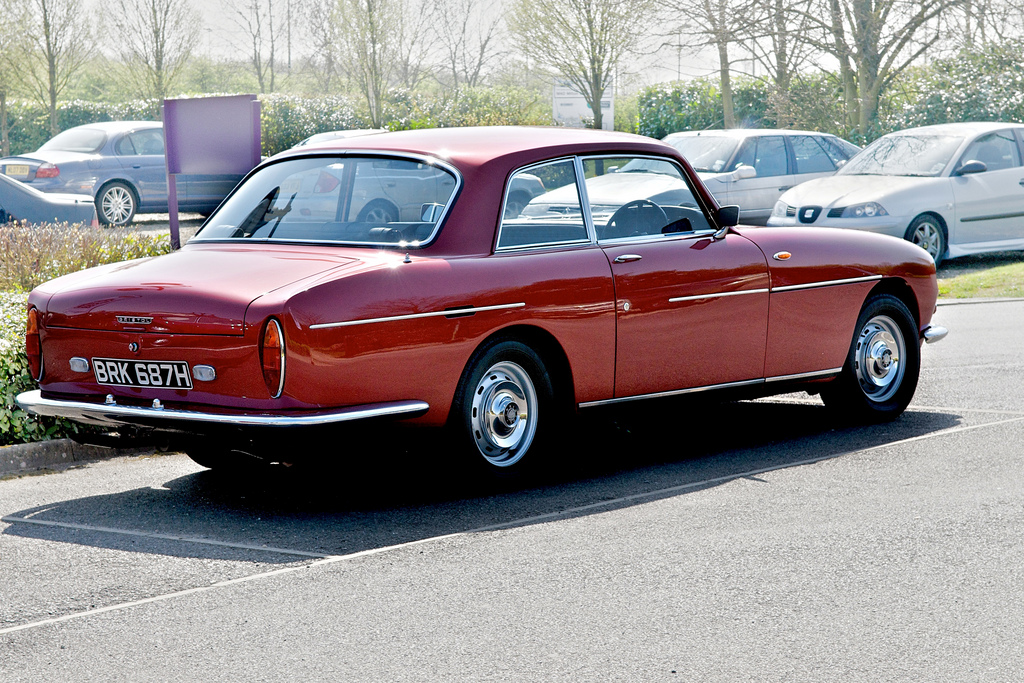
Series 1, rear view

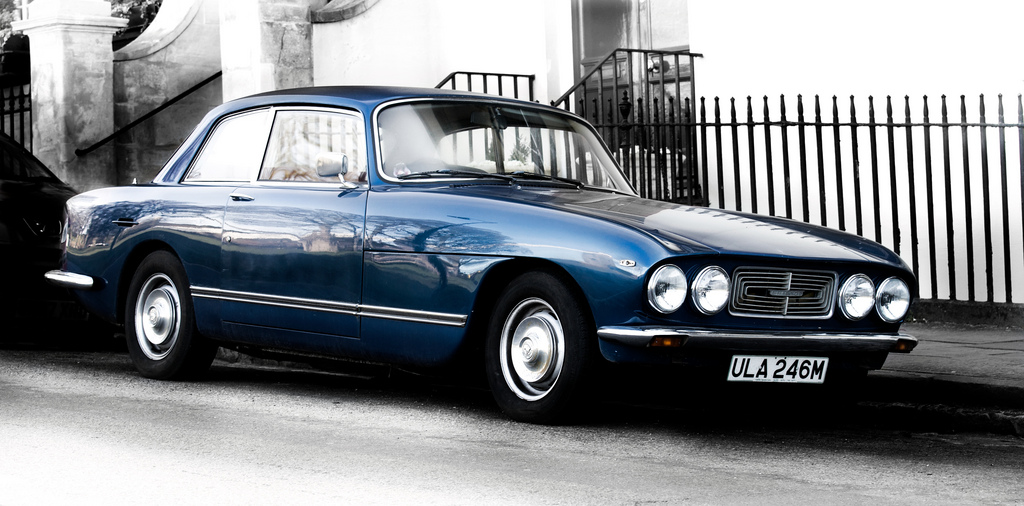
Bristol 411 Series 4, with quad headlights

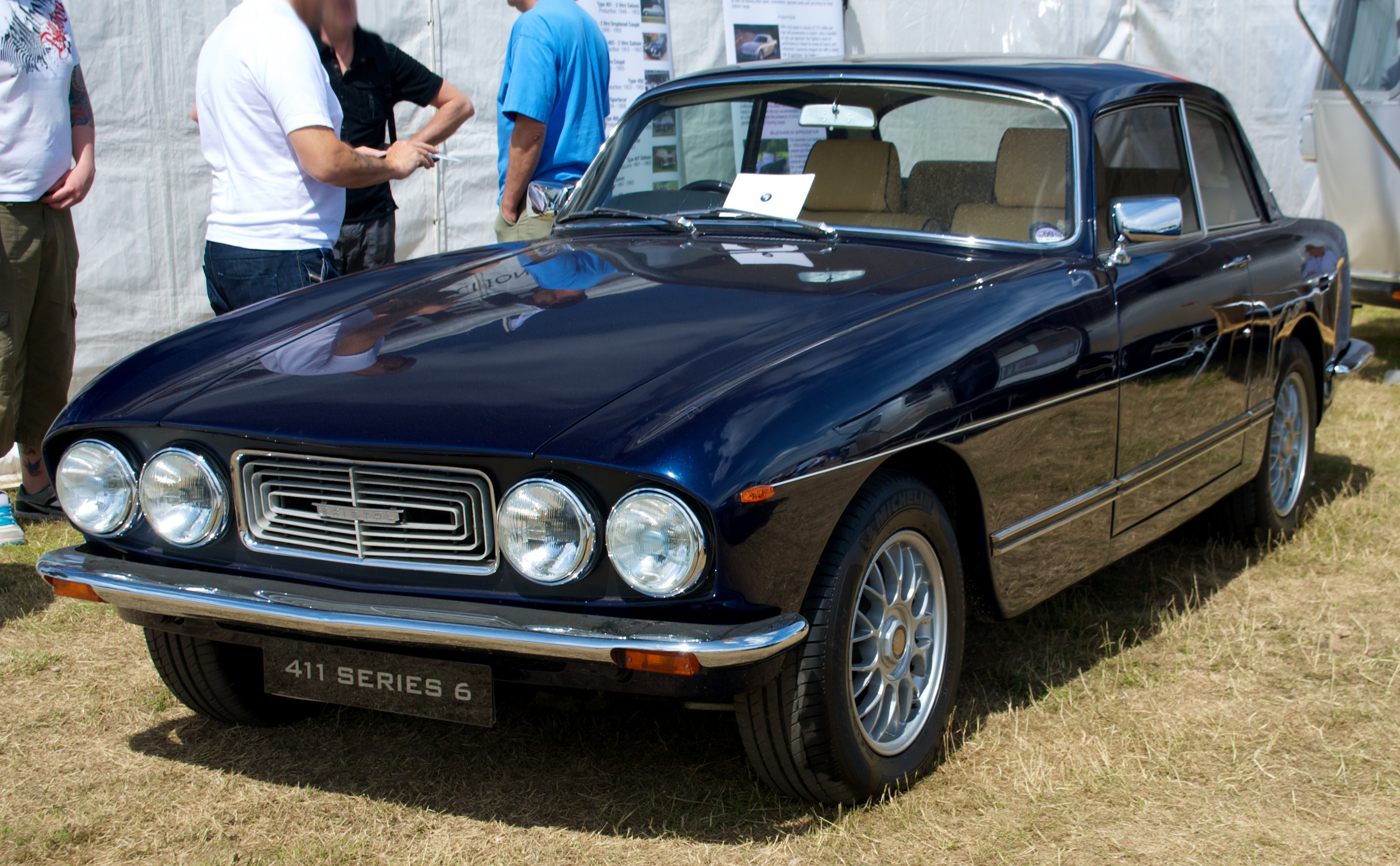
Series 6
