= Bristol Cars =

Manufacturer of hand-built luxury cars

Coordinates: 51°31′44″N 2°35′21″W

- Type: Private
- Industry: Automotive
- Founded: 1945
- Defunct: 2020
- Fate: Liquidation
- Headquarters: Bristol Filton Airport, and later Patchway, Bristol, United Kingdom
- Key people: Sir George S.M. White, Tony Crook
- Products: Cars
- Parent: Bristol Aerospace Limited
- Website: bristol-cars.co.uk

Bristol Cars was a British manufacturer of hand-built luxury cars headquartered in Bristol, England. It was formed from the car division of the Bristol Aeroplane Company after the Second World War and later became independent as Bristol Cars Limited. After being placed in receivership and being taken over in 2011, it entered liquidation in February 2020.

Bristol was always a low-volume manufacturer; the most recent published official production figures were for 1982, which stated that 104 cars were produced in that year. The company also had only one sales showroom, on the corner of Kensington High Street and Holland Road in London.

The company suspended manufacturing in March 2011, when administrators were appointed, 22 staff were made redundant at the factory in Filton, Bristol and subsequently the company was dissolved. In April 2011, a new company was formed by the administrator to sell the original assets to Kamkorp. The new company was liquidated in 2020 in order to pay creditors. Another revival was announced in 2026, initially to produce a small continuation run of five Bristol Fighters.

== History ==
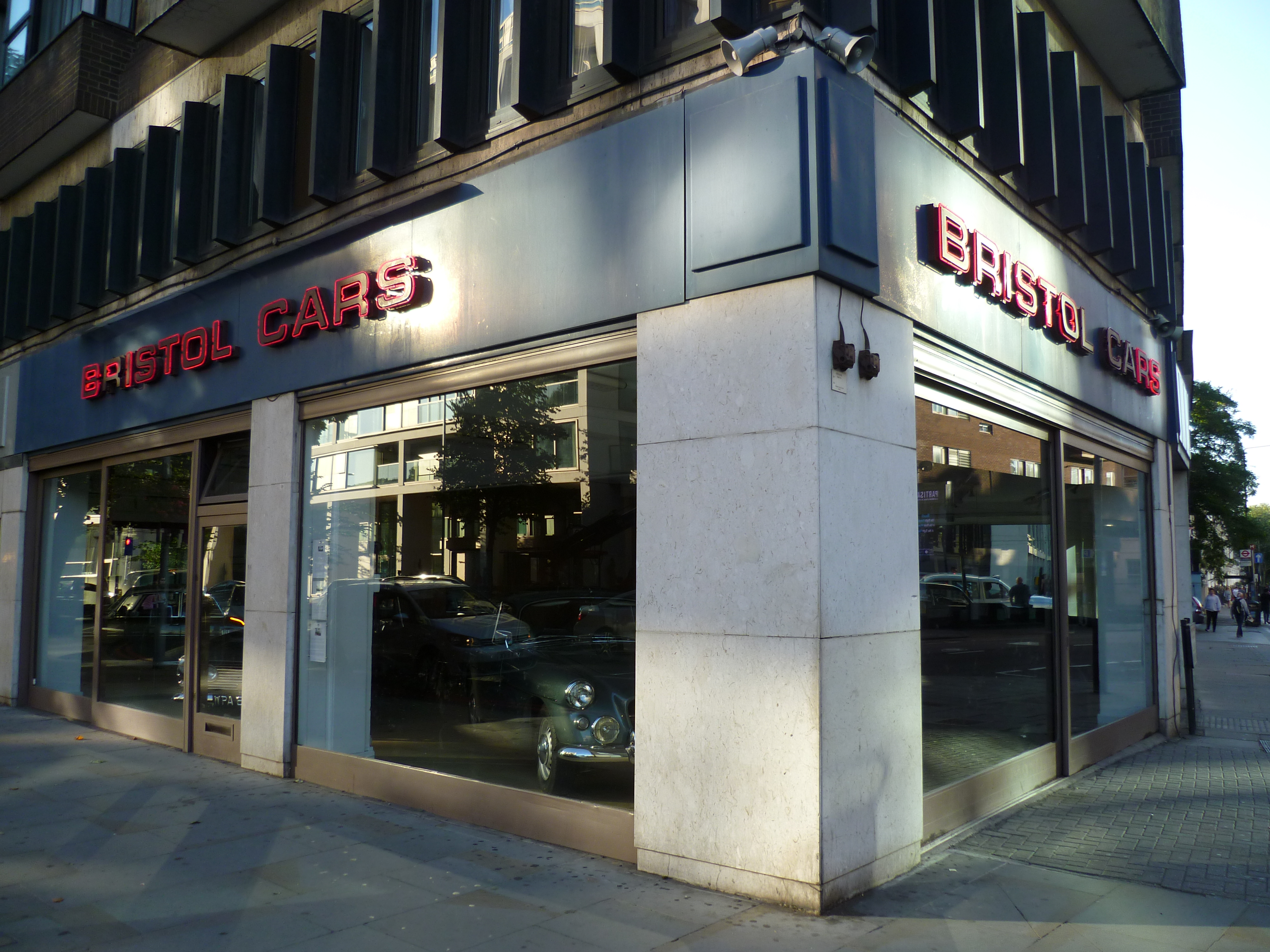
The Bristol Cars showroom on Kensington High Street

The British aircraft industry suffered a dramatic loss of orders and great financial difficulties following the Armistice of 1918. To provide immediate employment for its considerable workforce, the Bristol Aeroplane Company undertook the manufacture of a light car (the single-seat Bristol Monocar, powered by a motorcycle engine) and the construction of car bodies for Armstrong Siddeley, alongside bus bodies for their sister company, Bristol Tramways.

On the outbreak of World War II, Sir G. Stanley White, managing director of the Bristol Aeroplane Company from 1911 to 1954, was determined not to suffer the same difficulties a second time. The company now employed 70,000 and he knew he must plan for the time when the wartime demand for Bristol aircraft and aircraft engines would suddenly end. The company began working with AFN Ltd, manufacturers of Frazer Nash cars and British importer of BMWs before the war, on plans for a joint venture in automotive manufacture.

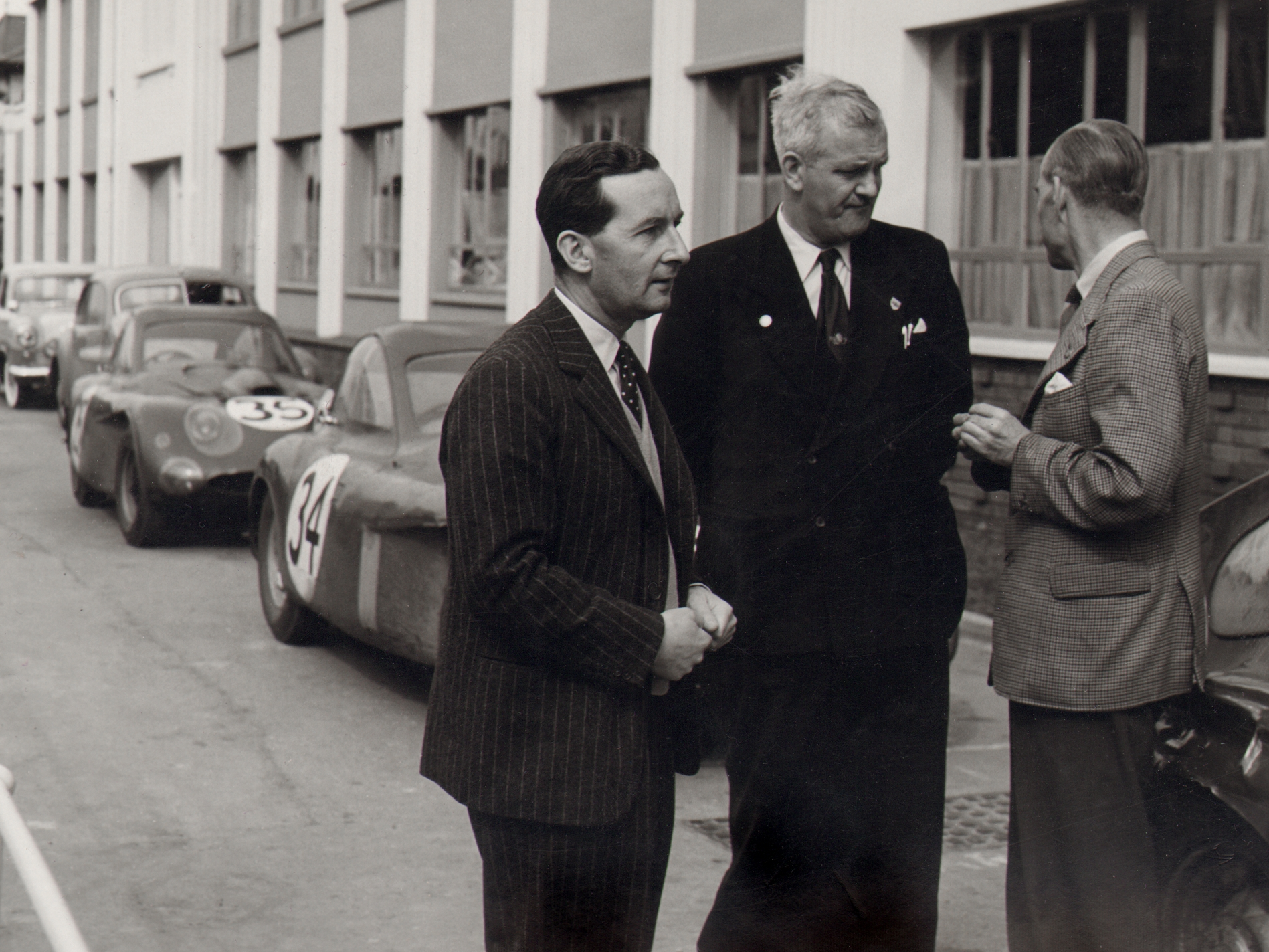
Sir George S.M. White with the Bristol 450 Le Mans cars

As early as 1941, a number of papers were written or commissioned by Sir George S.M. White, Sir Stanley's son, proposing a post-war car manufacturing division. It was decided to purchase an existing manufacturer for this purpose. Alvis, Aston Martin, Lagonda, ERA and Lea-Francis were considered.

=== Beginning ===
In May 1945, a chance discussion took place between D. A. Aldington, a director of AFN Ltd, then serving as an inspector for the wartime Ministry of Aircraft Production (MAP), and Eric Storey, an assistant of George White at the Bristol Aeroplane Company. By July 1945, the Bristol Aeroplane Company had created a car division and bought a controlling stake in AFN. A factory was established at Bristol Filton Airport, where Bristol Aeroplane already had substantial premises.

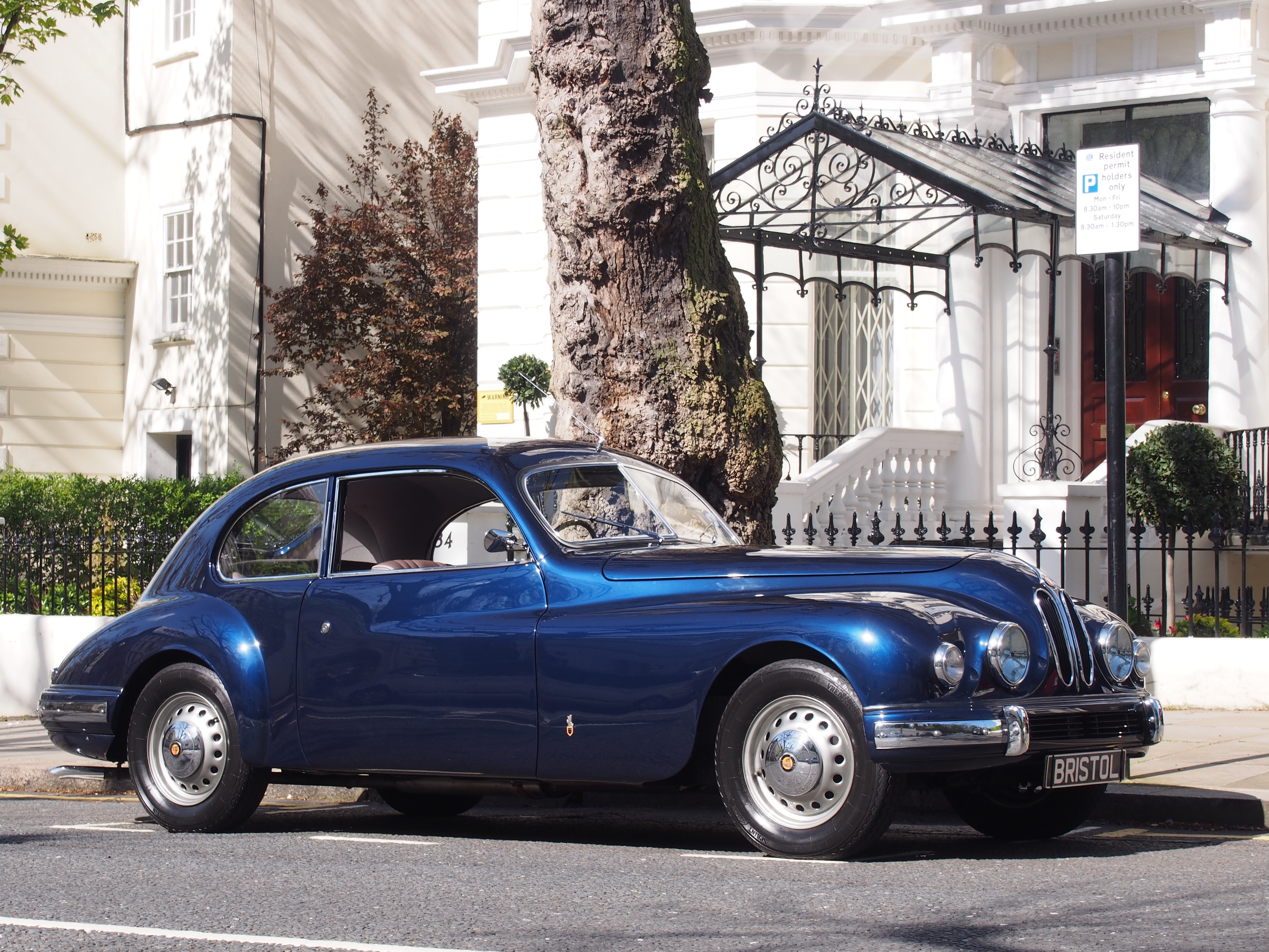
1952 Bristol 401

Aldington and his two brothers had marketed the Frazer Nash BMW before the war, and proposed to build an updated version after demobilisation. This seemed the perfect match for the aeroplane company's own ambitions to manufacture a high quality sports car. With the support of the War Reparations Board, H. J. Aldington travelled to Munich and purchased the rights to manufacture three BMW models and the 328 engine.

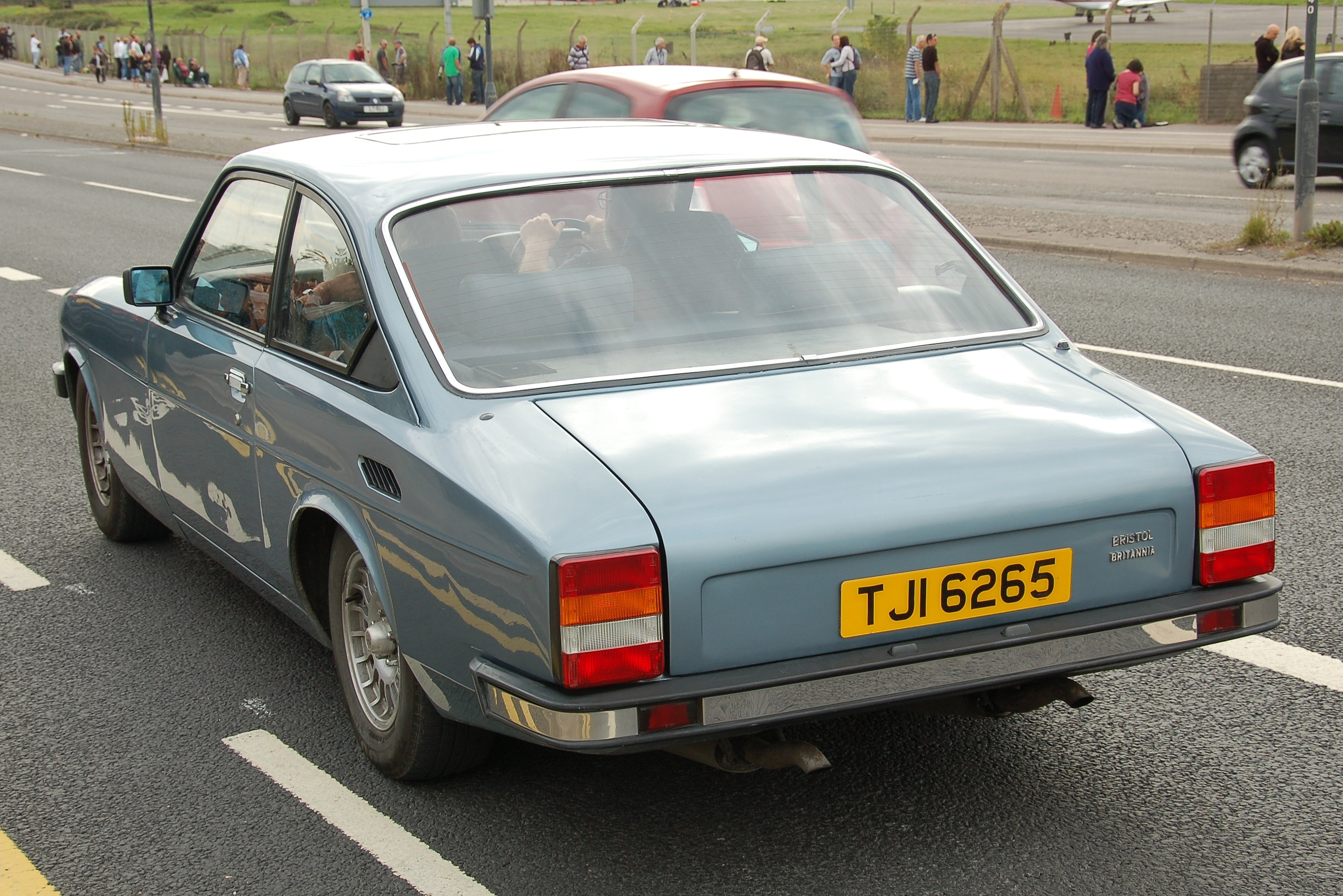
The Bristol Britannia was produced from 1982 to 1993 and was replaced by the Blenheim.

George White and Reginald Verdon-Smith of the aeroplane company joined the new Frazer Nash Board, but in January 1947, soon after the first cars had been produced, differences between the Aldingtons and Bristol led to the resale of Frazer Nash. The Bristol car division became an independent entity.

=== Independence ===
Bristol Cars was sold after its parent joined with other British aircraft companies in 1960 to create the British Aircraft Corporation (BAC), which later became part of British Aerospace.

The car division originally merged with Bristol Siddeley Engines, and was marked for closure, but was bought in September 1960 by George White, the chairman and effective founder. White retained the direction of the company, but sold a forty per cent shareholding to Tony Crook, a leading Bristol agent. Crook then became sole distributor.

=== New ownership ===
In September 1969, only a month before the unveiling of the new Bristol 411 at the Earl's Court Motor Show, Sir George S.M. White suffered a serious accident in his Bristol 410. The car was only superficially damaged, but he suffered severe trauma.

As time passed it became clear that he would never regain his health sufficiently to return to full-time work. To safeguard the future of his workforce, he decided in 1973 to sell his majority shareholding to Crook. As the ties with the White family were severed, British Aerospace requested the company to move its factory from Filton Aerodrome and it found new premises in nearby Patchway. The showroom on Kensington High Street became the head office, with Crook shuttling between the two in Bristol's light aircraft.

Under Crook's direction the company produced at least six types, the names of which were largely borrowed from Bristol's aeronautical past: the Beaufighter, Blenheim, Britannia and Brigand.

=== End of the second era ===
In February 1997, Crook, then aged 77, sold a fifty per cent holding in Bristol Cars to Toby Silverton, with an option to take full control within four years. Silverton, then son-in-law of Joe Lewis of the Tavistock Group and son of Arthur Silverton of Overfinch, joined the board with his father.

Crook and Toby Silverton produced the Speedster, Bullet, Blenheim and 411 Series 6, though 2002 saw the transfer of Bristol Cars fully into the ownership of Silverton and the Tavistock Group, with Silverton in the chair and Crook remaining as managing director. Together they developed a V10 engined two-seater named after the first Sir George White's First World War two-seater aircraft, the Bristol Fighter. Crook finally relinquished his connection with Bristol Cars in August 2007.

=== Kamkorp era (2011–2020) ===
On 3 March 2011 it was announced that Bristol Cars had gone into administration, with the loss of 22 jobs when the factory at Filton, Bristol was shut down. On 21 April 2011 another new company was formed to sell the assets of the former dissolved company; that company was purchased by Kamkorp, which also owned Frazer-Nash Research, a technology manufacturer of electric power systems. During this era, the company focused on restoring and selling all models of the marque while a new model was being developed.

In 2015 Bristol Cars announced the development of a new model codenamed "Project Pinnacle". Initial reports indicated it would be a petrol-electric hybrid with a petrol engine from BMW. However a later media report and a May 2015 press release, indicated that the car would have non-hybrid V8 power. The car, a two-seater roadster, made its first public appearance, slightly camouflaged, at the Goodwood Festival of Speed in June 2016. In July, the car was shown undisguised, technical details were announced, and its name given as the Bristol Bullet. However, subsequently there was no further news about the car's homologation, and many members of the sales and marketing team soon left the company. The Bullet was said to be powered by a normally aspirated 370 bhp (280 kW; 380 PS) 4.8-litre BMW N62 V8 engine (sharing the same drivetrain and chassis as the most recent Morgan Aero 8) driving the rear wheels, had a body of carbon fibre, weighed 1130 kg, and would cost £95,000. The planned production run was said to be limited to 70 cars to commemorate the marque's 70th anniversary.

On 5 March 2020 it was reported that Bristol cars had been officially wound up in order to pay creditors, with court-ordered liquidation under way. The Bristol Owners Club working together with the Bristol Owners and Drivers Association and the Bristol Owners Heritage Trust is reported to be actively engaged in order to preserve the heritage and associated spares for the marque.

=== Post liquidation (since 2021) ===
In 2021, intellectual property rights to Bristol Cars were registered by Bristol Fighter Limited, a subsidiary of Bristol Manufacturing Limited, owned by Essex based investor and property developer Jason Wharton, with revocation of 297 defunct trademarks. Wharton plans to transform the company into a "leading British electric vehicle company" by 2026, the brand's 80th anniversary. The new Bristol Cars would firstly launch "remastered" versions of historic cars with modernised mechanicals on a built to order basis. It was also reported that the new company will subsequently revive the Buccaneer nameplate for an all new electric vehicle. Shortly after this announcement, however, controversy erupted between Wharton and Bristol's insolvency practitioner Frost Group. The practitioner stated that Wharton had in fact not purchased any intellectual property rights, but had merely purchased certain tooling and spares at the auction of the company's assets. Despite this controversy, plans to revive the brand continued and Wharton announced in 2024 that Bristol would be revived as a contemporary coachbuilder by 2026.

In September 2026 the revived Bristol Cars company, headed by Paul King and Richard Hackett, was announced at the Salon Privé Concours d'Elegance. The company's first product is to be a run of five new Fighters, built on existing, unfinished chassis from 2008, adding to the original 13 examples built from 2004 until 2011 (with a 14th chassis having been completed in 2015). The continuation cars will still use the Viper's 8.0-litre V10 engine, offered with either 525 or 600 bhp (391 or 447 kW).

== Pre-war BMW designs, Aldington brothers and early cars ==
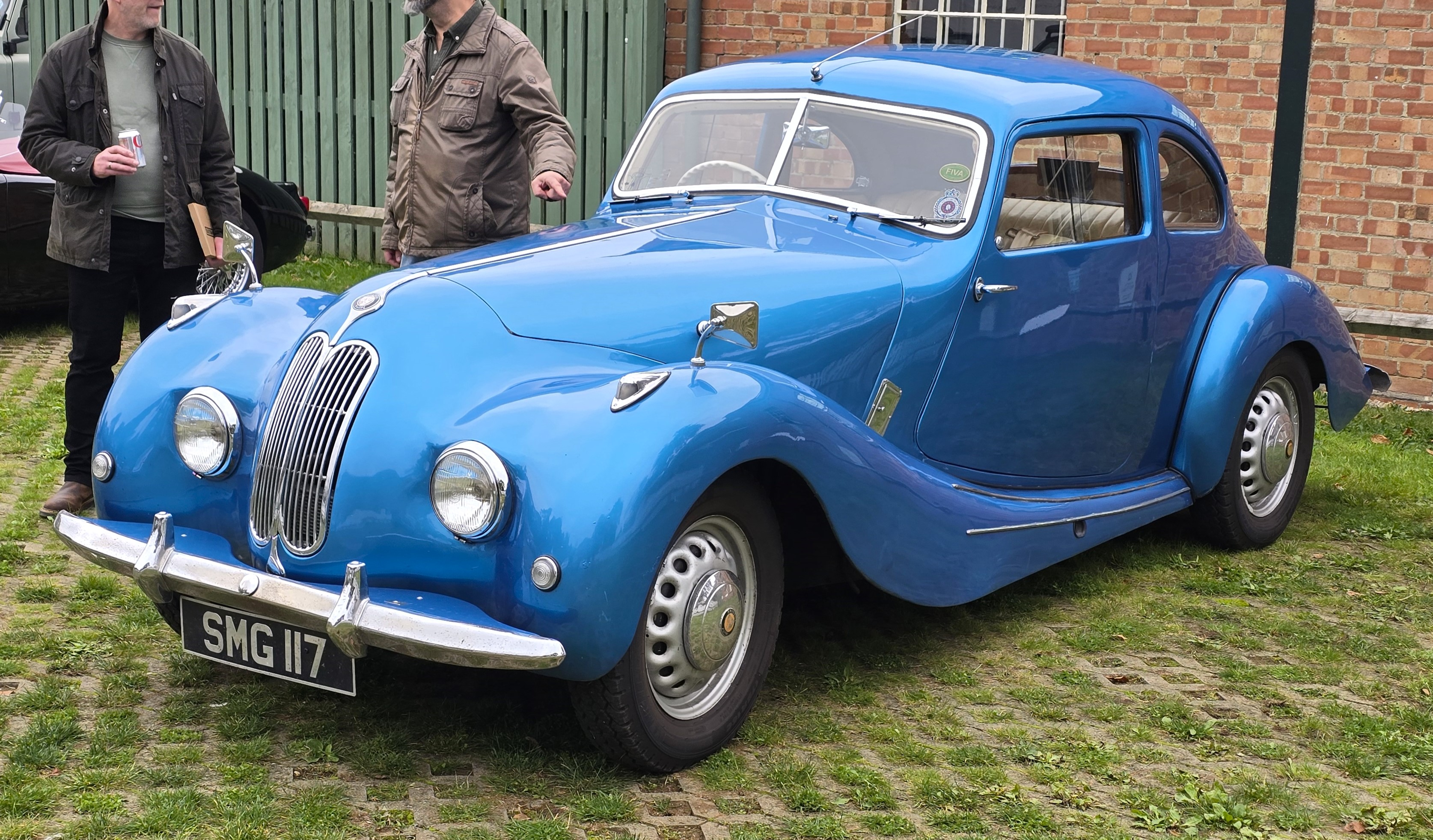
Bristol 400, 1946–1950

HJ Aldington, a director of the Bristol Aeroplane Company affiliated AFN (BMW's pre-war concessionaire in the UK), used his British Army connections to visit the bombed BMW factory in Munich several times post-war. In 1945 he took plans for BMW cars back to Britain, and BMW chief engineer, Dr. Fritz Fiedler was also employed. Its first car was the Bristol 400, prototyped in 1946 and introduced at the 1947 Geneva Motor Show. Derived from immediately pre-WW2 BMW products (thanks to a connection to BMW through Frazer Nash), the chassis was based on the BMW 326, the engine on the 328, and the body on the 327. Even a variation on the famous double-kidney BMW grille was retained. Bristol, however, did a thorough examination of the car's handling and ended up with performance "only matched by outright purpose-built competition cars". Seven hundred of the Bristol 400 were built, 17 of which received "handsome" drophead bodywork from Pininfarina.

In 1949, the 400 was joined by the five-place 401. Bodied by Touring, it was aerodynamically sleeker, accelerated better, and had higher top speed. It was joined by the drophead 402, of which just 24 examples were built.

The 403 followed in 1953, which featured improved brakes, gearbox, dampers, heater, and engine (a detuned racing motor, in fact). Bristol would use this same engine in the 450, entered at Le Mans in 1953; it broke its experimental crankshaft, but despite being less than aerodynamically ideal proved fully five seconds a lap quicker than the competition. Bristol withdrew from racing two years later.

Along with the 403 was the 404, on a shorter wheelbase, with a more powerful engine and styling reminiscent of the 450. The 404 introduced a concealed front wing-mounted spare wheel and battery. It was built to extremely exacting standards, and the price reflected it; this, plus newly introduced "punitive taxation", meant only 40 were produced.

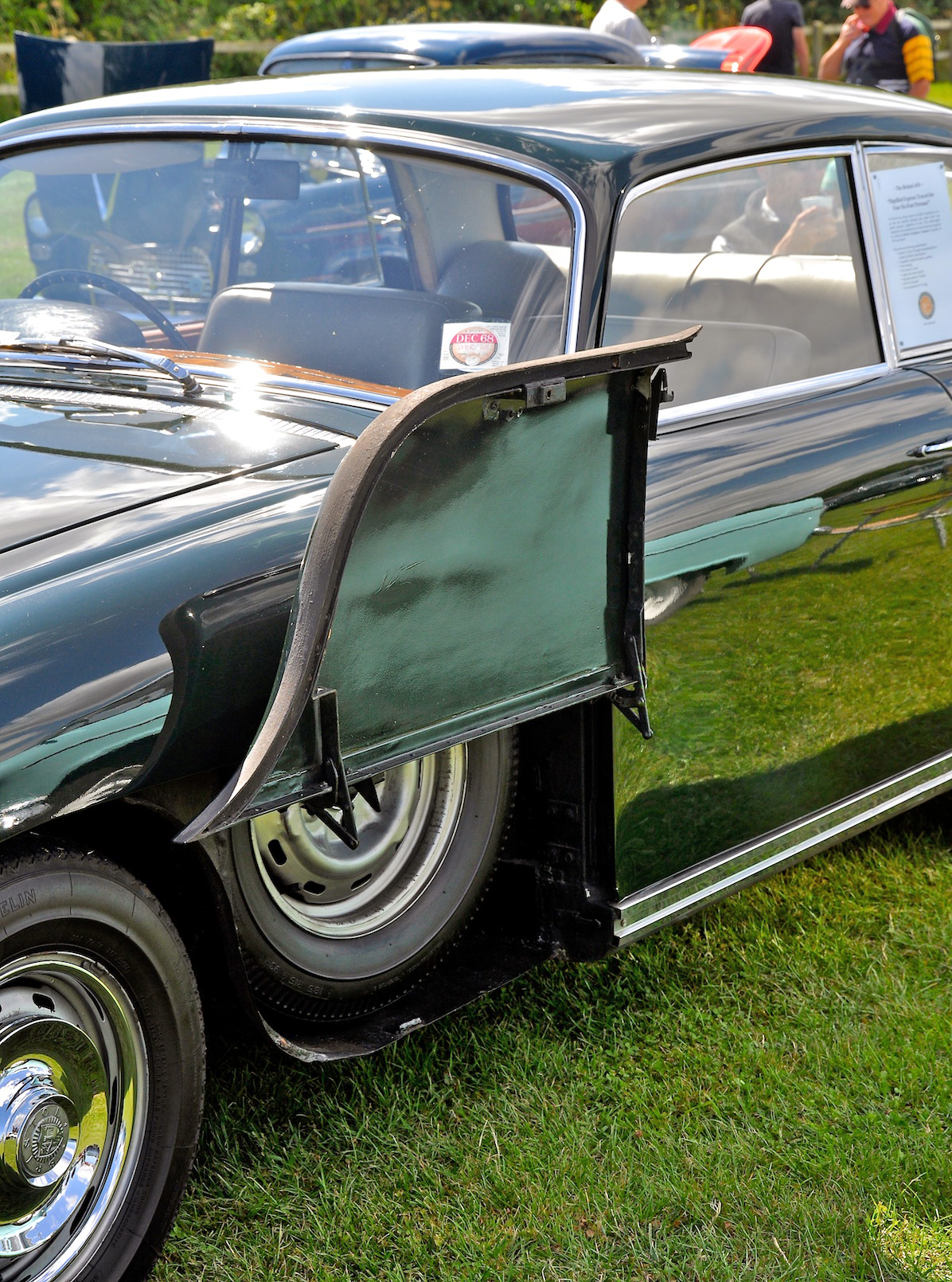
Bristol's traditional wing-mounted spare wheel on a Bristol 410

The 405, which entered production in 1954, was much more successful, not least for being Bristol's only four-door. It remained in production until 1958, with 297 saloons and 43 drophead coupés produced in all.

Bristol debuted the 406 in 1958, and it remained in production until 1961.

=== V8 cars ===
The 406's replacement, the 407, was powered by a 5.2-litre V8 provided by Chrysler of Canada.

It was followed in 1963 by the 408, with drastic restyling as well as improved suspension. This was succeeded by the 409. Many buyers preferred the crisp steering and gearbox of the earlier six-cylinder cars.

The 410, introduced in 1966, was a return to the high-performance touring tradition, offering the same top speed as the 409, and superior acceleration, with the same powerplant. It also saw Bristol become a private company and marked a return to quality to the exclusion of output: no more than three cars a week were to be made.

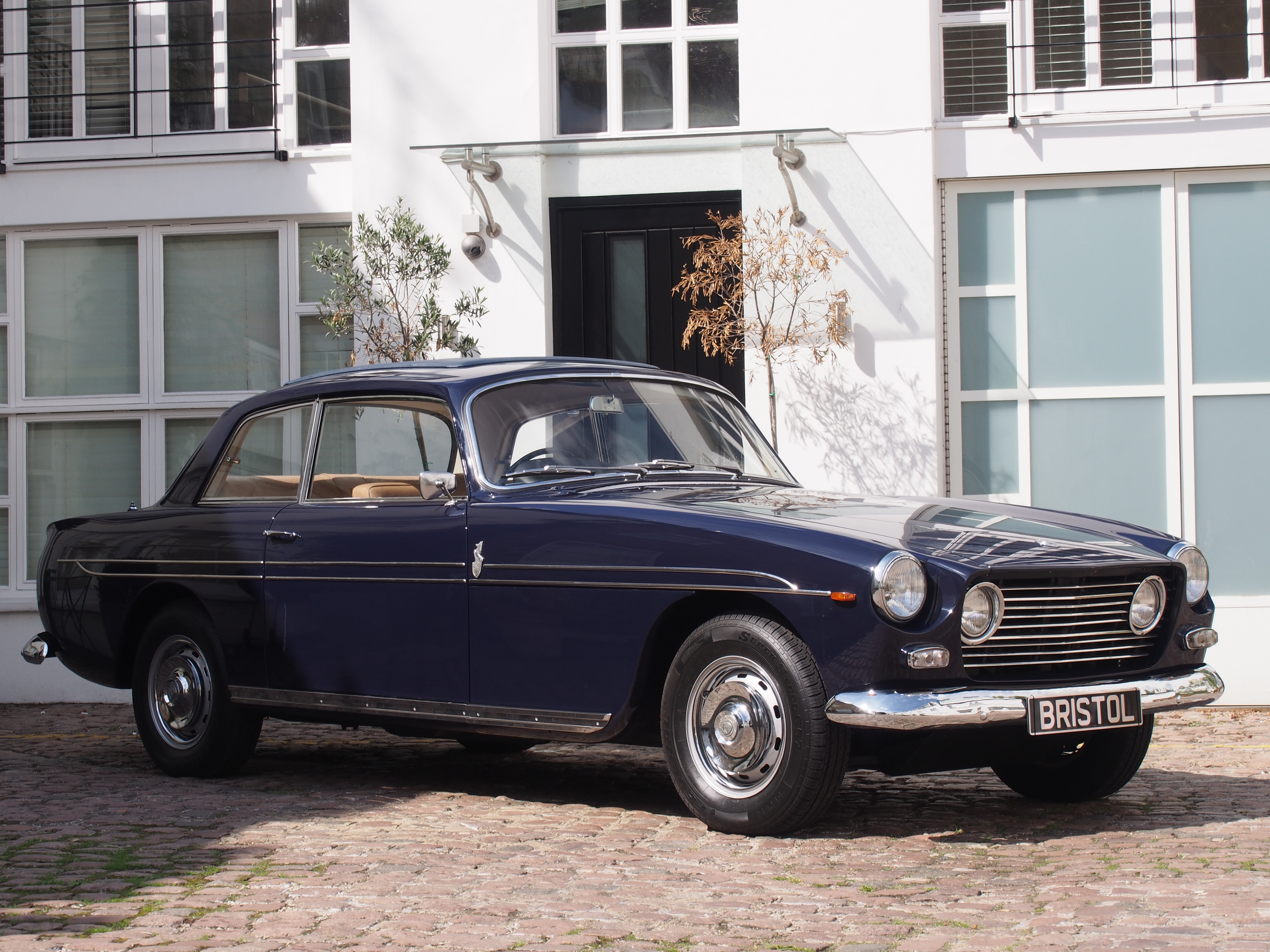
1968 Bristol 410

In 1969, the Bristol 411 appeared, with a new 6.2-litre Chrysler V8 (still rebuilt and modified by Bristol, as before) delivering higher top speed and even better acceleration.

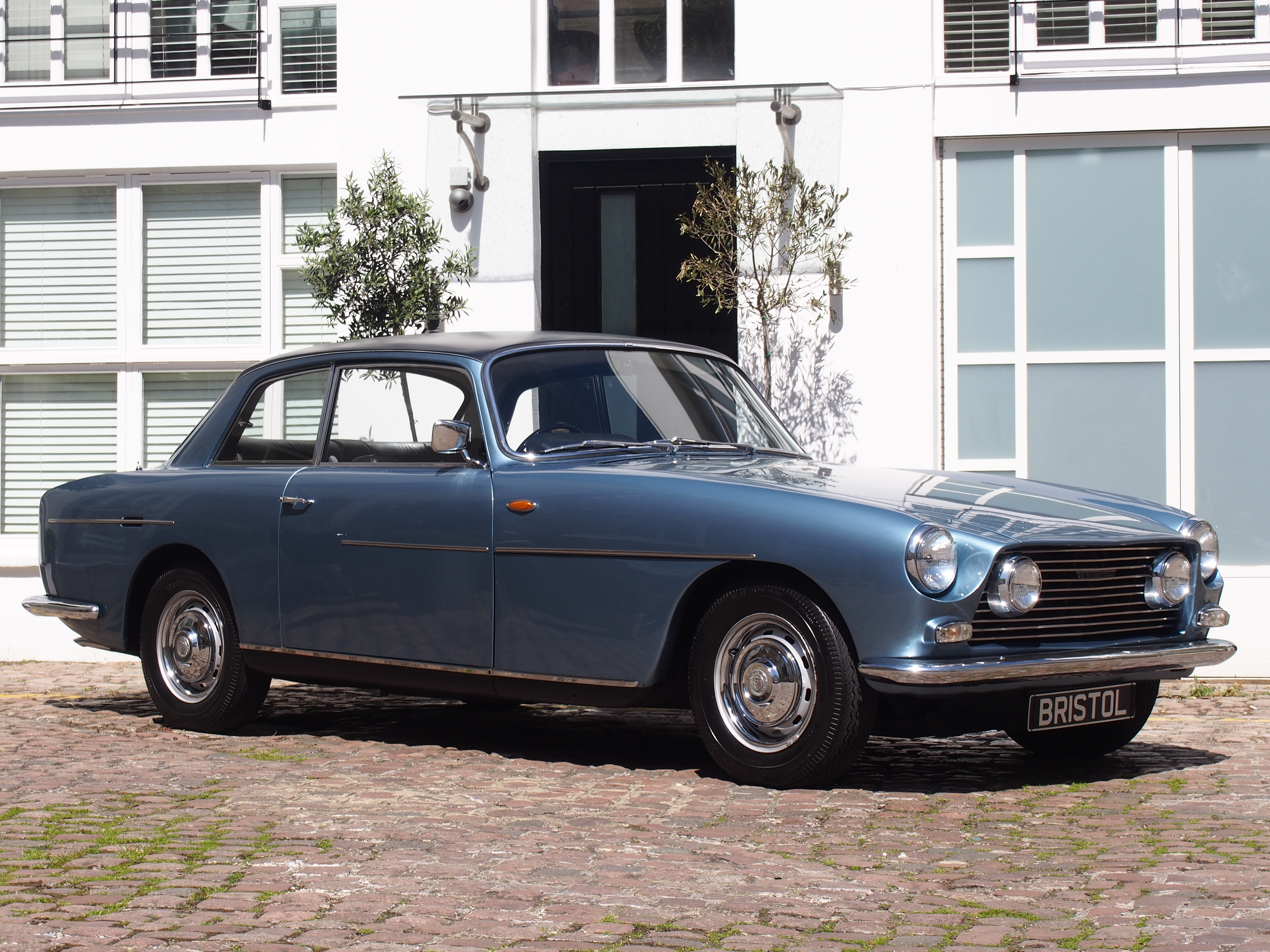
1970 Bristol 411 Series 1

=== Engines ===
Until 1961 all Bristol cars used Bristol-built derivatives of the BMW M328 2-litre six-cylinder engine. These engines also powered a number of sports and racing cars, including all post-war Frazer Nashes (apart from a few prototypes), some ACs, some Lotus and Cooper racing cars, and several others.

In 1961, with the launch of the Bristol 407, the company switched to larger Chrysler V8 engines, which were more powerful than Bristol's own, BMW derived 2.25-litre 6 cylinder engine. The Chrysler V8s could be bought off the shelf from Canadian Chrysler without the startup costs of Bristol's own 3.65-litre all alloy 6 then in development. All post-1961 Bristols, including the later Blenheim and Fighter models, used Chrysler engines.

== Models ==
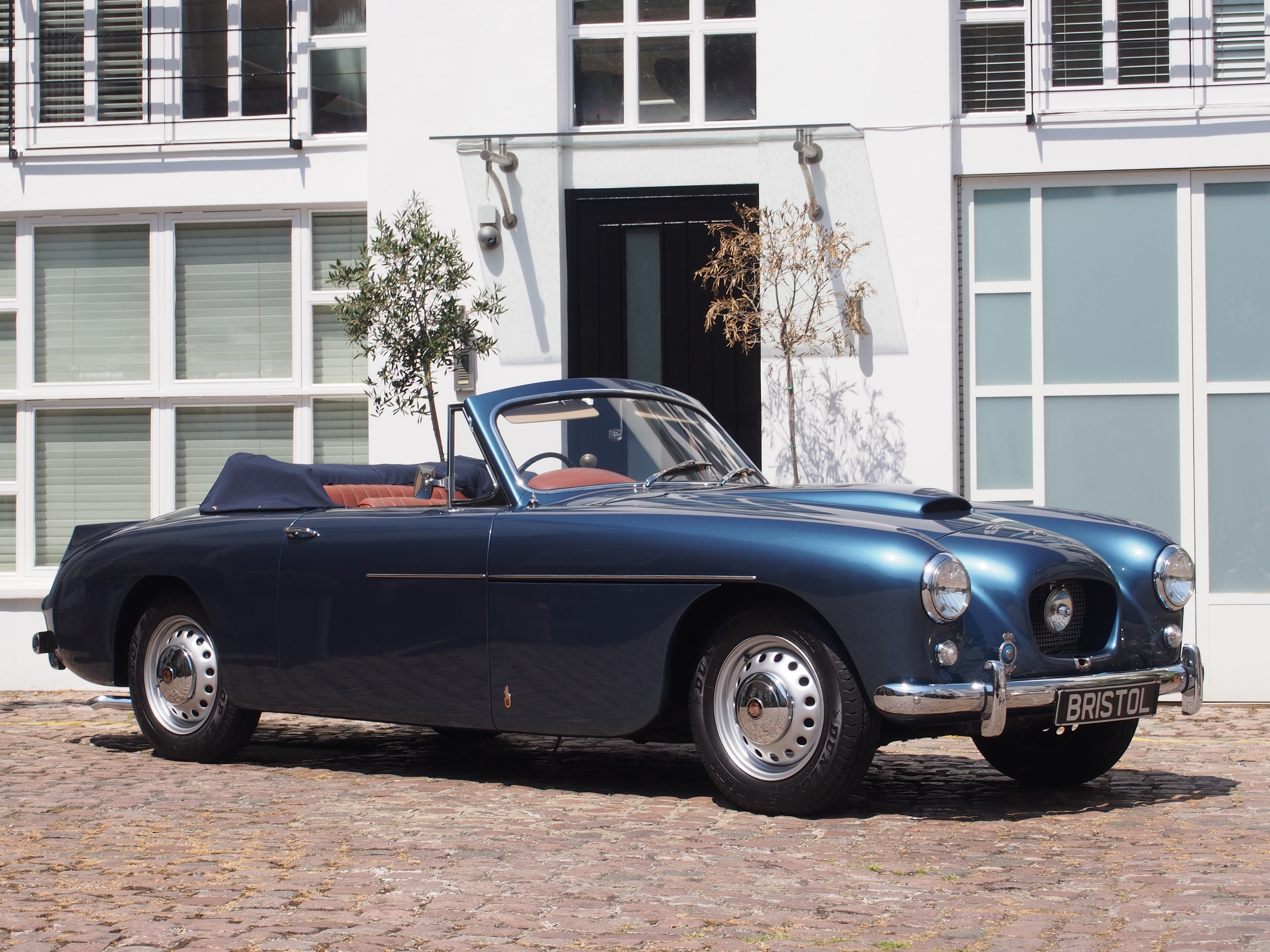
1956 Bristol 405 Drop Head Coupe, coachwork by Abbots of Farnham

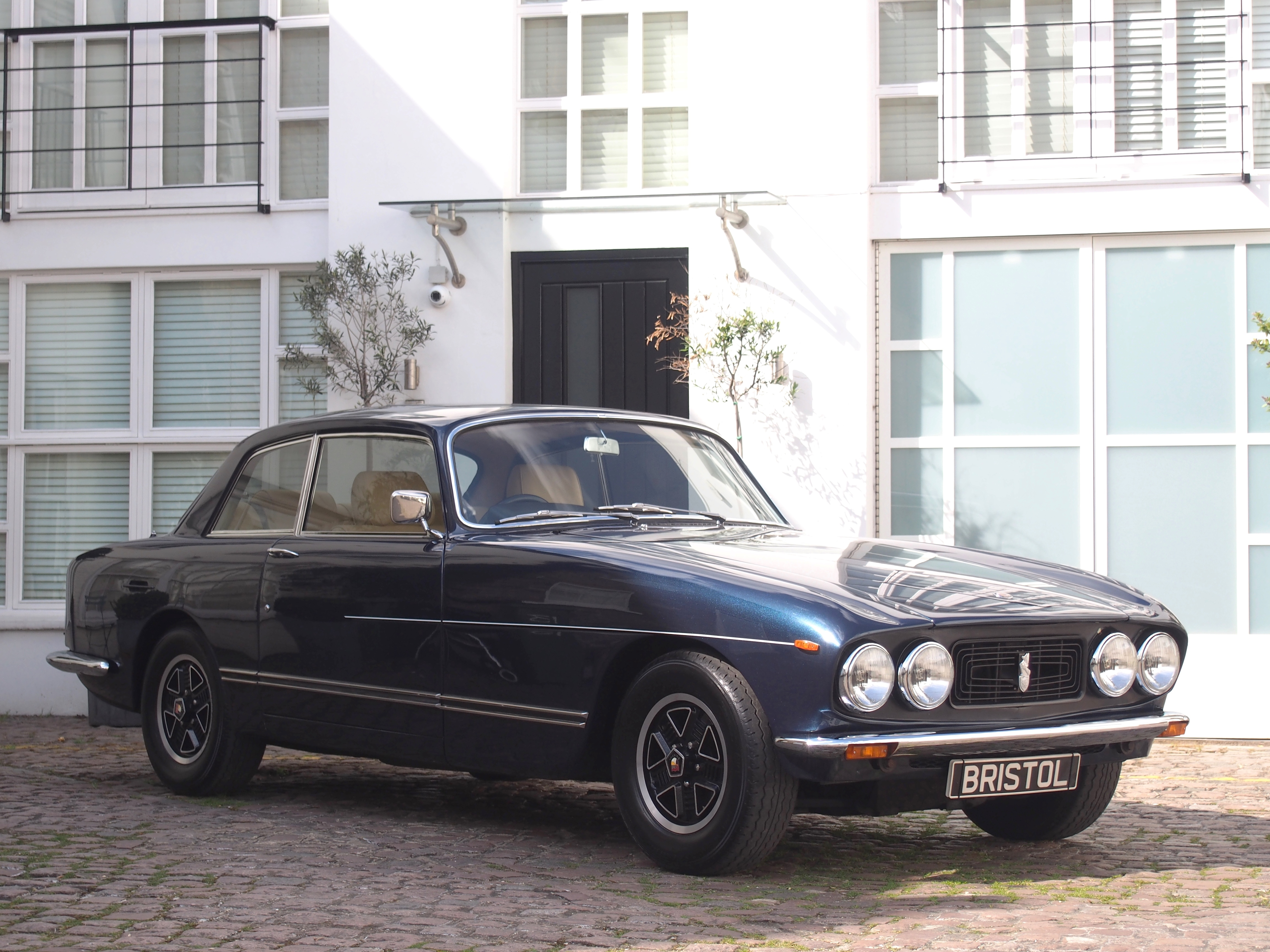
1974 Bristol 411 Series 4

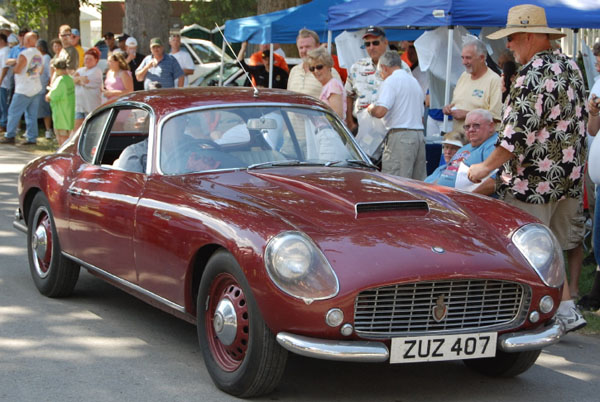
Bristol 407 Zagato

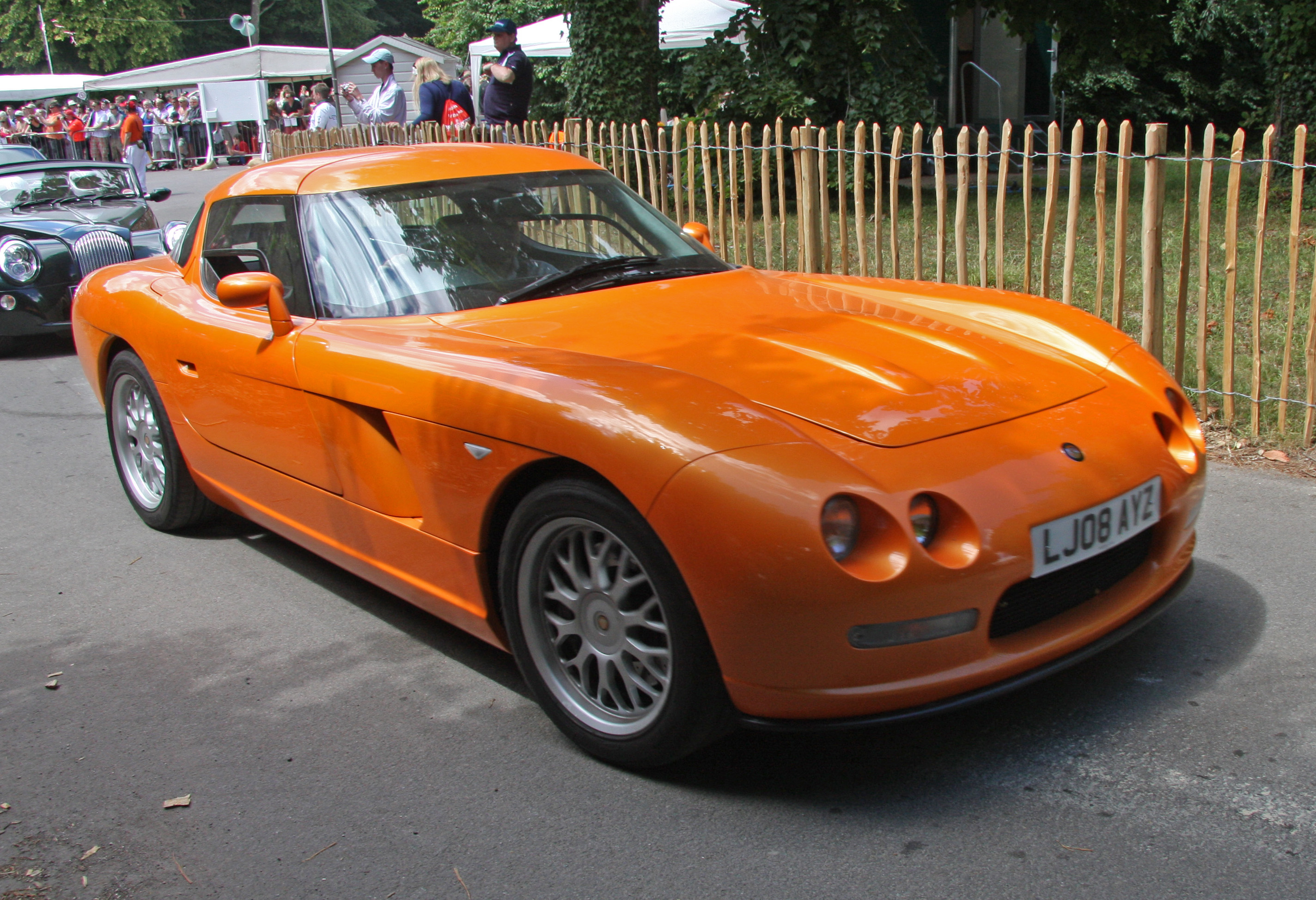
2004 Bristol Fighter

=== Bristol-engined cars ===
- Type 400 (1946–1950)
- Type 401 (1948–1953)
- Type 402 (1949–1950)
- Type 403 (1953–1955)
- Type 404 (1953–1955)
- Type 404X Arnolt Bristol (1954–1958)
- Type 405 (1954–1958)
- Type 406 (1958–1961)
- Type 450 (1953–1955)

=== Chrysler-engined cars ===
- Type 407 (1961–1963)
- Type 408 (1963–1965)
- Type 409 (1965–1967)
- Type 410 (1967–1969)
- Type 411 (1969–1976)
- Type 412/Beaufighter (1975–1993)
  - Beaufort
- Type 603 (1976–1982)
  - Britannia/Brigand (1982–1993)
- Blenheim (1993–2011)
  - Blenheim 2
  - Blenheim 3, 3S and 3G
  - Blenheim 4
- Blenheim Roadster/Speedster (2003–2011)
- Fighter (2004–2011)

=== BMW-engined cars ===
- Bullet (2016, one built)

== See also ==
- Bristol Commercial Vehicles
- List of car manufacturers of the United Kingdom
