= Bristol 409 =

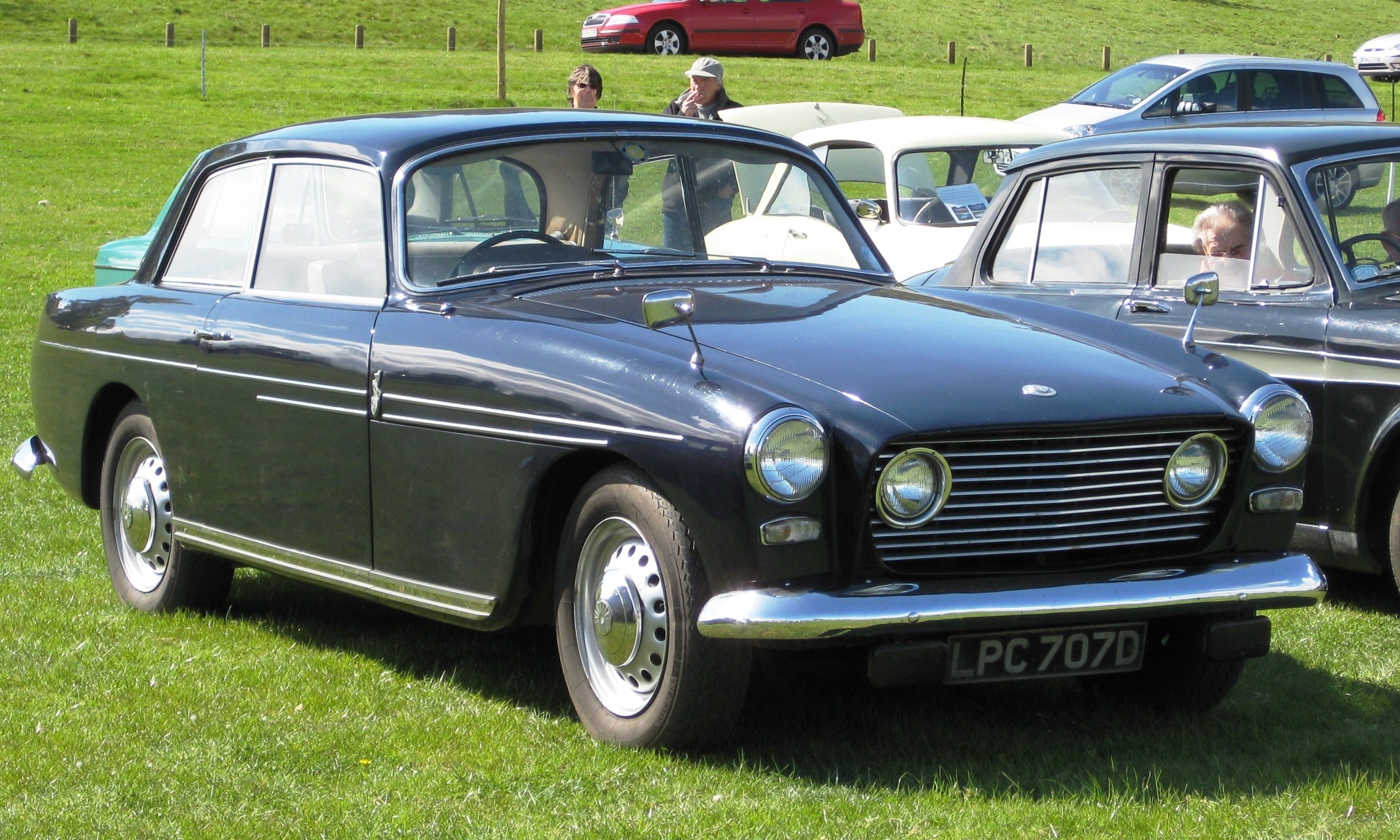

Overview
- Manufacturer: Bristol Cars
- Production: 1965–1967; 74 units
- Assembly: United Kingdom: Filton

Body and chassis
- Class: Sports saloon
- Layout: FR layout

Powertrain
- Engine: 5,204 cc (318 cu in) Chrysler A V8
- Transmission: 3 speed automatic

Dimensions
- Wheelbase: 114 in (2,896 mm)
- Length: 193.5 in (4,915 mm)
- Width: 68 in (1,727 mm)
- Height: 60 in (1,524 mm)
- Curb weight: 3,584 lb (1,626 kg)

Chronology
- Predecessor: Bristol 408
- Successor: Bristol 410

The Bristol 409 was the third series of cars from British manufacturer Bristol Cars powered by Chrysler V8 engines. It was actually introduced before the older Bristol 408 went out of production and only gradually supplanted that model after a year.

There were a number of major changes to the chassis of the 409 compared to earlier Bristols. The springs were much softer than of the 408 or 407, so that the ride quality was much better. Following on from Chrysler's pioneering work in the early 1960s, Bristol fitted an alternating current alternator in place of the traditional direct current dynamo, which had proven difficult to drive at high engine speeds. Also a follow-up to previous work on the 408 was an improved safety lever to prevent anyone from putting the automatic transmission in gear accidentally. There was also an altered differential fitted with a slightly higher (i.e. numerically lower) ratio.

The styling was almost unchanged from the 408, though the radiator grille was now altered into a trapezoidal shape with a rounded bottom, rather than the precise rectangle of the 408.

The engine was also altered slightly from the 408 Mark II – remaining at 5,204 cc (317.6 cu in) but providing slightly increased power and torque. The 409 was the first Bristol to be offered with power steering, initially as an optional extra but after June 1967 as a standard feature.

The 409 was the last Bristol V8 to feature dashboard transmission selector buttons. The subsequent Bristol 410 sported a central transmission shift lever, as well as a more streamlined frontal design.

Rear view
