= Carrozzeria Viotti =

Italian coachbuilding company

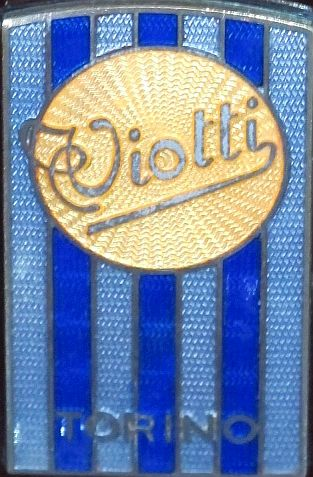
- Industry: Automotive
- Founded: 1921, Turin Italy
- Founder: Vittorio Viotti
- Headquarters: Italy
- Key people: Pietro Frua
- Services: Automotive design, Coachbuilding

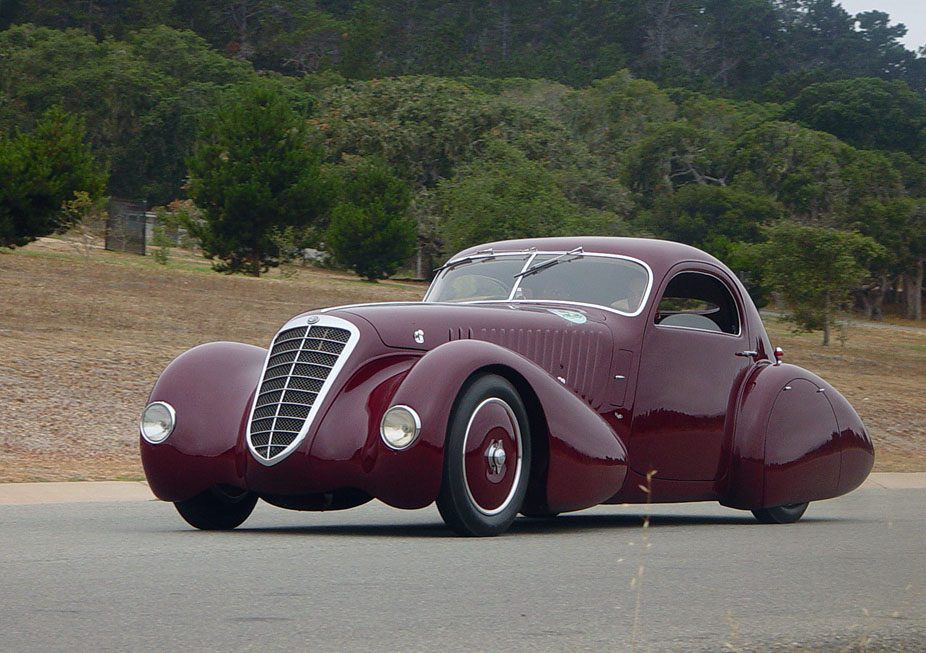
Alfa Romeo 8C 2300 Viotti Coupé

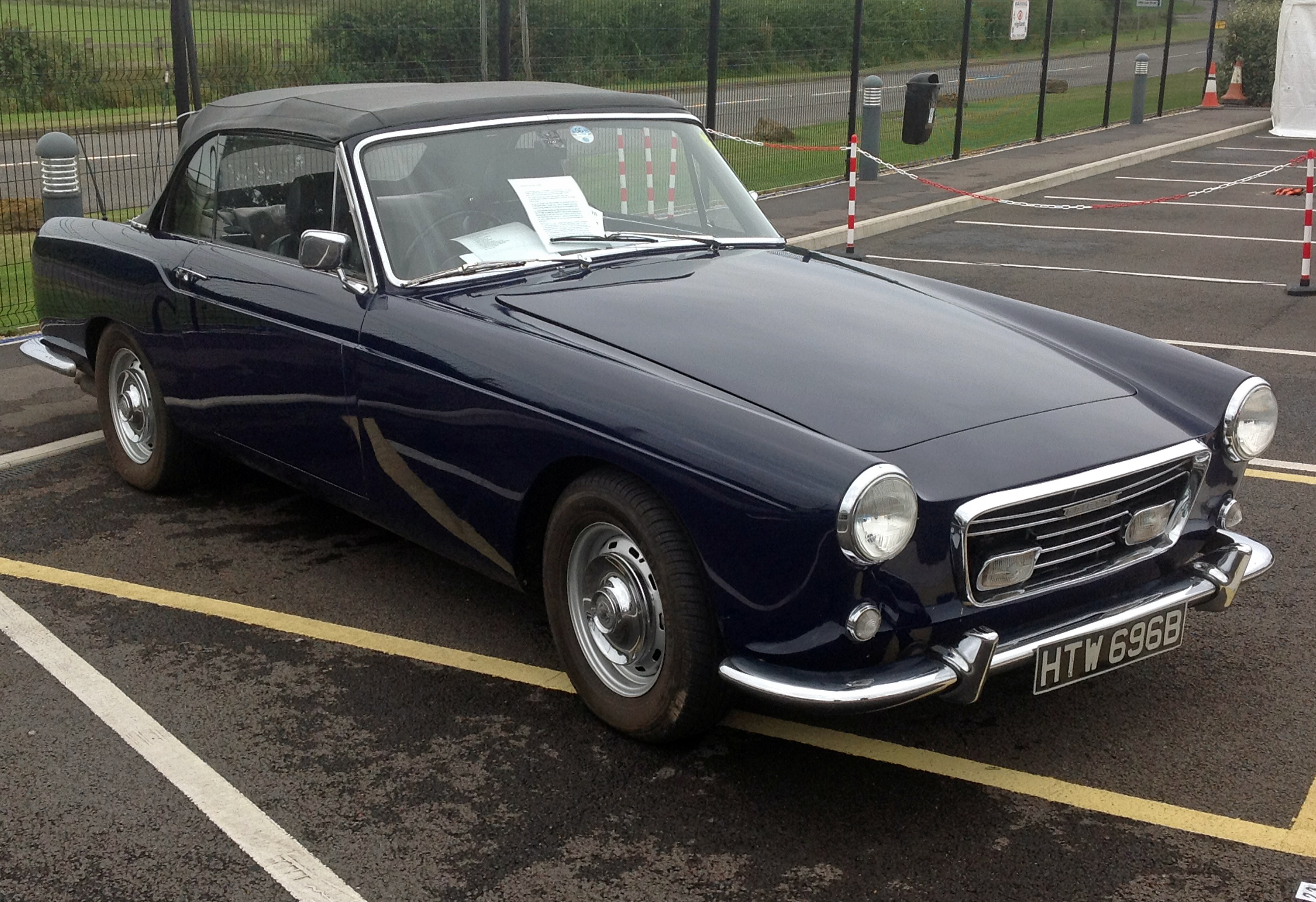
1963 Bristol 407 Viotti

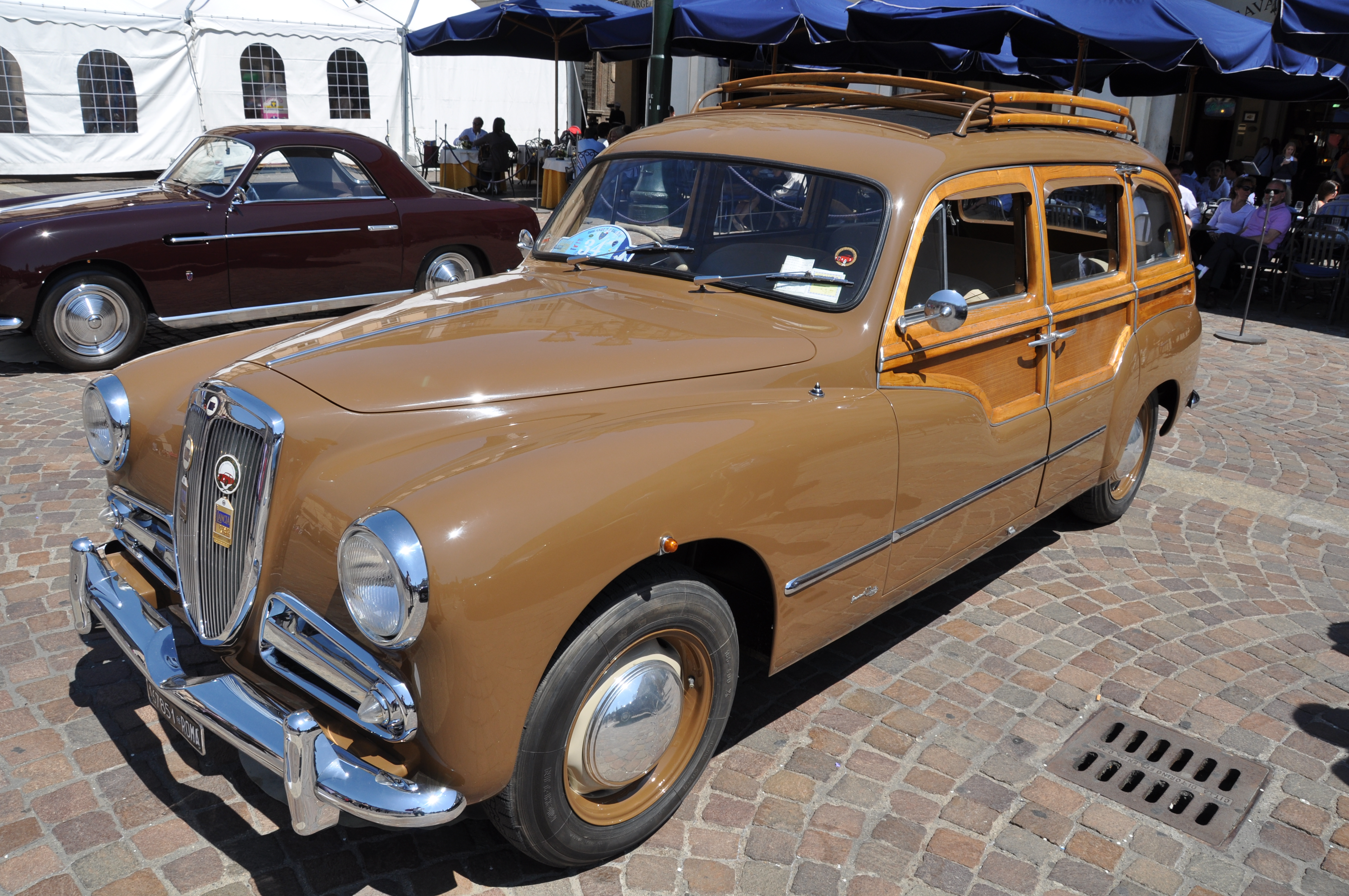
1952 Lancia Aurelia Viotti Giardinetta

The Carrozzeria Viotti was an Italian coachbuilding company active between 1921 and 1964. The company was founded in Turin, Italy by Vittorio Viotti. Designers like Frua and Mario Revelli worked for the company. It was the first coachbuilding company in Italy to set up a proper production line.

== History ==
In the mid-1920s Viotti and his partner Tolfo filed a patent for the "Clairalpax body" which was very successful for the excellent brightness of the passenger compartment. It was an innovation that involved the replacement of the massive wooden door-pillars, connecting the belt line and the soft top and supporting the windows of the cars, with thin nickel silver uprights that allowed a significant increase in the glass surfaces. Thanks to these earnings, in 1931 the company changed its name to "Carrozzeria Viotti SA" and moved to a larger warehouse in Corso Stupinigi to satisfy growing demand, using Fiat chassis.

In the mid-1930s Viotti also produced various special bodies on sports chassis designed by Mario Revelli of Beaumont. Two of the most important fruits of the collaboration between Viotti and Revelli date back to this period. One was the Fiat 525 SS, a two-tone spider based on Fiat's sportiest model of the period. The other was the Isotta Fraschini 8A S advertising Martini, an aerodynamic coupé designed for advertising purposes for the alcohol company, incorporating a large bottle of liquor in its design. Also on the basis of the Isotta Fraschini 8A S, Viotti created a blue convertible with red interior expressly for Gabriele d'Annunzio, a car still preserved today at the Vittoriale. At the outbreak of the second world war, the company dedicated itself to the construction of ambulances before their factory was destroyed by the allied bombing of Turin.

Immediately after the war, in 1946, the company moved to a new factory in Corso Bramante, also in Turin, and it was there that the company remained until it closed in 1964. The company is of great importance in the history of the automobile for having created the Fiat 1100 Giardinetta which marked the birth of the modern station wagon; this solution was then also replicated on Lancia and Alfa Romeo chassis. The station wagon based on Fiat 1100/1200, was baptised "Sleeping" with the possibility of folding the seats up to obtain a space for sleeping.

The last original small series creations were the Fiat 1300/1500 Giardinetta which did not have the success hoped for, also due to the fact that FIAT, a few months after the launch of the sedan, decided to produce its own family version of the model, producing it at a lower cost and thus limiting the production of Viotti station wagons to just 50 vehicles. At that point the production was divided between "gardener" and "metal station wagon", convertibles and elaborations of production cars. In fact, Viotti was slowly abandoning the construction of unique cars in order to dedicate itself, like other companies without their own chassis, to "Americanizing" production cars, such as the Fiat 600 and Lancia Appia, equipping them with chrome plating and other accessories in vogue at that time across the Atlantic.

After the death of Vittorio Viotti in 1956, the body shop was overwhelmed by the crisis that hit the manufacturers of derivative cars and closed its doors definitively in 1964.

== Rebirth ==
In 2012 the Chinese automobile manufacturer Zhejiang Jonway Automobile Co., Ltd. (former Jonway) acquired the trademark of the Carrozzeria Viotti and relaunched the company founding a new headquarters in Rivoli, Turin. The new company specializes in the design of hybrid vehicles and engineering of sports cars. Emanuele Bomboi was the head of the design. In 2014 Carrozzeria Viotti acquired the original American trademark of Willys, and together with the Italian Fabbrica Italiana Maggiora introduced, at the Bologna Motor Show, the Willys AW 380 Berlinetta, a concept car inspired by the original Willys Interlagos, assembled by Willys in Brazil under license of the Alpine A108. Later Jonway sold the Viotti name to Fabbrica Italiana Maggiora S.r.L.

== Cars by Viotti ==
- Fiat 525
- Alfa Romeo 1500
- Alfa Romeo 8C 2300 Coupè
- Lancia Dilambda
- Fiat 508 Balilla
- Fiat 1100 Giardinetta
- Lancia Aurelia B51 Giardinetta
- Fiat 600 Coupé
- Bristol 407
- Willys AW 380 Berlineta

== Notable designers ==
- Vittorio Viotti
- Pietro Frua
- Mario Revelli di Beaumont
- Giovanni Michelotti
