= Cayzer baronets of Gartmore (1904) =

Escutcheon of the Cayzer baronets of Gartmore

The Cayzer baronetcy, of Gartmore in the County of Perth, was created on 12 December 1904 for the businessman and Conservative politician Charles William Cayzer, who had made a fortune in the shipping business. Cayzer represented Barrow-in-Furness in the House of Commons.

The 3rd Baronet sat as a Conservative Member of Parliament for Chester in 1922.

== Cayzer baronets, of Gartmore (1904) ==
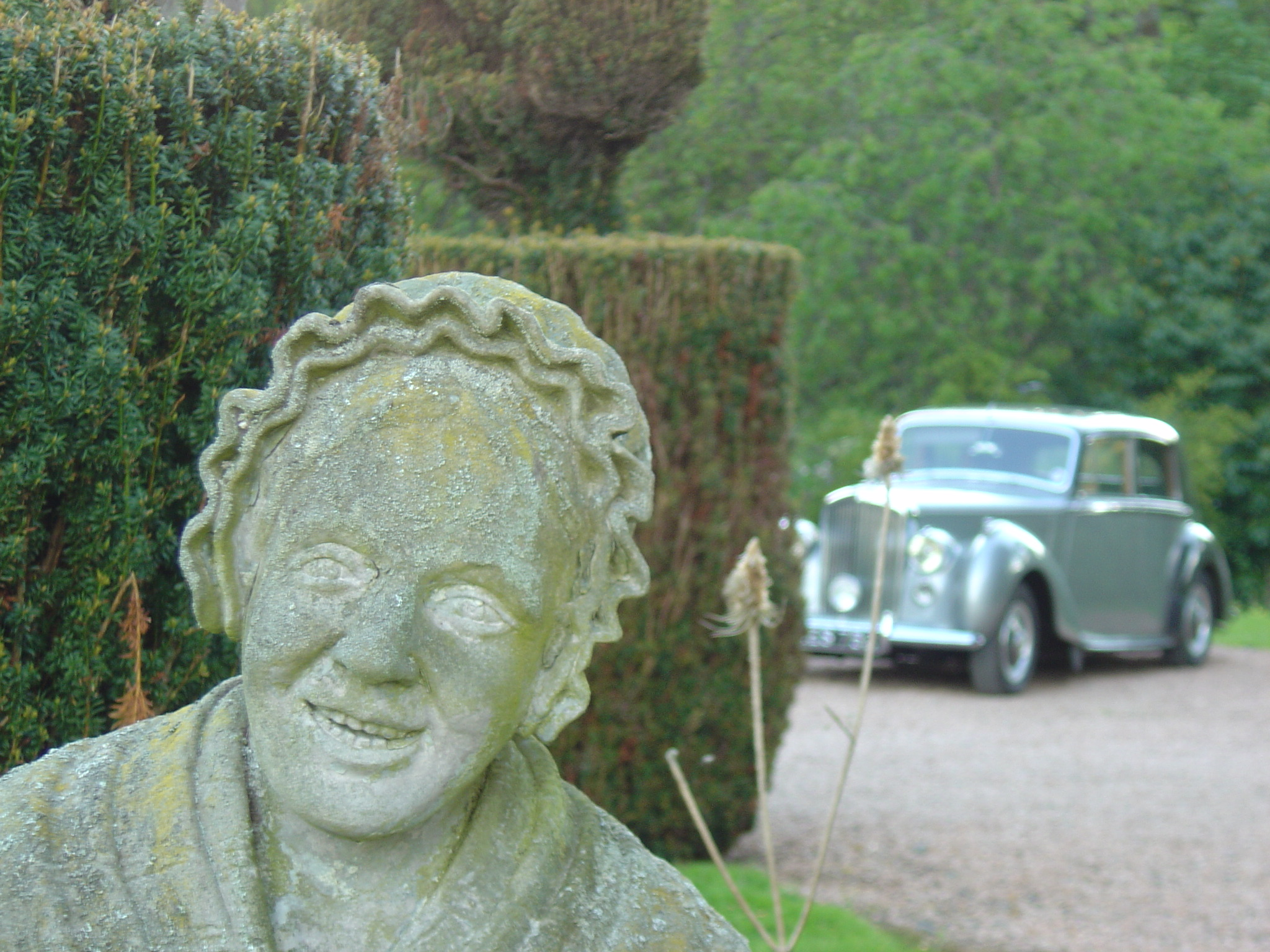
Statue of Robert Burns's Meg o' the Mill with one of Sir James Cayzer, 5th Baronet's Bentley cars behind, at Fingask Castle, Perthshire, 2004 photograph

- Sir Charles Cayzer, 1st Baronet (1843–1916)
- Sir Charles William Cayzer, 2nd Baronet (1869–1917)
- Sir Charles William Cayzer, 3rd Baronet (1896–1940)
- Sir Nigel John Cayzer, 4th Baronet (1920–1943)
- Sir James Arthur Cayzer, 5th Baronet (1931–2012)
- Sir (Herbert) Robin Cayzer, 3rd Baron Rotherwick, 6th Baronet (born 1954)

== Extended family ==
The First World War admirals Sir Charles Madden and Lord Jellicoe were the 1st Baronet's sons-in-law; the 2nd Earl Jellicoe was a grandson.

== Notes ==
Baronetage of the United Kingdom
Preceded by White baronets	Cayzer baronets of Gartmore; 12 December 1904	Succeeded by Flannery baronets
