= Chrysler A engine =

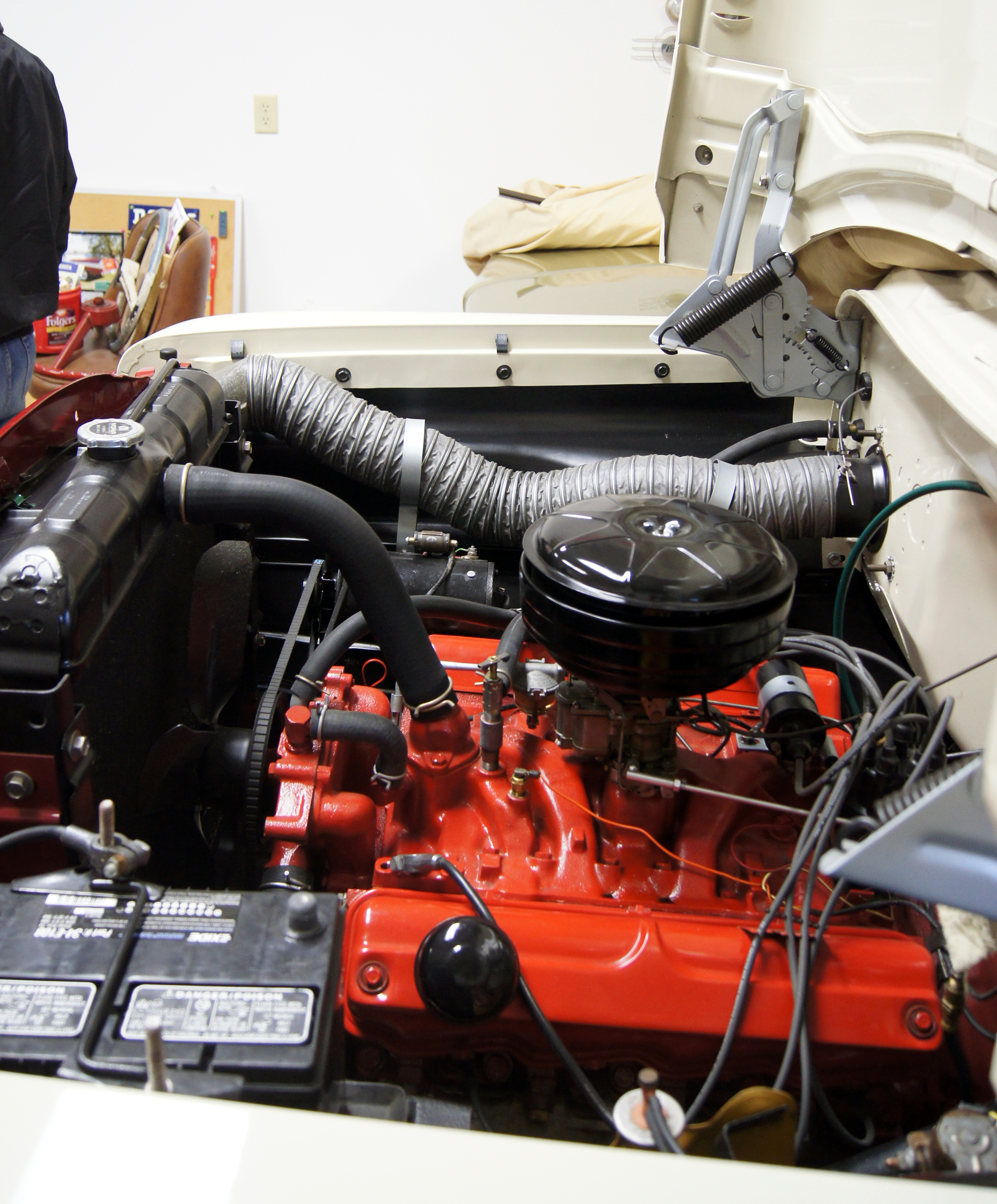

Overview
- Manufacturer: Chrysler
- Also called: Plymouth A engine
- Production: 1956-1961 Mound Road Engine, Detroit, MI

Layout
- Configuration: V8
- Displacement: 276.1 cu in (4.5 L); 299.6 cu in (4.9 L); 302.5 cu in (5.0 L); 312.5 cu in (5.1 L); 317.6 cu in (5.2 L); 325.2 cu in (5.3 L)
- Cylinder bore: 3 3/4 in (95.2 mm; 3.75 in); 3 13/16 in (96.8 mm; 3.81 in); 3 7/8 in (98.4 mm; 3.88 in); 3 29/32 in (99.2 mm; 3.91 in); 3 61/64 in (100 mm; 3.95 in)
- Piston stroke: 3 1/8 in (79.4 mm; 3.13 in); 3 5/16 in (84.1 mm; 3.31 in)
- Cylinder block material: Cast iron
- Cylinder head material: Cast iron
- Valvetrain: OHV 2 valves x cyl.

Combustion
- Fuel system: 4-barrel Carburetor
- Fuel type: Gasoline
- Oil system: Wet sump
- Cooling system: Water-cooled

Output
- Power output: 187–290 bhp (139–216 kW)

Chronology
- Predecessor: Polyspheric engines
- Successor: Chrysler LA engine

The Chrysler A engine is an OHV small-block V8 gasoline engine built by Chrysler from 1956 until 1967. It featured polyspherical combustion chambers, and was offered in displacements from 276.1 cu in (4.5 L) to 325.2 cu in (5.3 L), and in various high-power configurations. It began to be replaced by the wedge-head LA engine in 1964, and is not related to the hemispherical-head Hemi engine of the 1950s or 1960s.

The A engine was released in 1956, and was used exclusively in Plymouths until 1958 and in Chryslers and Dodges from 1959 on. The DeSoto and Dodge 270/315/325 poly used similar head architecture but was not related to the Plymouth A Engine, using its own heads and the same bottom end as the Dodge and Desoto Red Ram Hemi. The A engine cylinder bore center distance is 4.46 in (113.3 mm), larger than the earlier Dodge-based poly engines. The A engine formed the design basis of the Chrysler LA engine, evidenced in the many parts that interchange between the two engine families.

== Plymouth ==
=== 277 ===
The 277 "Hy-Fire" was the first A-block engine, produced for 1955 in the fall of 1954 and sharing almost nothing but the basic concepts with other engines built by Chrysler. Bore is 3 3/4 in (95.3 mm) and stroke is 3 1/8 in (79.4 mm; 3.13 in) for a piston displacement of 276.1 cu in (4,525 cc). It was replaced by the 301 in 1957, except for in low-priced Plaza models where it continued to be used during the 1957 model year. Power for the two-barrel version is 187 hp (139 kW); this increased to 200 hp (149 kW) for the four-barrel "Power Pack" version which also came equipped with dual exhausts. The Power Pack was also fitted to the Facel Vega FV3, of which 48 examples were built in 1956 and 1957.

=== 301 ===
The Plymouth 301 replaced the 277 in 1957 and kept that engine's 3.125 in (79.4 mm) stroke. Its piston displacement is 299.6 cu in (4,910 cc), thanks to the larger 3 29/32 in (99.2 mm; 3.91 in) bore. These dimensions are entirely different from the 1955 Chrysler 301. This engine was also installed in the 1957–1958 Facel Vega FV3B.

=== 303 ===
The 1956 Plymouth 303 displaces 302.5 cu in (4,957 cc) and uses the same connecting rods as the 277; the bore is 3 13/16 in (96.8 mm; 3.81 in) and the stroke is 3 5/16 in (84.1 mm; 3.31 in).

This engine was used in the following vehicles:

- 1956 Dodge Custom Royal (Canadian)
- 1956 Chrysler Windsor (Canadian)
- 1956 Plymouth Fury, 240 bhp (179 kW) with 4-barrel carburetor
- 1957 standard on all 118 in (3,000 mm)-wheelbase Dodges and Plymouths

=== 313 ===
A 313 cu in (5,121 cc) version of the A engine called the 313 was produced from 1957 to 1967 primarily for Canadian and export markets. This engine has a bore of 3.875 in (98.4 mm) and the common 3.3125 in (84.1 mm) stroke, and was used in the following vehicles, amongst others:

- 1957 Canadian Dodge Custom Royal
- 1957–1964 Australian Chrysler Royal
- 1958–1967 standard or available in all Canadian-market Dodges and Plymouths except Valiants, Barracudas, and Darts.
- 1961–1963 Bristol 407
- 1963–1965 Bristol 408 Mark I

=== 318 ===
The 318 is the most common version of the A engine, produced from 1957 through 1966 in the US and 1967 in some export markets when it was replaced in all markets by the LA 318. Only Plymouth used this 318 in 1957 and 1958, but it was shared with Chrysler from 1959 on and Dodge from 1960 on. It displaces 317.6 cu in (5,204 cc) from a 3 29/32 in (99.22 mm; 3.906 in) bore and the 3 5/16 in (84.14 mm; 3.312 in) stroke.

A high-performance version called the V-800, offered in 1957 and 1958, used two four-barrel Carter carburetors to produce 290 hp (216 kW), making it the highest-output factory A engine. It was used in the 1957 and 1958 Plymouth Fury, but was also an option on Plymouth models lower in the model range.

Bristol Cars introduced the 318 in the Mark II model of their 408 (in 1965) and continued to use it in the succeeding 409 and 410 until 1969. From 1962 until early 1965, Checker used this engine for their Aerobus limousines.

== Non-Plymouth ==
=== 326 ===
The 326 was launched in 1959 Dodges. Its actual piston displacement is 325.25 cu in (5,330 cc) but it was marketed as a 326 to avoid confusion with the Dodge Red Ram 325. The 326 uses the same 3 5/16 in (84.1 mm) stroke as the 318, but with the largest bore of any A engine at 3 61/64 in (100 mm; 3.95 in). It uses hydraulic valve lifters, unlike the other A engines that used solid lifters, and was used in the 1959 Dodge Coronet.
