= Bristol 408 =

- 1964 Bristol 408 (Mark I)

Overview
- Manufacturer: Bristol Cars
- Production: 1963–1966; 83 units
- Assembly: United Kingdom: Filton

Body and chassis
- Class: Sports saloon
- Layout: FR layout

Powertrain
- Engine: 5.1 L Chrysler A V8; 5.2 L Chrysler A V8
- Transmission: 3-speed automatic

Dimensions
- Wheelbase: 2,896 mm (114.0 in)
- Length: 4,915 mm (193.5 in)
- Width: 1,727 mm (68.0 in)
- Curb weight: 1,600 kg (3,527 lb)

Chronology
- Predecessor: Bristol 407
- Successor: Bristol 409

The Bristol 408 is a British luxury car made by Bristol Cars between 1963 and 1966. Unusually for Bristol, a slightly revised version was launched during the middle of the model's production run in 1965 and known as the 408 Mark II.

== History ==
Mechanically the Bristol 408 was identical to is predecessor the 407, which had been a major departure for Bristol with its use of a Chrysler V8 engine and automatic transmission. However, outwardly there were some major changes. The frontal styling of the 407 – which had been a carry-over from the six-cylinder 406 – was discarded and in its place was a rectangular grille with pronounced horizontal bars. Another major change were the turn indicator lamps, which on the 408 were wide and rectangular in contrast to the 407's round lamps.

The dashboard of a 408 Mark I

Rear view

== 408 Mark II ==
Due to safety concerns, the push-button layout of the automatic transmission was modified through the use of a safety lever to prevent an unwary person moving the car out of "Park". There were also rectangular instead of circular push-buttons for the gear selector in this version of the car. The transmission itself was now of cast alloy and was over 30 kg (66 lb) lighter than that of previous eight-cylinder Bristols.

The engine of the 407 and the original 408 had a capacity of 5.1 L (5,121 cc; 313 cu in), but for the 408 Mark II this was changed to the newer, 5.2 L (5,204 cc; 318 cu in) variant.
