= Flannery baronets =

Extinct baronetcy in the Baronetage of the United Kingdom

Escutcheon of the Flannery baronets

The Flannery baronetcy, of Wethersfield Manor in the County of Essex, was a title in the Baronetage of the United Kingdom. It was created on 13 December 1904 for the engineer, naval architect and politician Sir James Fortescue Flannery. The title became extinct on the death of the 2nd Baronet in 1959.

== Flannery baronets, of Wethersfield Manor (1904) ==
- Sir James Fortescue-Flannery, 1st Baronet (1851–1943)
- Sir Harold Fortescue Flannery, 2nd Baronet (1883–1959), did not leave an heir.

Baronetage of the United Kingdom
Preceded by Cayzer baronets	Flannery baronets of Wethersfield Manor; 13 December 1904	Succeeded by Boyle baronets
