= Overfinch =

English business customising Land and Range Rovers

- Founded: 1975
- Headquarters: Leeds, England
- Number of locations: 2
- Services: Bespoke builds and vehicle enhancements
- Website: www.overfinch.com

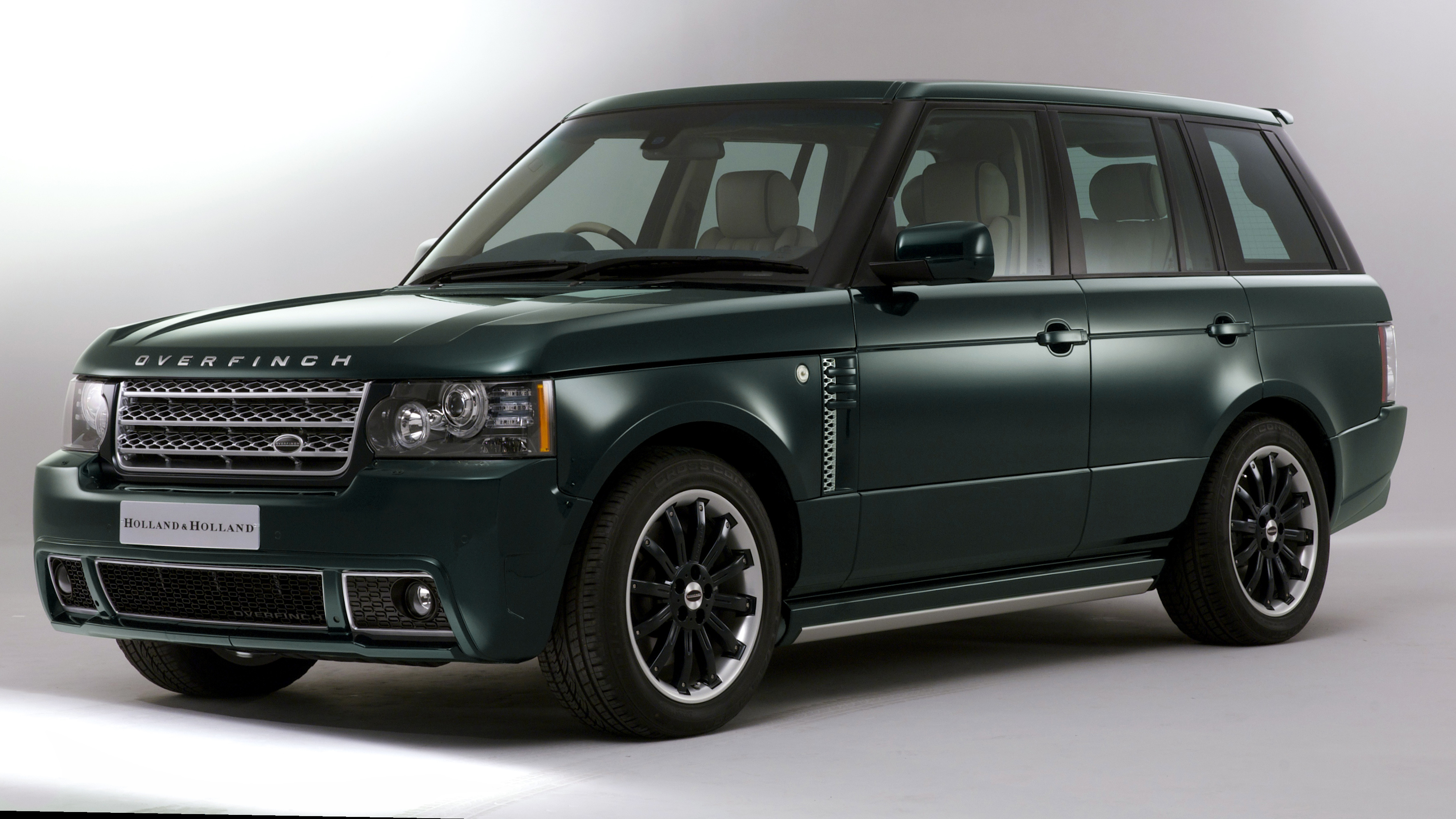
The Holland & Holland Overfinch

Overfinch is a British company that customises Land Rover and Range Rover cars. Based in Leeds, England, it won the 2015 Ford "Special Recognition for Outstanding Achievement in Design" award for the SuperSport styling package.

== Models ==
Models have included the Overfinch 580 S, the 2010 Overfinch Vogue GT (based on Range Rover), Overfinch SuperSport (based on the Range Rover Sport), and Holland & Holland Overfinch.

== History ==
=== The Shuler Press years ===
Arthur Silverton established Overfinch Bespoke Vehicles in 1975, in Sunninghill, Berkshire, under the name Schuler Presses. Initially, Silverton fixed what he perceived as imperfections inherent in the Land Rover's design. Silverton experimented with swapping the vehicle's Rover Engine for 4.4 V8 engines and a Jaguar V12, before settling on General Motors' 5.7 GM V8. Improvements were made to the vehicle's handling and Silverton installed a Ferguson FF anti-skid brake system. He also modified the interior to include pile carpets, leather upholstery, and air conditioning. Silverton changed the company name to Overfinch in 1985 and positioned the company as the de facto post-production modifier of Range Rovers. Douglas Cooke bought the company in the late 1980's.

=== Administration ===
In November 2010, the company was placed into administration, under the control of administrators Wilson Field, who said the business had incurred significant one-off non-trading costs which hit cash flow. Autobrokers Ltd of Leeds, who had been the company's largest retailer, using the name Overfinch Leeds, acquired the business and assets.

Throughout the 2010s, other luxury car makers such as Rolls-Royce, Bentley, and Lamborghini entered the luxury SUV market. Overfinch competed with these brands by positioning itself as an exclusive luxury alternative. Under their new CEO, Kevin Sloane, the decade saw the company enter the U.S. SUV market.

== See also ==
- Automotive aftermarket
- Car tuning
- Custom car
- List of Auto tuning companies
