= White baronets of Cotham House (1904) =

Escutcheon of the White baronets of Cotham House

The White baronetcy, of Cotham House in the City and County of Bristol, was created in the Baronetage of the United Kingdom on 26 August 1904 for George White, owner of Bristol Tramways and Carriage Company, and the founder of the Bristol Aeroplane Company.

== White baronets, of Cotham House (1904) ==
- Sir George White, 1st Baronet (1854–1916), founder of the Bristol Aeroplane Co.
- Sir (George) Stanley White, 2nd Baronet (1882–1964), co-founder of the Bristol Aeroplane Co.
- Sir George Stanley Midelton White, 3rd Baronet (1913–1983)
- Sir George Stanley James White, 4th Baronet (born 1948)

The 4th Baronet's heir apparent is (George) Philip James White (born 1987).

== Notes ==
Baronetage of the United Kingdom
Preceded by Palmer baronets	White baronets of Cotham House; 26 August 1904	Succeeded by Cayzer baronets
