= Bristol 404 and 405 =

Bristol 404 Bristol 405
- Bristol 405 4-door saloon

Overview
- Manufacturer: Bristol Cars (then Bristol Aeroplane Co.)
- Production: 1953–1958; 404: 52 units; 405: 308 units
- Assembly: United Kingdom: Filton

Body and chassis
- Class: Luxury car
- Body style: 2-door coupé (404); 2-door drophead coupé (405); 4-door saloon (405)
- Layout: FR layout

Powertrain
- Engine: 1,971 cc OHV I6; 2,216 cc OHV I6
- Transmission: 4-speed manual

Chronology
- Predecessor: Bristol 403
- Successor: Bristol 406

"In this latest product from Bristol Cars Ltd, I am in the happy position of having very little with which to find fault"

Bill Boddy in Motor Sport, February 1956

"One starts to throw this car into corners after a very few miles of motoring. The high geared steering responds to a single quick turn of the two spoke wheel, and the 405 goes round, as uncompromisingly upright as a Calvinist pastor ... "

Mike Brown in The Autocar, May 1955

The Bristol 404 and Bristol 405 are British luxury cars which were manufactured by the Bristol Aeroplane Company. The 404 was manufactured from 1953 to 1958, and the 405 from 1955 to 1958. The models were successors to the Bristol 403. The 404 was a two-seat coupé and the 405 was available as a four-seat, four-door saloon and as a four-seat, two-door drophead coupé.

Unlike previous or later Bristol models, there is considerable confusion in nomenclature when it comes to the Bristol 404 and 405. The 404 was a very short-wheelbase car introduced in 1953, whereas the longer 405 was introduced in 1955. The wheelbases are 8 feet (2,438 mm) for the 404 and 9 feet 6 inches (2,896 mm) for the 405.

== Design ==
The 405 itself was seen in two versions. The more common (265 of 308 built) is a four-door saloon built on the standard chassis of the previous Bristols, whilst the 405 drophead coupé or 405D (43 built) had a convertible body by Abbotts of Farnham. The body used aluminium panels over a steel and ash frame, mounted on a substantial horse-shoe shaped chassis. Most cars built had a highly tuned (through advanced valve timing) version of the 2 litre six-cylinder engine called the 100C which developed 125 bhp (93 kW) as against the 105 bhp (78 kW) of the standard 100B 405 engine. Even the 105 bhp engine was fitted with Solex triple downdraft carburettors. With UK fuel supplies no longer restricted to the low-octane wartime "pool petrol", all engines for the 404 and 405 came with higher compression ratios than predecessor Bristols – 8.5:1 as against 7.5:1. Rack and pinion steering was fitted and the car's handling won accolades from press reports when the car was introduced (and subsequently).

Compared to the 403, the 404 and 405 had an improved gearbox with much shorter gear lever, which improved what was already by the standards of the day a very slick gearchange. The 405, though not the 404, had overdrive as standard apart from the earliest models, and front disc brakes became an option apart from the earliest models, and were fitted to almost all 405 drophead coupés. A few late 405s were fitted with the higher torque 2.2 litre engine introduced in the later 406.

Externally, a notable feature of the 404 and 405 was the abandonment of the BMW-style radiator grille for one much more like an aero-engine. The 405, although the only four-door car ever built by Bristol, had styling that the company was later to refine for many years on their later Chrysler V8-engined cars during the 1960s. It was also the model that introduced the Bristol feature of sizable lockers in the front wings accessed externally by gullwing doors. The locker on the nearside held the spare wheel and jack, whilst that on the offside housed the battery and fuse panel.

1953 Bristol 404 2-door coupé

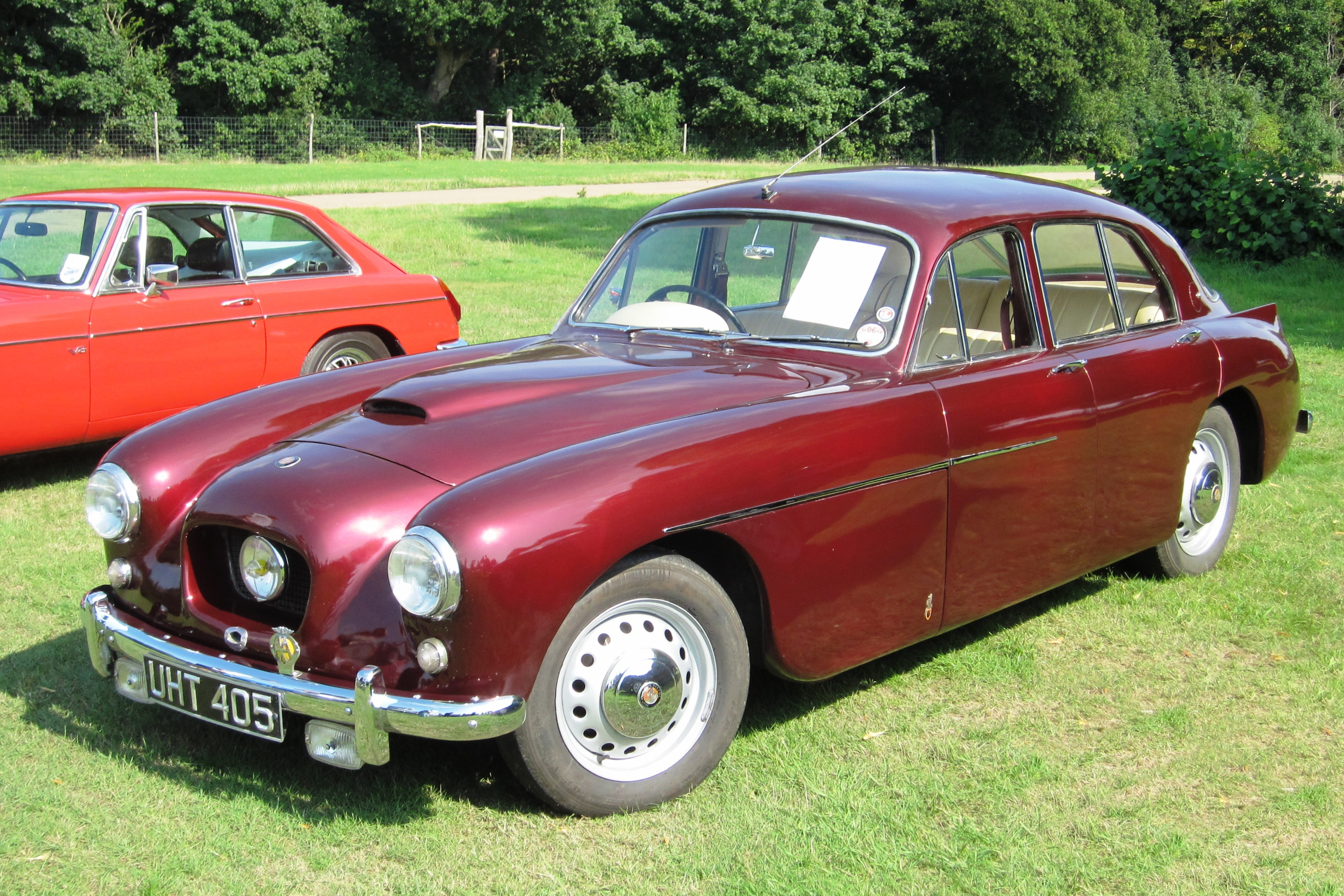
Bristol 405 four-door saloon

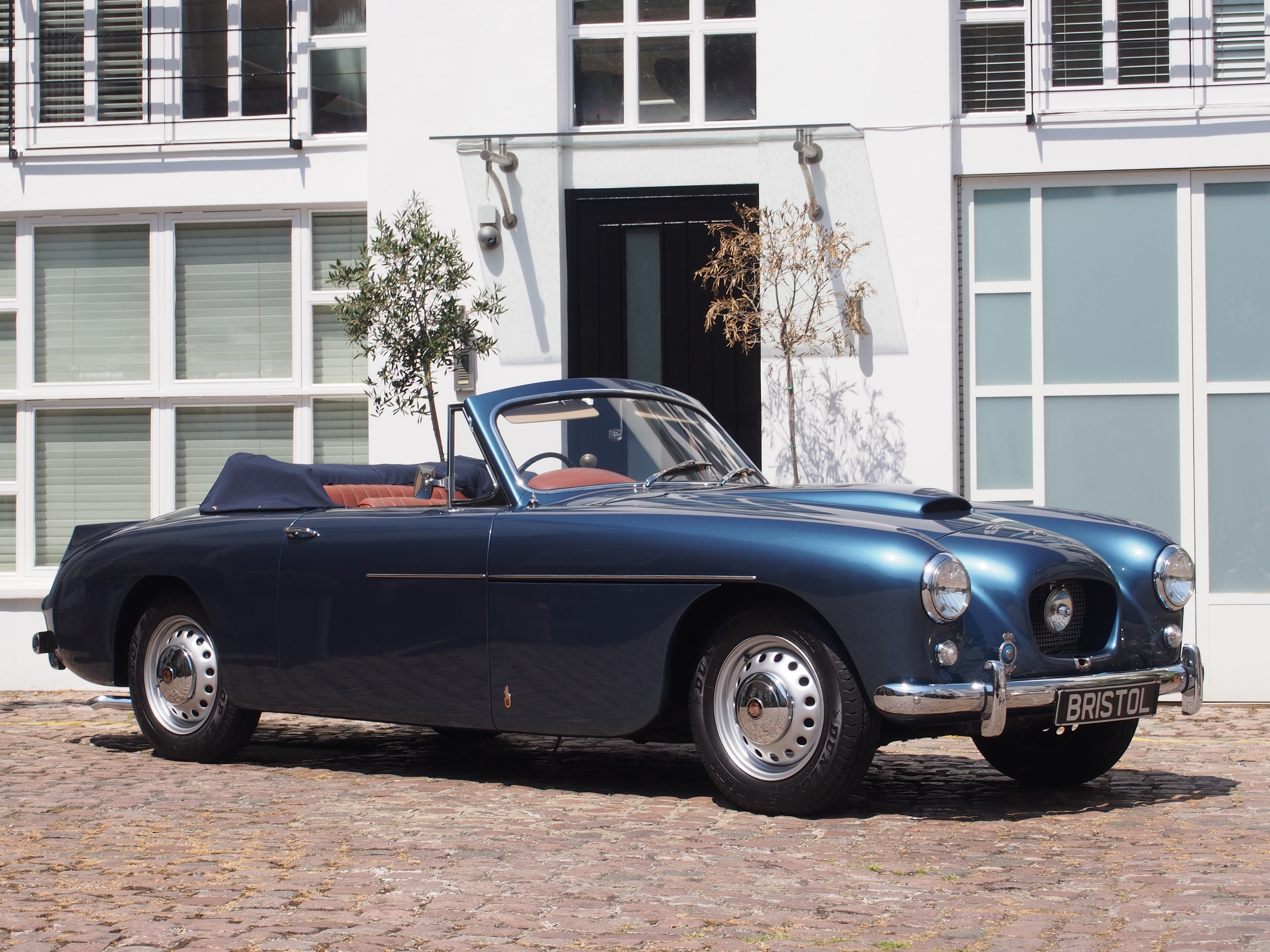
Bristol 405 four-seater drophead coupé

== Media appearances ==
In the 1955 comedy film Josephine and Men, one of the main characters, Alan, played by Donald Sinden, drives a maroon 405.

A maroon 405, registration TEL 808 appears prominently in the music video for Swing Out Sister "Forever Blue" (1989).

A silver 405, described as a 1955 Bristol, is driven by the character Jack Kerruish (played by Kevin Whately) in the first three series of Peak Practice, set in the early 1990s in the Peak District.

A maroon 405 is featured prominently in the 2009 independent film An Education, directed by Lone Scherfig, which is a period film set in 1961 in the London suburbs.

The vicar, Sidney Chambers (played by James Norton), was given a lift in a maroon 405, at the beginning of Grantchester, series 3, episode 5 (2017).

Daniel Day-Lewis is featured driving a maroon 405 around Whitby, North Yorkshire, in the film Phantom Thread, directed by Paul Thomas Anderson and released on Christmas Day 2017.

In the 2017 Sony Pictures film adaptation of Agatha Christie's Crooked House, private detective Charles Hayward (Max Irons) uses a maroon 405.
