= Trans-Am production cars =

American factory-built pony cars

Trans-Am production cars were factory-built pony cars based on vehicles raced in the Sports Car Club of America Trans-Am Series. These cars were used largely for homologation purposes but also as promotional tools for the series. The first Trans-Am street car was Chevrolet's Z/28 Camaro, which entered production in 1967. By 1970, six makes were producing street cars based on their racing vehicles. Due to their low production numbers and high performance, these vehicles are highly collectible today.

== History ==
The Trans-Am Series began in 1966, with the first race being held on 25 March at Sebring International Raceway. The series consisted of two classes: over 2 litres and under 2 litres. Between 1966 and 1972, Ford, Mercury, Chevrolet, Pontiac, Dodge, Plymouth, and American Motors all participated in the series at various times.

== Makes ==
Listed below are the street cars based on racing vehicles in the Trans-Am Series.

=== Chevrolet Z/28 Camaro ===
The Chevrolet Camaro was released in 1967, three years after the Ford Mustang. In its first year, the Camaro could be ordered with RPO Z/28, which included a small block-series 302 cubic inch motor with 11.0:1 compression. For the 1970 model year the Z/28 engine was changed to the 350 cubic inch LT-1.

1967	602
1968	7,199
1969	20,302
1970	8,733

=== Pontiac Trans-Am Firebird ===
The Pontiac Firebird went into production contemporaneously and on the same platform as the Camaro. Pontiac entered the Trans-Am Series in 1968 and, a year later introduced the Trans-Am Firebird for public purchase. This option came with Pontiac's small journal-series 400 cubic inch engine, which did not qualify for homologation.

1969	697
1970	3,196

=== Ford Boss 302 Mustang ===
The Ford Mustang was the first "pony car," introduced mid-year in 1964. Ford had participated in Trans-Am since its first season in 1966. In 1969 and 1970 Ford produced the Boss 302, a replica of their Trans-Am race cars. This car featured Ford's Boss 302, which was a standard 302 Ford Windsor engine fitted with 351 Cleveland cylinder heads.

1969	1,628
1970	7,013

=== Mercury Boss 302 Cougar Eliminator ===
Mercury released its pony car, the Cougar, in 1967. Although Mercury only participated in the 1967 Trans-Am season, the company offered the Boss 302 motor in the 1969 and 1970 model years.

1969	169
1970	469

=== Plymouth AAR 'Cuda ===
The Plymouth 'Cuda began its life in 1964 as the compact Barracuda, built on Chrysler's A Platform. In the inaugural season of Trans-Am racing, the Barracuda was a participant. In 1970, Chrysler introduced its first pony cars, the Plymouth 'Cuda and Dodge Challenger, built on the new E Platform. In their first year both of the new vehicles participated in Trans-Am. The AAR 'Cuda was named after driver Dan Gurney's team, the "All American Racers," and featured the 340 cubic inch LA-series engine with three 2-barrel carburetors and matte-black fiberglass forced-air induction hood.

1970	2,724

=== Dodge Challenger T/A ===
In 1970 Chrysler introduced its own pony cars, the Plymouth 'Cuda and Dodge Challenger, both built on the new E Platform. Both of these cars participated in the 1970 Trans-Am season. Like the AAR 'Cuda, the Challenger T/A "Six Pack" came with the same 340 cubic inch motor with three 2-barrel carburetors and a matte black fiberglass hood with forced air induction.

1970	2,399

=== AMC Mark Donohue Signature SST Javelin ===
The American Motors Javelin was introduced for the 1968 model year, and participated in the Trans-Am series that year as well. In 1970, AMC signed Roger Penske and Mark Donohue to its team. AMC won the Trans-Am Series in both 1971 and 1972, the final years of Trans-Am's "golden age." In 1970 the Donohue Javelin was introduced for public purchase. This car featured AMC's Gen 3-series 304, 360, or 390 cubic inch motor. AMC also produced a T/A Javelin in 1970. This version of the car was painted in the racing team's red-white-blue colour scheme and was used for promotional purposes. Only 100 were built.

1970	2,501
