= Bristol Type 603 =

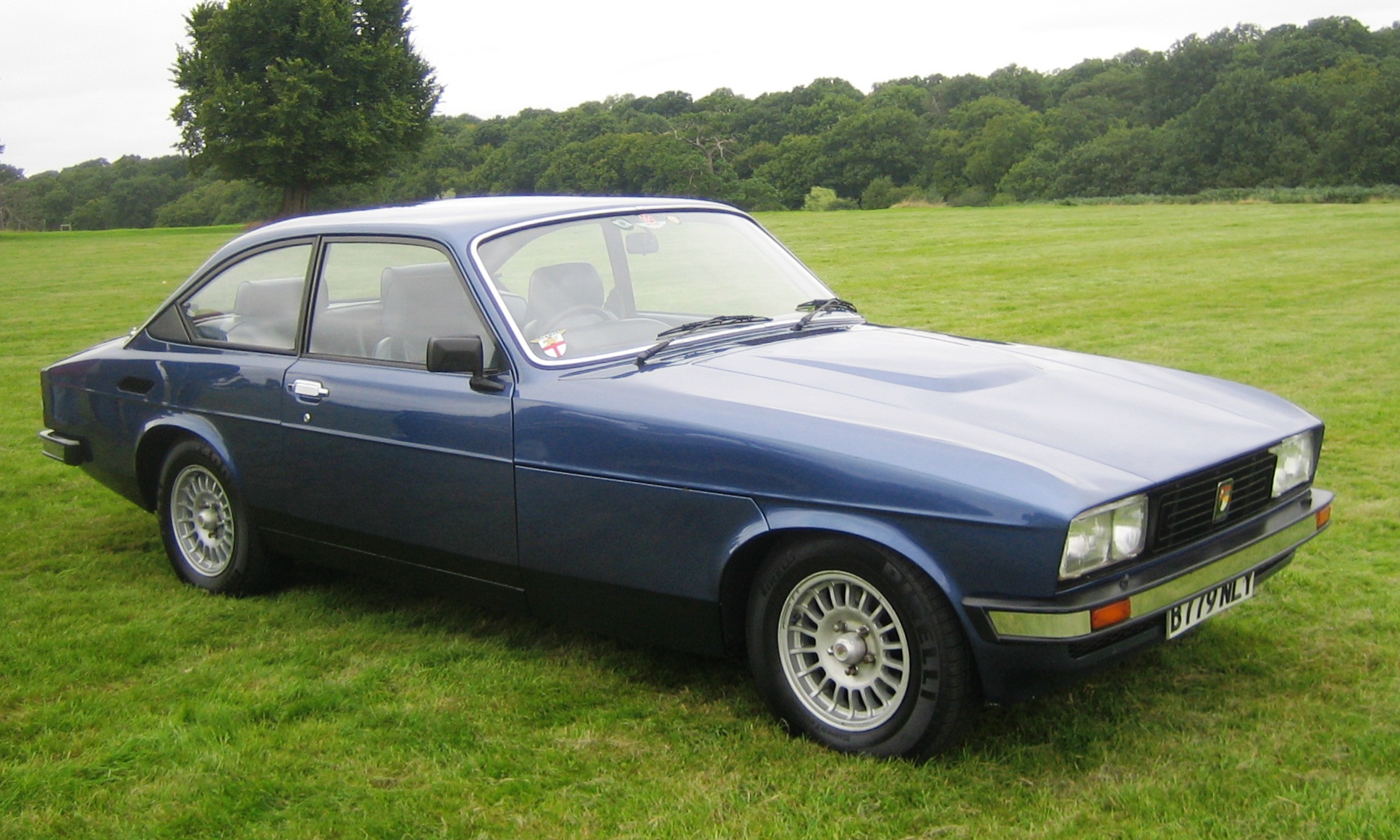
- Bristol Brigand

Overview
- Manufacturer: Bristol Cars
- Production: 1976–2011
- Assembly: United Kingdom: Filton
- Designer: Dudley Hobbs

Body and chassis
- Body style: 2-door saloon
- Layout: FR layout
- Related: Bristol 412

Powertrain
- Engine: 5.2 L Chrysler 318 V8; 5.9 L Chrysler 360 V8; 5.9 L Chrysler Magnum V8
- Transmission: 3-speed automatic 4-speed automatic (from Blenheim)

Dimensions
- Length: 4,910 mm (193 in)
- Width: 1,770 mm (70 in)
- Height: 1,440 mm (57 in)

Chronology
- Predecessor: Bristol 411

The Bristol Type 603 is a car that was launched in 1976 by British manufacturer Bristol Cars to replace the 411. With the 603 – introduced along with the Zagato-built 412 – the Bristol car underwent its first major facelift since the introduction of the 406 in the late 1950s. The design was to last until the marque's demise in 2011. Bristol's chief designer Dudley Hobbs strove to make the car more spacious and aerodynamic, while also using flatter body panels that would be easier to hammer.

== 603 ==
The classic three-box two-door saloon was replaced by a considerably more streamlined design with a much larger and more curved rear window. The manufacturer pointed out that the new car had more head, leg, and shoulder room than any previous Bristol. The outdated style of door handle was updated.

The original 603 was offered in two versions, largely owing to the energy crisis which increased fuel prices to the point that it impacted even those who could afford such expensive cars. The 603E had the economy specification 5,211 cc V8 petrol engine, designated E44, producing 150 bhp (112 kW) and 260 lb⋅ft (353 N⋅m) of torque, whereas the 603S had the larger 5.9-litre unit, high-performance, 225 bhp (168 kW) and 280 lb⋅ft (380 N⋅m) of torque E58 specification engine, both from Chrysler.

The 603 saw improvements over previous models in its fuel consumption, being able to achieve as much as 22 mpg_{‑imp} (13 L/100 km; 18 mpg_{‑US}) at around 100 km/h (62 mph) compared with the 411's 17 mpg_{‑imp} (17 L/100 km; 14 mpg_{‑US}) – for comparison, as good as the Jaguar XJS. The reduction in fuel consumption was due to the use of the smaller engine and the new body being considerably more aerodynamic than the car it replaced. Both retained the same transmission and suspension as the 411, but the cabin had become more luxurious with the provision of electrically adjustable seats and air conditioning.

== 603 S2 ==
As the energy crisis eased, all Bristols, including the 412 series 2, received the high performance version of the 5.9-litre Chrysler unit that was to be used for all subsequent editions of the car. This model is called the 603 S2 and became available in early 1978. Another change was that the headlamp clusters were set in a new grille. The 5.2-litre engine continued to be available in the 603E specification.

The Bristol Owners Club (BOC) website lists a total of 61 603s, of both series and types.

== Britannia and Brigand (603 S3) ==
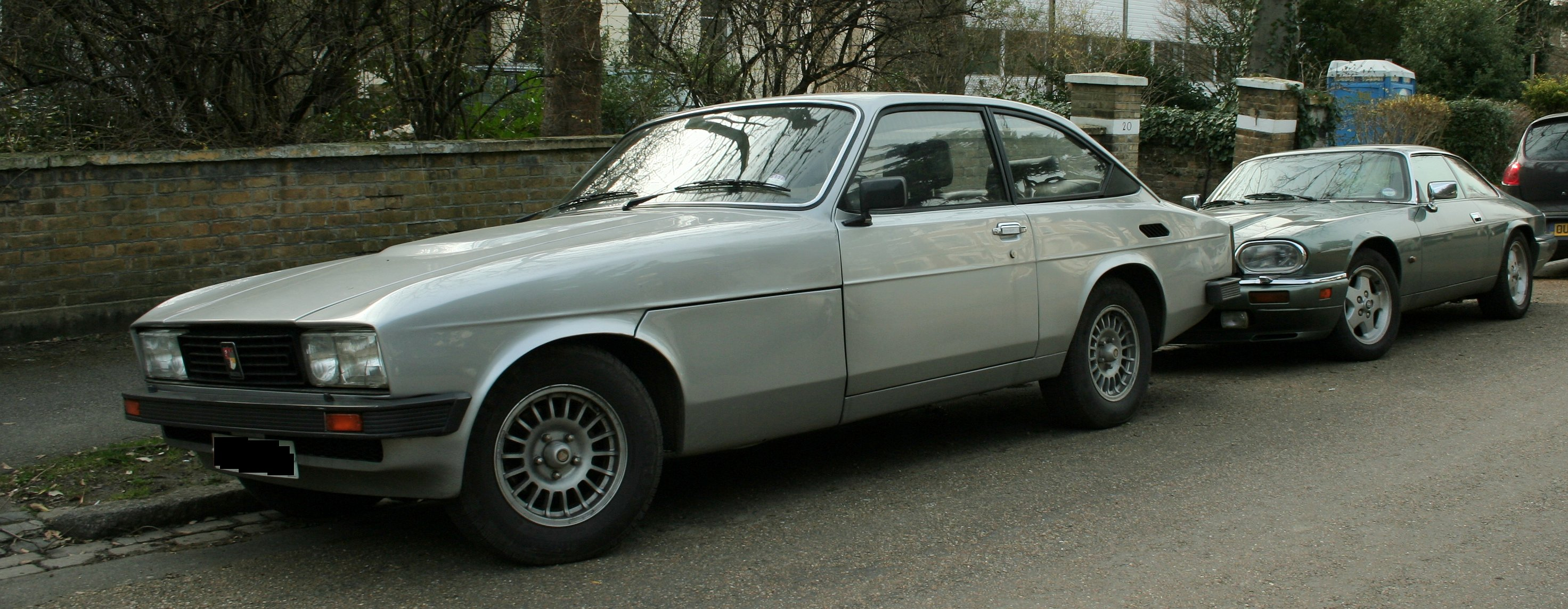
Bristol Brigand

The third series of 603, introduced in 1982 and continuing until 1994, saw Bristol adopt for the first time the names of the famous Bristol Aeroplane Company models for its cars. With this series of 603, there was a smaller radiator grille and more modern rear vision mirrors. The headlamps were the rectangular units from the Volkswagen Scirocco II. The tail-lights, borrowed from the Bedford CF2 van, were also mounted directly vertically, whereas on previous versions of the 603 the reversing lights were separate from the rear turn indicators and brake lights.

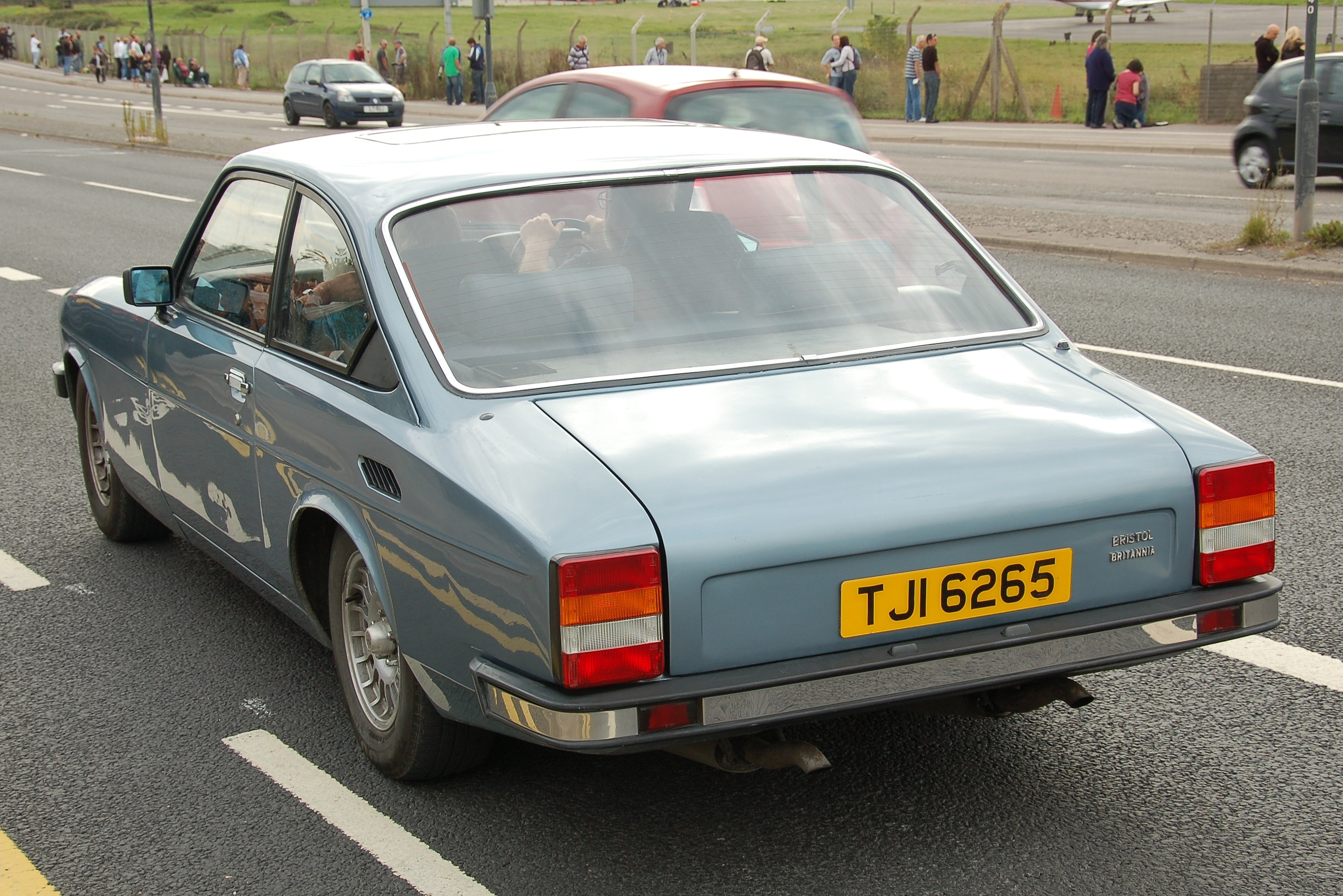
Bristol Britannia; rear view

The Bristol Britannia was the standard version, whilst the Bristol Brigand had a Rotomaster turbocharger added to the Chrysler V8 engine and a torque converter originally used on the 440 V8 to cope with the extra performance, which saw the Brigand capable of a gearing limited 150 mph (241 km/h). The Brigand could be distinguished from the Britannia by the bulge in the bonnet needed to accommodate the turbocharger, and also had alloy wheels as standard equipment.

There were a number of minor changes to the appearance of both models during their 12-year production run, especially at the front.

The Bristol Owners Club (BOC) website lists 19 Brigands and 16 Britannias.

== Blenheim (603 S4) ==
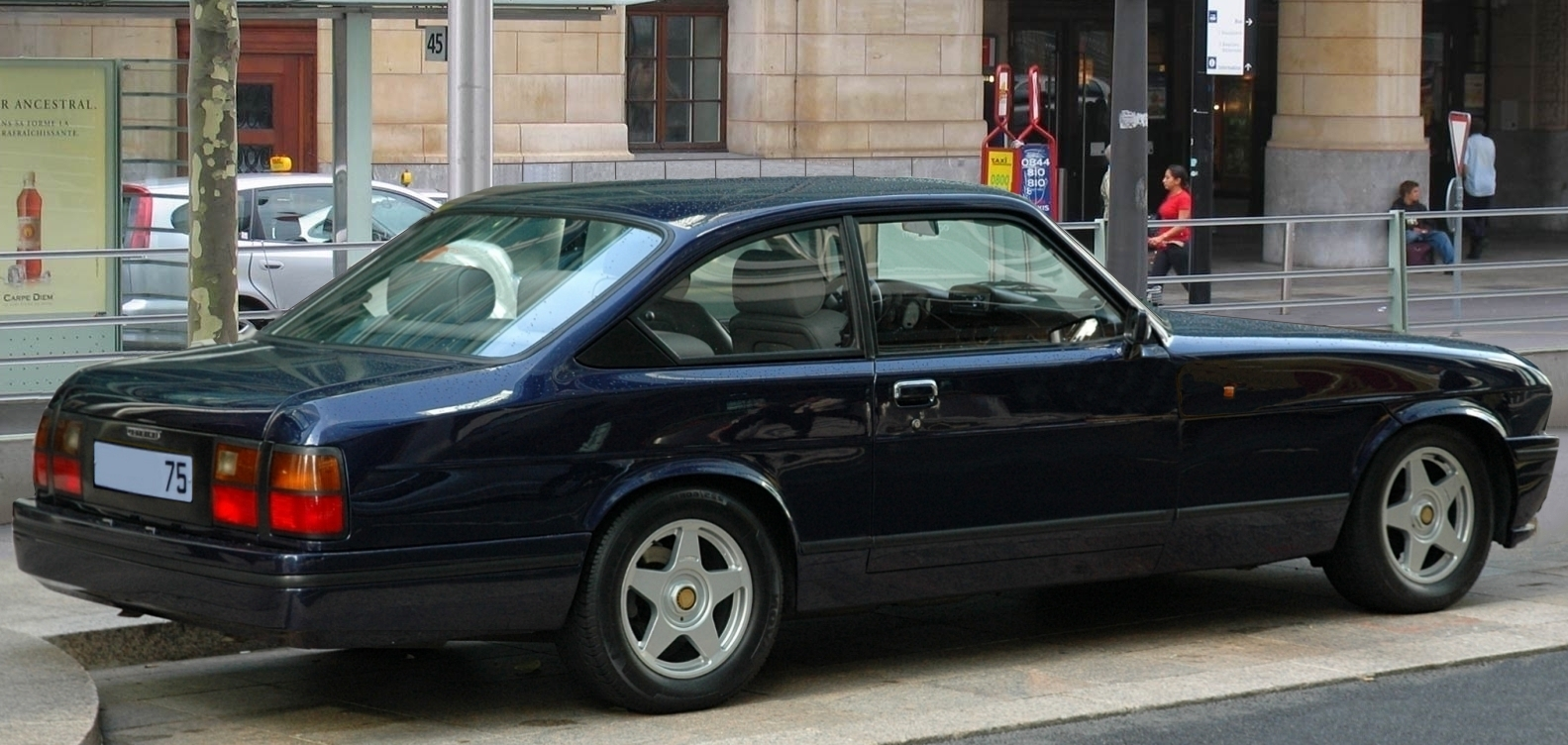
Bristol Blenheim 3S, showing the Opel Senator B taillights

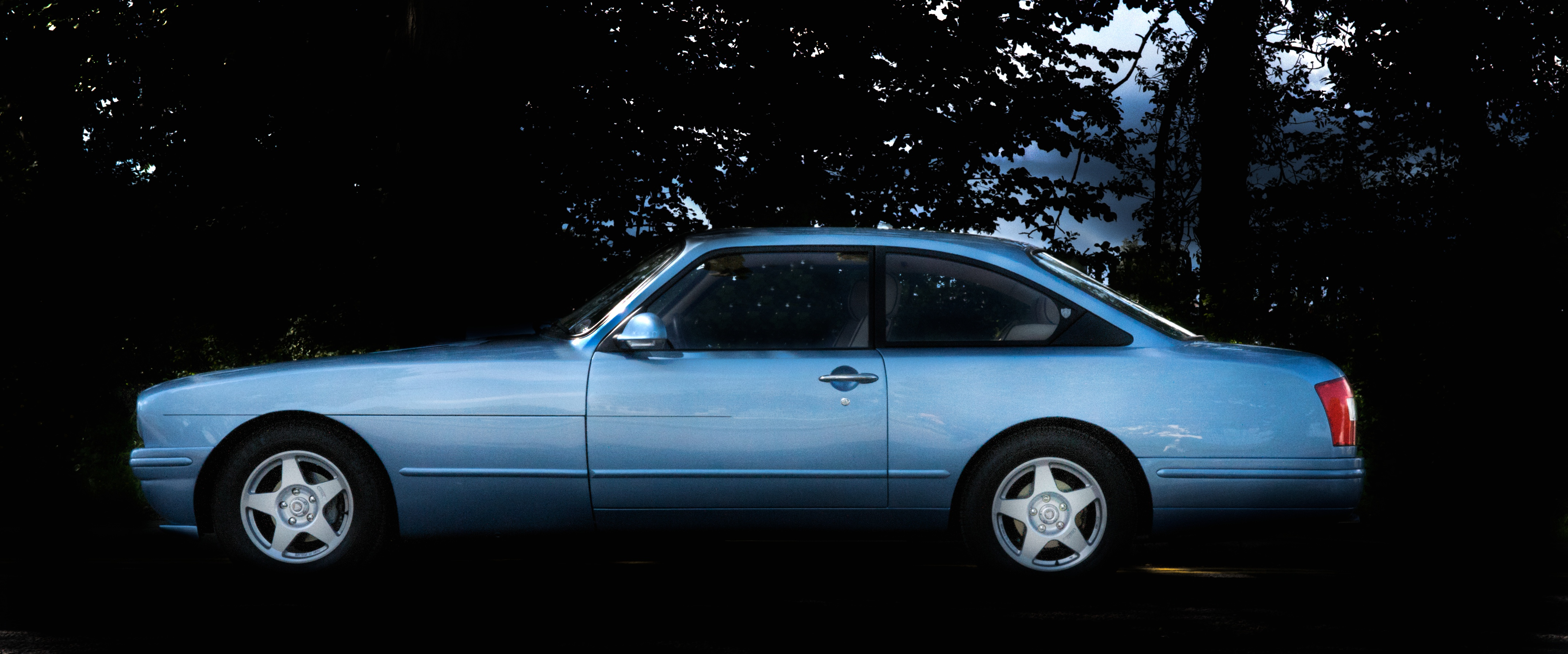
Bristol Blenheim 4S/G

With the Blenheim, Bristol further refined the 603, in particular modernising the mechanicals of the car through the introduction of the multi-port fuel injection, Chrysler Magnum engine, which improved both performance and fuel consumption. Turbocharging was no longer available, but the Blenheim Series 1 was claimed to have similar levels of performance as the Brigand, although in reality, it was closer to the Britannia. The car also benefitted from the fitment of a four-speed overdrive lock-up automatic transmission, which greatly contributed to the improved fuel consumption.

There was a significant change in frontal and rear-end styling with the introduction of the Blenheim. The headlights were paired and mounted considerably inboard from the extreme front of the car. The bonnet was also modified with the fitting of gas struts to hold it up when open for the first time, and featured a fully rectangular hinge for the first time in Bristol's history. At the rear saw the abandonment of the vertically mounted Bedford tail-lights in favor of the split units from the Opel Senator B.

Since that time the Blenheim has gone through two additional series, the Bristol Blenheim Series 2, made from January 1998 to the end of 1999. Bristol also responded to complaints about lacking power and reworked the engine, which was increased by 50 horsepower and now produced approximately 275 hp (205 kW) at 4700 rpm. The uplift in power provided the Blenheim 2 with performance similar to the Brigand. The front was reworked with larger headlamps and grille opening, accentuated by a single central chrome strip. The track was widened, while other modifications shrunk the rather large turning circle to 11.9 m (39 ft).

The Blenheim 3 which went on sale in 2000 (shown in October 1999) and a much revised interior layout with completely new gear selector and improved instrumentation. Also, the engine saw significant improvements: higher compression along with reworked camshafts, heads, and a new engine management system gave what Bristol referred to as "significantly increased" power. Period publications estimate it to 360 hp (268 kW). As of early 2002 there was also a sportier model with blacked out trim, called the Blenheim 3S. A new manifold and bigger valves, along with a reworked engine management system which allowed another 500 rpm of engine speed, meant that about 400 hp (298 kW) was now on tap. Bristol themselves declined to offer official power figures, as usual, but simply stated that the engine provided "muscular authority." The suspension was firmed up and aluminium wheels were fitted. Four-pot brakes were included up front and the rear track was widened by 60 mm (2.4 in), which required the rear fenders to be reworked. At the rear end, four exhaust pipes were fitted.

In the spring of 2009 Bristol finished one further example, referred to as the Blenheim 4S/G, at the request of a customer. This revived the 603 body, albeit with the taillights of a 2000-2004 Audi A4 Avant (B6), and with new doorhandles replacing the usual Vauxhall units. It is not immediately apparent, but every single body panel is changed, even the roof, as the roof gutters were replaced with more modern, integrated roof gulleys. Series production seems to have been under consideration but the car remains a one-off.
