= Bristol 412 =

Bristol 412 Bristol Beaufighter Bristol Beaufort
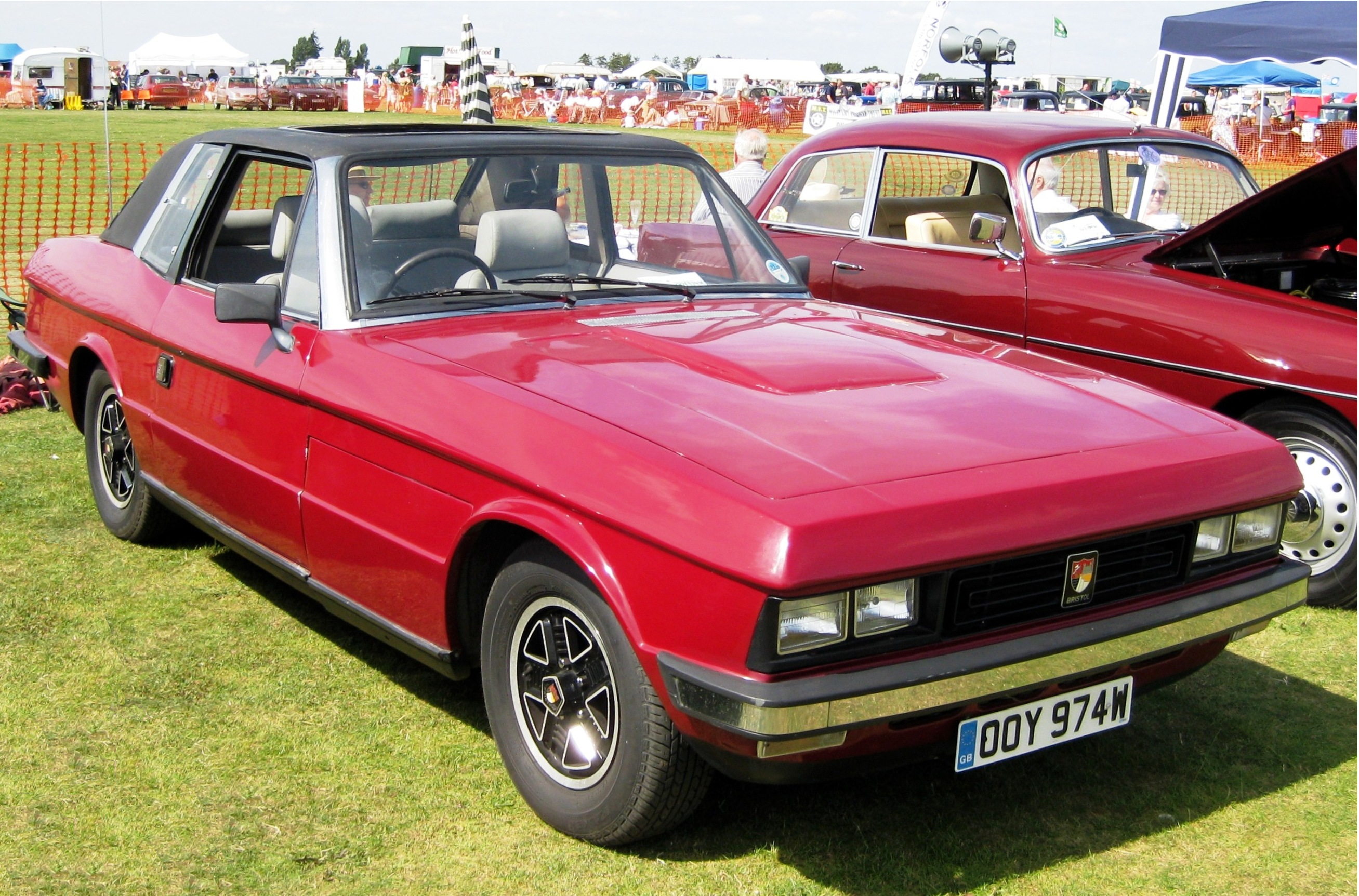
- Bristol Beaufighter

Overview
- Manufacturer: Bristol Cars
- Production: 1975–1994; no production figures published
- Assembly: United Kingdom: Filton
- Designer: Giuseppe Mittino at Zagato (convertible)

Body and chassis
- Class: Convertible
- Layout: FR layout
- Related: Bristol 603

Powertrain
- Engine: 6.6 litres (400 cu in) Chrysler B V8; 5.9 litres (360 cu in) Chrysler LA V8

Dimensions
- Wheelbase: 2,900 mm (114.2 in)
- Length: 4,910 mm (193.3 in)
- Width: 1,770 mm (69.7 in)
- Height: 1,440 mm (56.7 in)
- Kerb weight: 1,740 kg (3,836 lb)

Chronology
- Predecessor: Bristol 411

The Bristol 412 is a car which was produced by British manufacturer Bristol Cars from 1975 to 1986. Variants were produced as the Bristol Beaufighter, from 1980 to 1993, and as the Bristol Beaufort, from 1984 to 1994.

== Bristol 412 ==
Along with the Bristol 603, it was one of two concurrent successors to the long-serving 411 that had carried Bristol Cars through from the late 1960s to the mid 1970s. The 412 was the last in the continuously numbered series of Bristols beginning with Bristol 400.

Whereas the 603 was a dramatically restyled version of the characteristic Bristol two-door saloon, the 412 was different in that it was a Targa-type convertible with a removable roof that could be placed in the large luggage compartment. The earliest versions of the 412 were also very unusual for a post-World War II car in that the body was made by Zagato in Italy and attached to a chassis built by Bristol Cars in Filton, England. This chassis was almost exactly the same as that of the Bristol 603, but the earliest 412s retained the Chrysler B series petrol engines 6.6 L (400 cu in) producing 264 bhp (197 kW) and 335 lb⋅ft (454 N⋅m) torque, that had been introduced in the 411 series 4 the previous year. However, the second series of 412, which arrived towards the end of 1977, changed to the same 5.9 L (360 cu in) high performance, 225 hp (168 kW) and 280 lb⋅ft (380 N⋅m) torque version of the Chrysler LA petrol engine, designated E58, as that used in the Bristol 603 and later in its successor, the Bristol Britannia.

The 1977 second series cars incorporated front suspension modifications to allow for the lighter engine, the LA engine was approximately 70 lb (32 kg) lighter than the previous B series engine, along with a final drive changed to the longer 2.88:1 ratio, to improve economy. Other changes included improved ventilation, redesigned seats, as fitted to the 603, and service intervals extended to 10,000 miles (16,000 km).

In an effort to move into the United States market, Bristol designed a 412USA that complied with the extremely strict emissions and safety regulations of the US, with a catalytic converter and a much stronger roll bar than on the first 412. However, the company's specialist status made exporting very difficult and most of these modified 412 models were exported to Europe and markets such as West Germany and Switzerland.

The Bristol Owners Club (BOC) website lists twenty-nine 412 series one cars, thirty-four 412 series two cars and two 412USA cars.

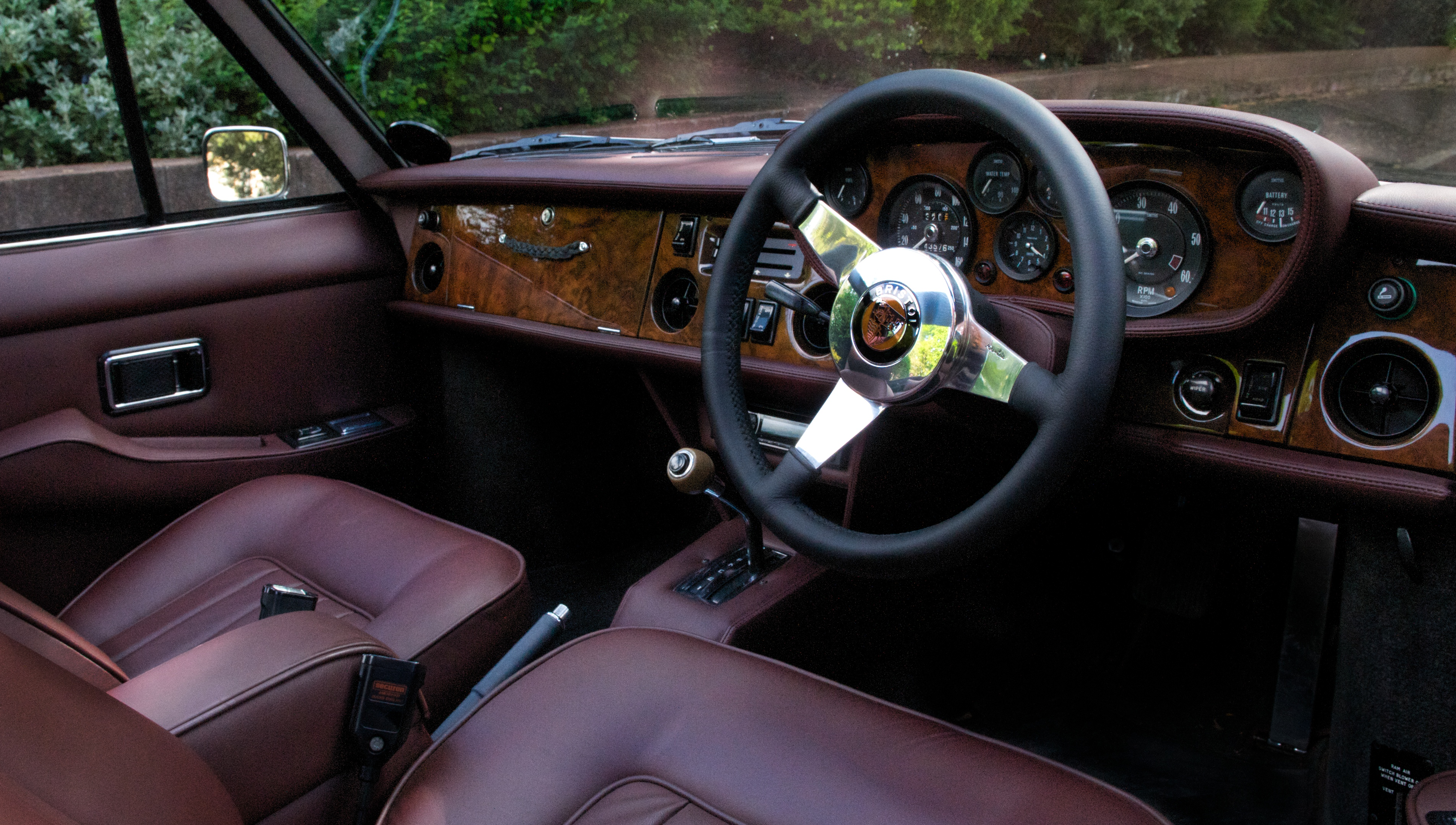
Bristol 412 interior

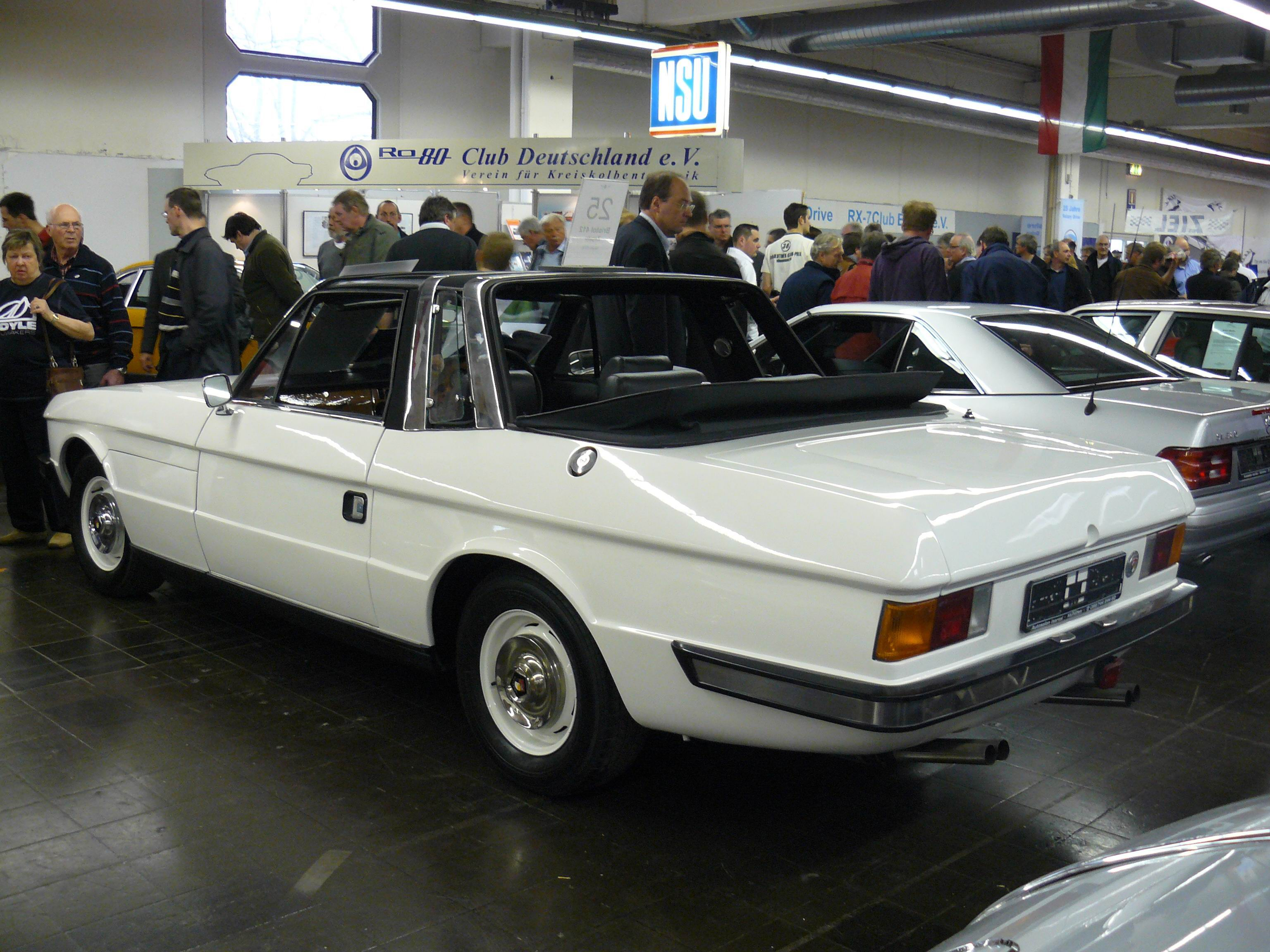
1978 Bristol 412 SII Targa

== Bristol Beaufighter ==
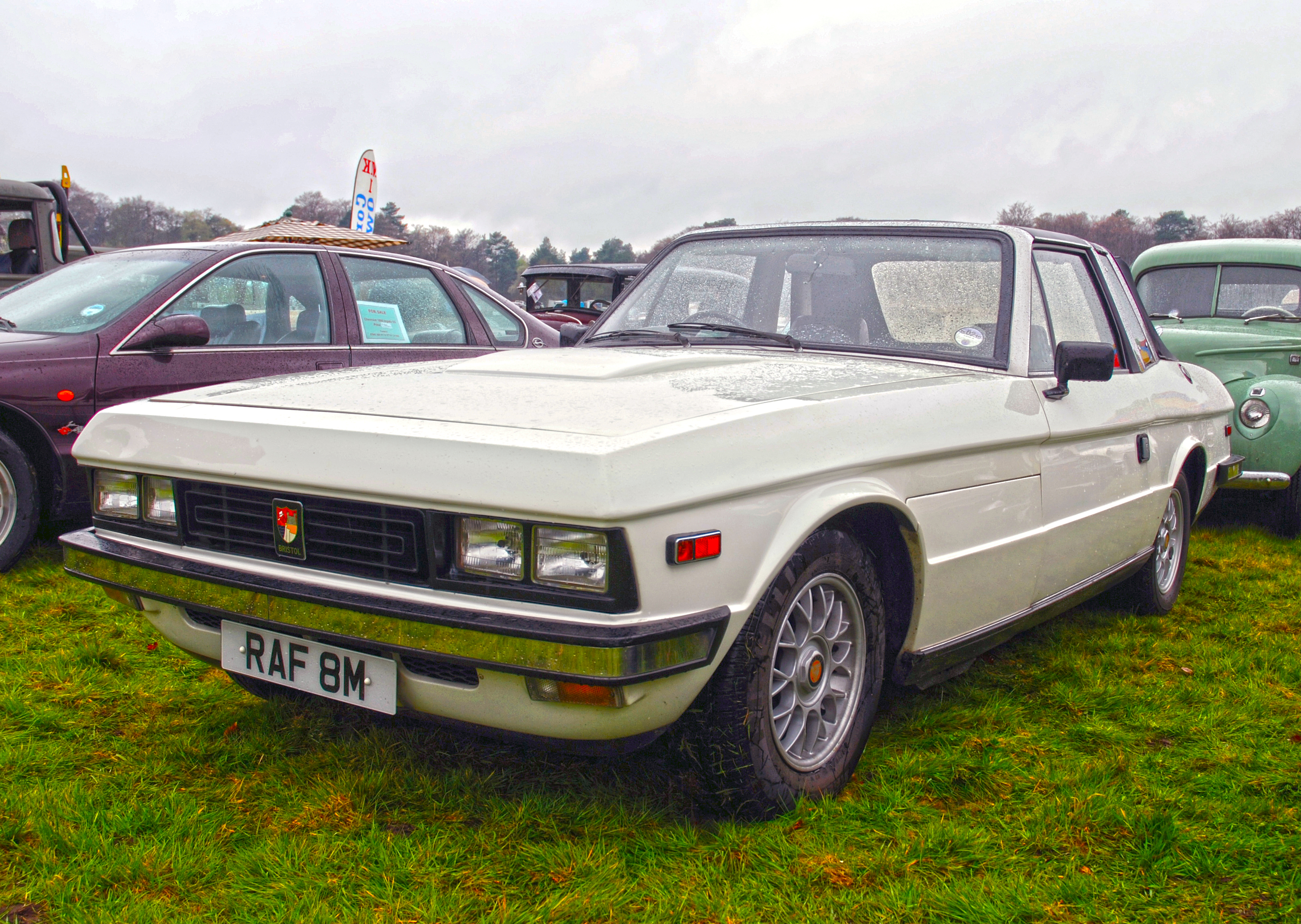
Bristol Beaufighter

The Beaufighter, named after the Bristol Beaufighter, a Second World War heavy fighter aircraft produced by Bristol Aeroplane Company (the parent of Bristol cars until 1960), was still designed by Zagato but now fully factory-bodied at Filton, had very similar styling to the original 412 except for the four-headlamp layout.

The earliest cars had a fixed roof over the driver and passenger containing a glass sunroof. They also featured a new dashboard design. Later cars reverted to the lift out panel as per the 412, whilst retaining the glass sunroof and saw the dashboard design return to that used in the 412.

The easiest way to visually distinguish between early and later models is the latter feature a bright metallic strip above the windscreen connecting to the tops of the A-pillars (refer to the image of the white Beaufighter, RAF 8M, above), which is absent on the early cars (refer to the image of the red Beaufighter (OOY 974W) in the page description).

The 5.9-litre V8 engine was upgraded by the addition of a Rotomaster turbocharger which increased power and torque by approximately 30%, giving the Beaufighter a maximum speed of over 241 km/h (150 mph), limited by gearing, and a 0-60mph time of around 6 seconds. To cope with the extra torque, the Torqueflite automatic gearbox that had been a constant in every Bristol since the 407 was upgraded with a stronger, thicker propeller shaft and a torque converter taken from the 7.2 L (440 cu in) RB engine found in Chrysler's top-of-the-line models during the 1970s.

The Beaufighter was first built in 1980 and continued until 1993. “Fewer than 20” were made, according to the Bristol Cars website.

The BOC website lists twenty eight (28) Beaufighter cars.

== Bristol Beaufort ==
For export only, primarily to continental Europe, the Beaufort, named after Bristol Aeroplane's Second World war torpedo bomber, the Bristol Beaufort, was the last development of the 412 to appear. It used the same turbocharged 5.9-litre V8 found in the Beaufighter. Unlike other versions of the 412, the Beaufort was a true convertible, with a powered roof.

The Beaufort had a reinforced windscreen frame to compensate for the absence of a fixed roll bar. To allow for the greater range between fill-ups with petrol necessary for touring beyond the short distances found in the British Isles, the Beaufort possessed a greatly enlarged fuel tank of 136 L (30 imp gal; 36 US gal) as opposed to the mere 82 L (18 imp gal; 22 US gal) tank of other Bristols of the time. This allowed a range from one fill-up to the next of around 800 kilometres (500 mi) whereas the Britannia, Brigand, and Beaufighter could typically only go for 480 kilometres (300 mi) without refuelling. It was produced in very small numbers until 1994.

The BOC website lists a single Beaufort as having been produced.
