= Chrysler LA engine =

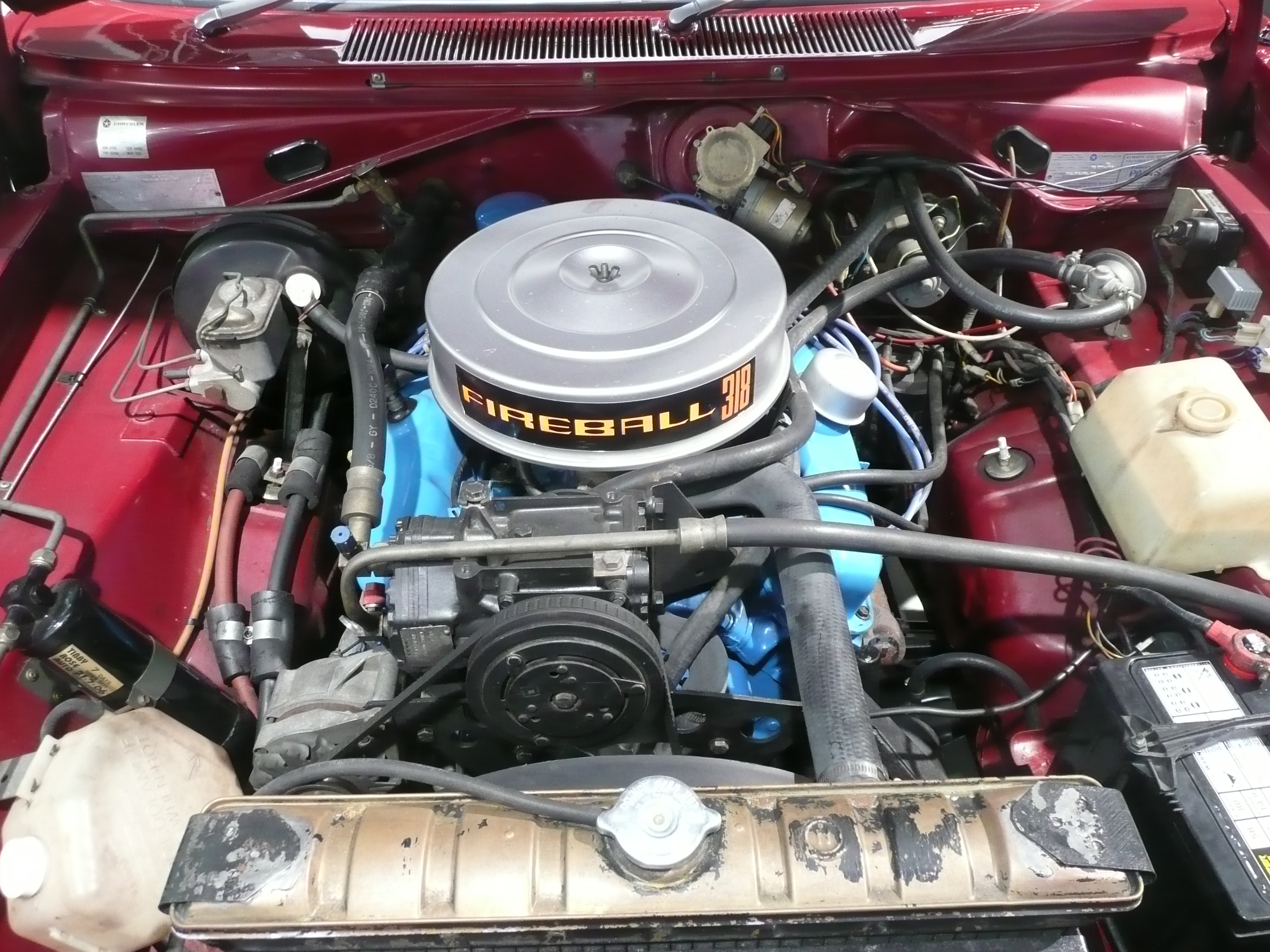
- LA engine installed in a Chrysler Australia 1976 Charger coupé

Overview
- Manufacturer: Chrysler (Mound Road Engine)
- Also called: Magnum engine
- Production: 1964–2003

Layout
- Configuration: Naturally aspirated 90° V6; Naturally aspirated 90° V8; Naturally aspirated 90° V10
- Displacement: 3.9 L; 238.2 cu in (3,903.2 cc); 4.5 L; 273.5 cu in (4,482.2 cc); 5.2 L; 317.3 cu in (5,199.9 cc); 5.6 L; 339.4 cu in (5,562.5 cc); 5.9 L; 359.8 cu in (5,895.6 cc); 8.0 L; 487.8 cu in (7,993.8 cc)
- Cylinder bore: 92.1 mm (3.63 in); 99.2 mm (3.91 in); 99.3 mm (3.91 in); 101.6 mm (4.00 in); 102.6 mm (4.04 in)
- Piston stroke: 84 mm (3.3 in); 84.1 mm (3.31 in); 90.9 mm (3.58 in); 98.6 mm (3.88 in)
- Cylinder block material: Cast iron
- Cylinder head material: Cast iron
- Valvetrain: OHV 2 valves per cylinder
- Valvetrain drive system: Timing Chain

Combustion
- Fuel system: Carburetor; Throttle-body fuel injection Multi-point fuel injection (V6 only); Sequential fuel injection (V6 only)
- Fuel type: Gasoline
- Oil system: Wet sump
- Cooling system: Water-cooled

Chronology
- Predecessor: Chrysler A engine Chrysler B engine
- Successor: Chrysler PowerTech engine; Chrysler Hemi engine

The LA engine is a family of overhead-valve small-block 90° V-configured gasoline engines built by Chrysler Corporation between 1964 and 2003. Primarily V8s, the line includes a single V6 and V10, both derivations of its Magnum series introduced in 1992. A replacement of the Chrysler A engine, they were factory-installed in passenger vehicles, trucks and vans, commercial vehicles, marine and industrial applications. Their combustion chambers are wedge-shaped, rather than polyspheric, as in the A engine, or hemispheric in the Chrysler Hemi. LA engines have the same 4.46 in (113 mm) bore spacing as the A engines.

LA engines were made at Chrysler's Mound Road Engine plant in Detroit, Michigan, as well as plants in Canada and Mexico. The "LA" stands for "Light A," as the 1956–1967 "A" engine it was closely based on and shares many parts with was nearly 50 pounds heavier. The "LA" and "A" production overlapped from 1964–1966 in the U.S. and through 1967 in export vehicles when the "A" 318 engine was phased out.

The basic design of the LA engine would go unchanged through the development of the "Magnum" upgrade (1992–1993), and continue into the 2000s with changes to enhance power and efficiency.

== 239 V6 ==
The 238.2 cu in (3.9 L) V6 was introduced with the Dodge Dakota for 1987, and replaced the older, longer Slant-Six in the Dodge Ram trucks and vans for 1988. It is essentially a six-cylinder version of the 318 V8. The bore and stroke are 99.3 mm (3.9 in) and 84 mm (3.3 in), respectively. Output was 125 hp (93 kW) and 195 lb⋅ft (264 N⋅m) until it was replaced by the 3.9 L Magnum starting in 1992. In 1987, it used a two-barrel Holley carburetor and hydraulic valve lifters. In 1988, it was upgraded with throttle-body fuel injection and roller lifters. For the 1992 Magnum update, the throttle-body fuel injection was upgraded to a multi-port fuel injection system. In 1997, it was then upgraded to sequential fuel injection. The engine was produced through 2003 before it was replaced with the 3.7 L PowerTech V6.

Applications:
- 1987–2003 Dodge Dakota
- 1988–2001 Dodge Ram
- 1988–2003 Dodge Ram Van

== 273 V8 ==
The 273 cu in (4.5 L) was the first LA engine, beginning model year 1964 and offered through 1969, rated at 180 hp (134 kW). It had a bore and stroke of 3.625 in × 3.31 in (92.1 mm × 84.1 mm). It had a mechanical solid lifter valvetrain until 1968 when hydraulic lifters were introduced; hydraulic lifters generally make for a quieter valvetrain. The reciprocating assembly included a cast or forged steel crankshaft, drop forged steel connecting rods and cast aluminum pistons. The valvetrain consisted of a cast nodular iron camshaft, solid or hydraulic lifters, solid pushrods, and shaft-mounted, malleable iron rocker arms (stamped steel on later hydraulic-cam engines). These actuated the overhead steel intake and exhaust valves. The cylinder heads featured wedge-shaped combustion chambers with a single intake and a single exhaust valve for each cylinder. Spark plugs were located in the side of the cylinder head, between the exhaust ports.

A high-performance 235 hp (175 kW) was offered from 1965 to 1967; called the "Commando", it was standard in the Barracuda Formula S model and optional in all other compact models excluding station wagons. It featured a 4-barrel carburetor and matching intake manifold, chrome unsilenced air cleaner with callout sticker, longer-duration and higher-lift camshaft and stronger valve springs, 10.5:1 compression ratio, and special black wrinkle valve covers with extruded aluminum appliqués. It was fitted to a low-restriction exhaust system with a 2.5 in (64 mm) exhaust pipe, collector-type Y-junction, and exposed resonator. For 1965 (only), the muffler was of "straight through" construction.

A special version, exclusive to the 1966 Dodge Dart, was available. It used a 0.5 in (12.7 mm) lift solid-lifter camshaft, fabricated-steel-tube exhaust, and a Holley 4-barrel carburetor, producing 275 hp (205 kW) (1 hp/cu in). The car so equipped was called the "D-Dart," a reference to its classification in NHRA D-stock for drag racing, which was the car's only intended purpose.

Applications:
- 1964–1969 Dodge Dart
- 1964–1969 Plymouth Barracuda
- Plymouth Belvedere
- Dodge Coronet
- Plymouth Satellite
- 1964–1969 Plymouth Valiant
- 1966–1967 Ghia 450 SS

== 318 V8 ==
The 317.6 cu in (5,204 cc) LA 318 has a bore and stroke of 3.906 in × 3.312 in (99.2 mm × 84.1 mm), identical to the A 318 it was derived from. It appeared in volume production beginning with the 1968 model year, replacing the last of the export "A" 318 engines equipped with polyspherical chambered heads ("A" 318 engines were not offered in 1967 domestic vehicles). The LA engine was available until 1991, when it was superseded by the Magnum version. It used hydraulic lifters and a two-barrel carburetor for most of its production, though four-barrel Carter Thermo-Quad and Rochester Quadrajet carburetors were used in police applications starting in 1978 and 1985, respectively. The 318 two-barrel ELD received roller lifters and a fast-burn chambered cylinder head in 1985 (the four-barrel police ELE 318 continued to use modified J heads and hydraulic flat valve lifters through 1989).

Throttle-body electronic fuel injection was factory equipment on the 1981–1983 Imperial. From 1988 to 1991, another throttle-body fuel injection system was used for truck and van applications.

Applications:
- 1983–1989 Chrysler Fifth Avenue
- 1981–1983 Imperial
- 1968–1981 Chrysler Valiant
- 1977–1981 Chrysler LeBaron
- 1979–1982 Chrysler New Yorker
- 1981–1983 Imperial
- 1975–1983 Chrysler Cordoba
- 1976–1980 Dodge Aspen
- Dodge Charger
- Dodge Challenger
- Dodge Coronet
- 1968–1976 Dodge Dart
- 1977–1989 Dodge Diplomat
- 1991–1992 Dodge Dakota
- 1971–1972 Dodge Demon
- 1973–1976 Dodge Dart Sport
- 1970–1980 (Valiant) Dodge Super Bee (Mexico)
- 1971–1979 Dodge GTX (Argentina)
- 1978–1979 Dodge Magnum
- 1980–1983 Dodge Mirada
- 1967–1992 Dodge Ram
- Dodge Ram Van
- 1974-1992 Dodge Ramcharger
- 1968–1974 Plymouth Barracuda
- Plymouth Belvedere
- 1970–1976 Plymouth Duster
- 1967–1972 Plymouth Fury
- 1972–1989 Plymouth Gran Fury
- 1964–1974 Plymouth Satellite
- 1974–1981 Plymouth Trail Duster
- 1968–1976 Plymouth Valiant
- 1976–1980 Plymouth Volaré
- 1981–19?? Allard J2X2
- 1976-1979 Monteverdi Safari
- 1977–1980 Monteverdi Sierra
- Volkswagen 11-160/22-160 (Ethanol-powered VW truck)
- Dodge E-13 (Ethanol-powered truck)
- Companhia Brasileira de Tratores (CBT) 3000 and 3500 (Ethanol-powered tractor)

== 340 V8 ==
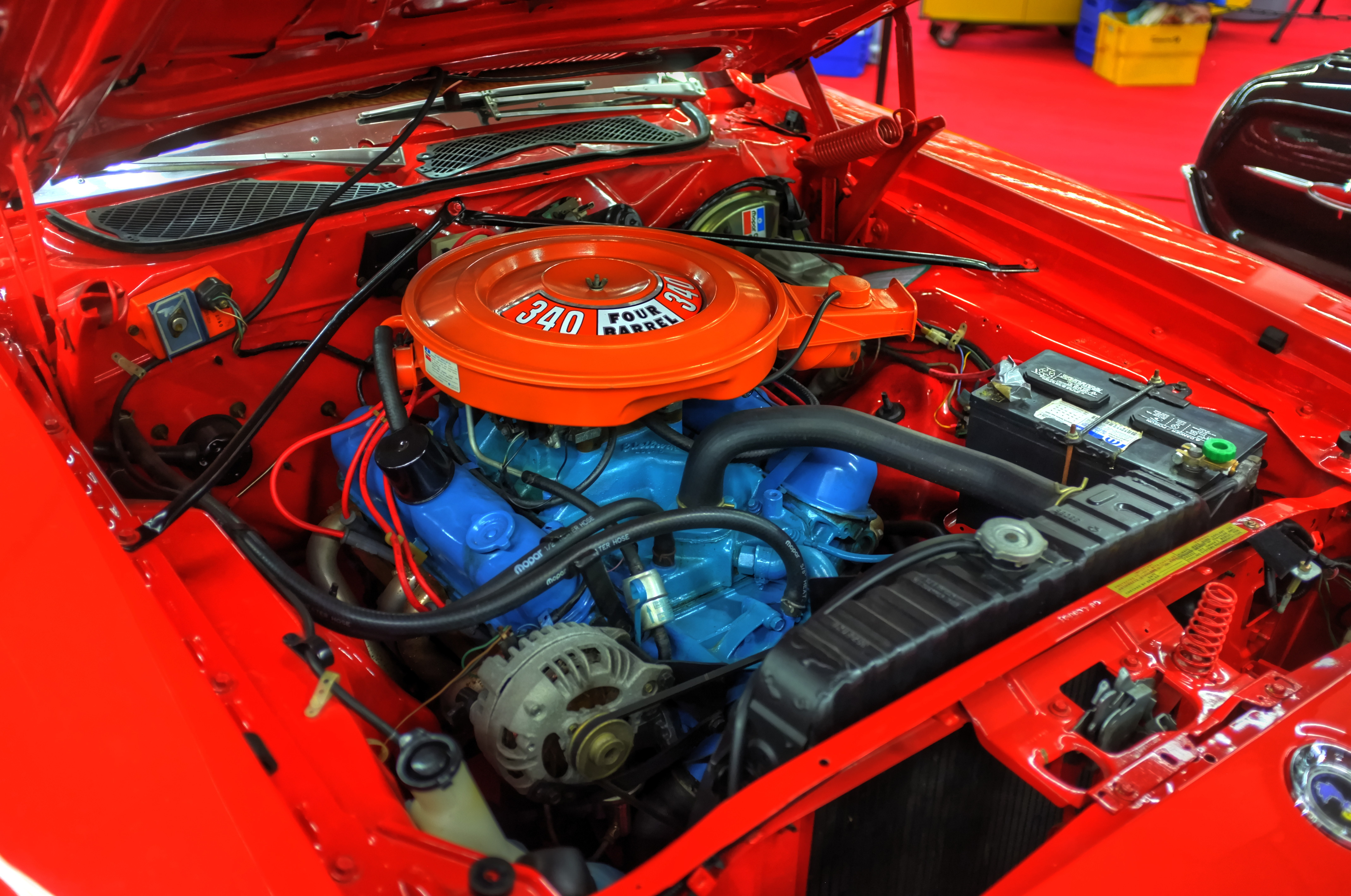
The base 340 cu in (5.6 L) came with a 4-barrel carburetor and produced 275 hp (205 kW) gross

In the mid-1960s, Chrysler decided to adapt the 318 cu in (5.2 L) small block V8 into a lightweight, high output engine equally suited for drag strip or street performance use. Its block was bored out to 4.04 in (102.6 mm) but its 3.31 in (84.1 mm) stroke left unchanged, resulting in the 340 cu in (5.6 L) engine introduced for the 1968 model year. Anticipating higher loads resulting from racing operation, the engineers fitted a forged shot peened steel crankshaft instead of the cast steel unit used in the 318. This also included shot peened hammer-forged steel connecting rods and high compression cast aluminum pistons with full floating pins. A 4-barrel carburetor was mated to a high-rise, dual plane intake manifold feeding high-flow cylinder heads that are still considered among the best of that era. Its big ports used 2.02 in (51 mm) intake and 1.60 in (41 mm) exhaust valves. An aggressive cam was fitted to take advantage of the much better breathing top end. The 1968 4-speed cars got an even hotter cam, but it was discontinued for 1969, where both automatic and manual cars shared the same cam. The engine was equipped with hydraulic lifters and two bolt main bearing caps, leading some to initially underestimate the 340's potential. The 1968–71 340's compression ratio was 10.5:1, placing it near the limit of what was possible on pump gasoline during that era. The 340 also used additional heavy-duty parts, such as a double-row roller timing chain and sump-mounted windage tray. Power output was officially stated as 275 hp (205 kW) gross for the 4 barrel.

In 1970, Chrysler introduced a special triple carburetor version of the 340 with triple 2-barrels at 290 hp (216 kW) gross. Exclusively called the catchy Six-Pack on the Trans-Am targeted Dodge Challenger TA models, the same configuration was used by Plymouth for its Trans-Am AAR 'Cuda, called just the "340-6" or "six barrel". This race-oriented version of the already high-performance 340 featured an aluminum intake manifold mounting three Holley carburetors, a dual points ignition system, and a heavy duty short block with additional webbing to allow for aftermarket installed 4 bolt main bearing caps. The application-specific cylinder heads featured relocated intake pushrod passages with offset rocker arms that allowed the pushrods to be moved away from the intake ports, which could improve airflow if the pushrod-clearance "hump" was ground away from the intake port by the end user.

The combination of increasingly stringent emission controls, lowered octane, rising gasoline prices, and insurance company crackdown on high-performance vehicles saw the relatively expensive 340 detuned in 1972 with the introduction of low compression (8.5:1) small valve heads, and by mid-year a cast nodular iron crankshaft and a variety of other emissions related changes. For the 1974 model year, it was replaced by the 360 cu in (5.9 L) engine.

Applications:
- Chrysler Valiant Charger (Australia)
- Dodge Challenger
- Dodge Charger
- Dodge Dart
- 1971–1972 Dodge Demon
- Dodge Super Bee
- Plymouth Barracuda
- Plymouth Duster
- Plymouth Road Runner
- Plymouth Sport Fury GT
- Monica 560

== 360 V8 ==
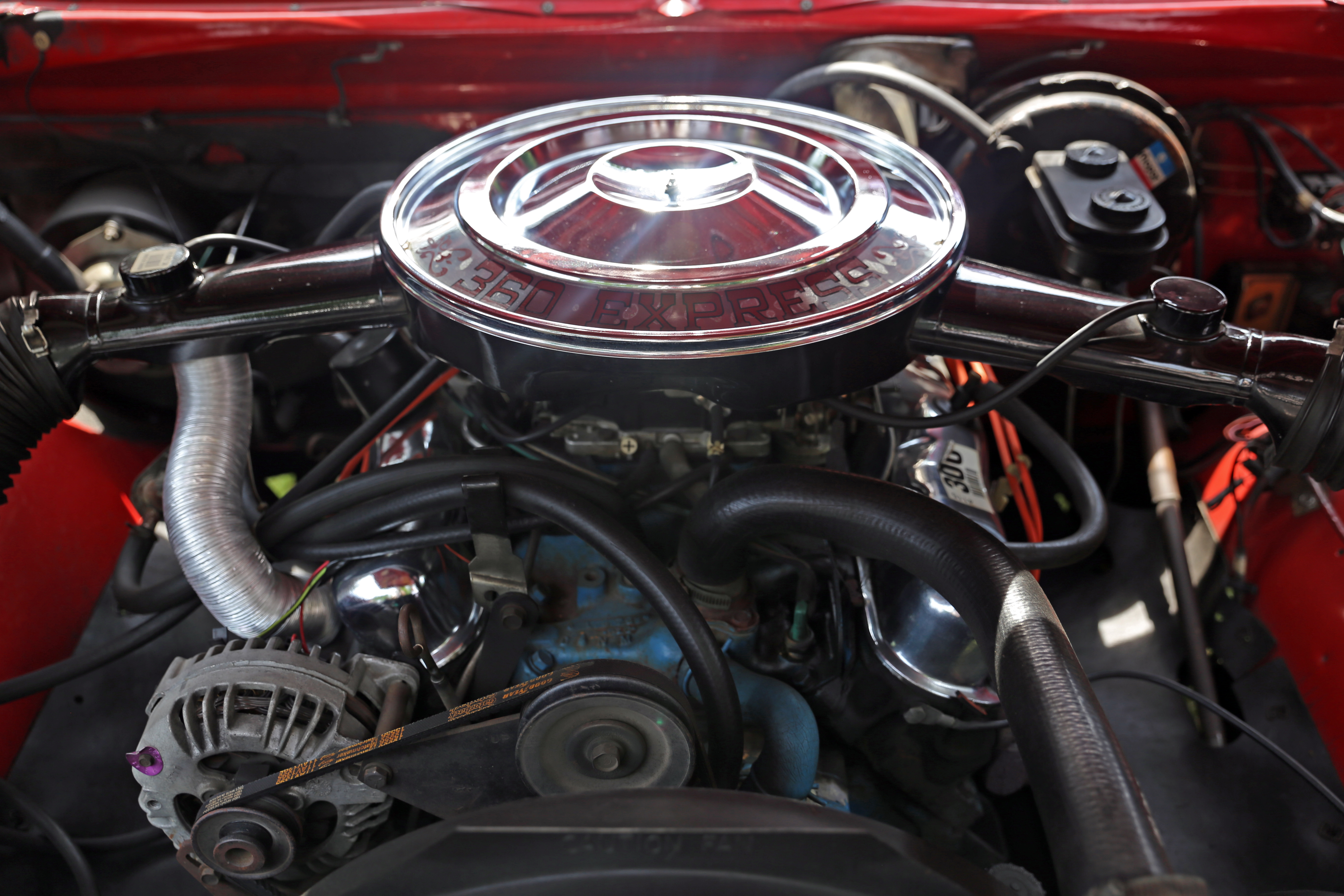
360 cu in (5.9 L) V8 in a Li'l Red Express Truck

The LA 360 cu in (5.9 L) has a bore and stroke of 4 in × 3.58 in (101.6 mm × 90.9 mm). It was released in 1971 with a two-barrel carburetor. The 360 used the large intake port 340 heads with a smaller intake valve of 1.88 in (48 mm). In 1974, with the introduction of the code E58 4-barrel dual-exhaust version, at 245 hp (183 kW) SAE net, it became the most powerful LA engine with the end of 340 production. Power started dropping from 1975 on as more emission controls were added resulting with the 1980 E58 engine only producing 185 hp (138 kW) SAE net. Starting with 1981, the 360 was exclusively used in Dodge trucks and vans.

The 1978–1979 Li'l Red Express truck used a special high-performance 360 4-barrel engine with factory production code EH1 that was rated at 225 SAE Net HP in production form The EH1 was a modified version of the E58 360 police engine (E58) producing 225 hp (168 kW) net at 3800 rpm due in part, that as it was installed in a "truck", and not a car, it did not have to use catalytic converters (1978 only) which allowed for a free-flowing exhaust system. Some prototypes for the EH1 featured Mopar Performance W2 heads, although the production units had the standard 360 heads. Some police package cars came from the factory with a steel crank and h-beam rods. There was also a "lean burn" version of the 360. The LA360 was replaced in 1993 by the 5.9 Magnum, which shared some design parameters with the LA360, but the majority of its components were different.

Due to additional modifications, the prototype Li'l Red Express truck tested by various period magazines ran appreciably stronger than actual production examples.

Applications:
- Chrysler 300
- Chrysler Valiant & Valiant Charger (Australia)
- Chrysler by Chrysler (Australia)
- 1975–1979 Chrysler Cordoba
- 1978–1979 Chrysler LeBaron
- 1977–1980 Chrysler New Yorker
- 1971–1980 Chrysler Newport
- 1976–1980 Dodge Aspen
- 1974 Dodge Challenger
- 1974–1978 Dodge Charger
- 1974–1976 Dodge Coronet
- 1974–1976 Dodge Dart
- 1978–1979 Dodge Diplomat
- 1978–1979 Dodge Magnum
- 1971–1978 Dodge Monaco
- 1971–1973 Dodge Polara
- 1971–1980 Dodge D Series
- 1981–1992 Dodge Ram
- 1979–1992 Dodge Ram Van/Dodge Ram Wagon
- 1971–1992 Dodge Sportsman/Dodge Tradesman
- 1974–1992 Dodge Ramcharger
- 1974–1981 Plymouth Trail Duster
- 1974–1975 Plymouth Road Runner
- 1974 Plymouth Barracuda
- 1974–1976 Plymouth Duster
- 1971–1978 Plymouth Fury
- 1975–1977, 1980 Plymouth Gran Fury
- 1976–1980 Plymouth Volaré
- 1974–1983 Plymouth Voyager
- 1979–1980 Dodge St. Regis
- 1978–1979 Dodge Li'l Red Express
- (in Bristol-modified form)
  - Bristol 603
  - Bristol 412
- (in Bristol-modified form with turbocharger)
  - Bristol Beaufighter
  - Bristol Brigand
  - Bristol Beaufort

== Throttle-body injected LA engines ==
The last variation of the LA series to be introduced before the Magnum upgrade was the 1988–92 throttle-body fuel injected, roller cam engine. The first engines to receive these modifications were the 318 cu in (5.2 L) V8 and 239 cu in (3.9 L) V6 engines. A Holley/Chrysler-designed, single-point, twin-injector throttle body assembly was mounted atop a slightly redesigned cast iron intake manifold. An in-tank electric pump and reservoir replaced the earlier mechanical (camshaft-eccentric driven) pump. The valvetrain was upgraded to include hydraulic roller lifters; however, cam specifications remained essentially unchanged. The resulting engine was somewhat improved as to power and efficiency. The 5.9 L V8 engines followed suit in 1989, but also received the overall improved "308" cylinder heads (casting number 4448308) that featured significantly higher flowing exhaust ports and a return to the original 1971 (non-fast burn) combustion chamber. However, with other manufacturers already introducing the superior multi-point fuel injection system, Chrysler considered a more drastic upgrade program.

As the TBI engines were being introduced, the new upgrade program was initiated in the Chrysler engineering department. In 1992, with emissions standards becoming ever more stringent in the United States, Chrysler Corporation released the first of the upgraded engines.

== Magnum engines ==
In 1992, Chrysler introduced the first of a series of upgraded versions of the LA engines. The company named their engine the "Magnum," a marketing term that had been used by the company previously to describe both the Dodge Magnum automobile and an earlier Dodge passenger car (only) engine series; the latter was based on the big-block B/RB V8 engines of the 1960s–70s.

The Chrysler Magnum engines are a series of V6, V8, and V10 powerplants used in a number of Chrysler Corporation motor vehicles, as well as in marine and industrial applications. This family of gasoline-burning engines lasted for over a decade, were installed in vehicles sold across the globe, and were produced in the millions.

=== Technical information ===
The Magnum engine is a direct descendant of the Chrysler LA engine, which began with the 273 cu in (4.5 L) V8 in 1964. While the Magnum 3.9, Magnum 5.2, and Magnum 5.9 (1992 and up) engines were significantly based on the 239, the 318, and the 360, respectively, many of the parts will not directly interchange and the Magnums are not technically LA engines; the only major parts that are actually unchanged are the connecting rods.

The cylinder block remained basically the same. It was still a V-shaped, 90-degree design made of cast iron. The crankshaft, located to the bottom of the block by five main bearing caps, was cast steel, and the eight connecting rods were forged steel. The pistons were cast aluminum, with a hypereutectic design. Cylinders were numbered from the front of the engine to the rear; cylinders 1, 3, 5, and 7 were found on the left (driver side) bank, or "bank 1," with the even numbers on the other bank.

Coolant passages were located between the cylinders. The gerotor-type oil pump was located at the bottom-rear of the engine, and provided oil to both the crankshaft main bearings and the cylinder heads (via the lifters and pushrods, as opposed to a bored passage on LA engines). Chrysler's engineers also redesigned the oil seals on the crankshaft to improve anti-leak seal performance. The oil pan was also made from thicker steel, and was installed with a more leak-resistant silicone-rubber gasket.

Gasoline was supplied to the intake manifold through a pair of steel rails that fed eight Bosch-type, top-fed, electronically actuated fuel injectors; there was one injector located in each intake runner. Each cylinder had its own injector, thus making the fuel system a "multi-point" type. Fuel pressure was regulated by a vacuum-controlled pressure regulator, located on the return side of the second fuel rail. Excess fuel was thereafter delivered back to the fuel tank. (Later versions had the regulator and filter mounted at the in-tank pump.)

To support the new fuel system, the intake manifold was of a new design. Known colloquially as the "beer keg" or "kegger" manifold, the part was shaped like half of a beer barrel lying longitudinally atop the center of the V-shaped engine block. The intake runners, which supplied the fuel and air to each cylinder, fed each of the intake ports in the newly designed cylinder heads. The bolts that secured the intake manifold to the cylinder heads were installed at a different angle from those on the older LA engine; they threaded in vertically, rather than at the 45-degree angle of the 1966 and up LA.

Air was provided from the air filter intake to the intake manifold by a Holley-designed, aluminum, twin-venturi, mechanically actuated throttle body, which was bolted atop the intake manifold. Each venturi was progressively bored and had a diameter of 50mm. To this unit were mounted the Throttle Position Sensor (TPS), Manifold Absolute Pressure (MAP) sensor and Idle Air Control (IAC) valve (initially referred to as the "AIS Motor"). A steel cable connected the accelerator pedal inside the vehicle to a mechanical linkage at the side of the throttle body, which acted to open the air intake butterfly valves inside the venturis. During idle these butterfly valves were closed, so a bypass port and the IAC valve were used to control the intake of air.

The cylinder heads were another fundamental change of the Magnum engine, being designed to meet stricter requirements in both power and emissions by increasing efficiency. These heads were cast iron units with new wedge-shaped combustion chambers and high-swirl valve shrouding. Combustion chamber design was most important in these new heads: LA engine cylinder heads were given a full-relief open-chamber design, but the Magnum was engineered with a double-quench closed-chamber type. The higher-flowing intake ports stepped up intake flow dramatically in comparison to the original LA heads, and the exhaust ports improved cylinder evacuation as well. The shape and porting of the chambers allowed for more complete atomization of the air/fuel mixture, as well as contributing to more complete combustion; these virtues allowed for much greater efficiency of the engine as a whole. The intake and exhaust valves were located at the top of each combustion chamber. The valves themselves had shorter, 5/16" diameter stems, to allow for the more aggressive camshaft. Intake valves had a port diameter of 1.92", while exhaust valves were 1.600", with 60cc combustion chambers. Spark plugs were located at the peak of the combustion chambers' wedge, between the exhaust ports; press-in heat shields protected them from the heat of the exhaust manifolds.

Cast iron exhaust manifolds, less restrictive than units found on previous engines, were bolted to the outboard side of each head. The new cylinder heads also featured stud-mounted rocker arms, a change from the shaft-mounted LA arms. This last change was due to the different oiling system of the new engine, as described in the next paragraph. The valve covers on the Magnum have 10 bolts rather than the previous 5, for improved oil sealing. In addition, the valve covers were made of thicker steel than earlier parts, and were installed with a silicone gasket.

The valvetrain was also updated, although it was still based on a single, center-block located camshaft pushing on hydraulic lifters and pushrods, one for each rocker arm. However, the cast nodular iron camshaft was of the "roller" type, with each lobe acting upon a hydraulic lifter with a roller bearing on the bottom; this made for a quieter, cooler-running valvetrain, but also allowed for a more aggressive valve lift. Each of the lifters acted upon a steel pushrod, which were of the "oil-through" type. This was another change for the Magnum. Because the new pushrods also served to provide oil to the top of the cylinder head, the rockers were changed to the AMC-style, screw-mounted, bridged half-shaft type. The new rockers also had a higher ratio: 1.6:1 compared to 1.5:1 in the LA engine, which increased leverage on the valves. In addition, the oil boss located at the end of the cylinder head on the LA engine was left undrilled, as it was no longer needed. However, the boss itself was left in place, perhaps to cut down on casting and machining costs, and to allow the use of earlier LA heads.

Engine timing was controlled by the all-steel, silent Morse timing chain (some early production engines had double-row roller timing sets), which was located beneath the aluminum timing cover at the front of the engine block. The timing chain sprockets, one each for the camshaft and crankshaft, were all-steel; for the last few years, the LA engine came with nylon teeth on the sprockets. At the rear of the camshaft was cut a set of helical gear teeth, these being used to spin the distributor. Mounted to the front of the timing cover was a redesigned, counterclockwise rotation water pump, with much improved flow. Externally, the accessory drive belt was changed to a serpentine system; coupled with an automatic belt tensioner this increased belt life, reduced maintenance and contributed to lower noise and vibration levels.

The ignition system was also all-new for the Magnum. Controlled by a new micro-processor-equipped Single-Board Engine Controller (SBEC, also known as the ECM, or Engine Control Module), the ignition system included a distributor mounted at the rear of the engine. A 36,000-volt ignition coil, usually located at the front right of the engine, provided electrical power to the center of the distributor cap, where a spinning rotor directed the power to each of the individual cylinders' spark plug wires. Ignition dwell, advance and retardation were electronically controlled by the SBEC.

The SBEC controlled the ignition, as well as the opening and closing of the fuel injectors. During cold startup, wide-open throttle and deceleration, it did this based on "open-loop," pre-programmed operating parameters. During normal idle and cruising, it began "closed-loop" operation, during which the module acted based upon inputs from a variety of sensors. The basic sensors that provided input to the SBEC included the Oxygen sensor (O2), Manifold Absolute Pressure (MAP) sensor, Throttle Position Sensor (TPS), Intake Air Temperature (IAT) sensor and Coolant Temperature sensor (CTS). The basic actuators controlled by the SBEC's outputs included the fuel injectors, ignition coil and pickup, and the Idle Air Control (IAC) valve. The latter controlled idle characteristics. However, the SBEC also controlled the operation of the charging system, air conditioning system, cruise control and, in some vehicles, transmission shifting. By centralizing control of these systems, the operation of the vehicle was simplified and streamlined.

Emissions output was controlled by several systems. The EGR, or Exhaust Gas Recirculation system, brought exhaust gas from the exhaust stream up to the intake manifold, lowering peak combustion temperatures, the goal being the reduction of NOX emissions. A PCV, or Positive Crankcase Ventilation system, introduced oil vapor and unburnt fuel vapors from the crankcase to the intake, allowing the engine to re-use these as well. Furthermore, gasoline vapors that would normally be released into the atmosphere were captured by the EVAP system, to then be introduced into the engine.

In 1996, the OBD-II on-board diagnostics system was introduced on all passenger vehicles in the United States, as per United States Environmental Protection Agency (EPA) regulation. As such, a new engine control computer was developed for vehicles powered by Magnum engines, known as the JTEC. The new Powertrain Control Module was more complex and more intelligent, and added programming meant it could also control automatic transmission and other powertrain functions; its firmware could also be reprogrammed ("reflashed") via the same OBD-II port. With the introduction of the JTEC, the EGR system was dropped from Magnum engines.

=== Magnum 3.9 L V6 ===
As the 5.2 L V8 was introduced in 1992, the often-forgotten V6 version of the Magnum engine became available in the Ram pickup and the more compact Dodge Dakota. Based on the LA-series 239 cu in (3.9 L) V6, the 3.9 L Magnum featured the same changes and upgrades as the other Magnum engines. The 3.9 L is essentially a 5.2 L V8 with two cylinders removed.

Power increased substantially to 180 hp (134 kW) at 4,400 rpm and from 195 to 220 lb⋅ft (264 to 298 N⋅m) at 3,200 rpm, as compared with the previous TBI engine. For 1994, horsepower was reduced to 175 hp (130 kW), mostly because of the installation of smaller-volume exhaust manifolds; torque ratings remained the same. For 1997, the 3.9 L engine's torque output was increased to 225 lb⋅ft (305 N⋅m), with a compression ratio of 9.1:1. Firing order was 1-6-5-4-3-2. This engine was last produced for the 2003 Dodge Dakota pickup. Starting in the 2004 model year, it was entirely withdrawn from production and replaced with the 3.7L PowerTech V6 engine.

Applications:

- 1992–2003 Dodge Dakota
- 1992–2003 Dodge Ram Van/Dodge Ram Wagon
- 1992–2001 Dodge Ram

=== Magnum 5.2 L V8 ===
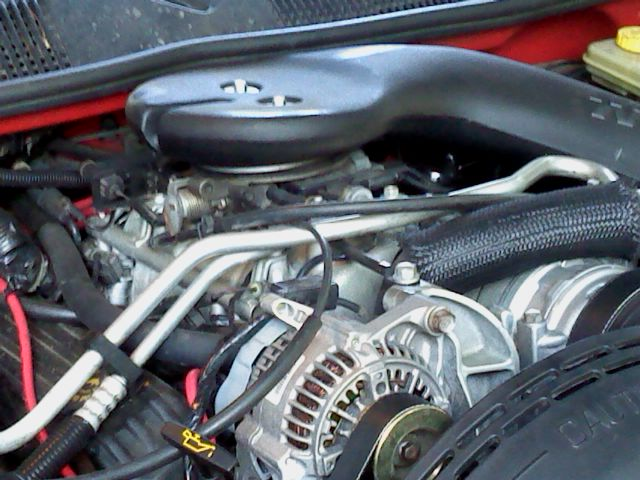
A 5.2L Magnum V8 as installed in a 1994 Jeep Grand Cherokee

The 5.2 L Magnum, released in 1992, was an evolutionary development of the 318 cu in (5.2 L) LA engine with the same displacement. The 5.2 L was the first of the Magnum upgraded engines, followed in 1993 by the 5.9 L V8 and the 3.9 L V6.

At the time of its introduction, the 5.2 L Magnum created 230 hp (172 kW) at 4,100 rpm and 295 lb⋅ft (400 N⋅m) at 3,000 rpm. Production of this engine lasted until 2003, when it was completely replaced by the newer 4.7 L PowerTech SOHC V8 engine.

General characteristics:

- Engine Type: 90° V8 OHV; 2 valves per cylinder
- Bore and Stroke: 3.91 in × 3.31 in (99.3 mm × 84.1 mm)
- Displacement: 318 cu in (5.2 L)
- Firing order: 1-8-4-3-6-5-7-2
- Compression ratio: 9.1:1, due to 62cc combustion chambers of Magnum heads
- Lubrication: Pressure-feed – full-flow filtration
- Engine oil capacity: 5 US quarts (4.7 L) with filter
- Cooling system: Liquid, forced circulation, ethylene glycol mixture
Applications:
- 1992–2000 Dodge Dakota
- 1992–2001 Dodge Ram
- 1998–2000 Dodge Durango
- 1992–1993 Dodge Ramcharger
- 1992–2003 Dodge Ram Van
- 1993–1998 Jeep Grand Cherokee

=== Magnum 5.9 L V8 ===
In 1993, Chrysler Corporation released the next member of the Magnum family: the 5.9 L V8. This was based on the LA-series 360 cu in (5.9 L) engine, and included the same upgrades and design features as the 5.2 L. The standard 5.9 L produced 230 hp (172 kW) at 4,000 rpm and 325 lb⋅ft (441 N⋅m) at 3,200 rpm; torque was increased to 330 lb⋅ft (447 N⋅m) at 2,800 rpm in the heavy-duty version. It was upgraded in 1998 to 245 hp (183 kW) at 4,000 rpm and 335 lb⋅ft (454 N⋅m) at 3,250 rpm. The 5.9 L came factory-installed in 1998–2001 Dodge Dakota R/T pickups and 2000–2003 Dodge Durango R/T SUVs. It was also installed in the Jeep Grand Cherokee Limited 5.9, only available in 1998. The 5.9 L Magnum was available until the 2003 model year, when it was replaced with the 5.7 L Hemi V8 engine.

Although the pre-Magnum (1971–92) and Magnum versions of the 360 cu in (5.9 L) are both externally balanced, the two are balanced differently (the Magnum version uses lighter pistons) and each requires a uniquely balanced damper, flywheel, drive plate, or torque converter. Bore and stroke size was 4 in × 3.58 in (101.6 mm × 90.9 mm); compression ratio was 9.1:1.

Applications:
- 1998–2003 Dodge Dakota
- 1992–2002 (and early 2003 models) Dodge Ram
- 1992–2003 Dodge Ram Van/Dodge Ram Wagon
- 1998–2003 Dodge Durango
- 1992–2001 Dodge Ramcharger
- 1998 Jeep Grand Cherokee 5.9 Limited

=== Magnum 8.0 L V10 ===
The Magnum V10 was a 488 cu in (8.0 L) V10 engine designed for use in Dodge Ram 2500 and 3500 trucks, which made its debut in 1994 and was produced through 2003. Although Chrysler had already introduced an aluminum block Lamborghini-influenced V10 in the 1991 Dodge Viper, this engine's roots trace to the genesis of the 5.2 L Magnum V8 in 1988.

The Magnum V10 has a cast iron block, and was rated for 300 hp (224 kW) (1994–1998) and 310 hp (231 kW) (1999–2003) at 4,100 rpm and 450 lb⋅ft (610 N⋅m) at 2,400 rpm. Bore and stroke were 4 in × 3.88 in (101.6 mm × 98.6 mm); compression ratio was 8.4:1; firing order was 1-10-9-4-3-6-5-8-7-2. Valve covers were die-cast magnesium (AZ91D alloy), rather than stamped steel; this lowered noise levels and made for better gasket sealing.

The Magnum V10 first became available in the 1994 model year Dodge Ram 2500 and 3500 (above 8,500 pounds GVWR), and was the most powerful gasoline-burning engine then available in any truck of that class.

Applications:

- 1994–2003 Dodge Ram 2500/3500

== Crate engines ==
Chrysler has offered a line of crate engines based on the Magnum designed to bolt into older muscle cars and street rods with little modification. Some of the changes to facilitate this were using a 1970–93 coolant pump so that older pulleys and brackets could be used, as well as an intake manifold that uses a carburetor instead of electronic fuel injection. With a high lift cam and single plane intake, the crate Magnum 360 cu in (5.9 L) was rated at 380 hp (283 kW) with the Magnum heads. Later models equipped with "R/T" or aluminum cylinder heads produced 390 hp (291 kW). A 425 hp (317 kW) bolt-in fuel injection conversion kit has also been available.

== See also ==
- Viper engine
- Chrysler engines
- Chrysler A engine
- Chrysler Hemi engine
