= Dodge Challenger (1970) =

Automobile

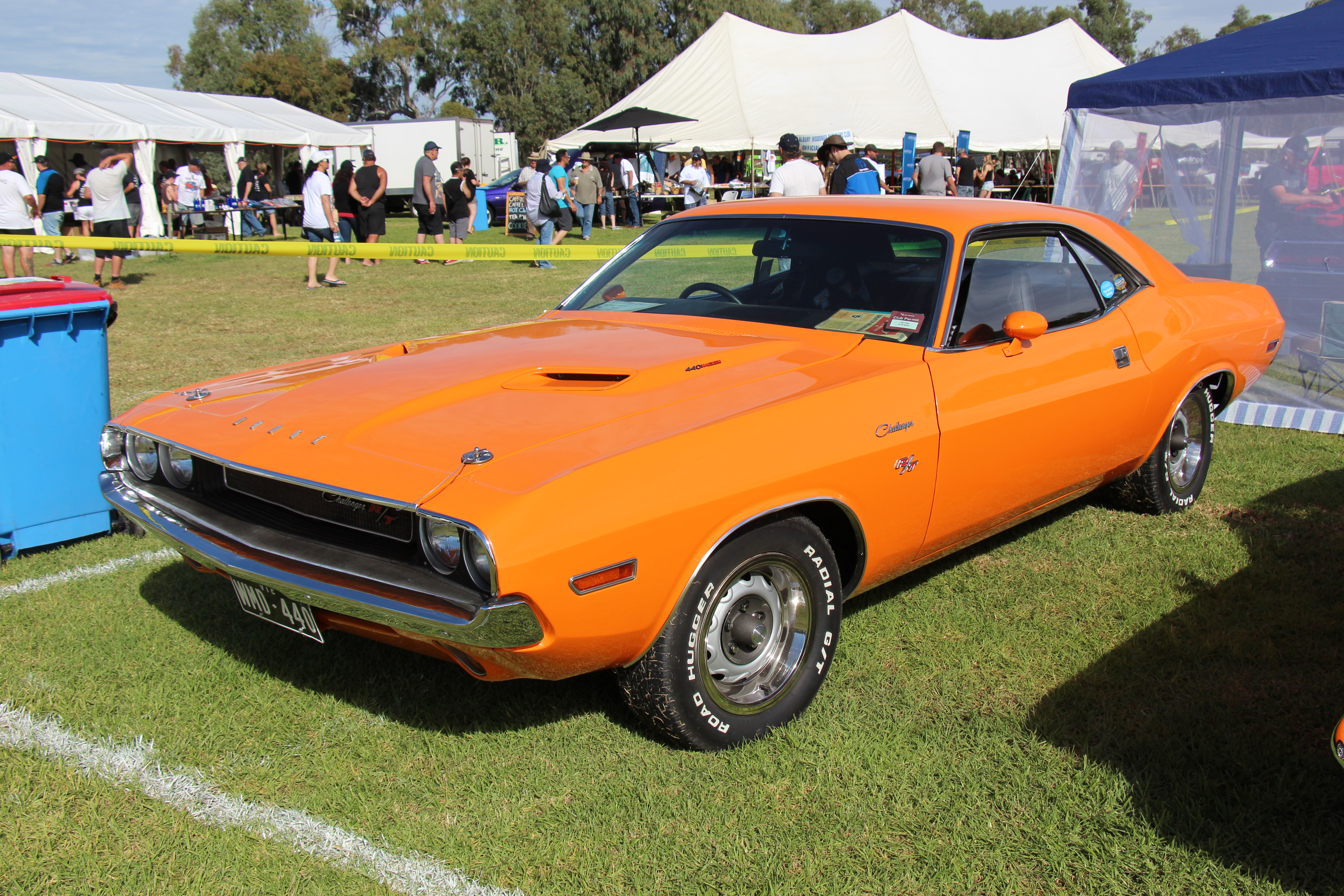
- 1970 Challenger R/T

Overview
- Manufacturer: Dodge (Chrysler)
- Production: 1969–1974
- Model years: 1970–1974
- Assembly: United States: Hamtramck, Michigan (Dodge Main Plant); Maywood, California (Los Angeles Assembly)
- Designer: Carl Cameron

Dimensions
- Wheelbase: 110 in (2.79 m)
- Length: 191.5 in (4.86 m)
- Width: 76.5 in (1.94 m)
- Height: 51 in (1.30 m)

Chronology
- Successor: Dodge Challenger (1978); Dodge Challenger (2008)

The Dodge Challenger is an automobile produced by American automobile manufacturer Dodge. The first use of the Challenger name by Dodge was in 1959 for marketing a "value version" of the full-sized Coronet Silver Challenger.

From model years 1970 to 1974, the first generation Dodge Challenger pony car was built using the Chrysler E platform in hardtop and convertible body styles sharing major components with the Plymouth Barracuda.

== Model history ==
Introduced in the autumn of 1969 for the 1970 model year, the Challenger was one of two Chrysler E-body cars, the other being the slightly smaller Plymouth Barracuda. Positioned to compete against the Mercury Cougar and Pontiac Firebird in the upper end of the pony car market segment, it was "a rather late response" to the Ford Mustang, which debuted in April 1964. Even so, Chrysler intended the new Challenger as the most potent pony car ever, and like the less expensive Barracuda, it was available in a staggering number of trim and option levels, and with virtually every engine in Chrysler's inventory.

The Challenger's longer wheelbase, larger dimensions, and more luxurious interior were prompted by the launch of the 1967 Mercury Cougar, likewise, a bigger, more luxurious, and more expensive pony car aimed at affluent young American buyers. The 110 in (2,800 mm) wheelbase was 2 in (51 mm) longer than the Barracuda's, and the Dodge differed substantially in its sheet metal, much as the Cougar differed from the shorter-wheelbase Mustang. Air conditioning and a rear window defogger were optional. With 1971 being the sole exception, the front ends of both cars differed from each other in that the Challenger had four headlights and the Barracuda had only two; a trend replicated by offerings from Chrysler's rivals.

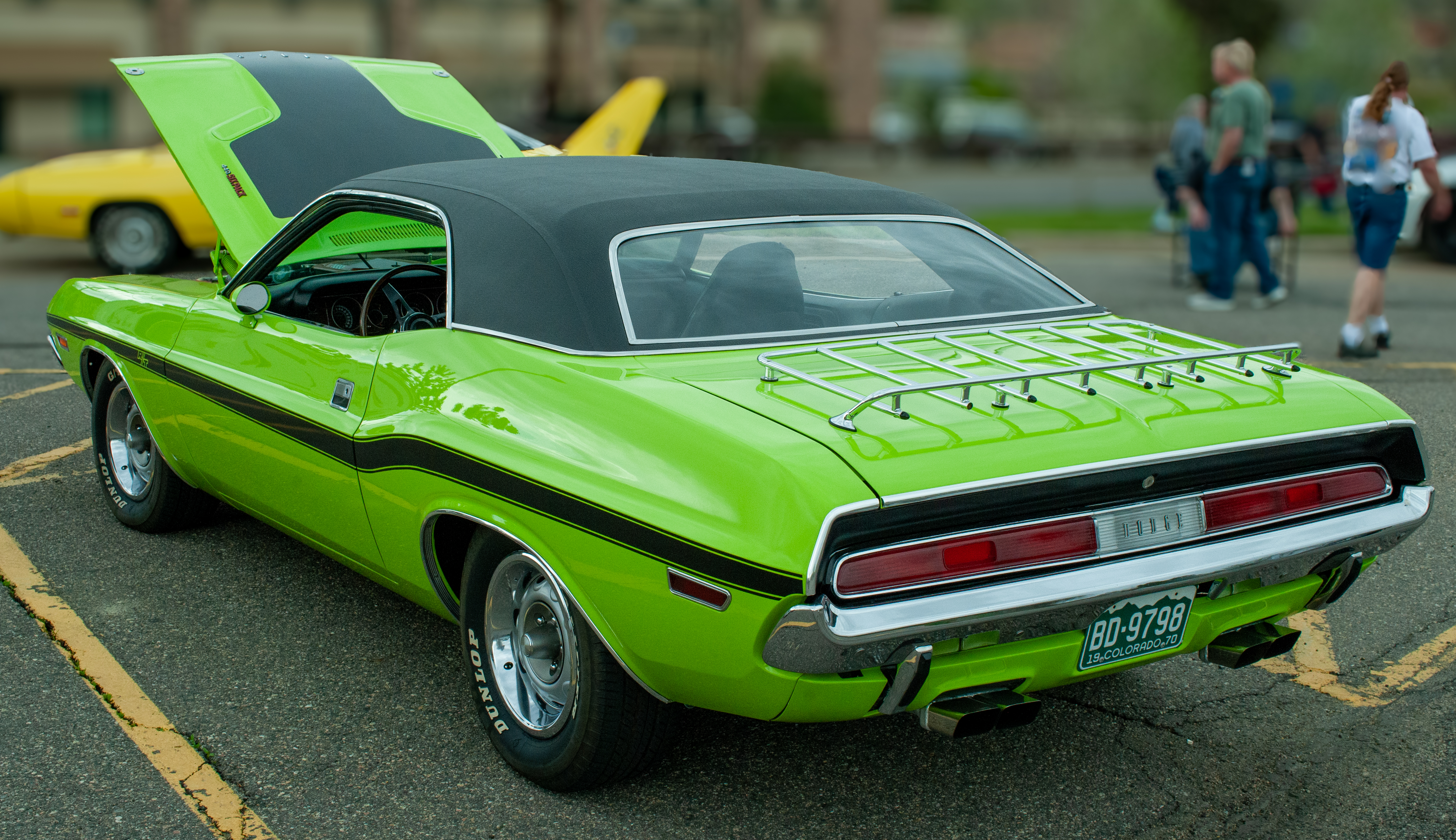
1970 Challenger R/T with 440 6 Pack Engine in Sublime Green

The exterior design was penned by Carl Cameron, who was also responsible for the exterior designs of the 1966 Dodge Charger. Cameron based the 1970 Challenger grille on an older sketch of a stillborn 1966 Charger prototype that was to have a turbine engine. The pony car segment was already declining by the time the Challenger arrived. Sales fell dramatically after 1970, and though sales rose for the 1973 model year with over 27,800 cars being sold, Challenger production ceased midway through the 1974 model year. A total of 165,437 first-generation Challengers were sold.

=== Model years ===
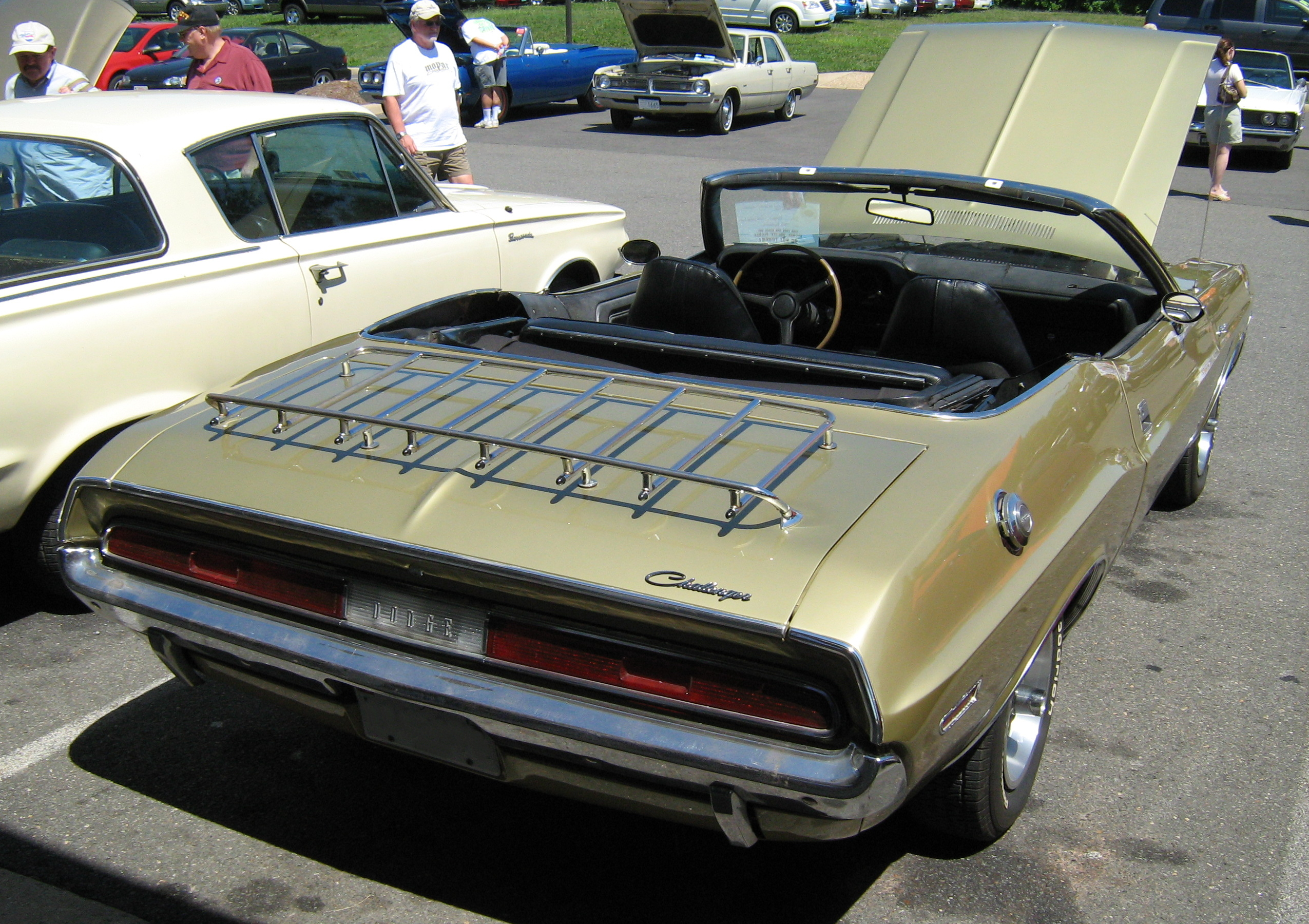
1970 Dodge Challenger Convertible

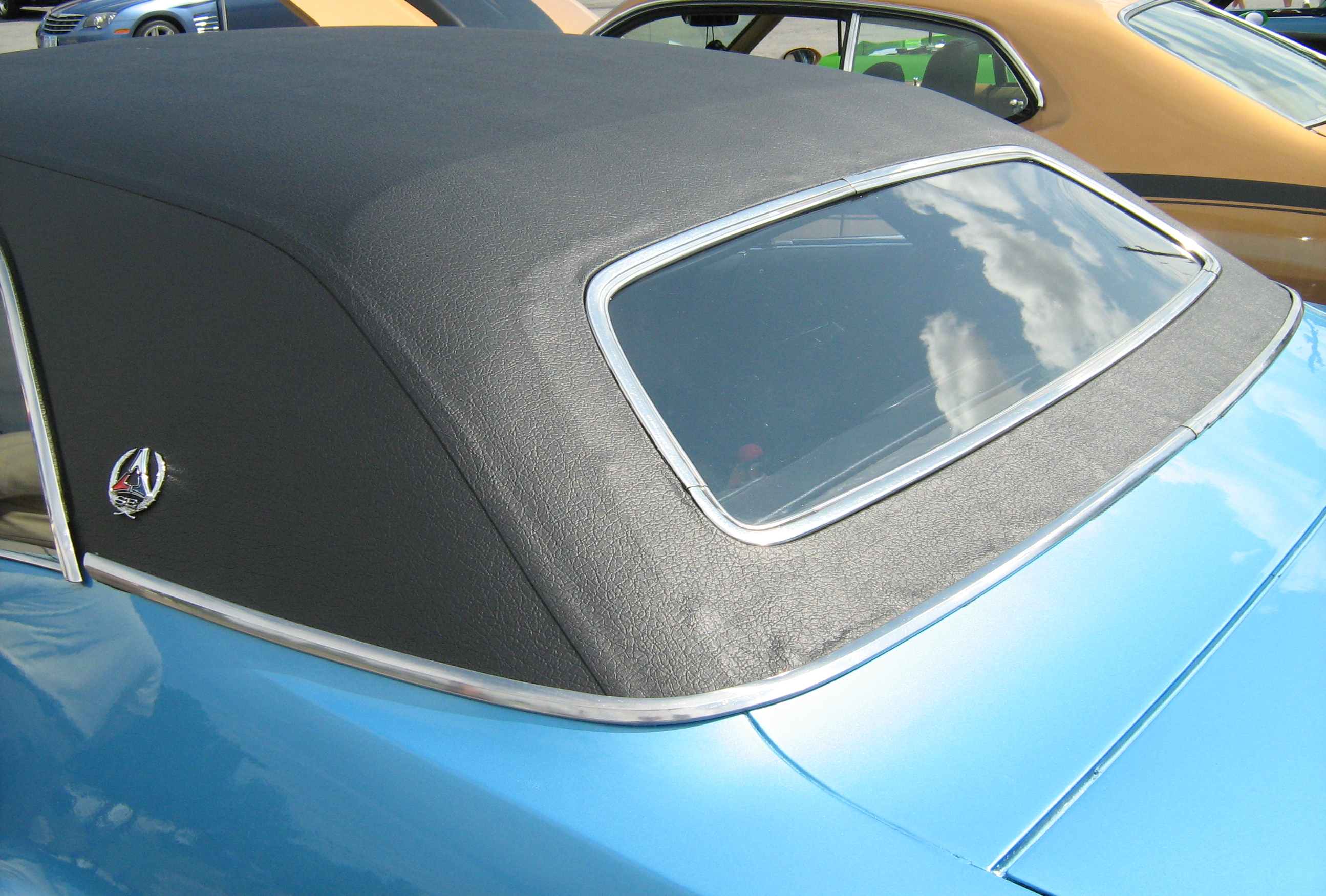
The 1970-only Special Edition hardtop featured a smaller "formal" rear window

==== 1970 ====
For its introductory model year the Challenger was available in two series, Challenger and Challenger R/T, and three models, two-door hardtop, Special Edition two-door hardtop, or convertible. The base model was the Challenger with either an inline-6 or V8 engine. The Special Edition hardtop, available on either the base Challenger or on the R/T, added a number of appearance, convenience, and comfort features. Produced for the 1970 model year only, this more luxurious SE specification included as standard a vinyl roof with a "SE" medallions on the pillars, a smaller "formal" rear window, leather and vinyl bucket seats, and an overhead interior console that contained three warning lights (door ajar, low fuel, and seatbelts). The standard engine on the base model was a 225 cu in (3.7 L) Straight-6. The standard engine on the higher trim models was a 318 cu in (5.2 L) V8 with a 2-barrel carburetor. For 1970, the optional engines included the 340 and 383 cu in (5.6 and 6.3 L), as well as the 440 and 426 cu in (7.2 and 7.0 L) V8s, all with a standard 3-speed manual transmission, except for the 290 hp (216.3 kW) 383 cu in. engine, which was available only with the TorqueFlite automatic transmission. A 4-speed manual was optional on all engines except the 225 cu in (3.7 L) Inline-6 and the 2-barrel 383 cu in (6.3 L) V8.

The performance model was the Challenger R/T (Road/Track), with a 383 cu in (6.3 L) "Magnum" V8, rated at 335 hp (250 kW); 300 hp (224 kW) for 1971, due to a drop in compression. The standard transmission was a 3-speed manual. Optional R/T engines were the 375 hp (280 kW) 440 cu in (7.2 L) Magnum, the 390 hp (291 kW) 440 cu in (7.2 L) Six-Pack and the 426 cu in (7.0 L) Hemi rated at 425 hp (431 PS; 317 kW) at 5,000 rpm and 490 lb⋅ft (664 N⋅m) of torque at 4,000 rpm. The R/T was available in either the hardtop or convertible. The Challenger R/T came with a Rallye instrument cluster that included a 150 mph (240 km/h) speedometer, an 8,000 rpm tachometer and an oil pressure gauge. The shaker hood scoop was not available after 1971.

A mid-year introduction was the low-priced Challenger Deputy, a coupe with fixed rear quarter windows lacking some of the base car's trim with fixed rear side glass as the most notable identifier. This model was named after a "sheriff-type" character that was featured in television commercials by Dodge at the time.

==== The 1970 Dodge Challenger T/A ====
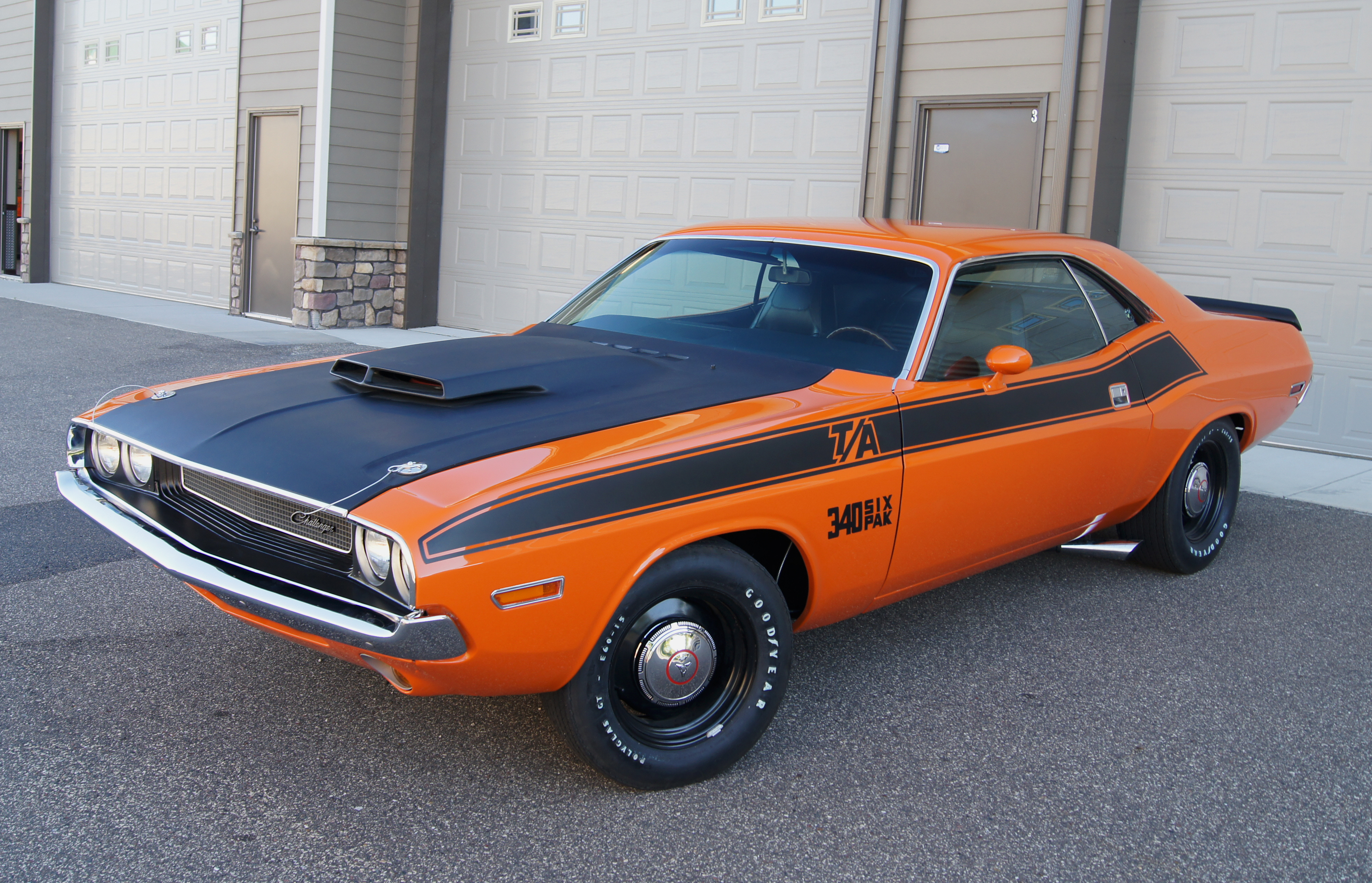
1970 Dodge Challenger T/A

A special model only available for the 1970 model year was the Challenger T/A (Trans Am) racing homologation car. To race in the Sports Car Club of America's Trans American Sedan Championship Trans Am, Dodge built a street version of its race car (just like Plymouth with its Plymouth 'Cuda AAR) which it called the Dodge Challenger T/A (Trans Am). Although the race cars ran a destroked 303 cu in (5.0 L) version of the modified 340, street versions took the 340 and added a trio of two-barrel carburetors atop an aluminum intake manifold, creating the 340 Six Pack. Dodge rated the engine at 290 hp (216 kW), only 15 hp (11 kW) more than the original 340 engine (which also had the same rating as the Camaro Z/28 and Ford Boss 302 Mustang). Air came in through a suitcase-sized air scoop molded into the pinned-down, hinged matte-black fiberglass hood. A low-restriction dual-outlet exhaust ran to the stock muffler location, then reversed direction to exit in chrome-tipped "megaphone" outlets in front of the rear wheels. Options included a TorqueFlite automatic or pistol-grip Hurst-shifted four-speed transmission, 3.55:1 or 3.90:1 gear ratios, as well as manual or power steering. Front disc brakes were standard. The special Rallye suspension used heavy-duty parts and increased the rate of the rear springs. The T/A was one of the first U.S. muscle cars to fit different size tires at the front and rear: E60x15 Goodyear Polyglas in the front, and G60x15 on the rear axle. The modified camber elevated the tail enough to clear the rear tires and its side exhaust outlets. Thick dual side stripes, bold ID graphics, a fiberglass ducktail rear spoiler, and a fiberglass front spoiler were also included. The interior was identical to other Challengers.

Dodge contracted Ray Caldwell's Autodynamics in Marblehead, Massachusetts to run the factory Trans-Am team. Sam Posey drove the No.77 "sub-lime" painted car that Caldwell's team built from a car taken off a local dealer's showroom floor. When the No.76 was completed mid-season from a chassis provided by Dan Gurney's All American Racers, Posey alternated between the two. Both cars ran the final two races, with Posey in the No. 77. Ronnie Bucknum drove the No.76 at Seattle, Washington, and Tony Adamowicz drove it at Riverside, California.

The Challenger T/A's scored a few top-three finishes, but lack of a development budget and the short-lived Keith Black built race engines led to Dodge leaving the series at season's end. The street version suffered from severe understeer in fast corners, largely due to the smaller front tires. A total of 2,399 T/As were made. A 1971 model using the 340 engine with a 4-barrel carburetor was planned and appeared in advertising, but was not produced since Dodge had withdrawn from the race series.

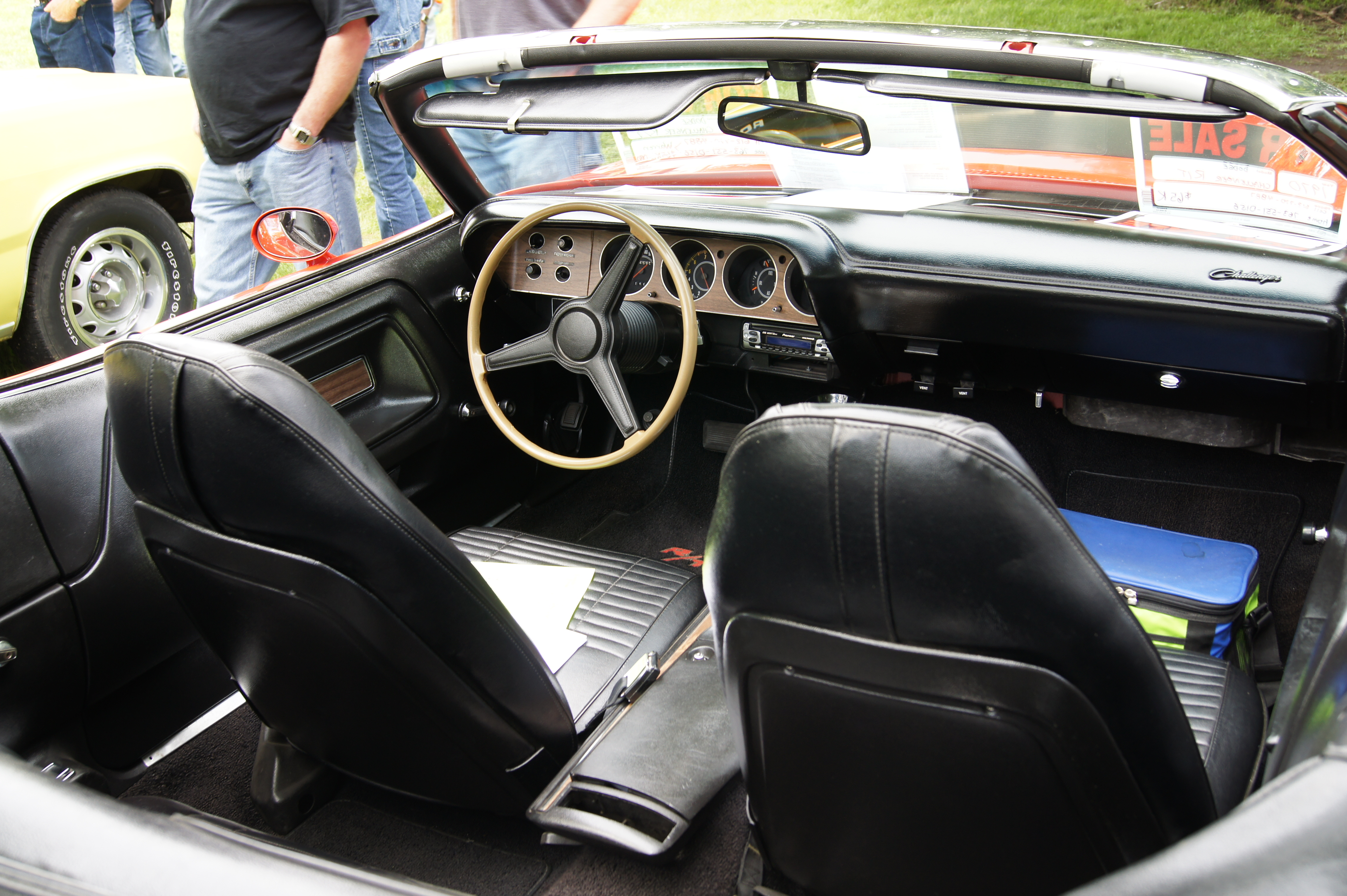
1970 Dodge Challenger R/T convertible interior

==== 1971 ====
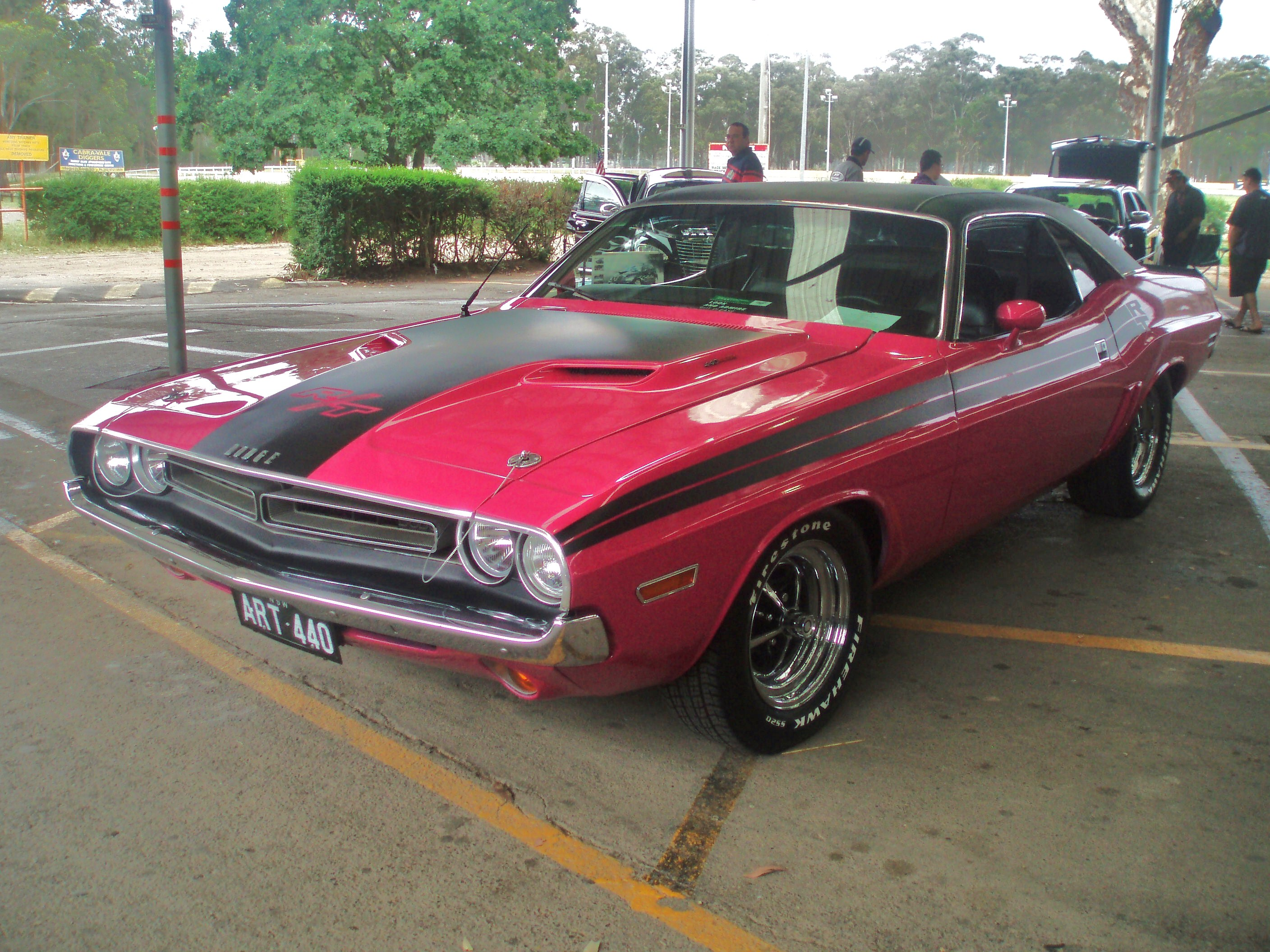
1971 Dodge Challenger R/T

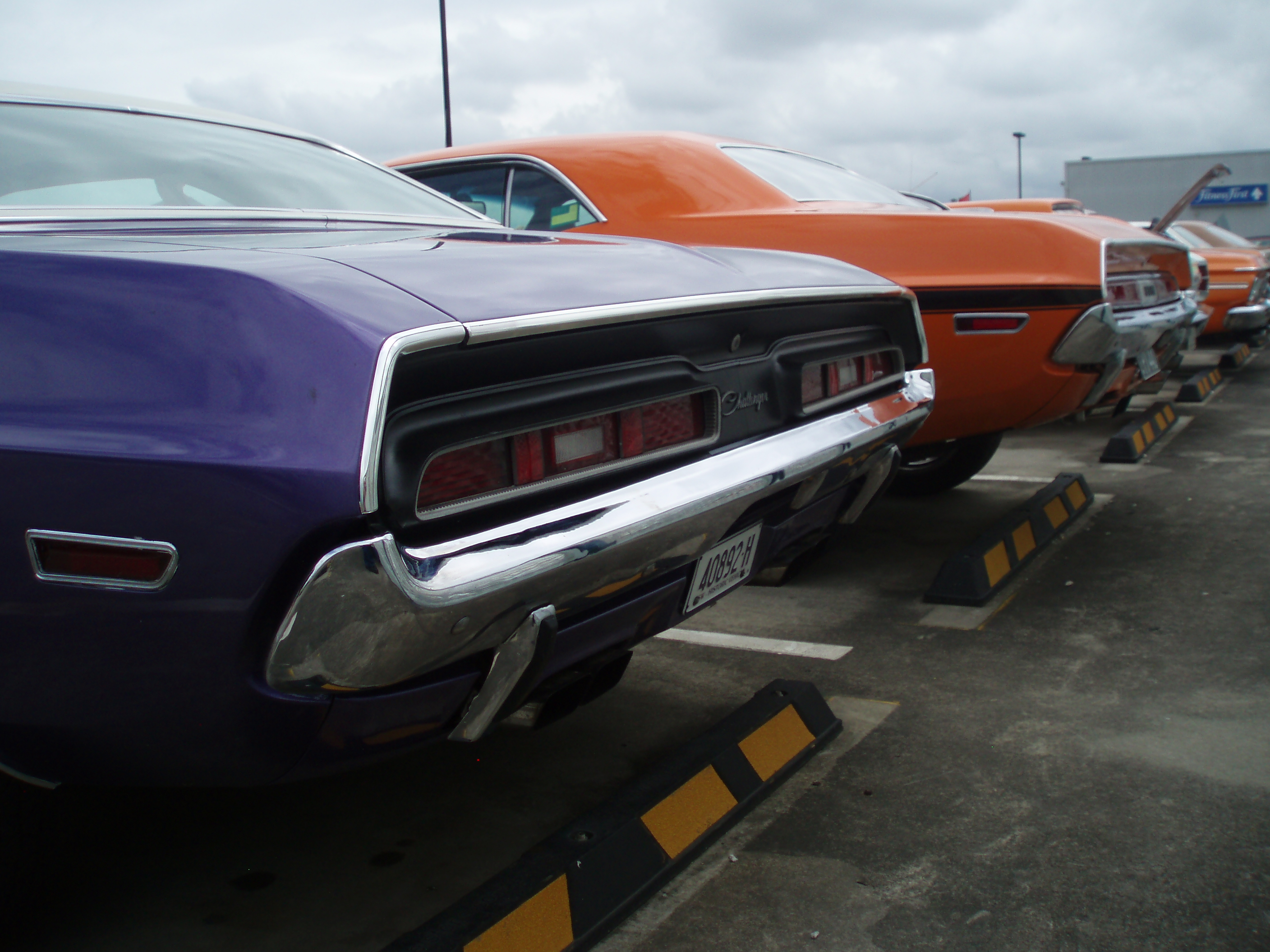
1971 Dodge Challenger R/T taillights next to the 1970 version

For the 1971 model year the Challenger Coupe became the entry-level model, with either a straight-six or V8 engine. Like the Challenger Deputy it replaced, it had fixed rear quarter windows and a basic black steering wheel with horn button.

==== 1972 ====
For the 1972 model year, the options lists (both for performance and appearance/convenience items) had been drastically cut back. The convertible version (though a sunroof was made available), most interior upgrade options (in particular leather seats), comfort/convenience items (in particular power windows and power seats), and all the big-block engine options were gone. The R/T series was replaced by the Challenger Rallye series. The Rallye model featured four simulated vents on the front fenders, from which exited matte black strobe tape stripes. Engine choices were down to three: the 225 cu in (3.7 L) slant-6, 318 cu in (5.2 L) V8, and a 340 cu in (5.6 L) V8 that was equipped with a 4-barrel carburetor, dual exhausts, as well as a performance-oriented camshaft and heads. All three engines were detuned to lower compression ratios to run on lead-free gasoline, and the horsepower ratings were lowered to reflect the more accurate Society of Automotive Engineers (SAE) net horsepower calculations. Each engine could be mated to a 3-speed manual or automatic transmission, while the 340 could also be equipped with a 4-speed manual if so ordered. The performance axle ratios were also gone except for a 3.55 sure grip which could only be had with the 340 and the heavy-duty suspension. The 1972 models also received a new grille that extended beneath the front bumper, as well as new rear tail-lights. Toward the end of the 1971 model year, a few convertibles were made with the 1972 front end (grille, lights, etc.) and rear end (tail lights and their panel). The only way to ascertain these 1972 Challenger convertibles is to look at its fender tag. On the code line which gives the dealer order number, that number will start with an "R", which designates "Special Meaning" (in this case, a TV 'special promotions' car).

==== 1973–1974 ====
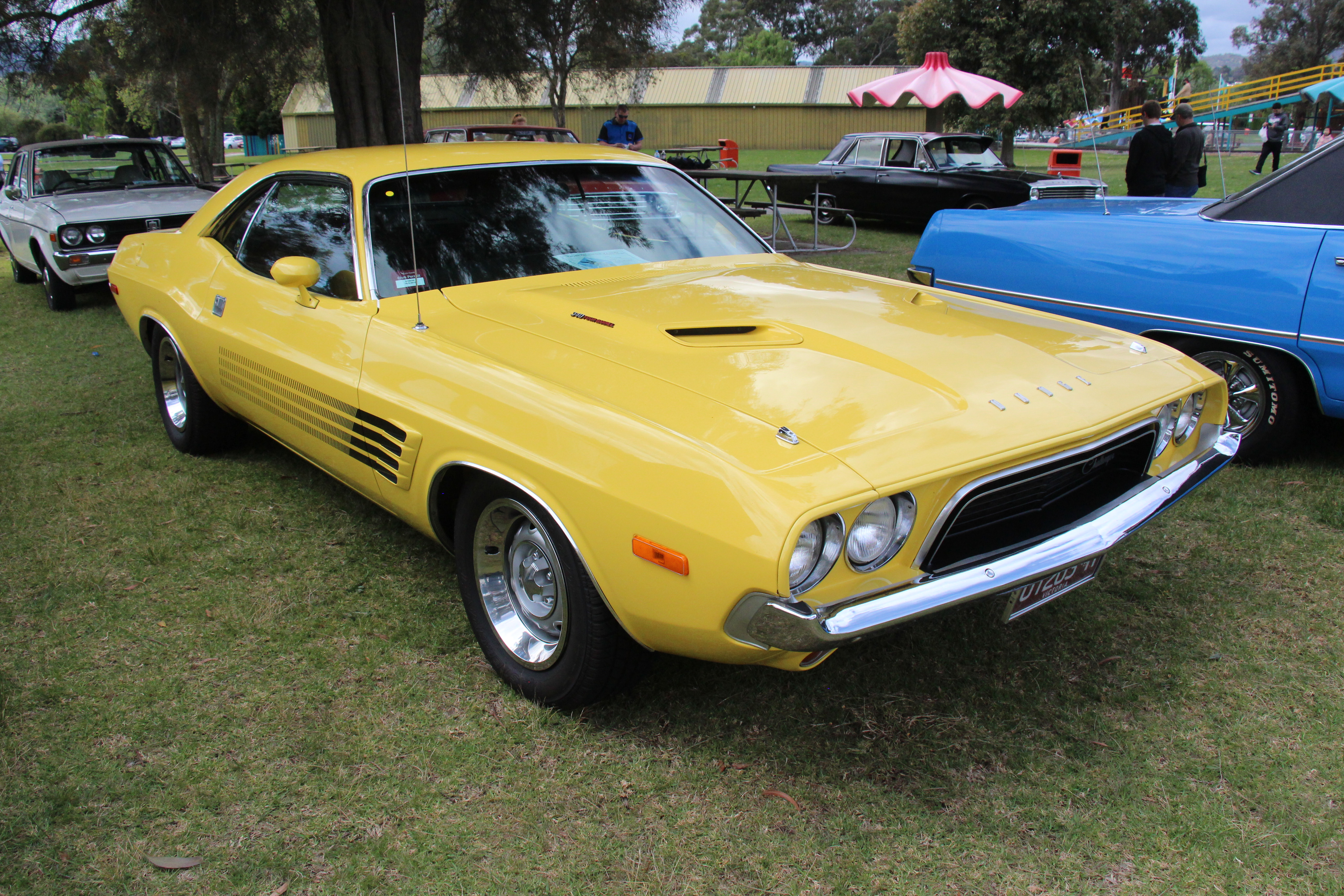
1973 Dodge Challenger Rallye

The 1972 grille and tail-light arrangement were carried over for the 1973 (and 1974) model years, and the mandatory 5 mph bumpers were added. While the 225 cu in (3.7 L) six-cylinder engine was dropped, (leaving just the two V8s), all option lists otherwise were carry-overs from 1972.

For 1974, the 340 cu in (5.6 L) engine was replaced by a 360 cu in (5.9 L) version offering 245 hp (183 kW), but the pony car market had fallen off and production of Challengers ceased in late April 1974.

=== Cosmetic variations ===
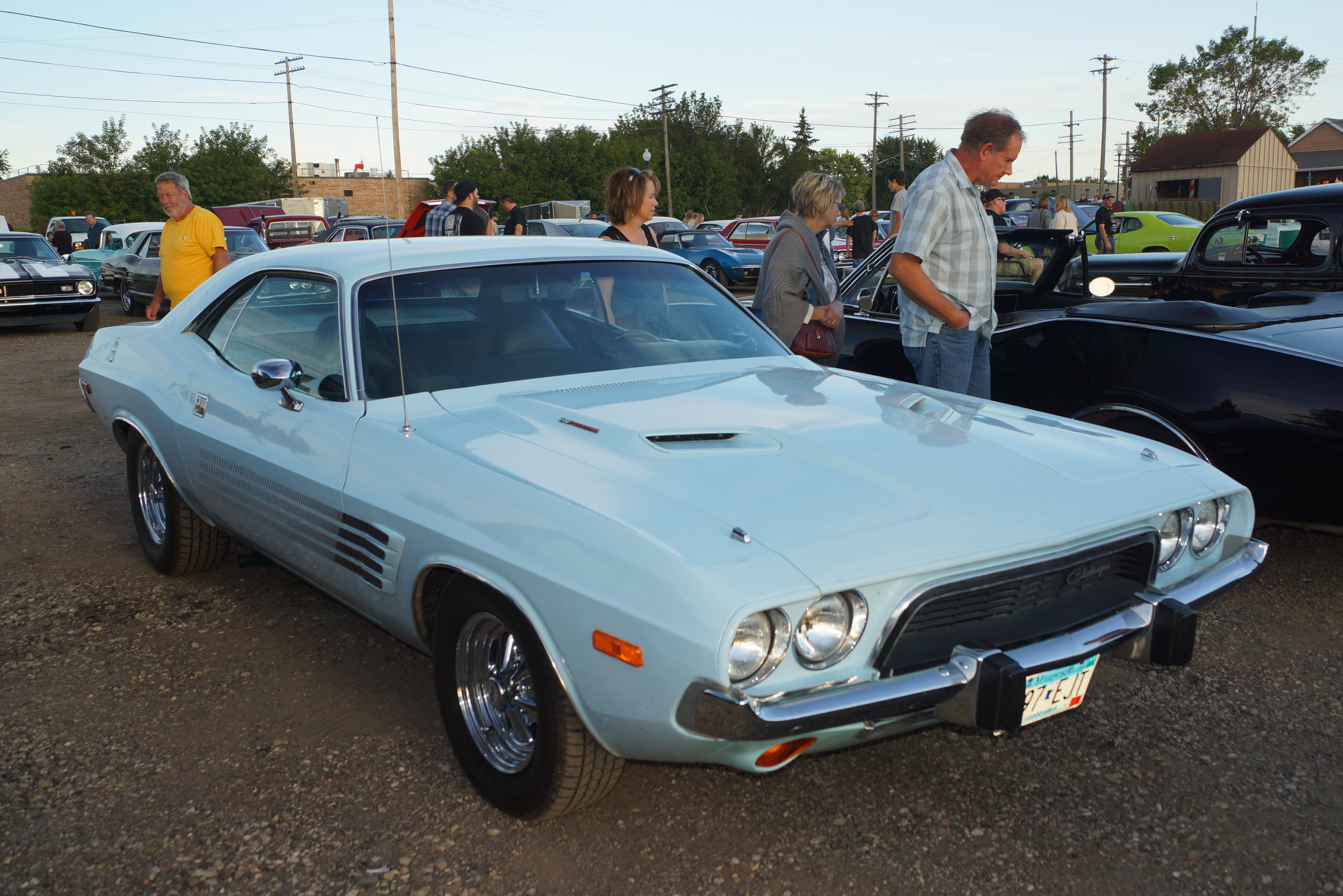
1973 was the first year of protruding bumper guards on the Challenger

Although the body style remained the same throughout the Challenger's five-year run, there were two notable changes to the front grille. The 1971 models had a "split" grille, while 1972 introduced a design that extended the grille (nicknamed the "sad-mouth") beneath the front bumper. With this change to the front end, 1972 through 1974 models had little to no variation. The only way to properly distinguish them is that the 1972s had flush-mounted bumpers with no bumper guards, (small bumper guards were optional), while both the 1973 and 1974 models had the protruding "5 mph (8.0 km/h)" bumpers (with a rubber-type filler behind them) in conjunction with large bumper guards. The 1974 cars had larger rear bumper guards to meet the (new for 1974 and on) rear 5 mph (8.0 km/h) rear impact law. These changes were made to meet U.S. regulations regarding crash test safety.

The 1970 taillights went all the way across the back of the car, with the backup light in the middle. In 1971, the backup lights were on the left and right instead of the middle. The taillight array also changed for 1972 onwards, with the Challenger now having four individual rectangular lamps.

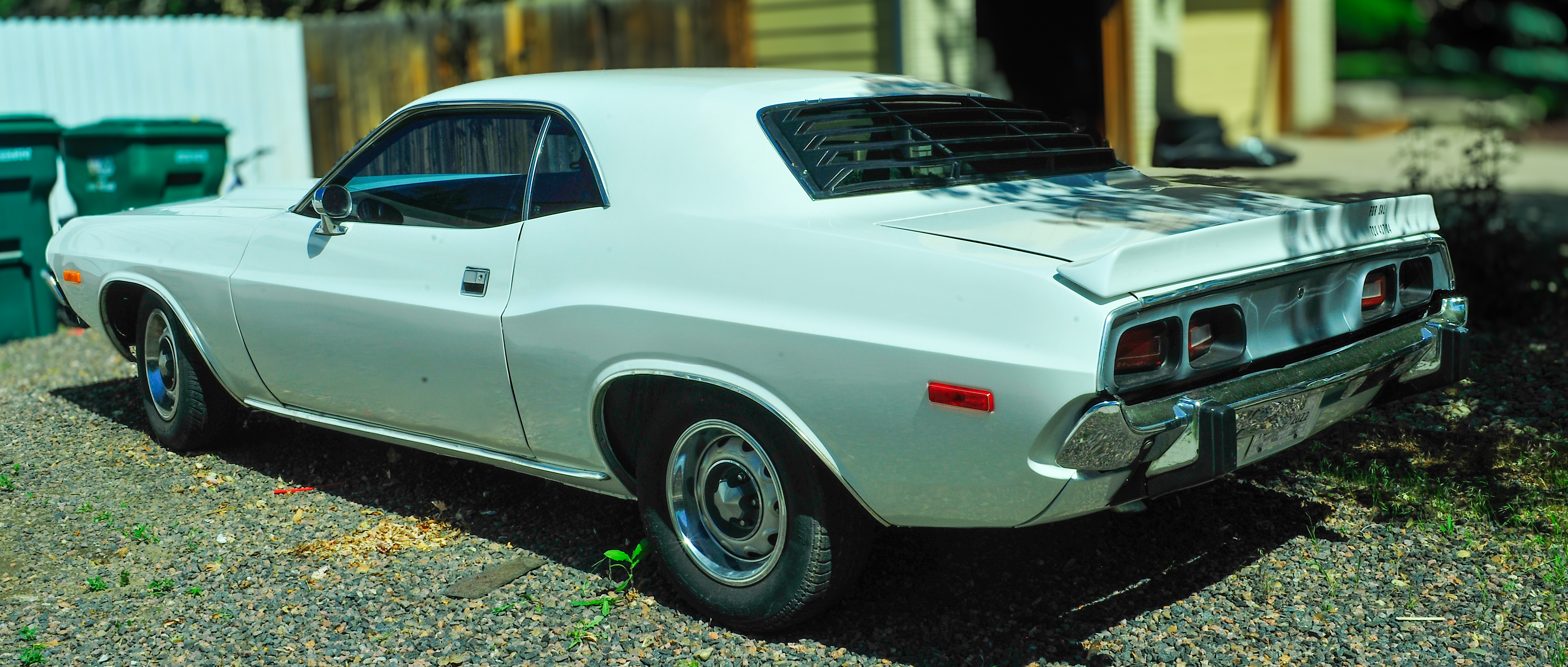
1972–1974 Dodge Challenger rear panel, featuring new for 1972 dual recessed tail light lenses. Bumper guards visible here only on 1973 and 1974 models

=== Collectibility ===
Although few mourned the end of the E-body models, the passage of time has created legends and highlighted the unique personalities of both the Challenger and the Barracuda. With a low total production, as well as low survivability over the years, any Challenger is worth a substantial amount of money. In a historic review, the editors of Edmunds Inside Line ranked these models as: 1970 was a "great" year, 1971 was a "good" one, and then "three progressively lousier ones" (1972–1974).

=== Export markets ===
Dodge Challengers were mainly produced for the U.S. and Canadian markets. Chrysler officially sold Challengers to Switzerland through AMAG Automobil- und Motoren AG in Schinznach-Bad, near Zürich. Only a few cars were shipped overseas each year to AMAG. They did the final assembly of the Challengers and converted them to Swiss specifications. There are few AMAG cars still in existence. From a collector's point of view, these cars are very desirable. Today, fewer than five Swiss Challengers are known to exist in North America.

Chrysler exported Dodge Challengers officially to France as well through their Chrysler France Simca operation, since Ford sold the Mustang in France successfully in small numbers. However, only a few Challengers were exported and Chrysler finally gave up the idea of selling them in France.

=== Engines ===
The SAE gross horsepower ratings were determined testing the engine with no accessories, no air cleaner, or open dyno headers. In 1971 compression ratios were reduced in performance engines, except the 426 cu in (7.0 L) and the high performance 440 cu in (7.2 L), to accommodate regular gasoline. 1971 was the last year for the 426 cu in (7.0 L) Hemi.

Engine type	Engine family	Displacement and name	Code	Carburetor	Exhaust	Compression ratio	Years	Power hp (kW)	Notes
I6	Chrysler Slant-6	198 cu in (3.2 L)	B	1-barrel	Single	8.4:1	1971	125 (93) SAE gross, 105 (78) SAE net	Challenger Coupe only
I6	Chrysler Slant-6	225 cu in (3.7 L)	C	1-barrel	Single	8.4:1	1970	145 (108) SAE gross	
I6	Chrysler Slant-6	225 cu in (3.7 L)	C	1-barrel	Single	8.4:1	1971–72	145 (108) SAE gross, 110 (82) SAE net	
V8	Chrysler LA	318 cu in (5.2 L)	G	2-barrel	Single	8.8:1	1970	230 (172) SAE gross	
V8	Chrysler LA	318 cu in (5.2 L)	G	2-barrel	Single	8.6:1	1971–72	230 (172) SAE gross, 155 (116) SAE net	Standard on 1972 Challenger Rallye
V8	Chrysler LA	318 cu in (5.2 L)	G	2-barrel	Single	8.6:1	1973–74	150 (112) SAE net	
V8	Chrysler LA	340 cu in (5.6 L)	H	4-barrel	Dual	10.5:1	1970	275 (205) SAE gross	N/A on Challenger R/T
V8	Chrysler LA	340 cu in (5.6 L)	H	4-barrel	Dual	10.3:1	1971	275 (205) SAE gross, 235 (175) SAE net	No cost option on Challenger R/T
V8	Chrysler LA	340 cu in (5.6 L)	H	4-barrel	Dual	8.5:1	1972–73	240 (179) SAE net	
V8	Chrysler LA	340 cu in (5.6 L) Six Pack	J	3× 2-barrel	Dual		1970	290 (216) SAE gross	Challenger T/A only
V8	Chrysler LA	360 cu in (5.9 L)	L	4-barrel	Dual	8.2:1	1974	245 (183) SAE net	
V8	Chrysler B	383 cu in (6.3 L)	L	2-barrel	Single	8.7:1	1970	290 (216) SAE gross	N/A on Challenger R/T
V8	Chrysler B	383 cu in (6.3 L)	L	2-barrel	Single	8.5:1	1971	275 (205) SAE gross, 190 (142) SAE net	N/A on Challenger R/T
V8	Chrysler B	383 cu in (6.3 L) Magnum	N	4-barrel	Dual	9.5:1	1970	330 (246) SAE gross	N/A on Challenger R/T
V8	Chrysler B	383 cu in (6.3 L) Magnum	N	4-barrel	Dual	9.5:1	1970	335 (250) SAE gross	Standard on Challenger R/T
V8	Chrysler B	383 cu in (6.3 L) Magnum	N	4-barrel	Dual	8.5:1	1971	300 (224) SAE gross, 250 (186) SAE net	Standard on Challenger R/T
V8	Chrysler RB	440 cu in (7.2 L) Magnum	U	4-barrel	Dual	9.7:1	1970	375 (280) SAE gross	Challenger R/T only
V8	Chrysler RB	440 cu in (7.2 L) Six Pack	V	3× 2-barrel	Dual	10.5:1	1970	390 (291) SAE gross	Challenger R/T only
V8	Chrysler RB	440 cu in (7.2 L) Six Pack	V	3× 2-barrel	Dual	10.3:1	1971	385 (287) SAE gross, 340 (254) SAE net	Challenger R/T only
V8	Chrysler Hemi	426 cu in (7.0 L); Hemi	R	2× 4-barrel	Dual	10.25:1	1970	425 (317) SAE gross	Challenger R/T only
V8	Chrysler Hemi	426 cu in (7.0 L); Hemi	R	2× 4-barrel	Dual	10.2:1	1971	425 (317) SAE gross, 350 (261) SAE net	Challenger R/T only

=== Production numbers ===
Year	Variant	Model	Production	Total
1970	I6	Hardtop	9,929	76,935
1970	I6	Special Edition	350	76,935
1970	I6	Convertible	378	76,935
1970	V8	Hardtop	36,951	76,935
1970	V8	Special Edition	5,873	76,935
1970	V8	Convertible	2,543	76,935
1970	V8	R/T Hardtop	13,796	76,935
1970	V8	R/T Special Edition	3,753	76,935
1970	V8	R/T Convertible	963	76,935
1970	V8	T/A	2,539	76,935
1971	I6	Hardtop	1,672	26,299
1971	I6	Convertible	83	26,299
1971	V8	Hardtop	18,956	26,299
1971	V8	Convertible	1,774	26,299
1971	V8	R/T	3,814	26,299
1972	I6	Hardtop	842	22,919
1972	V8	Hardtop	15,175	22,919
1972	V8	Rallye	6,902	22,919
1973	V8	Hardtop	27,930	27,930
1974	V8	Hardtop	11,354	11,354

== Racing ==
The Challenger was introduced to the SCCA Trans Am Series in 1970. Two factory-backed cars were prepared by Ray Caldwell's Autodynamics and driven by Sam Posey and Tony Adamowicz. The No.77 car was built at Autodynamics from a street Challenger T/A that was taken from a local dealer showroom. The No.76 chassis arrived mid-season from Dan Gurney's All-American Racers and was completed by Autodynamics.

Dodge's early to mid-1970s factory-supported "Kit Car" program for short-track late-model stock car racing offered a choice of Challenger, and a few (less than 12) were made, but in 1974 Dodge ended the Challenger line and they went to the Dodge Dart Sports and Dodge Aspen bodies over a steel-tube chassis.
