= 金手指 =

金手指 (lit. 'gold', 'finger') may refer to:

- The Goldfinger, 2023 Hong Kong film
- The Informer, 1980 Hong Kong film starring Danny Lee

== See also ==
- The dictionary definition of 金 at Wiktionary
- The dictionary definition of 手 at Wiktionary
- The dictionary definition of 指 at Wiktionary
- Finger (disambiguation)
- Gold (disambiguation)
- Goldfinger (disambiguation)
- Informer (disambiguation)
- 金 (disambiguation)
