= Bushwhackers (disambiguation) =

Bushwhacking was a form of guerrilla warfare during the American Revolutionary War, War of 1812, and American Civil War.

Bushwhacker(s), Bushwacker(s), or Bushwhacking may also refer to:

- Bushwacker (bull), #13/6, hall of fame bucking bull
- Bushwacker (cocktail), a rum and coffee-liqueur
- Bushwacker (comics), a comic book character
- Bushwacker (dragster), a race car
- Buschwhacker, a NASCAR racing term
- Bushwackers Drum and Bugle Corps, a drum and bugle corps in Princeton, New Jersey
- The Bushwhackers (band), Australian folk band in the 1950s
- The Bushwackers (band), Australian folk and country band founded in 1971
- The Bushwhackers (1925 film), an Australian silent film
- The Bushwhackers (1952 film), an American Western film
- The Bushwhackers, a professional wrestling team from New Zealand
- Earthside, an American heavy metal band initially known as Bushwhack
- Millwall Bushwackers, hooligan firm
- Off-trail hiking

== See also ==
- Bushwhacked (disambiguation)
