= Goldfinger =

Goldfinger may refer to:

== James Bond ==
- Goldfinger (novel), a 1959 James Bond novel written by Ian Fleming
  - Goldfinger (film), a 1964 James Bond film starring Sean Connery
    - Goldfinger (soundtrack), the soundtrack to the film composed by John Barry
    - "Goldfinger" (Shirley Bassey song), the title song of the film performed by Shirley Bassey
  - Auric Goldfinger, the eponymous villain of the novel and film Goldfinger
  - James Bond 007: Goldfinger, a 1986 videogame; see James Bond in video games
  - Goldfinger (adventure), a 1983 adventure scenario for the role-playing game James Bond 007

== Music ==
- Goldfinger (band), an American punk rock band
  - Goldfinger (album), the 1996 first album by Goldfinger
- "Goldfinger" (Ash song), 1996
- "Goldfinger", a song by Die Krupps from Volle Kraft voraus!

== People ==
- Goldfinger (surname)

=== People with the nickname ===
- Andrew Gilding (born 1970), English darts player
- Samaresh Jung (born 1970), Indian sport shooter
- John Palmer (criminal) (1950–2015), British criminal

== Other uses ==
- Goldfinger (dragster), an early slingshot dragster
- Goldfinger banana, a banana cultivar developed in Honduras
- Goldfinger v. Feintuch, a 1930s New York court case concerning secondary boycotts
- The Goldfinger, a 2023 Hong Kong crime drama film
- Edge connector, alternatively called "gold fingers"

== See also ==
- 金手指 (disambiguation)
