= Goldfinger (surname) =

Goldfinger is a surname. Notable people with the surname include:

- Arnon Goldfinger (born 1963), film director
- Buddy "Goldfinger" Schaub, an American musician and member of the band Less Than Jake
- Chris Goldfinger, former BBC Radio 1 disc jockey (1996–2009)
- Eliot Goldfinger, an American artist
- Ernő Goldfinger (1902–1987), Hungarian-born Jewish architect and designer of furniture
- Sarah Goldfinger, television writer and producer
- Yair Goldfinger, IT manager

Fictional characters:

- Auric Goldfinger, the eponymous villain of the novel and film Goldfinger

== See also ==
- Goldfinger (disambiguation)
