= Bushwhacked =

Bushwhacked may refer to:

- Bushwhacked (film), a 1995 film starring Daniel Stern, Brad Sullivan, and Corey Carrier
- Bushwhacked!, an Australian children's adventure television series
- Bushwhacked: Life in George W. Bush's America, book by Molly Ivins and Lou Dubose
- "Bushwhacked" (Firefly), the third episode of science-fiction television series Firefly

== See also ==
- Bushwhackers (disambiguation)
