= Jeep Wrangler (JL) =

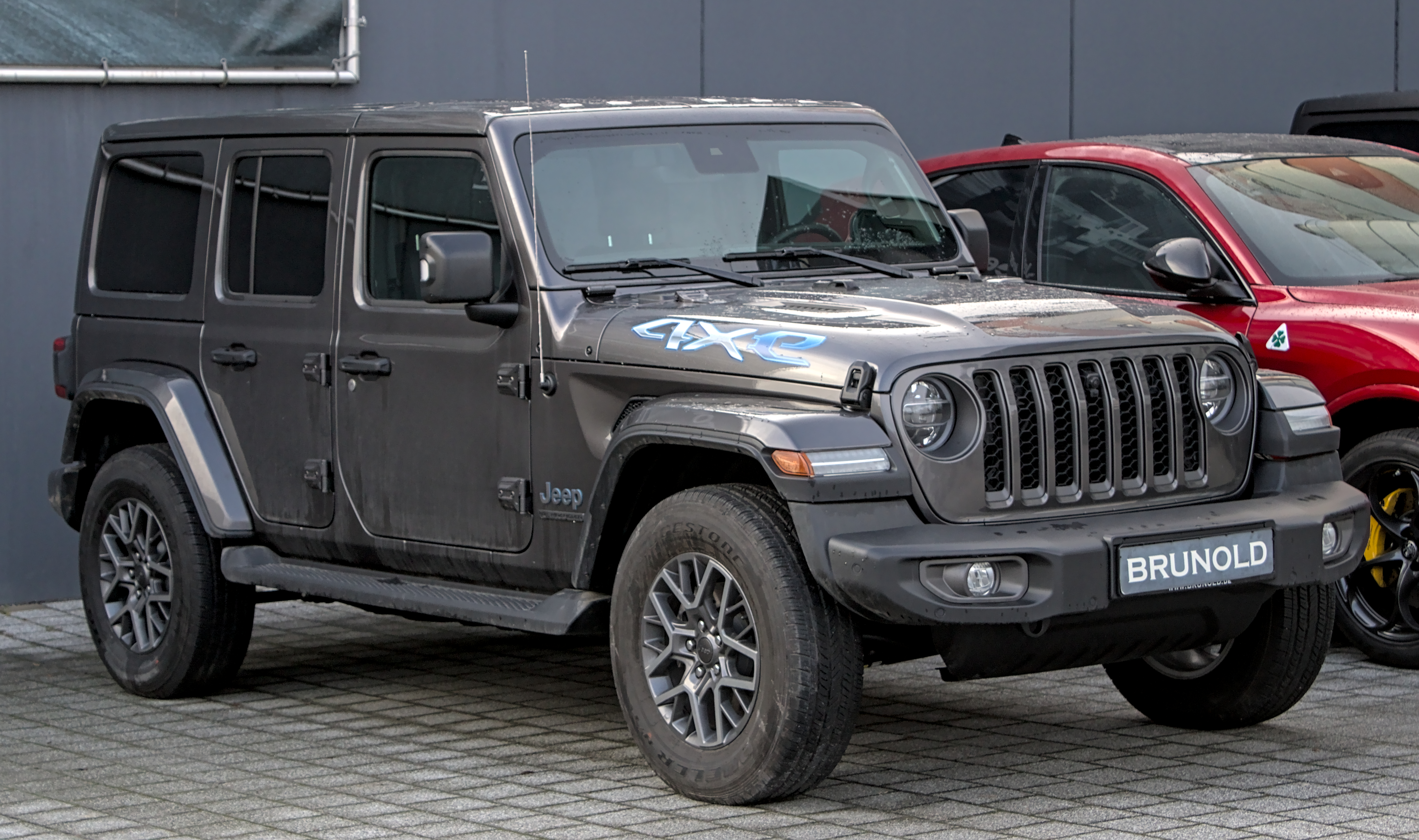
- 2021 Jeep Wrangler Unlimited PHEV

Overview
- Manufacturer: Jeep
- Model code: JL
- Production: November 2017–present
- Model years: 2018–present
- Assembly: United States: Toledo, Ohio (Toledo Complex); India: Ranjangaon, Maharashtra (FIAPL)

Body and chassis
- Class: Mid-size SUV
- Body style: 2-door convertible SUV with removable roof and doors 4-door convertible SUV with removable roof and doors
- Layout: FR/F4
- Related: Jeep Gladiator (JT)

Powertrain
- Engine: Gasoline: 2.0 L GME T4 turbo I4; 3.6 L Pentastar V6; 6.4 L Hemi V8; Gasoline plug-in hybrid: 2.0 L GME T4 turbo I4 (4xe, 2021–2025); Diesel: 2.2 L Multijet II turbo I4; 3.0 L EcoDiesel turbo V6
- Electric motor: 33 kW (44 hp; 45 PS) FCA IPMSM + 100 kW (134 hp; 136 PS) integrated transmission-traction motor (PHEV); 12 hp (8.9 kW) Continental (MHEV)
- Transmission: 6-speed Aisin AL6 manual; 8-speed Torqueflite 850RE automatic; 8-speed ZF 8HP75 automatic
- Hybrid drivetrain: 4xe plug-in hybrid (PHEV) eTorque belted alternator starter mild hybrid (MHEV)
- Battery: 17.4 kWh, lithium-ion (PHEV); 0.43 kWh, 48 V lithium-ion (MHEV)
- Range: 370 miles (600 km) (PHEV)
- Electric range: 21 miles (34 km) (PHEV)
- Plug-in charging: 7.7 kW AC; 3.6 kW AC V2L

Dimensions
- Wheelbase: 96.8 in (2,459 mm) (2-door); 118.4 in (3,007 mm) (4-door)
- Length: 166.8 in (4,237 mm) (2-door); 188.4 in (4,785 mm) (4-door)
- Width: 73.9 in (1,877 mm)
- Height: 70.9 in (1,801 mm)
- Curb weight: 3,948–5,103 lb (1,791–2,315 kg)

Chronology
- Predecessor: Jeep Wrangler (JK)

The Jeep Wrangler (JL) is the fourth generation of the Wrangler off-road vehicle, available in two- and four-door body styles. Unveiled at the 2017 Los Angeles Auto Show on November 29, 2017, production of the vehicle began in November 2017.

== Design ==
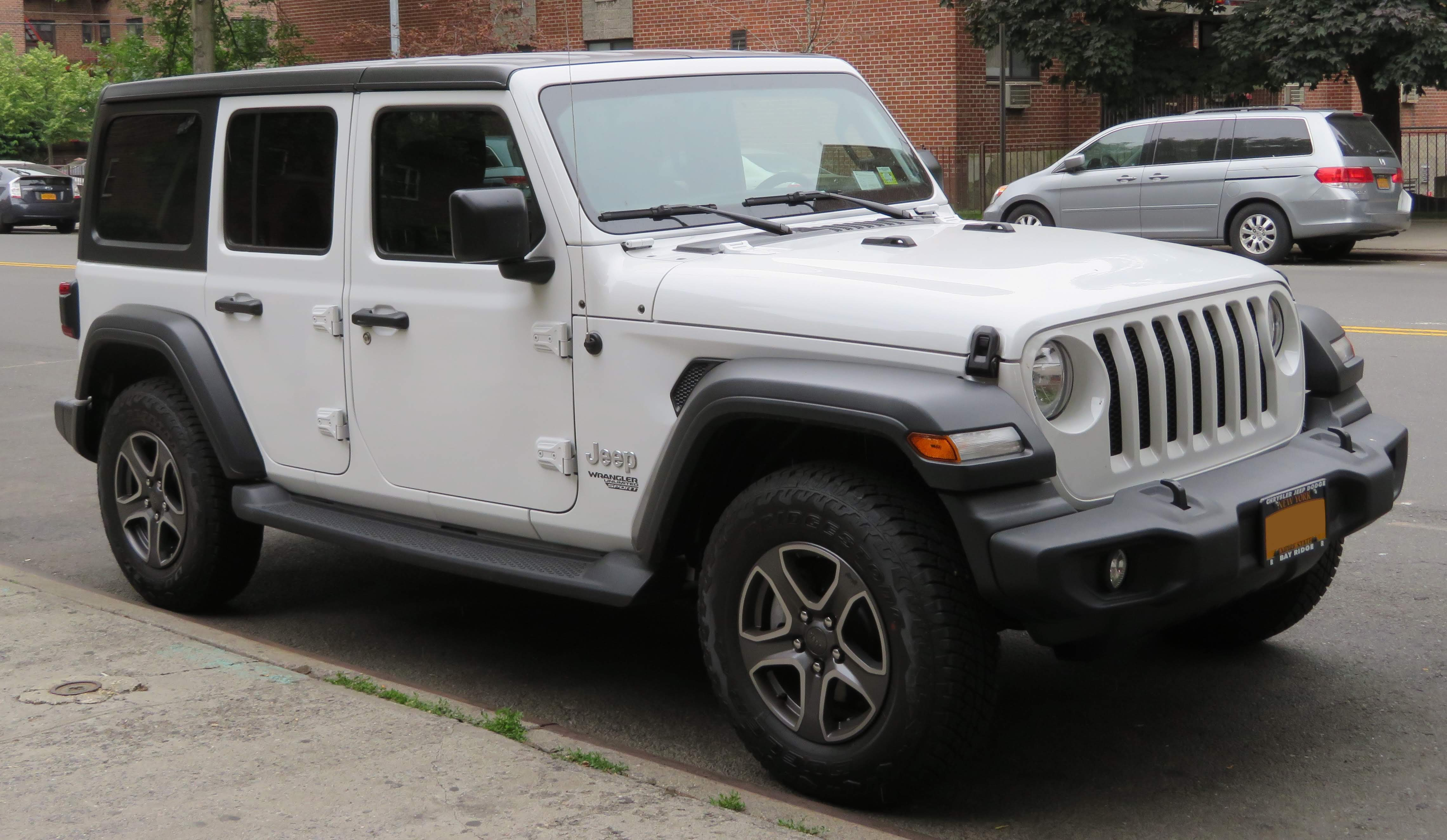
Unlimited Sport

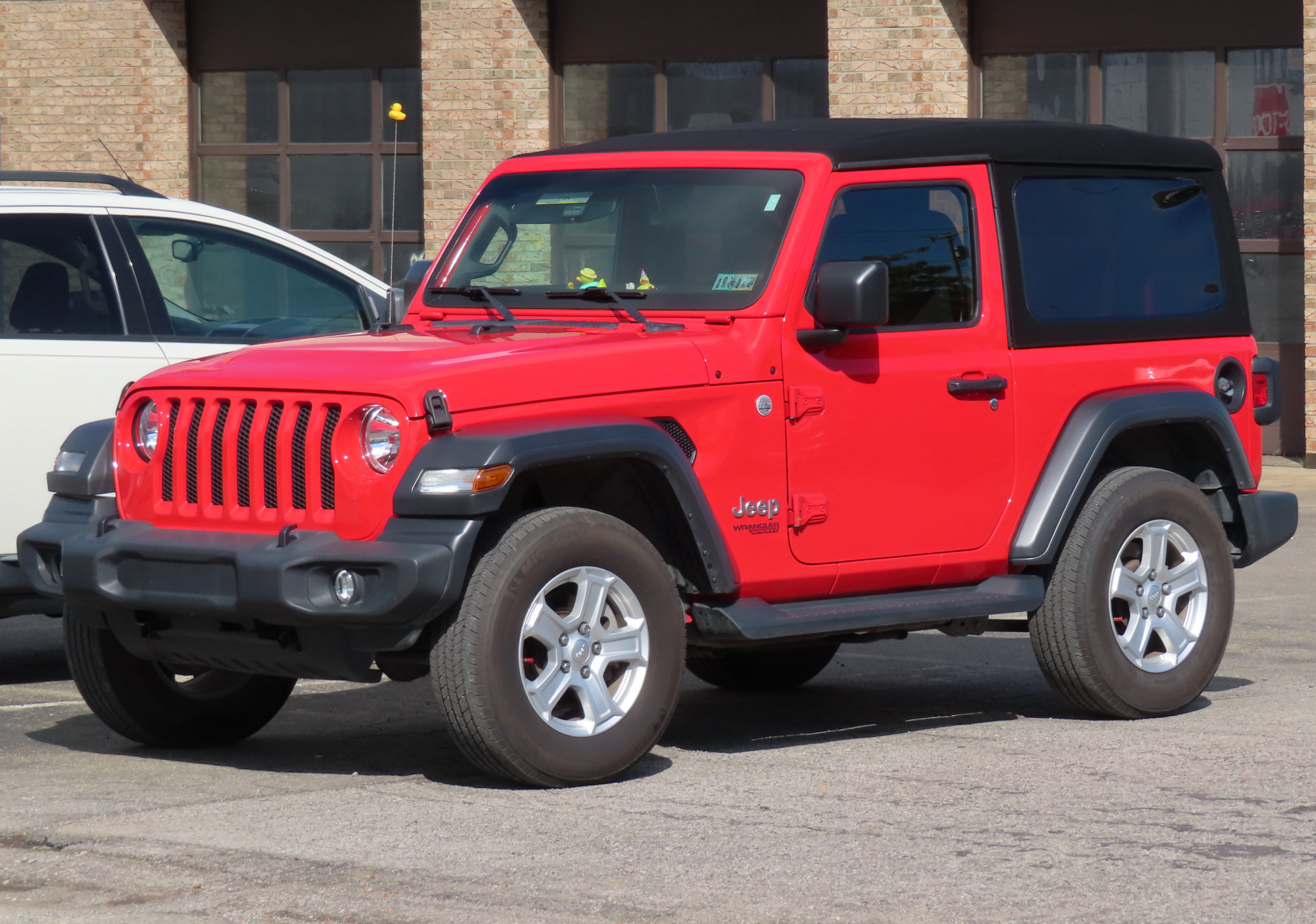
2018 Jeep Wrangler Sport S 2-door

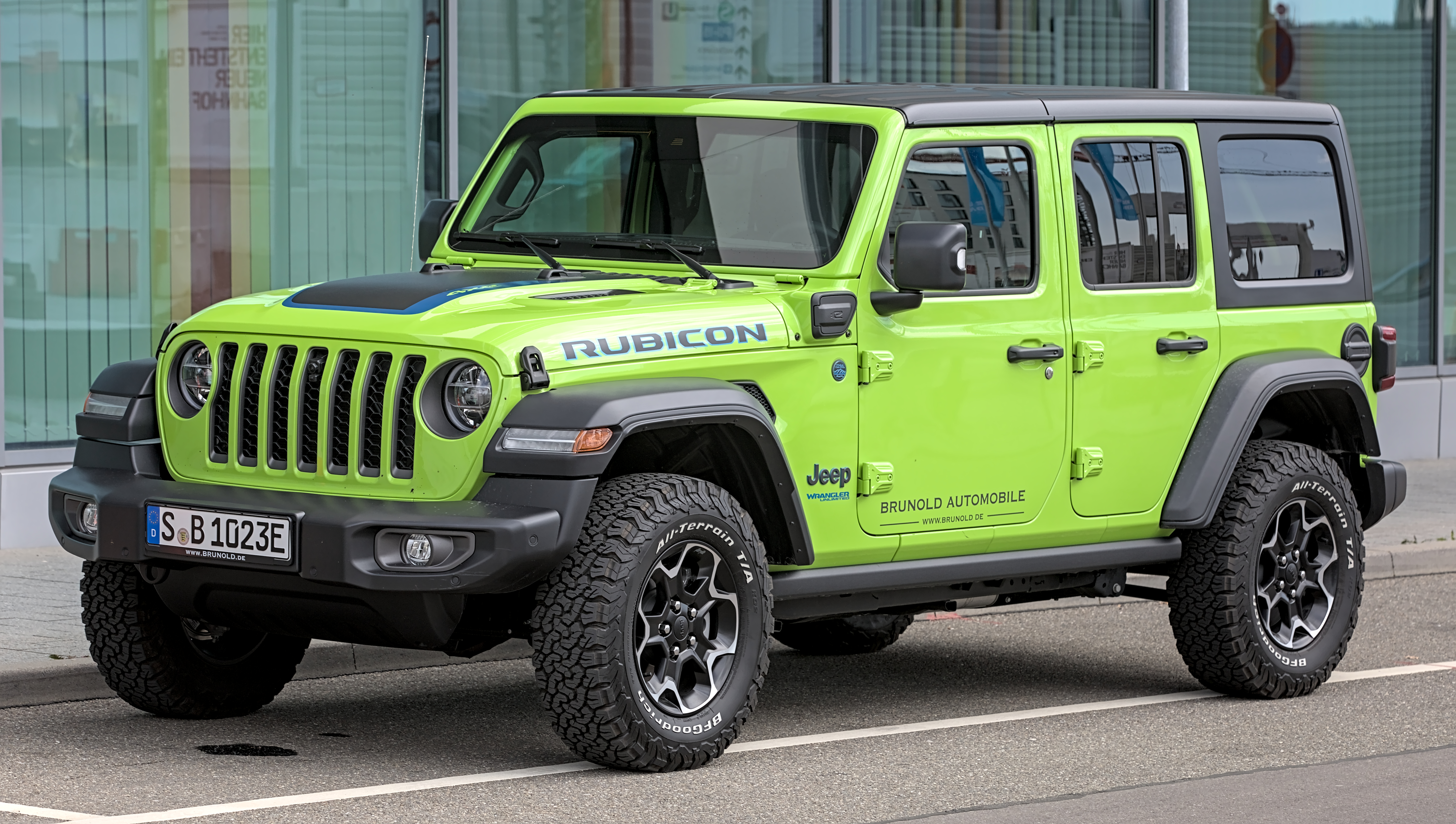
Rubicon

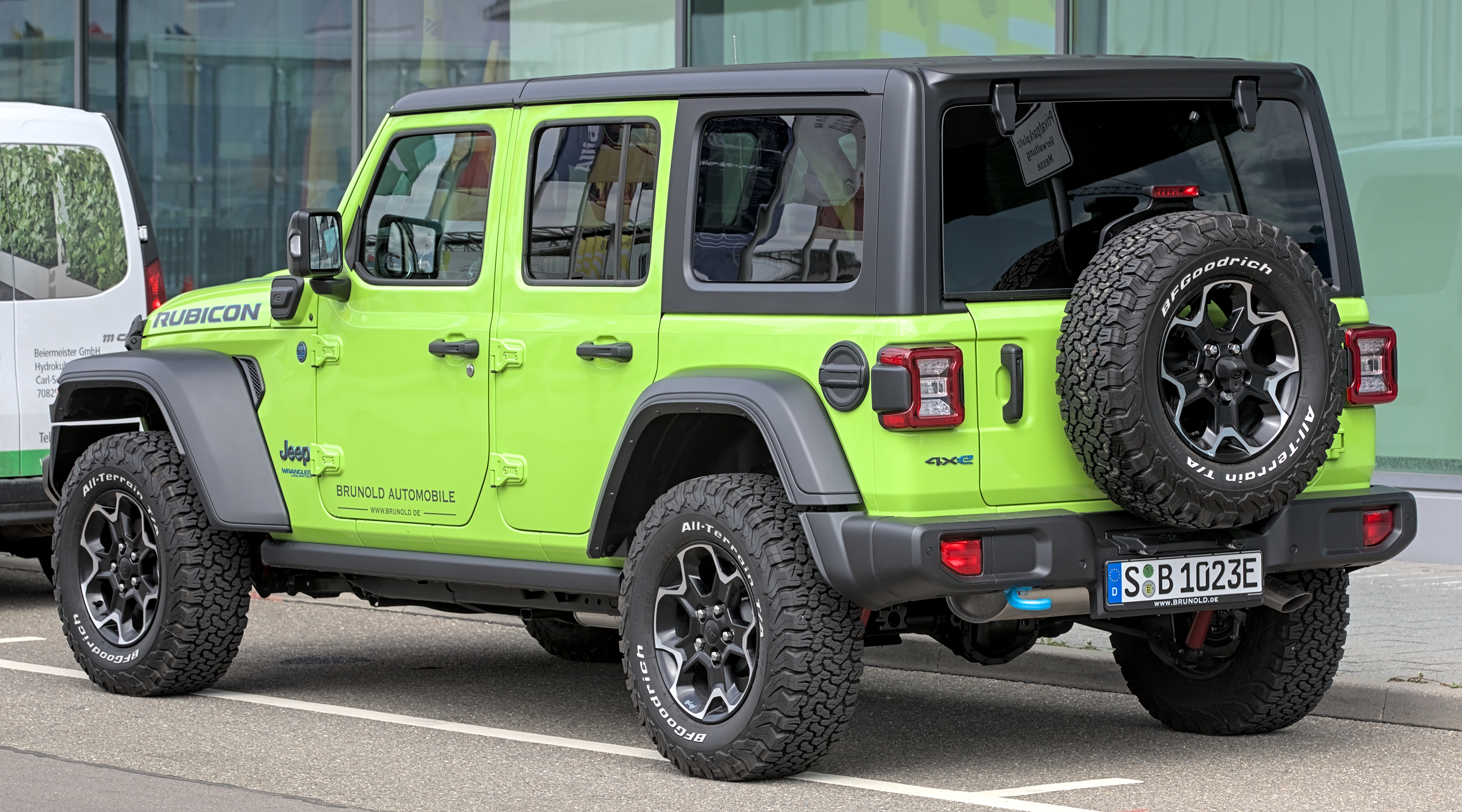
Rubicon 2026 USA Model

The 2-door Wrangler and 4-door Wrangler Unlimited feature an exterior design that is reminiscent of the 1997 through 2006 Wrangler (TJ), with a "raked" front grille with seven vertical slots and round headlamps that integrate into the front grille. The designers have moved the traditional Jeep logo off the grille.

The Wrangler has retained a body-on-frame construction and solid axles. The vehicle is offered with three different four-wheel drive systems: Command-Trac, Selec-Trac, and Rock-Trac. Options available on all JL models (except Rubicon) include an anti-spin rear differential. The JL is designed to be more comfortable on-road and has recirculating ball steering with electric power assistance.

The Wrangler is 2.5 inches (64 mm) longer overall than before, while the Wrangler Unlimited has grown by 3.5 inches (89 mm). The new Wrangler is roughly 90 kilograms (198 lb) lighter than the Wrangler JK. Overhangs increase significantly with the new model having 29.2 and 40.8 inches (740 and 1,040 mm) front and rear.

The 2024 facelift can be optioned with 35-inch beadlock-capable tires and has official support for 40-inch tires.

== Powertrain ==
The 3.6 L Pentastar VVT V6 gasoline engine remains available from the existing Wrangler and Wrangler Unlimited, and is standard on all models, though it has been redesigned for improved fuel economy. The engine features an Aisin AL6 six-speed manual transmission as standard equipment, with an 850RE Torqueflite eight-speed automatic transmission being optional. The automatic transmission made its debut in the 2018 Jeep Grand Cherokee (WK2), replacing the older Torqueflite 845RE unit. The eight-speed automatic unit will feature a traditional shifter. The engine performance is unchanged from the previous model at 285 hp (213 kW; 289 PS) and 260 lb⋅ft (353 N⋅m). The Pentastar V6 is only offered on Wrangler models sold in North America, Middle East, Australia, and New Zealand. The new engine features an optional mild hybrid system branded as eTorque for improved fuel economy and off-road performance.

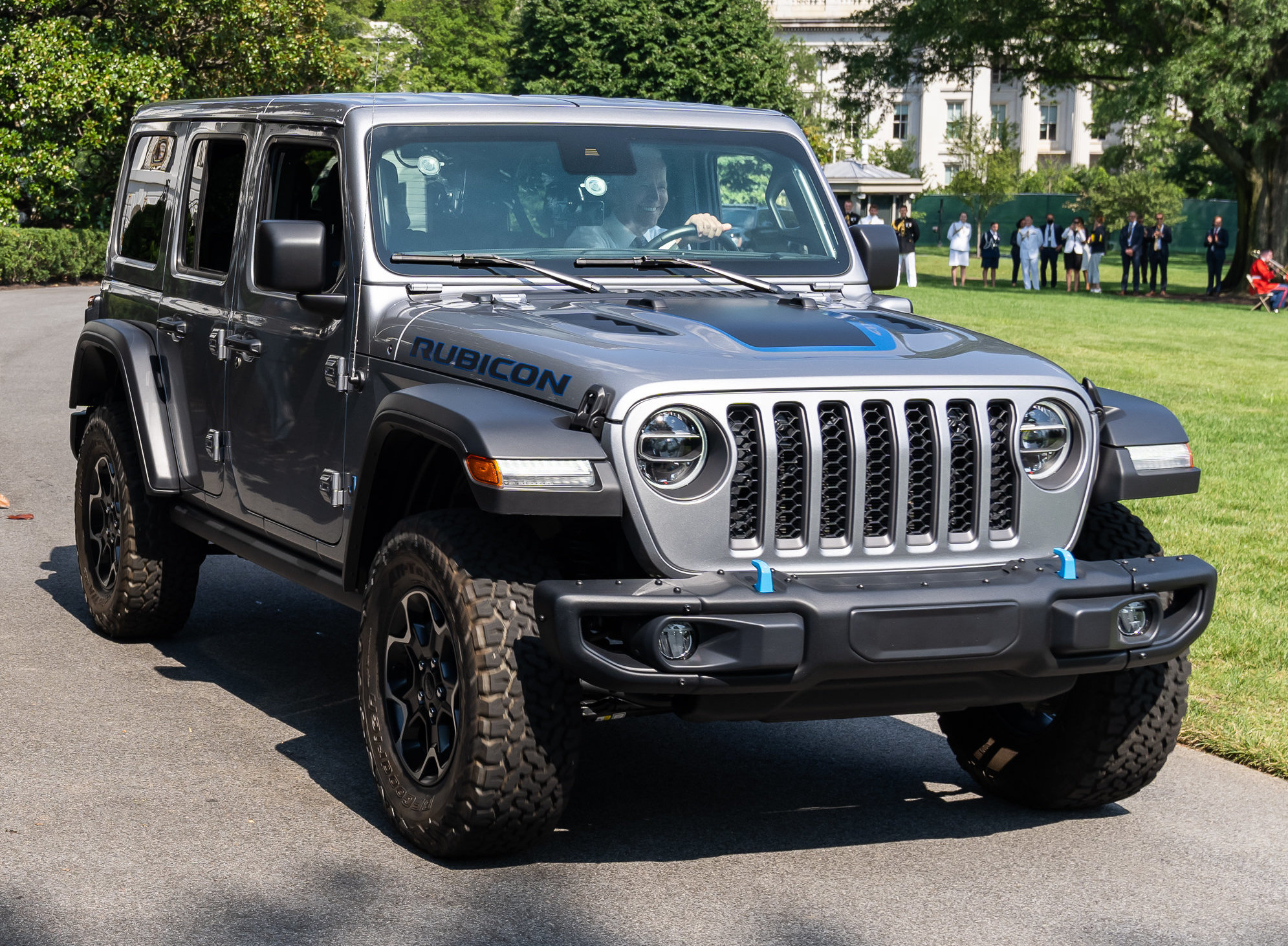
President Joe Biden driving the Wrangler Rubicon 4xe plug-in hybrid at the White House

A 2.0 L turbocharged four-cylinder (Inline-4) FCA Global Medium Engine is available on all models. Paired exclusively with the 850RE Torqueflite eight-speed automatic transmission and including the eTorque system, the engine produces 270 hp (201 kW; 274 PS) and 295 lb⋅ft (400 N⋅m) combined. This is the only gasoline engine offered in Europe, China, Singapore, and India. In North America, this engine had late availability, and the Wrangler was launched with the existing 3.6 L Pentastar V6 gasoline engine. Jeep cancelled the 2.0L eTorque hybrid in 2020.

A 3.0 L EcoDiesel V6 turbodiesel engine, built by VM Motori, became available in North America in 2020 (same engine already available in the Jeep Grand Cherokee (WK2) and the Ram 1500. It produces 260 hp (194 kW; 264 PS) and 600 N⋅m (443 lb⋅ft).

For the rest of the world (except North America) a 2.2 L 16V Multijet II turbo four-cylinder diesel engine producing 197 hp (147 kW; 200 PS) and 450 N⋅m (332 lb⋅ft) with Start&Stop is available.

A plug-in hybrid model called the Wrangler 4xe was released in 2021. Power and torque ratings are 375 hp (280 kW; 380 PS) horsepower and 470 lb⋅ft (637 N⋅m) of torque. It uses a 17 kWh (61 MJ) lithium-ion battery pack that gives it an EPA-estimated range of 21 miles (34 km) and an EPA-rated 49 MPGe. It is available in China, Europe, and the United States. For 2022, the 4xe became the only variant of the Wrangler offered in Europe. In 2025, Stellantis discontinued the Jeep Wrangler 4xe from the US market (along with the Dodge Hornet, Chrysler Pacifica Plug-in Hybrid, and Jeep Grand Cherokee 4xe) due to poor sales and loss of federal EV tax credits. Stellantis also cancelled plans of launching a 4xe version of the Jeep Gladiator pickup truck and an all-electric version of the Ram 1500 pickup truck due to these same reasons. Instead, Stellantis will focus its alternative fuel powered vehicle offerings on mild hybrid and range-extended electric vehicles for the US market.

A V8 powered version of the Rubicon trim level debuted for the 2021 model year. This trim goes by Rubicon 392 and produces 470 hp (350 kW; 477 PS) horsepower and 470 lb⋅ft (637 N⋅m) of torque from the 392 cu in (6.4 L) HEMI V8 also found in Dodge's Scat Pack Charger alongside Jeep's own SRT Grand Cherokee.

== In-vehicle infotainment ==
There are three updated infotainment systems (Uconnect 3 5.0BT, Uconnect 4 7.0, and Uconnect 4C 8.4N). The different Uconnect infotainment systems supply 5-inch, 7-inch, or 8.4-inch pinch-to-zoom displays.

The base Sport and upgraded Sport S both feature the standard Uconnect 3 5.0BT system, while the uplevel Sahara and Rubicon both feature the Uconnect 4 7.0 system with Apple CarPlay and Android Auto, which is also optional on the upgraded Sport S, when equipped with the Electronic Infotainment Group. The Uconnect 4C 8.4N system is only available on the uplevel Sahara and Rubicon models when equipped with the Electronic Infotainment II Group. SiriusXM Satellite Radio is standard on all models aside from the base Sport, where it is available as a standalone option.

An eight-speaker audio system, with dashboard and rear "sound bar" mounted speakers is standard on all models, whereas an optional nine-speaker Alpine premium amplified audio system that adds an all-weather subwoofer, is a standalone option on all models, also included with the Electronic Infotainment Group and Infotainment II Group on Sport S, Sahara, and Rubicon models.

All three infotainment systems include a fully integrated and federally mandated rear-view backup camera as standard equipment. The camera is mounted to the spare tire and can be disconnected when the tire is removed.

Rear passengers now get a 115 V AC household-style power outlet, as well as rear USB charging ports on Wrangler Unlimited models.

== Interior ==
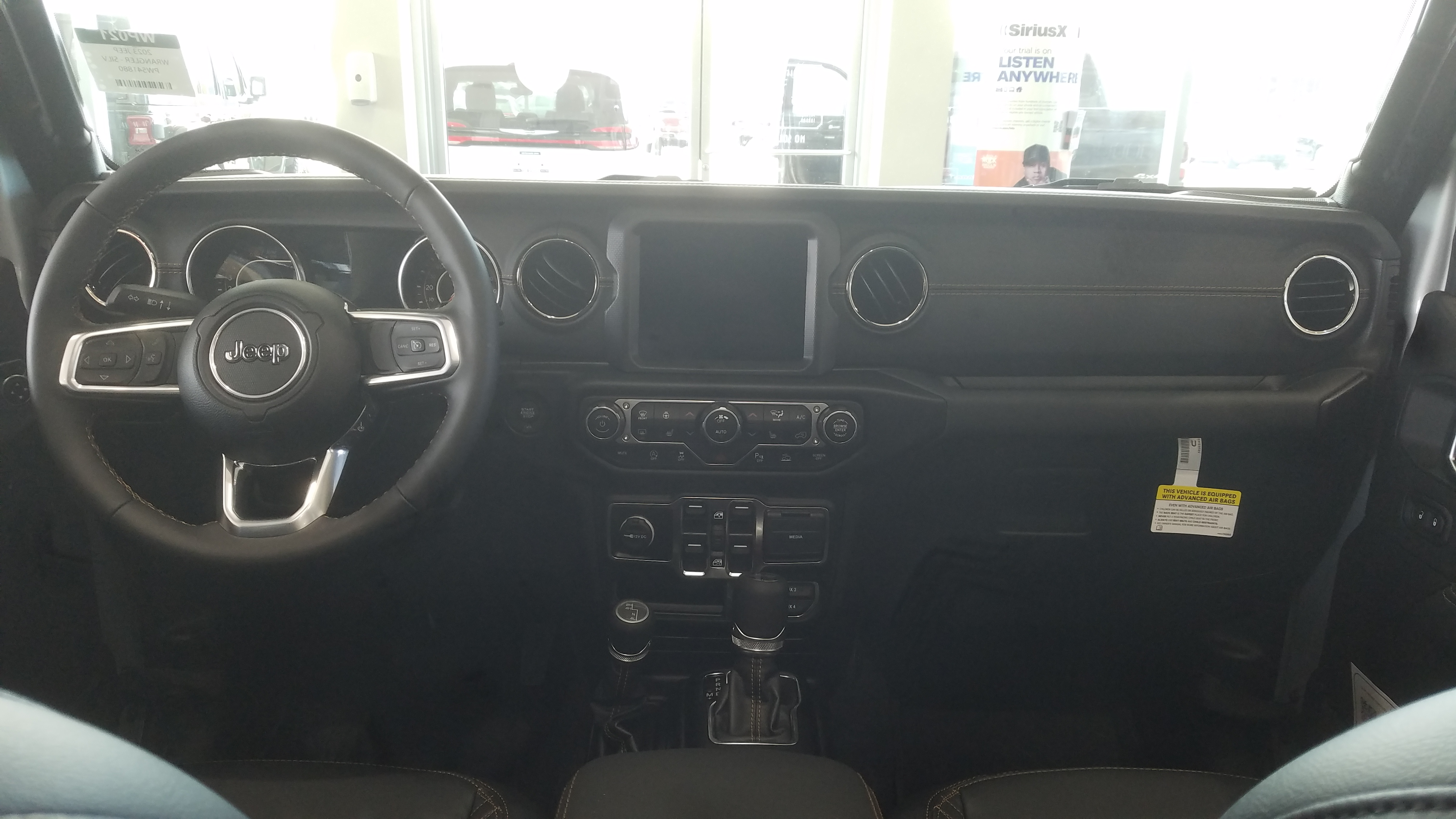
Interior

The interior design was inspired by the 1954–1983 Jeep CJ-5 and 1987–1995 Wrangler (YJ) models. The majority of the interior switchgear in the JL is unique to the JL, except for some parts which are shared with other Chrysler products.

The power window controls remain in the center of the instrument panel, and the front woofers remain in the lower corners of the instrument panel. There is a new three-spoke, retro-inspired steering wheel, and a color instrument cluster display screen is available on upper-level trims.

Standard cloth seating surfaces are standard on Sport and Sport "S", while upgraded Premium Cloth seating surfaces are standard on Sahara and Rubicon models (the upgraded seats include either 'SAHARA' or 'RUBICON' embroidery on the front seat backrests, depending on model). Luxury leather-trimmed seating surfaces are standard on the MOAB and 392 trim level, and optional only on Sahara and Rubicon models (the front seat backrests are also embroidered with either the 'SAHARA', 'MOAB', 'RUBICON', or 'RUBICON 392' logos, depending on model). Interior colors are either Black or Heritage Tan for cloth-equipped models, or Black or Saddle on leather-equipped models. All models can be equipped with heated front seats and a heated leather-wrapped steering wheel. Rubicon models equipped with the Black interior include exclusive red stitching on the seats and steering wheel, while Moab models feature contrasting gray stitching, and the 392 has bronze stitching. Black Katzkin leather-trimmed seating surfaces are available as a Mopar dealer-installed accessory option for all trim levels, in either standard or perforated trim.

Cloth-equipped models include a painted dashboard surface (Silver-painted on Sport, Sport "S", and Sahara models, and Red-painted on some Rubicon models, dependent on the exterior color choice). Leather-equipped Sahara and MOAB include an interior color-keyed stitched vinyl dashboard.

== Safety ==
Safety improvements include standard side-impact airbags and strengthened B-pillars. Driver-assist safety features are located in the Active Safety group.

The JL has a lowered beltline with larger windows for better outward visibility. The rear spare tire has been moved down to increase rear visibility. LED front headlamps and rear tail lamps are available, as are daytime running lamps (DRLs) on the front fenders. A blind spot monitor is built directly into the taillight housing.

=== ANCAP ===
ANCAP test results* Jeep Wrangler all variants (2018, aligned with Euro NCAP)
Test	Points	%
Overall:	1 /5 stars	
Adult occupant:	19.2	50%
Child occupant:	39.3	80%
Pedestrian:	23.8	49%
Safety assist:	4.2	32%

ANCAP test results* Jeep Wrangler all variants (2019, aligned with Euro NCAP)
Test	Points	%
Overall:	3 /5 stars	
Adult occupant:	23	60%
Child occupant:	39.3	80%
Pedestrian:	23.8	49%
Safety assist:	6.6	51%

=== Euro NCAP ===
The JL received 1 star from Euro NCAP in 2018.

=== IIHS ===
In 2020, a 4-door JL Wrangler Unlimited overturned upon impact with the rigid barrier during the IIHS's 40-mph small overlap test. When the vehicle struck the barrier, the front axle tucked underneath the Wrangler's structure, causing the vehicle to ride over its own axle and land on its side. While the Wrangler's structure had minimal intrusion and the dummy had minor injury readings, the IIHS concluded that the risk of a passenger being ejected from the vehicle was too high and gave the Wrangler a "Marginal" rating. Despite claims from Jeep that the JL Wrangler's structure was modified to prevent the same outcome, the vehicle overturned again during a retest for the 2022 model, despite some minor suspension changes, resulting in another "Marginal" rating.

The 2022 Wrangler was safety tested by the IIHS:

IIHS Wrangler scores (2022):
Small overlap front (Driver)	Marginal	
Moderate overlap front	Good	
Moderate overlap front (updated test)	Poor	
Side (original test)	Good	
Side (updated test)	Marginal	
Roof strength	Good	
Head restraints and seats	Good	
Headlights	Marginal / Poor	varies by trim/option
Front crash prevention (Vehicle-to-Vehicle)	Superior	optional
Seat belt reminders	Marginal	
Child seat anchors (LATCH) ease of use	Good+	

== Production ==
Production of the Wrangler Unlimited began in November 2017, while two-door Wrangler production commenced in early 2018. As with its predecessors, the JL is produced at Jeep's Toledo Complex in Toledo, Ohio, and was also produced alongside its predecessor, the Wrangler JK, which remained in production until April 27, 2018. The simultaneous sales were to ensure that dealerships could meet demand. The 2018 Wrangler JK was virtually unchanged from the 2017 model, and a Wrangler JK decal on the front fenders distinguished the outgoing model from its successor. The plant which produced the JK will temporarily close as it receives a retooling for the upcoming Wrangler-based Jeep Gladiator.

FCA announced that the Toledo Machining Plant would assemble the power electronics module and components for the Jeep Wrangler Plug-in Hybrid, which was intended to be launched in 2020, but was actually presented in 2021.

== Marketing ==
Before the JL's actual debut at the 2017 Los Angeles Auto Show, the song "Believer" by Imagine Dragons was used in the opening. In the teaser, it uses 7 letters that are narrowed to represent the 7 vertical slots and 2 circles on the left and right to depict the front fascia.

A debut television advertisement for the 2018 Wrangler JL, entitled "Jeep Jurassic", first aired during Super Bowl LII. The ad is a reenactment of the classic Tyrannosaurus rex chase scene from the 1993 film Jurassic Park. However, instead of a 1992 Wrangler (YJ) Sahara Edition, Jeff Goldblum, who played Ian Malcolm in the film, drives a silver two-door 2018 Wrangler JL Rubicon with red accents. The commercial ends with Goldblum seated in the driver's seat in a showroom, where a saleswoman asks if he would like to take the JL for a test drive, to which Goldblum replies that he has.

== Pickup trucks ==
The all-new 2020 Jeep Gladiator was introduced at the 2018 Los Angeles Auto Show on November 28, 2018. Based on the Wrangler JL, the Gladiator features exterior and interior styling cues similar to the Wrangler Unlimited, seating for five passengers, and a five-foot pickup bed.

The Jeep Scrambler was announced in May 2026 as part of Stellantis' FastLane 2030 plan, named after the original Jeep CJ-8 Scramber. It has two doors, four seats, independent front suspension; a first for a Wrangler. At the 2026 SEMA Show a Scrambler SRT concept was shown.

== Awards and recognition ==
- Autotrader's Must Test Drive Award
- 2019 SUV of the Year for Jeep Wrangler Rubicon by Four Wheeler
- Northwest Automotive Press Association's Northwest Outdoor Activity Vehicle of the Year for Jeep Wrangler Unlimited
- "Off-road Utility Vehicle" and "Midsize SUV" of Texas by the Texas Auto Writers Association
- Highest Resale Value in the Compact SUV segment by J.D. Power
- SEMA 4x4/SUV of the Year by the Specialty Equipment Market Association (SEMA)
- Motor Trend's SUV of the Year.
- ALG Residual Value Award for Off-Road Utility segment

== Refresh (2024) ==
For the 2024 model year, the Jeep Wrangler and Wrangler Unlimited JL received a mid-cycle refresh. On the exterior, all models receive new tire and wheel combinations, as well as the front grille that originally debuted on the 2023 Rubicon 20th Anniversary Edition (the Sport and the Sport "S" trims retain the original front grille). Both 2-door and 4-door Unlimited models receive a new Rubicon "X" trim, which contains all of the previously optional equipment on the Rubicon (the standard Rubicon trim no longer offers these features). The Unlimited 4xe, which received a lower-priced Willys model for 2023, gains a new base-model Sport "S" trim for 2024. Inside, all Wrangler models now receive a standard U Connect 5 twelve-inch infotainment system with wired and wireless Apple CarPlay and Android Auto smartphone integration and Jeep Connect with 4G LTE Wi-Fi connectivity, with optional GPS navigation, a built-in off-road trail guide, HD Radio, SiriusXM Satellite Radio with 360L, and a nine-speaker Alpine premium sound system with an amplifier and a weatherproof subwoofer. The center stack is redesigned to accept the larger touchscreen, which removes the genuine metal dashboard trim, as well as replaces the previous round air vents with horizontal rectangular units. Most models receive the premium Sun Rider soft top roof as standard equipment, while other models receive a standard color-keyed Freedom Top three-piece hard top roof and color-keyed front and rear fender flares. All Wrangler models equipped with the six-speed manual or eight-speed automatic transmissions now require the 2.0L "Hurricane" turbocharged inline four-cylinder (I4) gasoline engine, except for the Sahara, High Altitude, Rubicon, and Rubicon X trims, which all offer the 3.6L Pentastar V6 gasoline engine with the automatic transmission. The previous 3.0L EcoDiesel turbocharged diesel V6 engine has been discontinued for 2024. Two previously available exterior paint colors return as "special-edition" options for 2024: Punk'n Metallic (Orange) and Bikini Pearl Coat Metallic (Teal Blue). All models receive automatic air conditioning and climate controls. The refreshed 2024 Wrangler lineup went on sale in the spring of 2023.

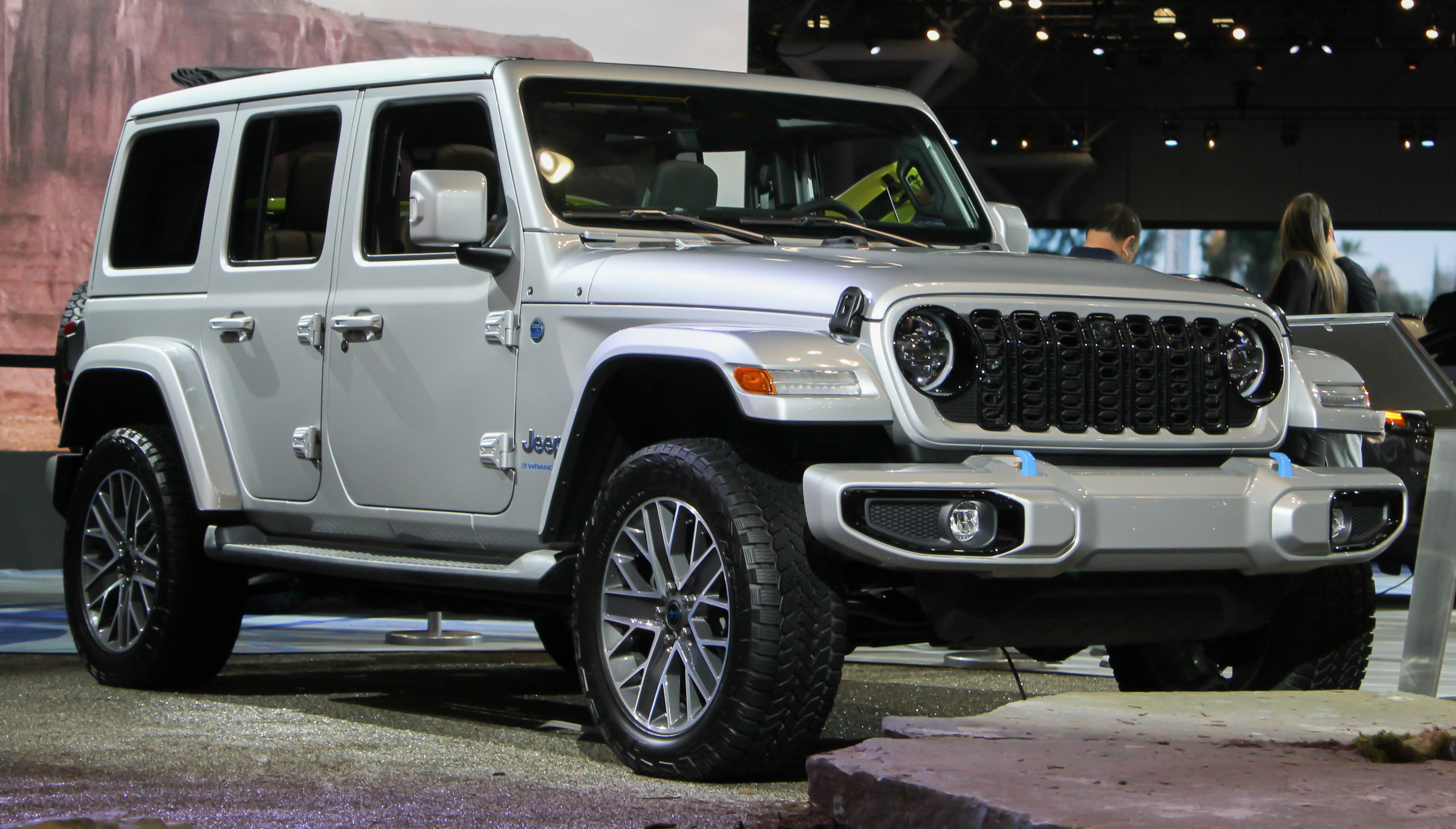
Front view

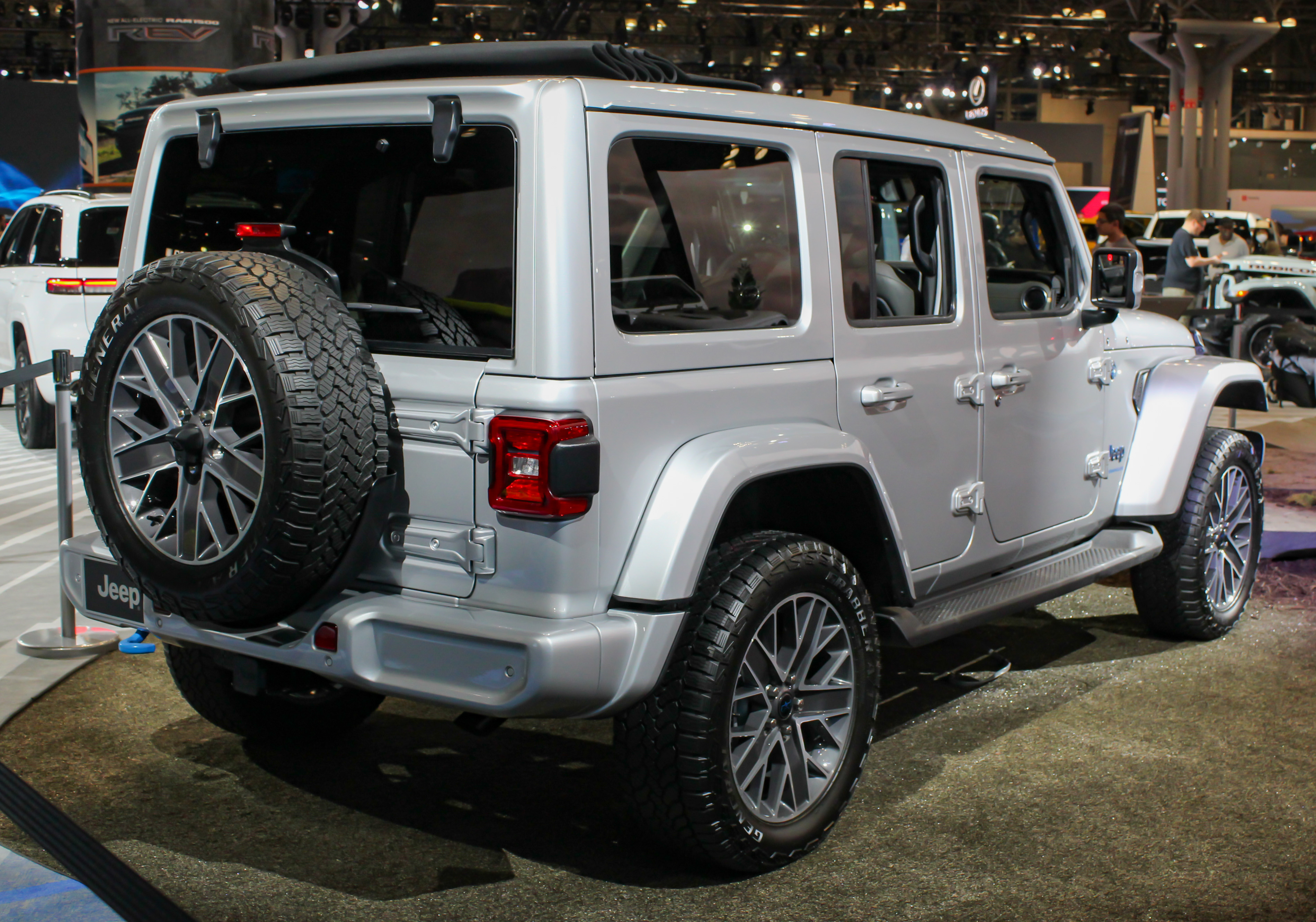
Rear view

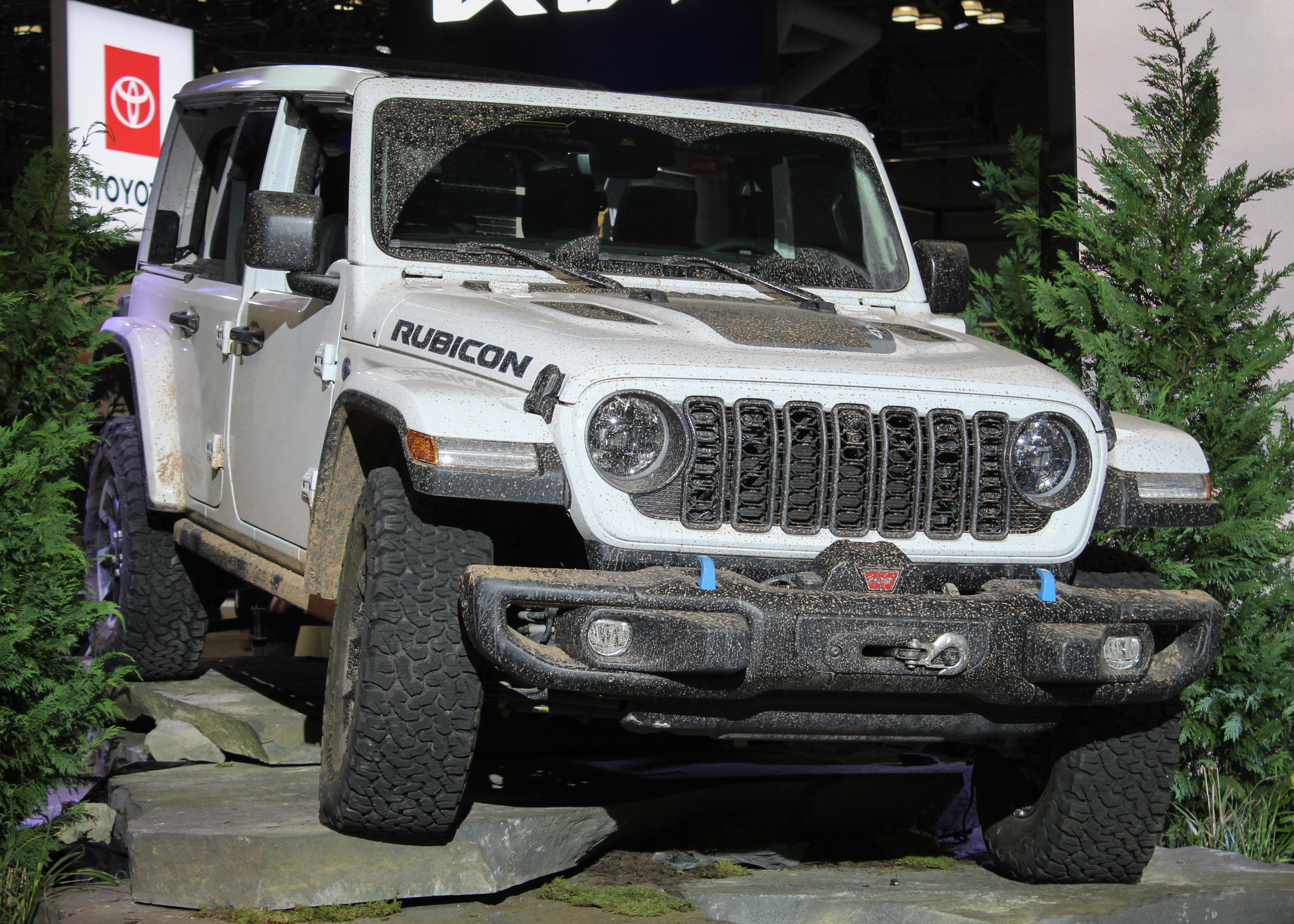
Unlimited Rubicon

== Trims ==
The JL is available in several trim packages:

- Black and Tan
- Freedom
- High Altitude
- High Tide
- Moab
- North Edition
- Rubicon Recon
- Rubicon
- Rubicon X
- Rubicon 392
- Sahara
- Sahara Altitude
- Sport
- Sport S
- Sport Altitude
- Willys Sport
- Willys
