= Polyspheric =

Chrysler Polyspheric

Overview
- Manufacturer: Chrysler
- Also called: Poly; Poly-head; Polydome; Red Ram; Semi-Hemi; Spitfire
- Production: 1955-1958 Mound Road Engine, Detroit, MI

Layout
- Configuration: Naturally aspirated 90° V8
- Displacement: 241.3 cu in (4.0 L); 259.2 cu in (4.2 L); 268.3 cu in (4.4 L); 299.3 cu in (4.9 L); 313.7 cu in (5.1 L); 324.6 cu in (5.3 L); 331.1 cu in (5.4 L); 353.1 cu in (5.8 L)
- Cylinder bore: 3 7/16 in (87.3 mm); 3 9/16 in (90.5 mm); 3 5/8 in (92.1 mm); 3 11/16 in (93.7 mm); 3 13/16 in (96.8 mm); 3 15/16 in (100.0 mm)
- Piston stroke: 3 1/4 in (82.6 mm); 3 5/8 in (92.1 mm); 3.80 in (96.5 mm)
- Cylinder block material: Cast iron
- Cylinder head material: Cast iron
- Valvetrain: OHV 2 valves x cyl.

Combustion
- Fuel system: Carburetor
- Fuel type: Gasoline
- Oil system: Wet sump
- Cooling system: Water-cooled

Output
- Power output: 310 hp (231 kW)

Chronology
- Predecessor: Chrysler flathead six
- Successor: Chrysler A engine

The Polyspheric engines were V8 engines produced by Chrysler from 1955 to 1958 as lower-cost alternatives to its Hemi engines. These engines were based on the Hemi engines, using the same blocks and crankshaft parts, but completely different cylinder heads, pushrods, exhaust manifolds and pistons.

They were called Polyspheric or Poly engines, because they featured polyspherical-shaped (meaning "more than one sphere") combustion chambers. These were formed by two shallow concave domes where the intake and exhaust valve seats were.

Because these engines needed a less sophisticated rocker setup than a true hemi, with only a single rocker shaft in each head, they were also cheaper to produce and lighter. In the Chrysler literature, the Poly engines were also called single rocker shaft (SRS), while the Hemi engines were called dual rocker shaft (DRS).

These engines replaced Chrysler's flathead inline-six in the division's lower-priced cars, and were themselves gradually replaced by the Chrysler A engine beginning in mid-1956.

== Dodge and Plymouth ==
Dodge and Plymouth both offered Poly versions of Dodge's Hemi engine. The Dodge versions were marketed as Red Ram or Super Red Ram (internal code A388).

=== 241 ===
The 241 displaced 241.3 cu in (4.0 L; 3,954 cc) and was Plymouth's Poly version of the Dodge's 241 Hemi for 1955. Bore and stroke were the same as for the Dodge engine, at 3 7/16 in (3.4375 in) by 3 1/4 in (3.25 in), respectively (87.3 mm × 82.6 mm). Maximum power claimed was 157 hp (117 kW).

=== 260 ===
The 260, also known as the 259, displaced 259.2 cu in (4.2 L; 4,247 cc) and was introduced in the middle of 1955 by Plymouth. It was a bored-out 241, having a 3 9/16 in (3.5625 in) bore and keeping the 3 1/4 in (3.25 in) stroke (90.5 mm × 82.6 mm). This engine was also used on 1955 and 1956 Dodge trucks. Maximum power claimed was 167 hp (125 kW) with a two-barrel carburetor; a four-barrel version with 177 hp (132 kW) was added later.

=== 270 ===
The 270 displaced 268.3 cu in (4.4 L; 4,397 cc) and was offered in both Plymouths (1956) and Dodges (1955–1956). Like its predecessors, it was a Poly version of Dodge's 270 Hemi. Bore and stroke were the same as the Hemi's at 3 5/8 in (3.625 in) by 3 1/4 in (3.25 in), respectively (92.1 mm × 82.6 mm). Outputs are 180 or 187 hp (134 or 139 kW) depending on fitment.

=== 315 ===
The 315 displaced 313.7 cu in (5.1 L; 5,141 cc) and was a Poly version of Dodge's high-deck 315 Hemi. Bore and stroke were the same at 3.625 in (92.1 mm) by 3.8 in (96.5 mm), respectively. Only used on 1956 Dodges.

=== 325 ===
The 325 displaced 324.6 cu in (5.3 L; 5,320 cc) and was a Poly version of Dodge's largest high-deck 325 Hemi. Bore and stroke were the same at 3 11/16 in (3.69 in; 93.7 mm) by 3.8 in (96.5 mm), respectively. Used on 1957 and 1958 Dodge.

== Chrysler ==
The Spitfire engines were Poly variants of Chrysler's FirePower (Hemi) engine. Chrysler built three Spitfire engines: the 331 Poly, 354 Poly, and the all-new 301 Poly, which did not have a Hemi version. They were introduced for 1955 in the low-priced Chrysler Saratoga and Windsor models and used through 1958.

All Chrysler Spitfire engines were low deck; no Poly version of the raised deck 392 Hemi engine was produced.

=== 301 ===
The 301 displaced 299.3 cu in (4.9 L; 4,905 cc) and was Chrysler's smallest Poly engine. The 301 has a 3.625 in (92.1 mm) bore and a 3.625 in (92.1 mm) stroke.

=== 331 ===
The 331 displaced 331.1 cu in (5.4 L; 5,425 cc) and was a Poly version of Chrysler's 331 Hemi. Bore and stroke were the same at 3 13/16 in (3.8125 in) by 3 5/8 in (3.625 in), respectively (96.8 mm × 92.1 mm).

=== 354 ===
The 354 displaced 353.1 cu in (5.8 L; 5,787 cc) and was a Poly version of Chrysler's 354 Hemi. Bore and stroke were the same at 3 15/16 in (3.9375 in) by 3 5/8 in (3.625 in), respectively (100.0 mm × 92.1 mm). The 1958 Chrysler Saratoga with four-barrel carberutor (58S) was the most powerful at 310 hp (231 kW).
