= 金 (disambiguation) =

金 is Kangxi radical 167.

金 may also refer to:

- Jin dynasty (1115–1234)
- Kim (Korean surname)
- Catty
- Jin (Chinese surname)
