= Chrysler Hemi engine =

Series of V8 engines built by Chrysler

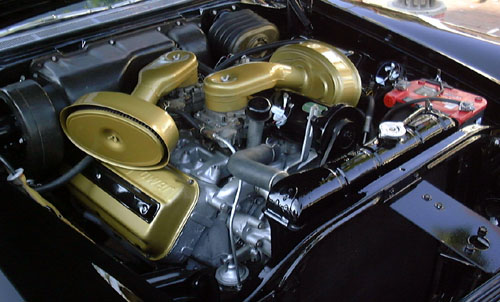
392 cu in (6.4 L) Chrysler Firepower Hemi in a 1957 Chrysler 300C

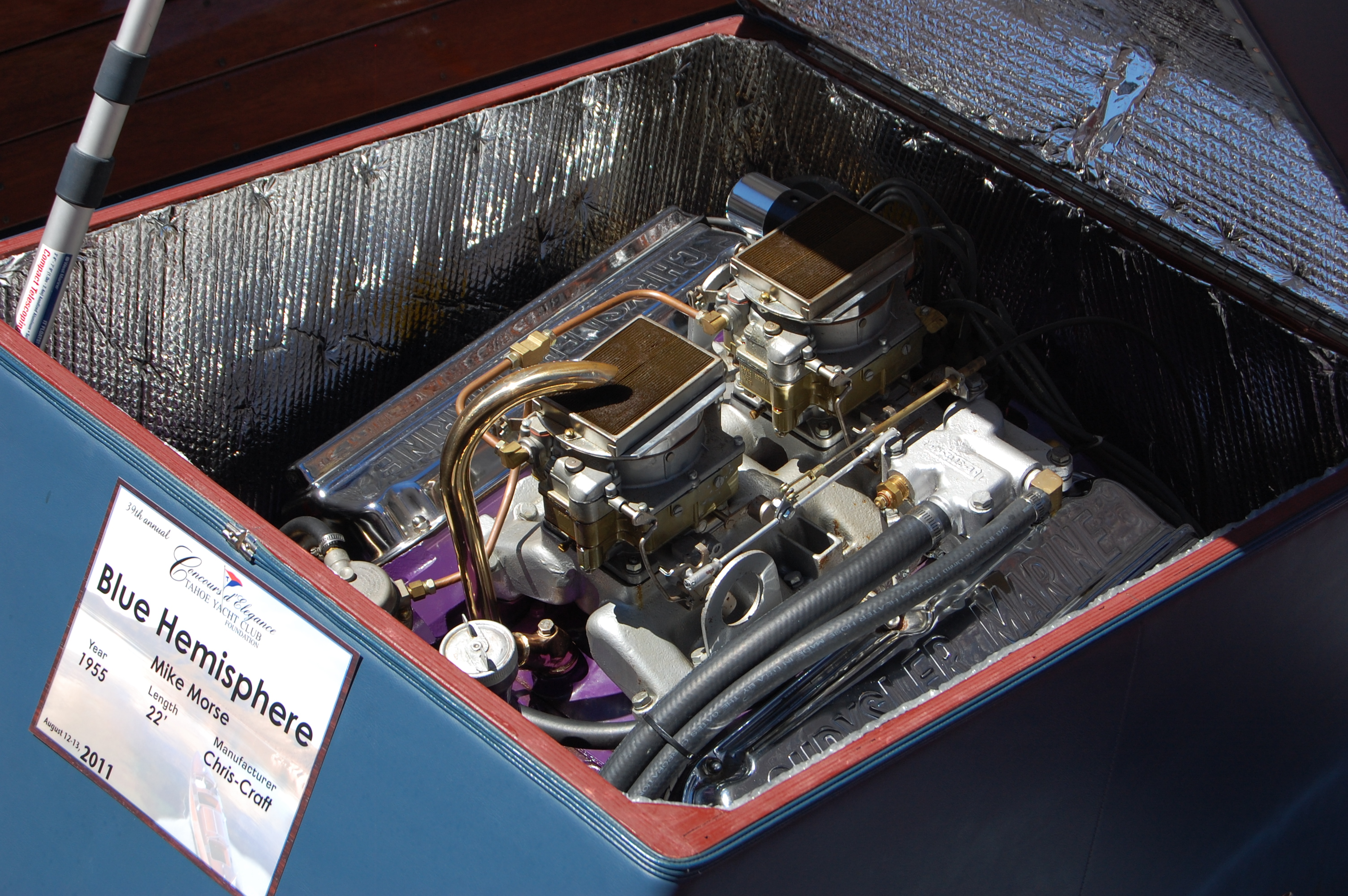
The Chrysler Marine Hemis were popular in wooden boats such as the Chris-Craft during the 1950s and 1960s

The Chrysler Hemi engine, known by the trademark Hemi or HEMI, is a series of high-performance American overhead valve V8 engines built by Chrysler with hemispherical combustion chambers. Three generations have been produced: the FirePower series (with displacements from 241 to 392 cu in (3.9 to 6.4 L) from 1951 until 1958; a 426 cu in (7.0 L) race and street engine from 1964 through 1971; and family of advanced Hemis (displacing between 5.7 and 6.4 L (348 and 391 cu in) since 2003.

Although Chrysler is most identified with "Hemi" as a marketing term, many other auto manufacturers have incorporated Hemispherical cylinder head designs.

During the 1970s and 1980s, Chrysler also applied the term Hemi to their Australian-made Hemi-6 Engine, and a 4-cylinder Mitsubishi 2.6 L engine installed in various North American market vehicles.

== Design ==
The main advantage of a hemispherical head engine over other head designs is power. On the other hand, hemi head engines tend to have complex valve trains, are expensive to build, and are larger and heavier than conventional designs.

A hemispherical combustion chamber is efficient, with an excellent surface-to-volume ratio, minimal heat loss to the cylinder head, and room for two large valves. However, it allows no more than two valves per cylinder because of their large size, and they are necessarily heavier than those in a multi-valve engine. The intake and exhaust valves lie on opposite sides of the chamber and necessitate a "cross-flow" head design. Because the combustion chamber is a partial hemisphere, a flat-topped piston would yield a low compression ratio unless a very long stroke is used. The piston crown is domed to protrude into the head at top dead center to attain the desired compression ratio. The result is a combustion chamber in the shape of the space between where the domed piston stops and the dome shape in the head receiving it.

The hemi-head design places the spark plug at or near the chamber's center to promote a strong flame front. However, if the hemi-head hemisphere is of equal diameter to the piston, there is minimal squish for proper turbulence to mix fuel and air thoroughly. Thus, hemi-heads, because of their lack of squish, are more sensitive to fuel octane rating; a given compression ratio will require a higher octane rating to avoid detonation in a hemi engine than in some conventional engine designs, such as the wedge and bathtub.

The hemi head always has intake and exhaust valve stems that point in different directions, requiring a large, wide cylinder head and complex rocker arm geometry in both cam-in-block and single overhead cam engines (dual overhead cam engines may not have rocker arms). This adds to the overall width of the engine, limiting the vehicles in which it can be installed.

Significant challenges in the commercialization of engine designs using hemispherical chambers revolved around the valve actuation, specifically how to make it effective, efficient, and reliable at an acceptable cost. This complexity was referenced early in Chrysler's development of their 1950s hemi engine: the head was referred to in company advertising as the Double Rocker Shaft head.

== First generation: FirePower 1951–1958 ==
FirePower

Overview
- Manufacturer: Chrysler
- Also called: "hemi" engine
- Production: 1951–1963

Layout
- Configuration: Naturally aspirated V8
- Displacement: 6,391 cc (390 cu in)
- Cylinder bore: 4.05 in (102.9 mm)
- Piston stroke: 3.785 in (96.1 mm)
- Cylinder block material: Cast iron
- Cylinder head material: Aluminum; Cast iron
- Valvetrain: OHV 2 valves per cylinder
- Compression ratio: initially 7.5:1 (in 1951 Chrysler)

Combustion
- Fuel system: 2X4 barrel Carter AFB Carburetor
- Fuel type: Gasoline
- Oil system: Wet sump; Dry sump
- Cooling system: Liquid-cooled

Output
- Power output: 320 hp (239 kW) (Gross); 350 bhp (261 kW) (Net)
- Specific power: 60.9 hp (45 kW) per liter
- Torque output: 490 lb⋅ft (664 N⋅m)

Dimensions
- Dry weight: 650 lb (295 kg)

Chronology
- Successor: 426 Wedge

Chrysler developed its first experimental hemi engine for the Republic P-47 Thunderbolt fighter aircraft. The XIV-2220 was an inverted overhead-valve (OHV) V16 rated at 2,500 hp (1,860 kW). The P-47 was already in production with a Pratt & Whitney radial engine when the XIV-2220 flew successfully in trials in 1945 as a possible upgrade, but the war was winding down and it did not go into production. However, the exercise gave Chrysler engineers valuable research and development experience with two-valve hemi combustion chamber dynamics and parameters.

In addition to the aircraft engine, Chrysler and Continental Motors Company worked together to develop the air-cooled AV-1790-5B V12 Hemi engine used in the M47 Patton tank.

Chrysler applied their military experience with the hemispherical combustion chamber to its first automobile engine, an OHV V8 engine released under the name FirePower, not "Hemi," in 1950 for the 1951 model year. The first version of the FirePower engine had a displacement of 331 cu in (5.4 L) and produced 180 bhp (134 kW). Eventually, three of the four Chrysler divisions had their own version of the FirePower engine, with different displacements and designations, and having almost no parts in common. This lack of commonality was due in part to the three engine versions using different bore spacings (the center-to-center distance between adjacent cylinders). Chrysler and Imperial called their versions the FirePower. DeSoto called theirs the FireDome. Dodge had a smaller version, known as the Red Ram. Only Plymouth did not have a version, but retained the Dodge poly-head engines. There was no Plymouth Hemi engine until the 1964 426.

Briggs Cunningham used the Chrysler version in some of his race cars for international motorsports. A Chrysler-powered Cunningham C-5R won its class in 1953. Cunningham switched away from these designs in 1959 when Chrysler temporarily abandoned the hemispherical concept in favor of the wedge-head B engine until 1964. Carl Kiekhaefer also used the Chrysler engines in his NASCAR cars from 1955 and 1956, winning the Grand National Series championship both years.

Collectively, the 1951–1958 Hemi engines are now commonly retroactively referred to as first-generation Hemi engines, which can be identified by the rear-mounted distributor and the spark plugs in a row down the center of wide valve covers.

=== 1951 Plymouth Hemi V6 ===
There were plans in 1951 for a Plymouth dual overhead cam Hemi V6 displacing 235 cubic inches (3.9 L) designed by Chrysler's Powerplant Research and Engine Design division. Known internally as A173, it was meant to be a powerful, fuel-efficient alternative to Ford's V8 and to replace Plymouth's venerable flathead six. However, the plans were scrapped because of high build costs and the then-unusual design.

=== Chrysler and Imperial ===
All Chrysler FirePower engines are oversquare; i.e. their bore is larger than their stroke.

==== 331 ====
This first FirePower engine, used from 1951 to 1955, has a bore of 3.8125 in (96.8 mm) and a stroke of 3.625 in (92.1 mm) for a piston displacement of 331.1 cu in (5,425 cc), with a deck height of 10.385 in (263.8 mm) ("low deck"). The bore spacing, shared by all Chrysler FirePower engines, was 4.5625 in (115.9 mm), the largest of any first generation Hemi engines. Most used a two-barrel carburetor and produced 180 bhp (134 kW), with the exception of the 1955 Chrysler C-300 equipped with dual Carter WCFB four-barrel carburetors and was rated at 300 hp (224 kW).

The 331 engine was used in the following applications:

- 1951–1955 Chrysler New Yorker
- 1951–1954 Chrysler Imperial and 1955 Imperial (Note: Imperial became a separate make and division unto itself, starting in 1955, and no longer bore the "Chrysler" name.)
- 1951 Chrysler Saratoga
- 1952 Chrysler Saratoga Club Coupe
- 1952 Chrysler Imperial Parade Phaeton
- 1954 Dodge C Series
- 1955 Chrysler C-300
- 1956 Chrysler Norseman concept car
- 1956 Facel Vega FV2B
- 1958 Hongqi CA72
- The Chrysler Air-Raid Siren. At 138 decibels, it is reputed to be the loudest siren ever made.

==== 354 ====
The 354, released in 1956, had a bore of 3.9375 (100mm) in and stroke of 3.625 (92.1mm) in, and the same 10.385" (264mm) low deck height, for a displacement of 5,787 cc (353.1 cu in). The 300B engine was rated at 340 bhp (254 kW), while the New Yorker and Imperial 354 engine configuration produced 280 bhp (209 kW). For the 300B, an optional 355 hp (265 kW; 360 PS) version was available, making it the first American V8 to be rated at one horsepower per cubic inch. (Note that before 1972, horsepower was SAE gross (equivalent to maximum output); thereafter, it was rated as SAE net (power delivered to the transmission, less accessories, emission controls, exhaust system, and other power-sinks).) The 354 was also modified. The Hemi was optimized for heavy-duty truck service. These were available with one or two four-barrel carburetors, and were offered in Dodge's heaviest-duty models as the 'Power Giant V-8' from 1957 through 1959; they were the largest of four Hemi truck engines offered by Dodge in the 1950s. The 354 was also offered in certain models with polyspheric heads rather than hemi heads. The combustion chambers on these had similarities to both hemi and wedge heads, but were closer in weight to wedge heads. Thus, both 354 poly and 354 Hemi V8 engines were variously available in 1957.

The 354 engine was used in the following applications:

- 1956 Chrysler New Yorker
- 1956 Chrysler 300B
- 1956 Imperial Custom & Crown
- 1957 Dodge D-501
- 1957–1959 Dodge C Series Pickup

==== 392 ====
The 392 raised-deck engine released in 1957 had a 4.00 in (101.6 mm) bore and 3.906 in (99.21 mm) stroke. The actual displacement is 392.67 cu in (6,435 cc). The deck height, at 10.87 in (276.1 mm), was 1/2 in (13 mm) taller than that of the previous blocks. Because its deck was taller, the heads were cast with wider intake ports so that earlier manifolds could be used with the new heads on the new taller block. For 1958, Chrysler offered the 392 in two configurations: 325 bhp (242 kW) with 9.25:1 compression and 345 bhp (257 kW) with 10:1 compression, both with a single four-barrel carburetor. A dual four-barrel version of the 392 available in the 1957–58 Chrysler 300C and 300D cars was rated at 375 bhp (280 kW); the 300D, and some marine and industrial engines, used a (now rare) adjustable rocker. An extremely rare option available on the 1958 300D was Bendix "Electrojector" fuel injection, with which the 392 was rated at 390 bhp (291 kW). Due to reliability problems with the primitive onboard computer which controlled the injection system; however, 15 of the 16 300D cars built with the fuel injection option were recalled and retrofitted with carburetors.

The 392 engine was used in the following applications:

- 1957–1958 Chrysler New Yorker
- 1957–1958 Imperial Custom, Crown, and LeBaron
- 1957 Chrysler 300C
- 1958 Chrysler 300D
- 1958 Facel Vega Excellence (EX)

In the late 1950s and early 1960s, drag racers found the 392 to be a formidable engine and continued to run them competitively into the 1970s. Usual color of the block was silver.

=== DeSoto ===
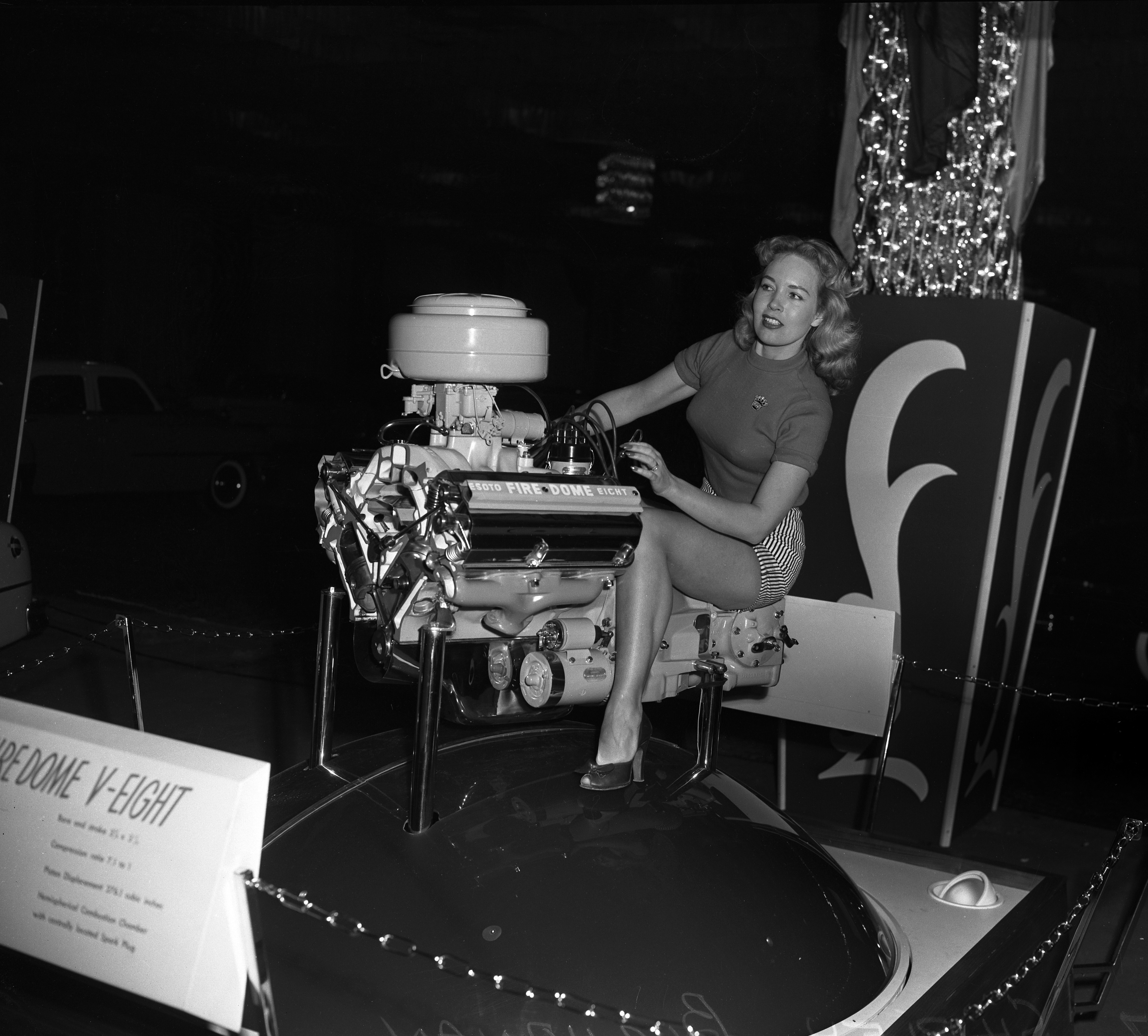
New DeSoto Fire Dome engine at 1952 Los Angeles International Automobile Show.

DeSoto's Hemi engines were called FireDome and served as the naming convention for the DeSoto Firedome sedan.

==== 276 ====
In 1952, DeSoto introduced its version of the FirePower (FireDome), with a bore of 3.625 in (92.08 mm) and stroke of 3.344 in (84.94 mm), for a displacement of 276.1 cu in (4.5 L). The bore spacing, shared by all DeSoto FirePower engines, was 4.3125 in (109.54 mm). Power output was 160 bhp (119 kW). It was a hot seller, with 50,000 vehicles using the engine until it was replaced in 1954.

==== 291 ====
In 1955, DeSoto increased the displacement of the FirePower (FireDome), by increasing the bore to 3.72 in (94.49 mm) for a displacement of 291 cu in (4.8 L). Power output was 185 bhp (138 kW) with a 2-barrel carburetor for the Firedome models and 200 bhp (149 kW) with a 4-barrel carburetor for the Fireflite models.

==== 330 ====
For 1956, the displacement for the Firedome and Fireflite models was increased again to 330 cu in (5.4 L) by increasing the stroke to 3.80 in (96.52 mm). Power output was 230 bhp (172 kW) with a 2-barrel carburetor for the Firedome models and 255 bhp (190 kW) with a 4-barrel carburetor for the Fireflite models.

==== 341 ====
Displacement was increased again for the 1956 (DeSoto Adventurer only) and 1957 (Firedome and Fireflite models) to 341.1 cu in (5.6 L). Bore was increased to 3.78 in (96.0 mm), but stroke remained at 3.80 in (96.5 mm). The DeSoto Adventurer had a compression ratio of 9.5:1, using a special camshaft profile for hydraulic lifters, and produced 320 bhp (239 kW) using dual Carter WCFB four-barrel carburetors.

The 1956 Adventurer was the premiere named high-performance version—the DeSoto equivalent of the twin four-barrel Chrysler 300.

==== 345 ====
The largest DeSoto engine for 1957 was the DeSoto Adventurer offering 344.6 cu in (5.6 L) with square bore and stroke dimensions of 3.80 inches. The DeSoto Adventurer used dual Carter WCFB four-barrel carburetors for a rating of 345 bhp (257 kW), producing one horsepower per cubic inch (the first American car to do so as standard equipment) using a similar intake manifold to the 1956 341 Adventurer and a similar camshaft. The compression ratio remained at 9.5:1.

=== Dodge ===
Dodge's Hemi was introduced in 1953 as the Red Ram. Dodge did not have a V8 engine until one was developed specifically for the line in 1953 based on the 1951 Chrysler hemi design, but downsized for these smaller cars. They have the smallest bore center spacing of any hemi engine at 4.1875 in (106.4 mm). They do not share any major dimensions or components with the larger Chrysler and DeSoto hemi engines, or the Plymouth A engines. From 1955 to 1958 (see 1956 D500 Dodge D-500 cars and packages: early performance cars) lower-performance Hemi-based alternatives to the Dodge hemi were introduced by substituting less complex poly (single rocker shaft) heads and valve train parts, including one variant only built as a poly (259"). These were used in low-line 1955-58 DeSotos and Dodges, and 1955-56 high-line Plymouths.

Dodge Trucks marketed their version of the Hemi under the name PowerDome.

==== 241 ====
Dodge introduced the 241.3 cu in (4.0 L) engine in 1953. Bore was 3.4375 in (87.3 mm) and stroke was 3.25 in (82.6 mm). With a low compression ratio of 7.0:1 (in 1953 and for the 1954 Meadowbrook), the 241 produced 140 bhp (104 kW). For 1954, the more senior Dodges received a higher 7.5:1 compression ratio 150 bhp (112 kW) version. This engine is not the same as the Plymouth 241, which had polyspheric heads. The 241 Dodge Hemi only lasted two years, being replaced by the 270 for 1955.

==== 270 ====
The D553 1955/1956 Dodge Red Ram Hemi 270 displaced 270 cu in (4.4 L) and was used in premium 1955 and 1956 Dodge vehicles. Bore was 3.625 in (92.1 mm) and stroke was 3.25 in (82.6 mm). It was not the same as the 270 poly-head. In the Dodge Coronet, the 270 produced 183 bhp (136 kW) at a compression ratio of 7.6:1. In higher trims like the Dodge Royal, the "Super Red Ram" featured a four-barrel carburetor and produced 193 bhp (144 kW) at the same compression ratio.

==== 315 ====
For 1956, Dodge increased the displacement to 315 cu in (5.2 L) with a longer 3.80 in (96.5 mm) stroke and a taller raised-deck block, but used polyspheric rather than hemi heads on the base version. The optional high-performance D-500 version had a four-barrel carburetor and a larger-valved Dodge hemispherical combustion chambered head.

Also, a "race only" package called the D-500-1 or DASH 1 was available with a special aluminum dual four-barrel intake that sported a pair of Carter WCFB carburetors similar to the ones on the Chrysler 300B and DeSoto Adventurer. This engine used the same cylinder heads as the base D-500 model.

In 1957 the D-501 was the Chrysler 354 engine, not a Dodge-based engine.

==== 325 ====
Dodge released the 325 cu in (5.3 L) "Super Red Ram" engine for 1957. It used a 3 11/16 in (93.7 mm; 3.69 in) bore and 3.80 in (96.5 mm) stroke, and a polyspheric chambered head (referenced as 'KDS') in its base version. A higher performance 325 was offered with hemi heads as the 'KD-500'. The 'KD-500-1' came with dual four-barrel carburetors. Even though the hemi headed offerings sported "dimples" in the valve covers for mechanical adjuster clearance, all engines had hydraulic lifters.

== Second generation: 426 1964–1971 ==
426 Hemi
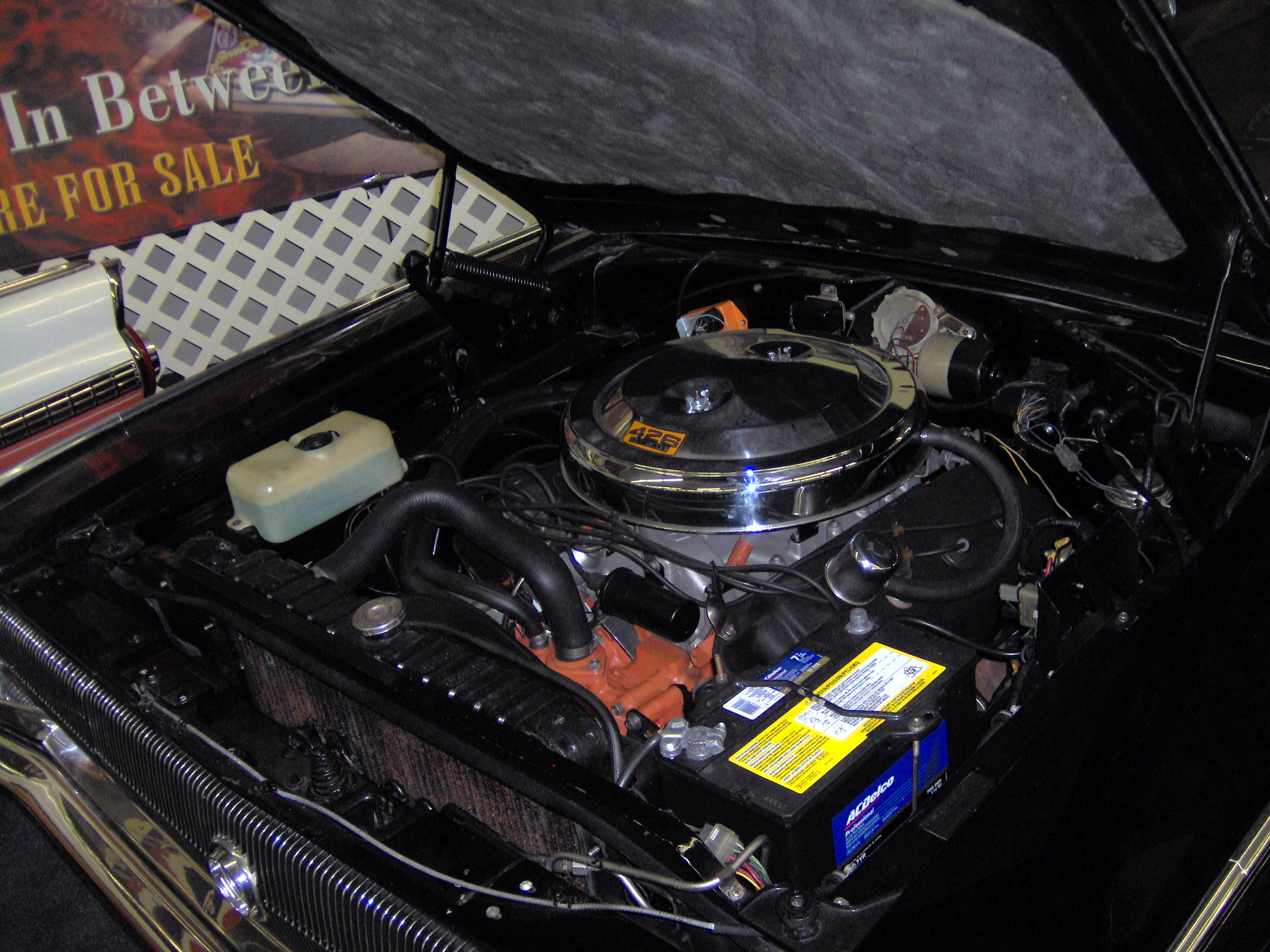
- 426 Hemi with dual Carter AFB Carburetors

Overview
- Manufacturer: Chrysler
- Also called: Elephant engine
- Production: 1964–1971

Layout
- Configuration: Naturally aspirated V8
- Displacement: 6,981 cc (426 cu in)
- Cylinder bore: 4 1/4 in (108.0 mm)
- Piston stroke: 3 3/4 in (95.3 mm)
- Cylinder block material: Cast iron
- Cylinder head material: Aluminum; Cast iron
- Valvetrain: OHV 2 valves per cylinder
- Compression ratio: 10.25:1

Combustion
- Fuel system: 2X4 barrel Carter AFB Carburetor
- Fuel type: Gasoline
- Oil system: Wet sump; Dry sump
- Cooling system: Liquid-cooled

Output
- Power output: 425 hp (317 kW) (Gross); 350 bhp (261 kW) (Net)
- Specific power: 60.9 hp (45 kW) per liter
- Torque output: 490 lb⋅ft (664 N⋅m)

Dimensions
- Dry weight: 843 lb (382 kg)

Chronology
- Predecessor: 426 Wedge

=== Chrysler’s development program, 1962–66 ===
In a 1967 professional journal, Chrysler laid out in full detail the chronology and particulars of the new hemi engine’s development:

"In December 1962 a request was made of engineering staff to develop an engine and vehicle combination capable of winning stock car competitive closed circuit track events throughout the country. It was further requested that a version of the engine suitable for use in supervised timed vehicle acceleration drag events also be made part of the engine portion of this program. Both of these applications were to share the same basic design and development; thus a decision on the basic engine itself was one that required careful consideration. However, the decision for Chrysler was obvious. The hemi engine had been a production engine from 1950 until it was discontinued in 1958. The background of development that preceded the production version of the engine was available, as was experience in converting the engine for competition use. Chrysler hemi engines had been used previously in track events, and were still in use in many drag events….The design of the new hemi engine began in January 1963 with the Feb. 23, 1964 Daytona Beach, Fla. race set as the first target date. A number of engine design avenues were initially explored in order to gain as many performance and durability features as possible while still retaining much of the existing [production] cylinder block tooling as practical. The final design selected was deemed to have the potential necessary to win and the program was launched. The engine requirements were to include a single 4 barrel carbuetor 426 cu in. track engine, and single barrel carburetor 396 cu in. track engine and a two 4 barrel carburetor 426 cu in. drag engine. Immediately following the initial introduction of the engine, a production run of several hundred drag engines and cars were planned to be built. This would serve to give widespread usage of the hemi on drag strips throughout the country and also serve as production backup to the track engine."

The article continued: "Experimental procurement of the 426 cu in. hemi engine was started in July 1963 and was completed by the end of November. The first engine ran under its own power on Dec. 6 1963. This engine was built as a track engine; the drag engine version was built later the same month. The 396 cu in. track engine had subsequently been removed from the rules and the engine was never built. This 426 cu in. track engine was used extensively throughout the 1964 season. The production of several hundred drag engines was completed by the end of the 1964 model year. Another production run of several hundred drag engines was made for the 1965 model year automobiles, with a considerable weight decrease for the engines obtained by the usage was restricted due to a change in eligibility rules which limited the scheduled race events in which the hemi engine was allowed to compete. A detuned high volume street version of the 426 hemi was designed, developed, released, and tooled as part of the 1966 model offering…With this release, full eligibility of the engine for 1966 track use was again established. A 404 cu in. version for use on certain tracks was also prepared for the 1966 season in complicance with the revised racing rules."

=== Specifications ===
The 1960s 426 was the first engine called "Hemi" by Chrysler, (Note: A designation trademarked by Chrysler. This engine is not to be confused with the Chrysler 426 Wedge, sometimes retroactively referred to as the "Gen 2" or "2G" Hemi,) the 426 was nicknamed the "elephant engine" at the time, a reference to its high power, heavy weight, and large physical dimensions. Its 10.72 in (272.3 mm) deck height and 4.80 in (121.9 mm) bore spacing made it the biggest engine in racing at the time.

The 426 Hemi "Track" version, produced for use in NASCAR, was raced in a Plymouth Belvedere in 1964 by drivers such as Richard Petty. It was not initially available to the general public. Complaints by Ford regarding its power led to the "Race Hemi" being banned from NASCAR's 1965 season due to its unavailability in production vehicles. However, several special homologated production versions of the Dodge Dart, the Plymouth Fury, and later, in 1965, the Dodge Coronet, were produced with aluminum fenders and bumpers for drag racing and made available to the general public.

Chrysler introduced the "Street Hemi" in 1966 for its intermediate range of cars and sold the required number of Hemi engines to the public to homologate its use for stock car racing in NASCAR events in 1966. The detuned “Street” engine differed from the “Track” and “Drag” versions in many ways: lowered compression (from 12.5 to 10.25), bearing cap material (cast iron rather than malleable iron), a different finish on the crankshaft journals, piston weights, piston clearance, piston pin size, valve springs and intake manifold design. The “Street” engine featured a heated intake manifold, cast iron exhaust manifolds, automatic choke, and a milder cam.

The "Street Hemi" version was rated at 425 bhp (431 PS; 317 kW) at 5000 rpm SAE gross and 490 lb⋅ft (664 N⋅m) at 4000 rpm of torque. In actual dynamometer testing, it produced 433.5 hp (323 kW; 440 PS) and 472 lb⋅ft (640 N⋅m) of torque in purely stock form. Chrysler's sales literature published both the gross 425 hp (317 kW; 431 PS) and net 350 hp (261 kW; 355 PS) ratings for 1971.

The “Track” and “Drag” engines were more alike than the “Street” engine was with either. Among differening specifications in these racing engines for 1964-66 were: piston weights, intake valve diameter, water pumps, carburetion, camshaft profiles, and construction material (more aluminum and magnesium in "Drag" engine).

There were many differences between the Hemi and the 426 Wedge, including the Hemi having cross-bolted steel main bearing caps and a different head bolt pattern. Although all manufacturers were familiar with multi-valve engines and hemispherical combustion chambers, adding more valves per cylinder and designing the complex valvetrain they require were expensive ways of improving the high–revolutions per minute (rpm) breathing of production vehicles. By canting the angle of the NASCAR-mandated two valves per cylinder, significantly larger valves could be used. Both the Chrysler 426 Hemi and all Chrysler RB engines were oversquare, with the 426 Hemi and 426 Wedge sharing a 4 1/4 in × 3 3/4 in (108.0 mm × 95.3 mm) bore and stroke. Blocks for the 426 Hemi were stress relieved at the factory, to prevent cracking under high RPM loads.

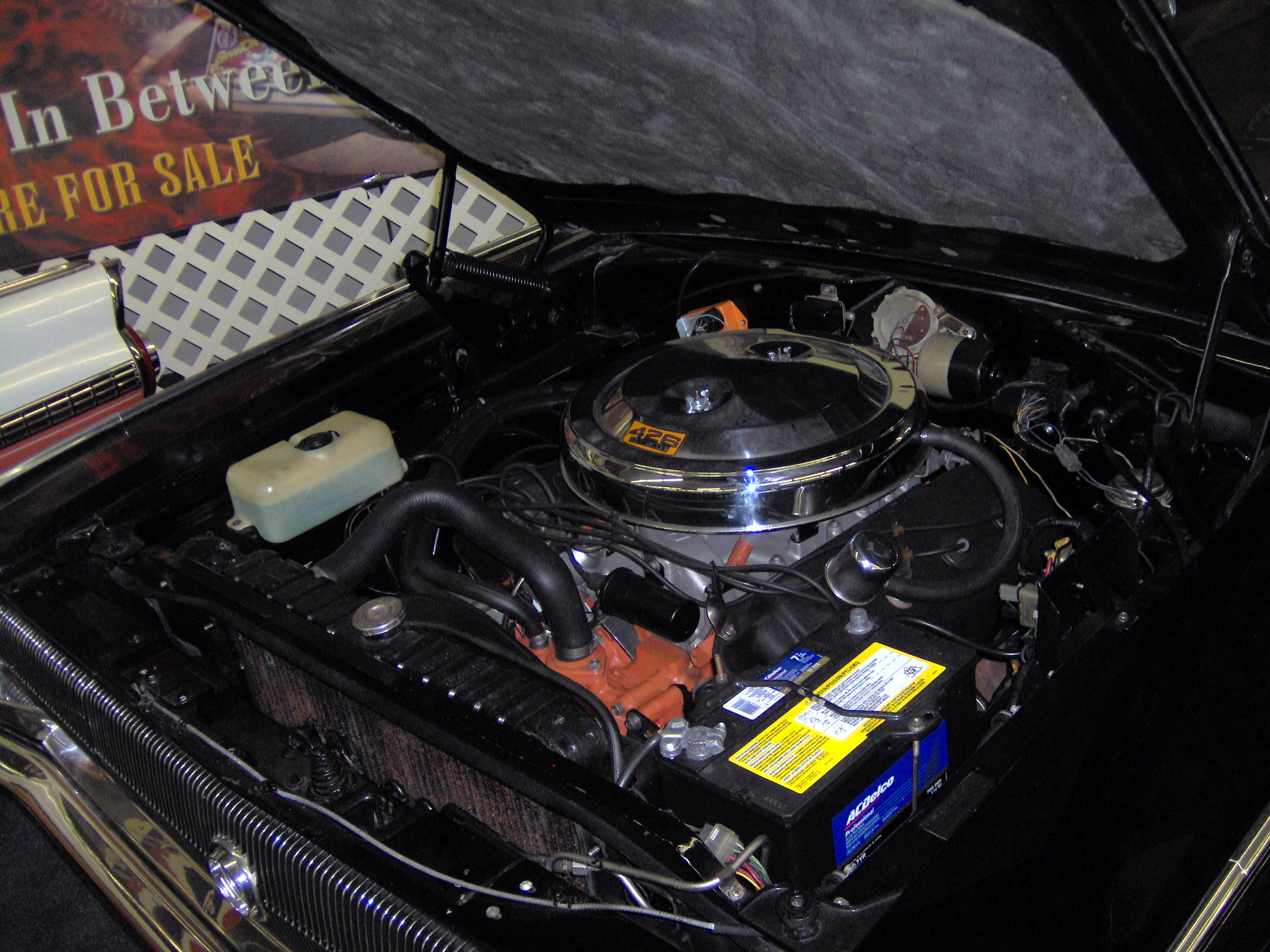
426 Hemi engine in a 1966 Charger

The "Street" version of the second generation Hemi engine was used (optionally, in all but the last case) in the following vehicles:

- 1966–1970 Dodge Coronet/Plymouth Belvedere
- 1966–1971 Plymouth Satellite
- 1966–1971 Dodge Charger
- 1966–1971 Jensen FF
- 1966–1971 Jensen Interceptor
- 1967–1971 Plymouth GTX
- 1968 Dodge Dart Super Stock
- 1968 Plymouth Barracuda
- 1968–1971 Dodge Super Bee
- 1968–1971 Plymouth Road Runner
- 1969 Dodge Charger R/T
- 1969 Dodge Charger Daytona
- 1970 Plymouth Superbird
- 1970–1971 Plymouth Hemi 'Cuda
- 1970–1971 Dodge Challenger
- 1970 Monteverdi Hai 450

=== In racing ===
There were many differences between the racing Hemis and the street version, including but not limited to compression ratio, camshaft, intake manifold, exhaust manifold. Some 1960s NASCAR and NHRA Hemi engines featured magnesium cross-ram intake manifolds and magnesium oil pans in an attempt to reduce the massive weight of the overall engine, along with chain-driven internal dry sump oil systems. Today, aftermarket blocks, heads, intakes, rods, and pistons are usually made of aluminum.

== Third generation: 2003–present ==
Third generation
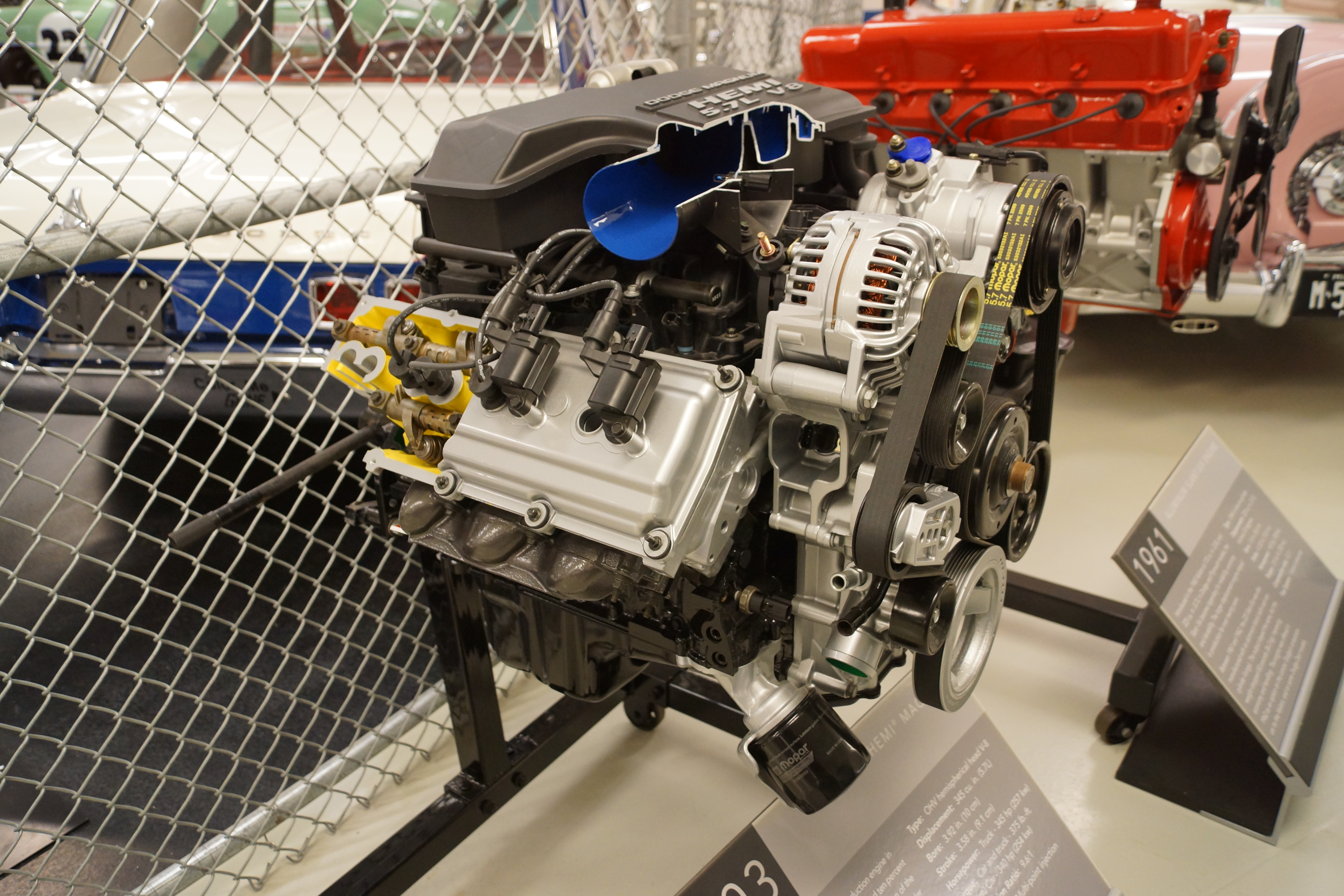
- 2003 5.7 HEMI, the first year of the third generation HEMIs

Overview
- Manufacturer: Chrysler
- Production: 2003–present

Layout
- Configuration: 90° V8
- Displacement: 5,654 cc (345 cu in); 6,058 cc (369.7 cu in); 6,166 cc (376.3 cu in); 6,415 cc (391 cu in)
- Cylinder bore: 99.49 mm (3.917 in); 103.00 mm (4.055 in); 103.89 mm (4.090 in)
- Piston stroke: 90.88 mm (3.578 in); 94.59 mm (3.724 in)
- Cylinder block material: Cast iron
- Cylinder head material: Aluminum
- Valvetrain: OHV 2 valves per cylinder (16 total)
- Compression ratio: 9.5:1; 9.6:1; 10.3:1; 10.9:1

Combustion
- Fuel system: Sequential multiport fuel injection
- Fuel type: Gasoline
- Oil system: Wet sump
- Cooling system: Water-cooled

Chronology
- Predecessor: Chrysler LA engine; Chrysler PowerTech engine; Chrysler B engine

The current-production "HEMI" engine was launched in 2003. The cylinder heads are flatter and more complex than the 1950s–'70s Hemi V8 chamber. The combustion chambers are no longer truly hemispherical.

It uses a coil-on-plug (distributor-less) ignition system and two spark plugs per cylinder to shorten flame travel leading to more consistent combustion and reduced emissions. A new variable displacement technology called Multi-Displacement System (MDS) is used in some versions which can shut off two cylinders on each bank under light load to improve fuel economy.

Like most of Chrysler's past-model Hemi-head engines, the 5.7 L version is rated at approximately one horsepower per cubic inch (the current engines are SAE net, whereas the old Hemi engines were rated SAE gross). For the 2009 model year power was increased to 357-395 horsepower (266-291 kW) and 389-410 lb·ft (527-556 N·m) depending on application. It also achieved 4% better fuel economy. Variable valve timing (VVT) was also introduced.

=== 5.7 ===
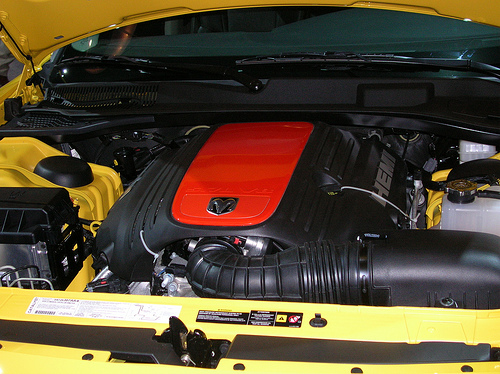
5.7 Hemi engine

The 5.7 L HEMI was released for model year 2003 on the Dodge Ram pickup trucks to supplant the Magnum 5.9 engine. From 2004 to 2013, it was the only available gasoline engine in the Ram Heavy Duty. Chrysler later made the 5.7 L Hemi available in all models of the 2004 Dodge Ram, Dodge Durango, the 2005 Chrysler 300C, Dodge Magnum R/T, Jeep Grand Cherokee, the 2006 Dodge Charger R/T, Jeep Commander, the 2007 Chrysler Aspen, the 2009 Dodge Challenger R/T, and the 2022 Jeep Wagoneer. For manual transmission applications (Challenger and 3/4- and 1-ton Ram pickups), cylinder deactivation is not included.

The 5.7 L (345 cu in) Hemi in the Ram delivered 345 hp (257 kW) and 375 lb⋅ft (508 N⋅m), but 340 hp (254 kW) and 390 lb⋅ft (529 N⋅m) for the 300C and Magnum R/T, which is exactly 100 hp (75 kW) more than the old 5.9 engine. It is a 90-degree V8, 2-valve pushrod design like the past Magnum series engines, displacing 5,654 cc (345 cu in), with a bore of 3.917 in (99.49 mm) and a stroke of 3.578 in (90.88 mm).

The 5.7 L Hemi is made at Chrysler's Saltillo Engine plant in Ramos Arizpe, Mexico.

The Hemi was on the Ward's 10 Best Engines list for 2003 through 2007, and again in 2009.

This engine has been used in the following vehicles:

- 2003–present Ram 1500
- 2004–present Dodge Durango
- 2005–2008 Dodge Magnum R/T
- 2005–2021 Chrysler 300C
- 2010, 2012–2023 Chrysler 300S V8
- 2005–2023 Jeep Grand Cherokee
- 2006–2023 Dodge Charger R/T
- 2006–2010 Jeep Commander
- 2007–2009 Chrysler Aspen
- 2009–2023 Dodge Challenger R/T
- 2022–2023 Jeep Wagoneer

==== 2009 VCT Revision ====
Chrysler made various revisions to the 5.7 L for the 2009 model year. The first for all applications was what Chrysler called Variable Camshaft Timing or VCT. VCT (which is essentially variable valve timing) uses an oil control valve that controls oil flow to a unique camshaft sprocket that contains a phasing device, which depending on the operation of the oil control valve, either advances or retards camshaft timing.

Cylinder heads were revised to increase flow. Though the intake manifold was also changed on all applications, it was still model-specific. The Dodge Ram, non-Hybrid Electric Vehicle (HEV) Chrysler Aspens, and non-HEV Dodge Durango utilized an active intake manifold with a short runner valve to optimize torque and horsepower. At lower engine speeds, the valve was closed, resulting in improved low-end torque from the longer runners. At higher engine speeds, the valve was opened, diverting the incoming air into the center of the manifold. The shorter runners resulted in improved horsepower. Passenger cars, Jeep vehicles, as well as HEV Chrysler Aspen and HEV Dodge Durango did not use this manifold; instead, these vehicles utilized a passive intake manifold, which did not have a short runner valve. Also, the new cylinder head came with different spark plug seats: tapered seats were replaced with gasket seats. This change made it impossible to use the old OE Champion RE14MCC4, so the new spark plugs that came with 5.7 HEMI became NGK LZFR5C-11. Besides different seats, the spark plug gap grew from .039" (1.0 mm) to .043" (1.1 mm).

Engines mated to the six-speed manual transmission or used in the Ram Heavy Duty did not feature the Multi-Displacement System (MDS). The new version of the 5.7 L had five different camshaft profiles, all with VCT:

- Active intake without MDS
- Active intake with MDS
- Passive intake without MDS
- Passive intake with MDS
- HEV application (modified version of passive intake with MDS)

Power numbers:

- 300C/300S V8: 363 hp (271 kW), 394 lb⋅ft (534 N⋅m)
- Charger R/T: 370 hp (276 kW), 395 lb⋅ft (536 N⋅m)
- Challenger R/T automatic: 372 hp (277 kW), 400 lb⋅ft (542 N⋅m)
- Challenger R/T 6-speed manual: 375 hp (280 kW), 410 lb⋅ft (556 N⋅m)
- 2009–2012 Ram 1500 truck: 390 hp (291 kW), 407 lb⋅ft (552 N⋅m)
- 2013+ Ram 1500 truck: 395 hp (295 kW), 410 lb⋅ft (556 N⋅m)
- Ram 2500/3500 truck: 383 hp (286 kW), 400 lb⋅ft (542 N⋅m)
- Jeep Grand Cherokee and Jeep Commander: 360 hp (268 kW), 390 lb⋅ft (529 N⋅m)
- 2011+ Dodge Durango: 360 hp (268 kW), 390 lb⋅ft (529 N⋅m)
- 2009 Chrysler Aspen and Dodge Durango non-HEV: 376 hp (280 kW), 401 lb⋅ft (544 N⋅m)
- 2009 Chrysler Aspen and Dodge Durango HEV: 399 hp (298 kW), 390 lb⋅ft (529 N⋅m)
- 2022 Jeep Wagoneer: 392 hp (292 kW), 404 lb⋅ft (548 N⋅m)

=== 6.1 ===
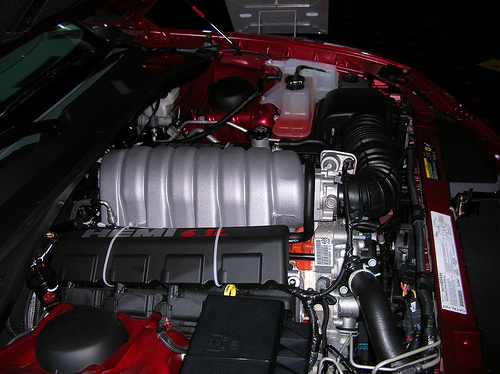
6.1 Hemi engine

The Hemi was also available in a 6,059 cc (6.1 L; 369.7 cu in) version that was developed in 2004 for the 2005 model year Chrysler 300C SRT8. The engine's bore × stroke was 103 mm × 90.9 mm (4.055 in × 3.579 in), and many other changes were made to allow it to produce 425 bhp (317 kW; 431 PS) at 6,200 rpm and 420 lb⋅ft (569 N⋅m) of torque at 4,800 rpm. The engine block differed from the 5.7, with revised coolant channels and oil jets to cool the pistons. A forged crankshaft, lighter pistons, and strengthened connecting rods improved durability. A cast aluminium intake manifold was tuned for high-rpm power and did not include variable-length technology. Chrysler's Multi-Displacement System was not used on the 6.1.

Applications:

- 2005–2010 Chrysler 300C SRT8
- 2006–2008 Dodge Magnum SRT8
- 2006–2010 Dodge Charger SRT8
- 2006–2010 Jeep Grand Cherokee SRT8
- 2008–2010 Dodge Challenger SRT8

=== 6.2 Supercharged ===
==== SRT Hellcat ====
For 2015, Chrysler introduced an all-new high performance supercharged variant of the Hemi engine, called the Hellcat (named after the Grumman F6F Hellcat). It features the same 4.09 in (103.9 mm) bore as the 6.4 L Hemi and the same 3.578 in (90.9 mm) stroke as the 5.7 L, giving it a total displacement of 6,166 cc (6.2 L; 376.3 cu in). The supercharger is a 2,380 cc (145 cu in) twin-screw IHI unit with integrated charge coolers, capable of producing 11.6 psi (80 kPa; 0.80 bar) of boost. This engine is rated at 707 hp (717 PS; 527 kW) at 6,000 rpm and 650 lb⋅ft (881 N⋅m) at 4,000 rpm of torque and has a compression ratio of 9.5:1. This engine was the most powerful engine produced by Chrysler as well as the most powerful production engine ever in a muscle car until the Dodge Demon was introduced. This engine is not equipped with Chrysler's Multi-Displacement System. In 2017, Mopar announced that it would sell it as a crate engine under the name Hellcrate. A Redeye version with 797 hp (808 PS; 594 kW) debuted in the Dodge Challenger in 2019, followed by the Dodge Charger in 2021. The 2026 and onward version of the engine found in the TRX and Rumble Bee versions of the Ram 1500 use newer equipment and produce 777 hp (788 PS; 579 kW) and 680 lb⋅ft (922 N⋅m).

Applications:

- 2015–2023 Dodge Challenger SRT Hellcat/Hellcat Redeye
- 2015–2023 Dodge Charger SRT Hellcat/Hellcat Redeye
- 2018–2021 Jeep Grand Cherokee Trackhawk
- 2021, 2023–present Dodge Durango SRT Hellcat
- 2021–2024, 2027–present Ram 1500 TRX
- 2027-present Ram 1500 Rumble Bee

==== SRT Demon ====
The Demon version of the Hemi V8 features a number of improvements over the Hellcat variant. It is fitted with a larger, 2.7 L twin-screw supercharger, as well as reinforced reciprocating components, a new camshaft, and several other valvetrain upgrades. With these improvements, the Challenger SRT Demon is rated at 808 hp (603 kW) on 91-octane pump gasoline, and 840 horsepower when running on 100-octane unleaded racing gasoline. Cooling is aided by a functional Air-Grabber hood scoop, as well as a unique charge cooling system that makes use of the air-conditioning coolant to lower the intake charge air temperature.

Applications:

- 2018 Dodge Challenger SRT Demon

=== 6.4 ===
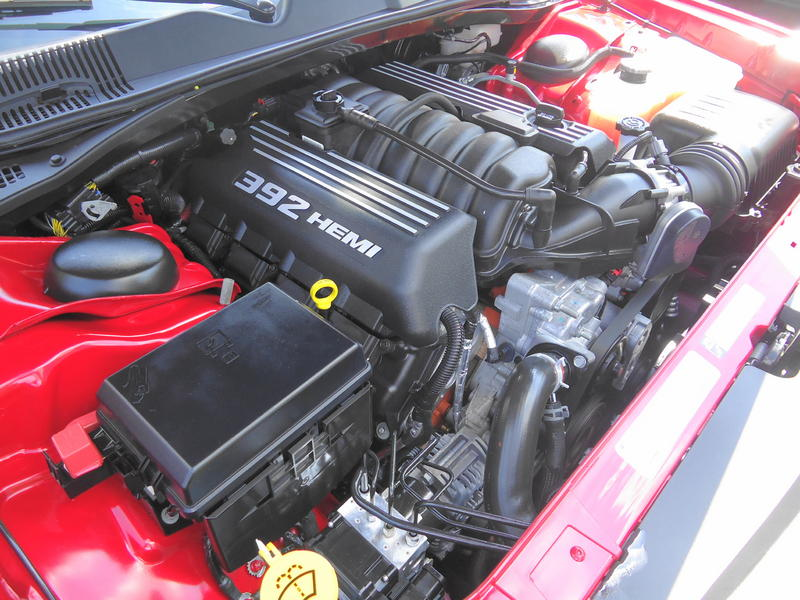
392 CID V8 HEMI Engine

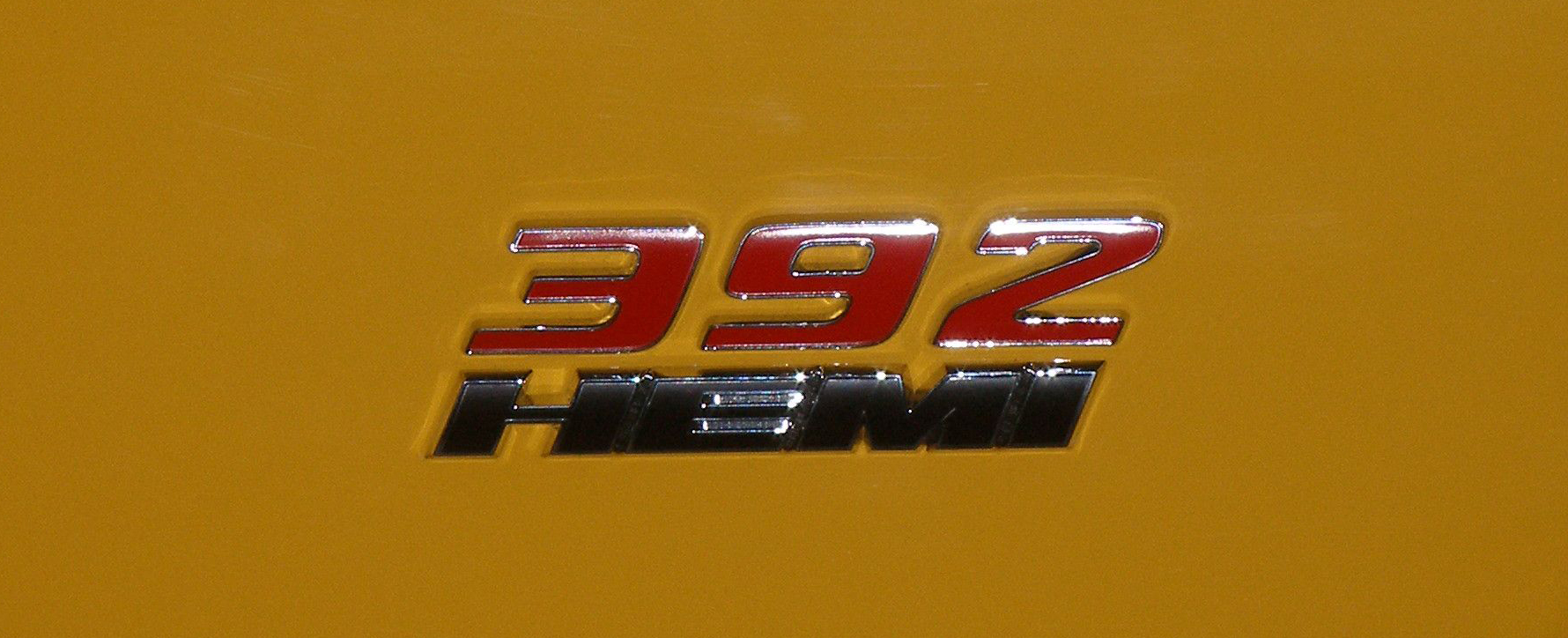
392 HEMI badge

Chrysler displayed a larger and more powerful 392-cubic-inch (6.4 L) HEMI in 2005 with a factory-rated output of 525 hp (391 kW; 532 PS) and 510 lb⋅ft (691 N⋅m) torque. It is equipped with high-strength forged aluminum alloy pistons. This engine has been available since 2007, as a crate engine under the name 392 HEMI.

The production version of the 392 HEMI was developed in 2010, launched in the 2011 model year Dodge Challenger SRT8 with variable camshaft timing as well as MDS in cars with automatic transmissions. The new 392 HEMI, codenamed "Apache," is based on the third-generation 5.7 L HEMI, codenamed "Eagle," and shares few parts with the 392 crate engine. The "Apache" 6.4L features forged steel crankshaft, hypereutectic cast aluminum pistons with floating pins, 10.9:1 compression ratio, 2.14in intake valves and 1.65in exhaust valves.

Special-edition Chargers and Challengers equipped with this engine, and the engines themselves, featured "392 HEMI" badging in commemorative reference to the first-generation engine of the same displacement. In other applications, the engine is badged as "6.4L HEMI." Output is 470 hp (350 kW) and 470 lb⋅ft (637 N⋅m);

For the 2015 model year, horsepower was increased to 485 hp (362 kW) and torque to 475 lb⋅ft (644 N⋅m) in the Charger and Challenger SRT 392 (2015–2018) and R/T Scat Pack (2015–2023) models; the Grand Cherokee SRT only saw a 5 bhp increase. Export models of the Chrysler 300 SRT retained the 470 hp (350 kW) and 470 lb⋅ft (637 N⋅m) output.

Applications:

- 2023 Chrysler 300C
- 2012–2014 Chrysler 300 SRT8
- 2015–2021 Chrysler 300 SRT (Overseas)
- 2011–2023 Dodge Challenger SRT8/SRT 392/Scat Pack
- 2012–2023 Dodge Charger SRT8/SRT 392/Scat Pack
- 2018–2024 Dodge Durango SRT
- 2012–2021 Jeep Grand Cherokee SRT8/SRT
- 2022–2023 Jeep Grand Wagoneer
- 2021–2025 Jeep Wrangler Unlimited Rubicon 392
- 2025—present Jeep Wrangler Moab 392
- 2026—present Jeep Wrangler Willys 392
- 2026 Dodge Durango R/T
- 2027-present Ram 1500 Rumble Bee

==== Ram Heavy Duty truck and chassis-cab version ====
Starting in model year 2014, the Ram 2500 and 3500 trucks, and Ram 3500, 4500, and 5500 chassis-cabs offered a revised version of the 6.4 L known as the "BGE", Big Gas Engine. Compared to the 6.4L in passenger cars/SUVs, the truck version is tuned for durability and a power band more suitable for hauling and towing, and compatibility with lower octane fuel.

The BGE 6.4L features a grey cast iron block shared with the 6.2L Hellcat engine, which features reinforced bulkheads and ribs. The aluminum heads of the BGE 6.4L are also shared with the Hellcat 6.2, manufactured with additional ribs and cast from 356-T6 aluminum. The BGE 6.4L features dished pistons to achieve a lower compression ratio of 10.0:1, vs the 10.9:1 compression ratio of the SRT variant.

The engine rpm is limited to 5800 rpm in pickup truck models, and 4660 rpm when paired to the Aisin transmission.

In 2016, it replaced the 5.7 L as the standard gasoline engine in the chassis-cab models, and for 2019 became the standard gasoline engine in 2500 and 3500 models.

Power numbers:

- Ram 2500/3500 pickup and 3500 SRW chassis-cab with RFE or ZF 8HP transmission: 410 hp (306 kW), 429 lb⋅ft (582 N⋅m)
- Ram 3500 Mega Cab and 3500 DRW chassis-cab with RFE or ZF 8HP transmission, 3500 SRW/DRW with Aisin transmission: 370 hp (276 kW), 429 lb⋅ft (582 N⋅m)
- Ram 4500 and 5500 chassis-cab: 366 hp (273 kW), 429 lb⋅ft (582 N⋅m)

=== Mopar 426 HEMI (2012–2014) ===
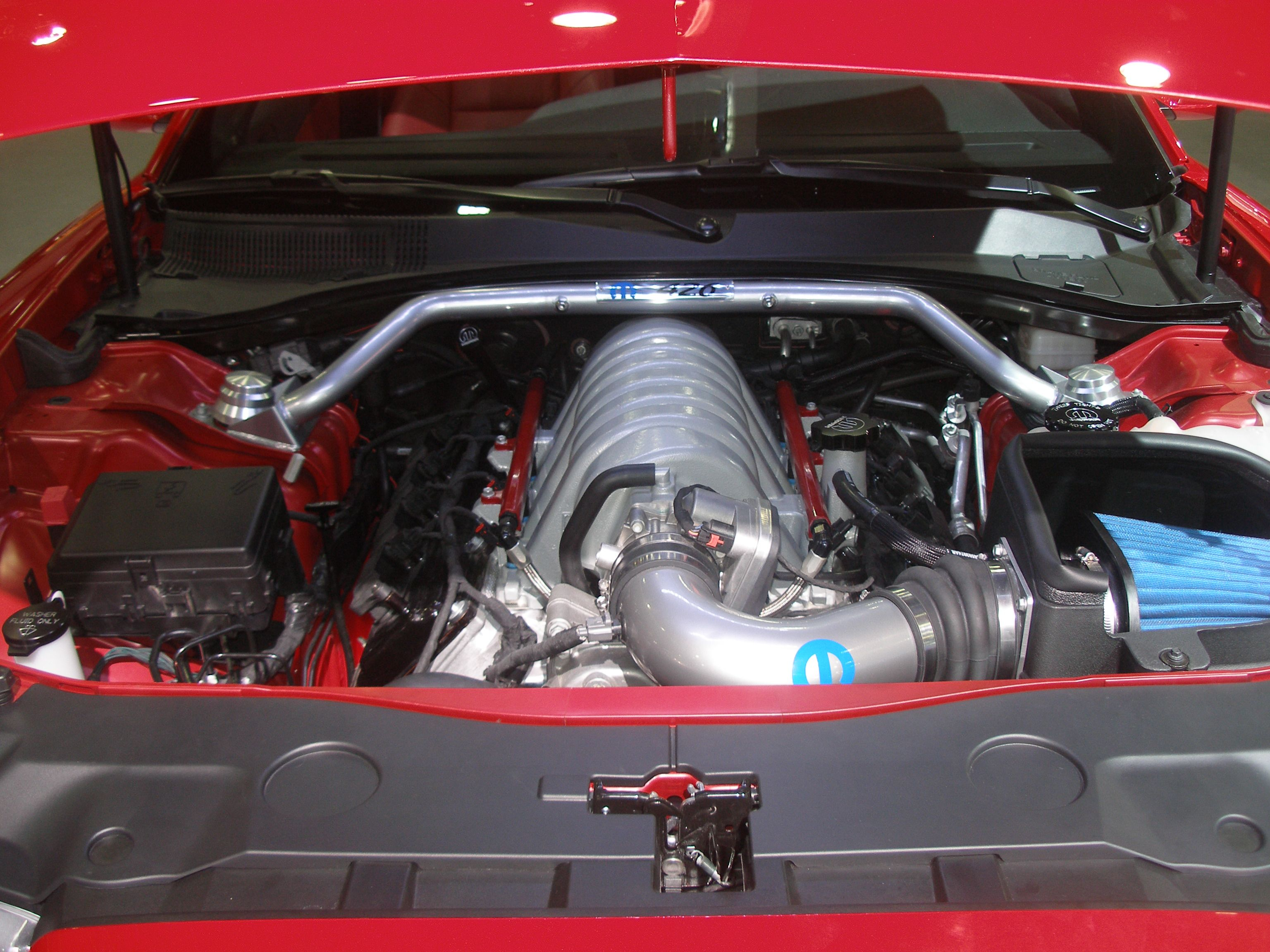
The 426 HEMI in a Dodge Charger Redline

At the 2012 North American International Auto Show in Detroit, Dodge debuted a Mopar Customized Dodge Charger "Redline" that featured a modern 426-cubic-inch (7.0 L) HEMI V8 engine rated at 590 hp (440 kW; 598 PS).

=== Mopar 426 HEMI "Hellephant" (2018–present) ===
The Hellephant name is a spin on the nickname of the original 426-cubic-inch (7.0 L) HEMI, Elephant, and the modern Supercharged 6.2-liter Hellcat HEMIs. It is a crate engine, supercharged as standard, producing 1,000 hp (746 kW) and 950 lb⋅ft (1,288 N⋅m) of torque.

=== Marketing ===
From February to April 2005, DaimlerChrysler hosted a "What Can You HEMI?" contest promoting alternative uses of the HEMI engines. The top five finalists include HEMI Snowblower, HEMI-Go-Round carousel, "HEMI on Ice" ice resurfacer, HEMI-Shredder, and HEMI Big Wheel (i.e., the child's tricycle of the 1970s). The winner was the HEMI Big Wheel, which had a 5.7 L Hemi in the back that was installed backwards; thus, reverse became the only forward gear. Plate steel was the predominant material, while a rolled tube of steel had to be utilized for the front tire because there were no such tires 4-foot (122 cm) in diameter that were as narrow as needed for this project.
