= Bushwacker (dragster) =

Overview
- Designer: Pete Ogden

Body and chassis
- Class: Top Fuel
- Body style: Front-engined streamliner dragster

Powertrain
- Engine: Supercharged 392 cu in (6,420 cc) hemi

Dimensions
- Wheelbase: 156 in (4,000 mm)

Chronology
- Successor: Goldfinger

Bushwacker is a pioneering streamliner slingshot dragster.

Originally built by Pete Ogden as Goldfinger, the car had a 156 in (4,000 mm) wheelbase with dropped front axle and bicycle wheels, and an aluminum body (hammered by Arnie Roberts) which left the engine exposed but fendered the slicks.

The car was acquired by Don Honstein in 1965, repainted, and renamed Bushwacker. Driven by Ron Welty, who built the car's supercharged 392 cu in (6,420 cc) Chrysler hemi, Bushwacker competed at three NHRA March Meets (at Bakersfield, California) and at local races before being sold again.

In 2006, it was restored.

== Goldfinger ==
Goldfinger was a pioneering streamliner slingshot dragster.

Built by Pete Ogden to promote Tognotti's Speed Shop (Sacramento, California), the car debuted at the NHRA March Meet in 1964. It had a 156 in (4,000 mm) wheelbase, with dropped front axle and bicycle wheels, and a gold-painted aluminum body (hammered by Arnie Roberts) which left the engine exposed but fendered the slicks.

Power came from a supercharged 392 cu in (6,420 cc) Chrysler hemi built by Ron Welty. The car was driven by Lyle Kelly, and turned in low-8s e.t.s at over 196 mph (315 km/h).
