= Goldfinger v. Feintuch =

1936/1937 New York court case

Goldfinger v. Feintuch (276 N.Y. 281) was a 1936/1937 New York court case that set a legal precedent in the area of labor law, namely that union members were free to peacefully protest, at the retail location, the retail sale of wholesale products that were manufactured by non-union employees.

== Details ==
Isaac Goldfinger, the sole proprietor of a deli at the intersection of Avenue C and East 4th Street in New York City, sold kosher meat produced by W. & I. Blumenthal under the trade name Ukor. It was the only producer of kosher meat sold in the city that was not unionized. Members of the Butchers Union, which was attempting to unionize the company, picketed Goldfinger's store and others selling Ukor meat. As the deli had no employees, it was not subject to union rules; Blumenthal unsuccessfully sought a court injunction against the union, and when this was denied, at their urging Goldfinger applied for one. He was initially successful in obtaining an injunction against Local 174 preventing them from picketing his store, but after an appeal by the union members, in a decision on December 7, 1937, authored by Justice Edward R. Finch and with one dissent, the New York Court of Appeals partially overturned the lower court ruling. The injunction was ruled valid with respect to "obstreperous picketing tactics" that were non-peaceful, but union members were ruled free to picket the retail business in protest of the sale of products by the upstream wholesaler (which thus shared a "unity of [financial] interest" with the retail store(s) which opted to carry their products). The appeals court decision also specified that the protest must not be "directed against" anything but the product being protested (not, for example, against other products sold by the deli such as "the [non-Ukor] brand of bread" or against Goldfinger personally).

== Reaction ==
The Brooklyn Eagle reported the story on the front page, and in an editorial related it to an earlier decision handed down against secondary picketing of its advertisers by ex-employees; the December 20, 1937 issue of Time also mentioned it.

The use of the term "unity of interest" in deciding the Goldfinger case was novel and set a precedent. The case was seen as significant in affirming the right of labor to protest peacefully against not only employers, but retailers selling goods produced by employers with whom the union had a grievance, based on the long-term need for a closed shop in order to secure the right of collective bargaining, and also in setting clear boundaries for such protests. It was noted in contemporary analyses that despite the distinction drawn between picketing against a product rather than the retailer selling it (a secondary boycott), New York State was in the vanguard in affirming the rights of unions to use such tactics. The case was the first test of the so-called "Little Norris—LaGuardia Act", a 1935 New York State anti-injunction statute modeled on the federal Norris–La Guardia Act of 1932.

== See also ==
- Taft-Hartley Labor Act
- Wagner Labor Relations Act
- Clayton Act
