= Plymouth Cabana =

Overview
- Manufacturer: Plymouth
- Production: 1958

Body and chassis
- Class: Concept car
- Body style: 5-door station wagon
- Layout: Front-engine, rear-wheel-drive

The Plymouth Cabana was a 1958 concept car built by Plymouth. It was a station wagon that featured a panoramic glass roof over the rear portion of the car and rear facing 3rd row seats. The initial drawing that inspired the Cabana was done by Chrysler stylist John Samsen. The Cabana was reportedly built by Ghia in Italy, based on a 1958 Plymouth rolling chassis, but was never fitted with a drivetrain. It was reportedly never shown outside of the Chrysler design studio and was later scrapped.
