= Savage GT =

Defunct American motor vehicle manufacturer

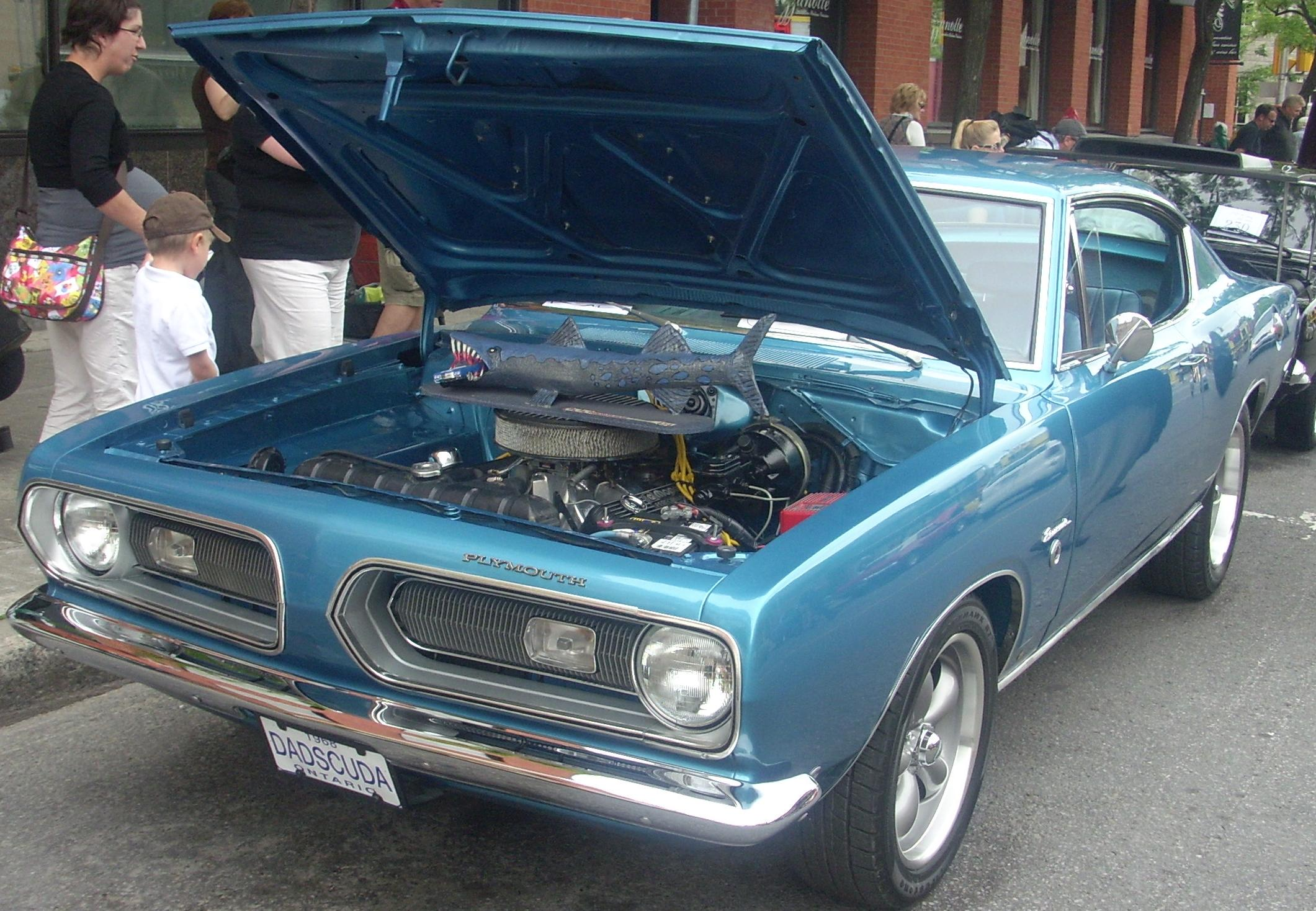
1968 Plymouth Barracuda photographed in Ottawa, Ontario, Canada at the Byward Market Auto Classic 2009

The Savage GT was a two-door compact/midsize car built by the company AutoCraft in either Fond du Lac or Milwaukee, Wisconsin from 1968 through 1969 by heavily modifying a Plymouth Barracuda of the same years.

It had wire wheels, lake pipes, a fibreglass trunk lid with molded spoiler, a modified grille, and a roll bar that wraps around the outside of the seats just at the level of the seat bottom. The tail panel and grille had "Savage" badges. It was available with 340, 383, and modified 440 Magnum Chrysler engines.

The Savage GT is featured in the December 1991 issue of Mopar Collector's Guide. In the article it states that only 10 to 13 were originally built, yet it gives no breakdown by engines nor transmission. There were nine 340's, three 383's, and one 440 built. Currently there are 3 known to exist as of 2013, two 340 and one 383 car. With only 1 of them being built for racing.

Original advertisements for the Savage GT can be found at Hamtramck Historical.
