= John Herlitz =

American automobile designer (1942–2008)

John E. Herlitz
- Born: December 30, 1942; Pine Plains, NY
- Died: March 24, 2008; Naples, Fl
- Occupations: Designer; Chrysler Senior Vice President of Design

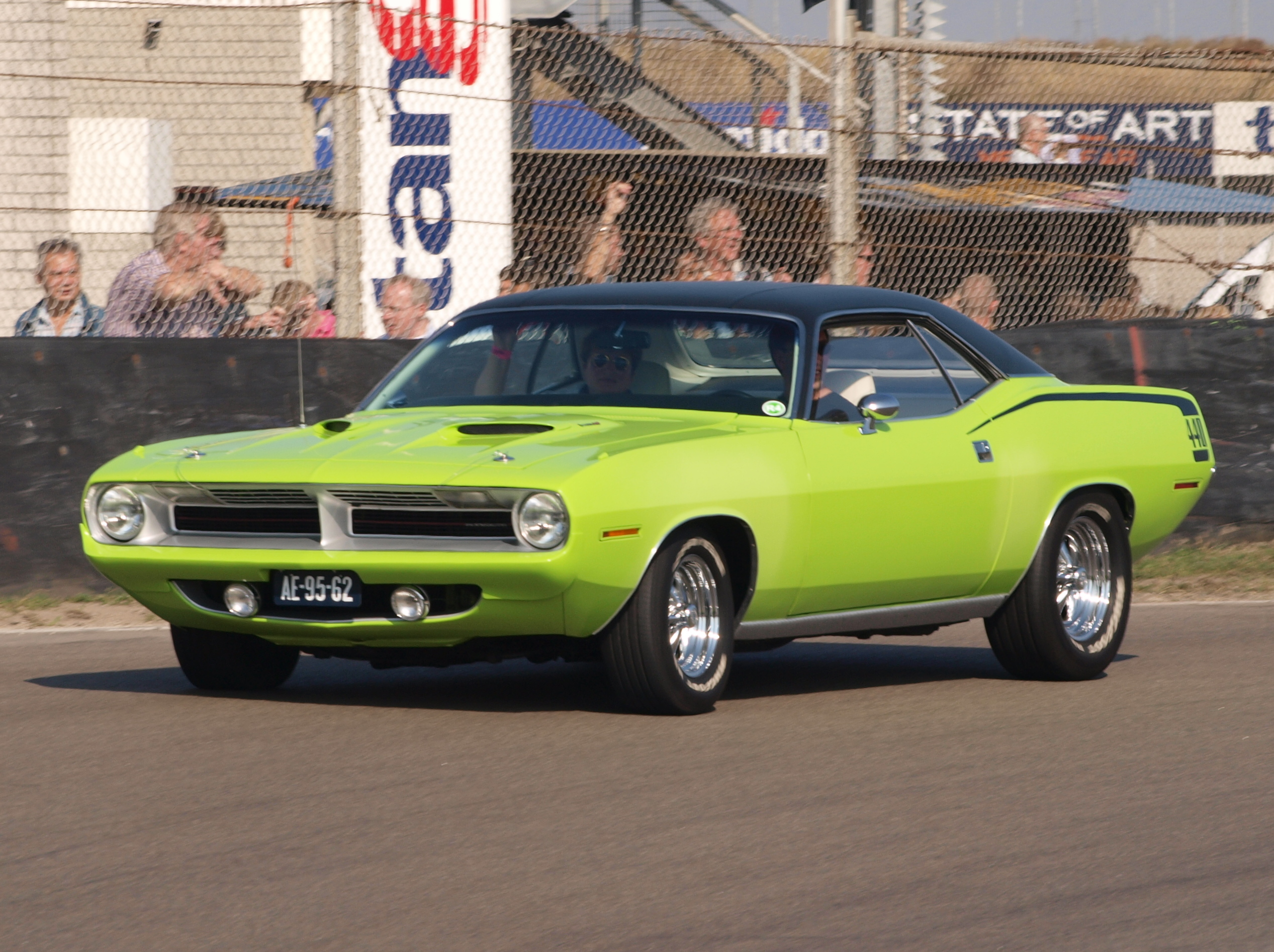
Plymouth Barracuda

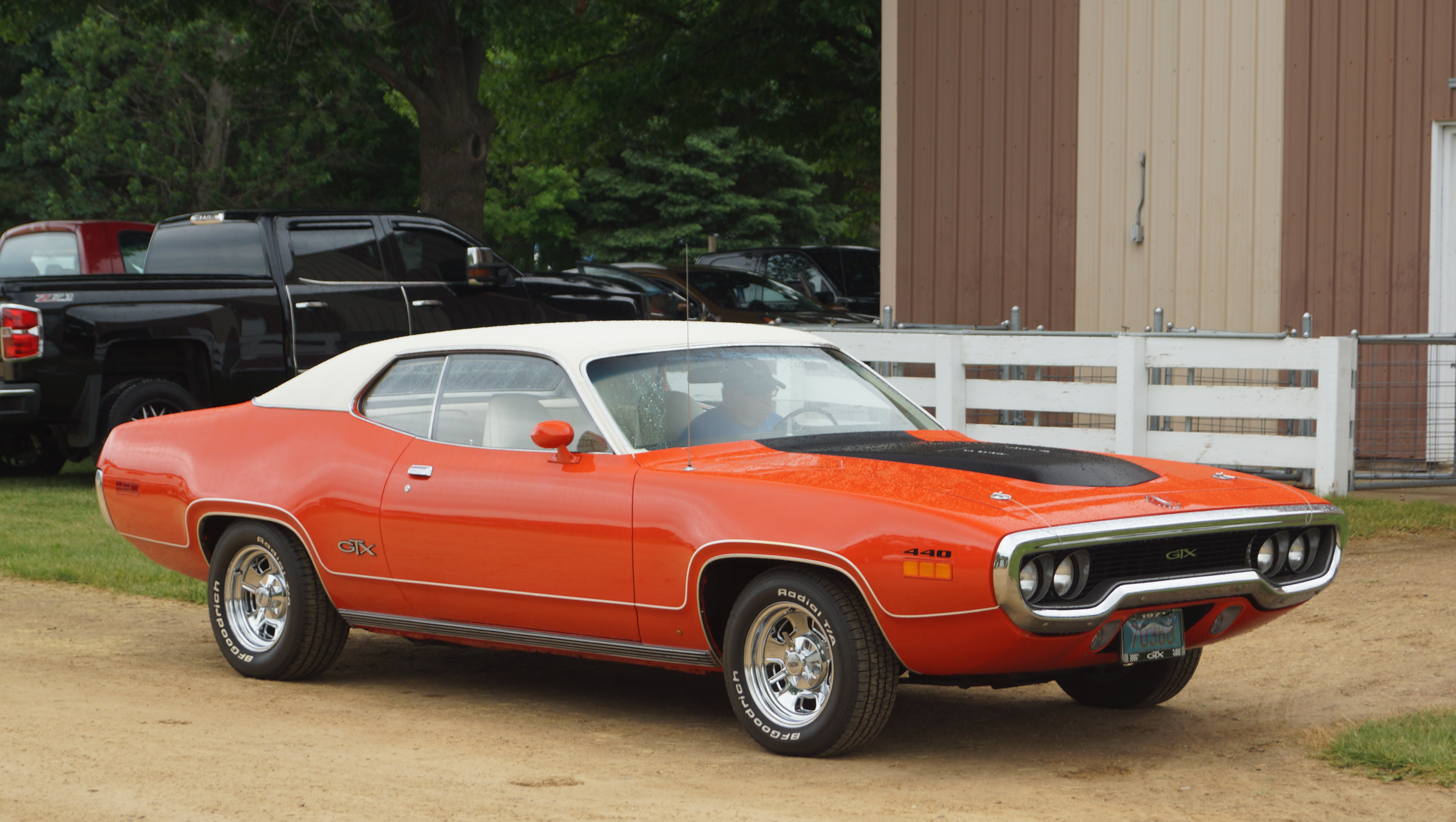
1971 Plymouth GTX

John Eric Herlitz (December 30, 1942 – March 24, 2008) was an American automobile designer most commonly known for his styling of cars at Chrysler Corporation, particularly the Plymouth Barracuda production car and Dodge Copperhead concept car.

== Early life ==
Herlitz was born to Swedish immigrants in Pine Plains, New York, and attended the nearby Salisbury School. At 13, he started sending sketches of cars to Chrysler. Company officials told him what education they would seek for stylists, and he proceeded to get a bachelor's degree in industrial design from the Pratt Institute.

== Career ==
Immediately upon graduation in 1964, Herlitz started working for Plymouth, where he created the Barracuda SX show car (which greatly influenced the 1967 second-generation Plymouth Barracuda). Herlitz was then called to the National Guard before returning to Plymouth, where he led the styling of the completely new 1970 third-generation Barracuda (and 'Cuda). Following the 1970 Barracuda, Herlitz led the styling for the 1971 Plymouth GTX and Plymouth Road Runner. He assumed progressive responsibility in the design studios, working on the styling of successive generations of vehicles including the K-cars, minivans, and cab forward cars as well as various concept cars. In 1994, Herlitz was named vice president for product design, working directly under former engineer Tom Gale; he was later promoted to senior vice-president for product design.

In his later years at Chrysler, he helped to establish the Walter P. Chrysler Museum, where his retirement party was held in November 2000. In January 2001, he officially retired from Chrysler.

== After Chrysler ==
Afterwards, he helped to design a visual arts building in Michigan, served on the Interlochen Center for the Arts' corporate advisory council, and was a judge in some car shows.

== Personal life ==
Mr. Herlitz married Joan Elizabeth Neinas on September 20, 1969, and had two sons and two grandchildren. He died in 2008 from complications after a fall in his winter home in Florida.
