= Plymouth Barracuda =

Car model built by Chrysler Corporation

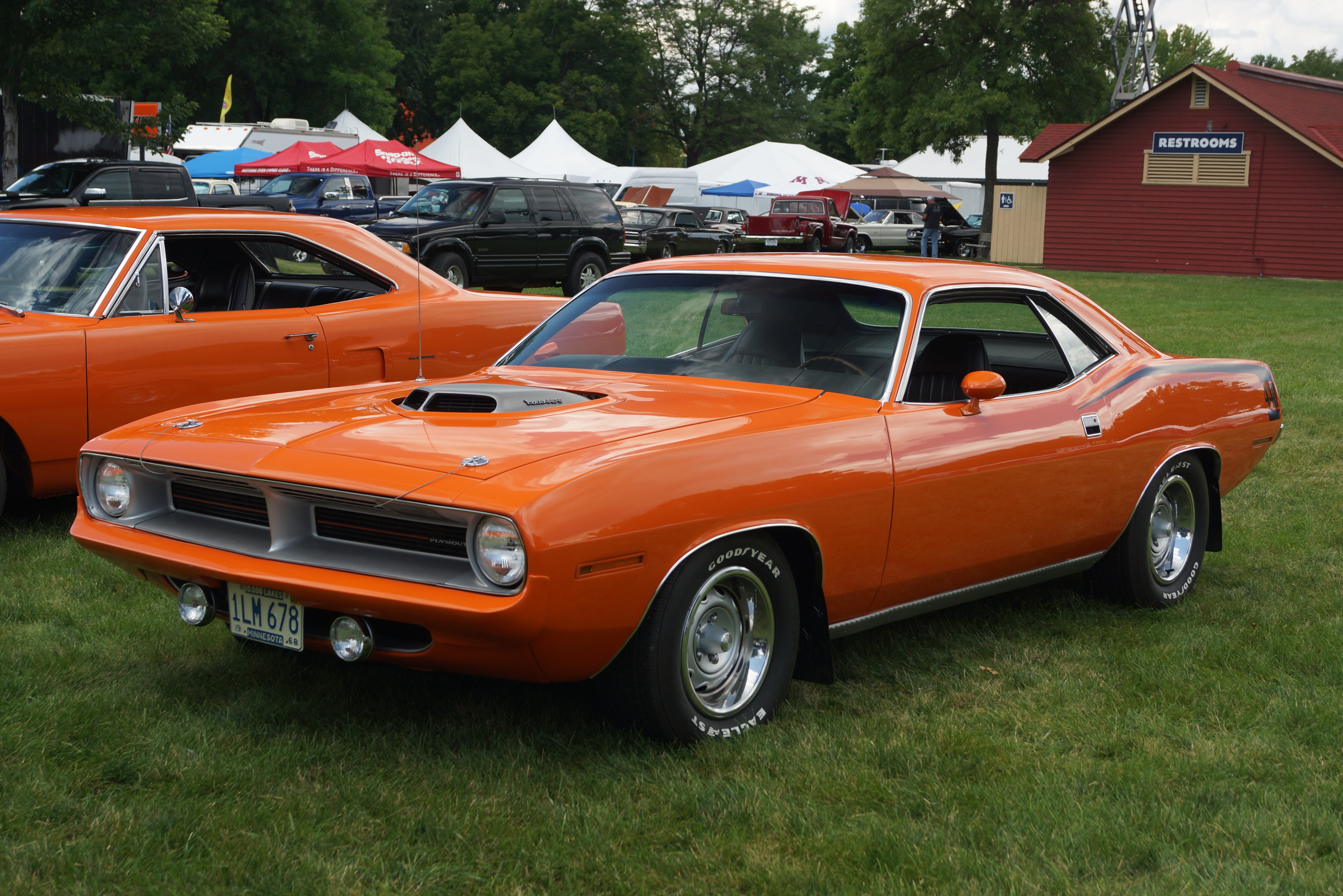
- 1970 Plymouth Barracuda Hardtop Coupe

Overview
- Manufacturer: Plymouth (Chrysler)
- Production: 1964–1974
- Assembly: United States: Fenton, Missouri (Saint Louis Assembly); United States: Hamtramck, Michigan, (Dodge Factory); United States: Maywood, California, (Los Angeles Assembly); Canada: Windsor, Ontario(Windsor Assembly)

Body and chassis
- Class: Pony car
- Layout: FR layout

The Plymouth Barracuda is a two-door pony car that was manufactured by Chrysler Corporation from 1964 through 1974 model years.

The first-generation Barracuda was based on the Chrysler A-body and was offered from 1964 until 1966. A two-door hardtop (no B-pillar) fastback design, it shared a great majority of parts and bodywork with the Plymouth Valiant, except for the distinctive wraparound rear glass.

The second-generation Barracuda, though still Valiant-based, was heavily redesigned. Built from 1967 through 1969, it was available as a two-door in fastback, notchback, and convertible versions.

The third generation, offered from 1970 until 1974, was based on the Chrysler E-body, exclusive to it, and the slightly larger Dodge Challenger. A completely new design, the two-door Barracuda was available in hardtop and convertible body styles.

== First generation (1964–1966) ==
First generation
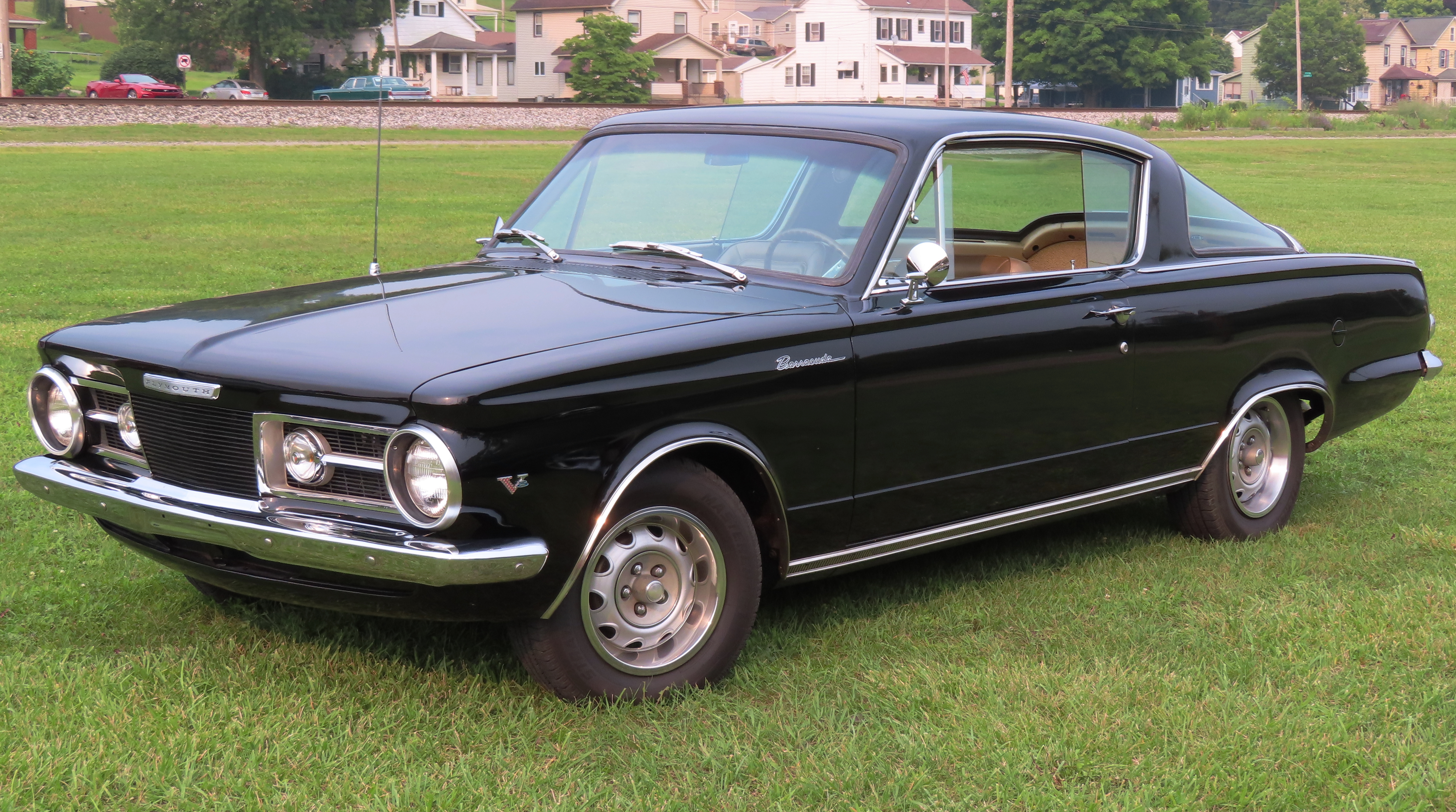
- 1964 Plymouth Barracuda

Overview
- Production: 1964–1966
- Designer: Elwood Engel, Milt Antonick

Body and chassis
- Body style: 2-door fastback coupe
- Platform: A-body
- Related: Plymouth Valiant

Powertrain
- Engine: 170 cu in (2.8 L) Slant-6; 225 cu in (3.7 L) Slant-6; 273 cu in (4.5 L) LA V8

Dimensions
- Wheelbase: 106 in (2,692 mm)
- Length: 188 in (4,775 mm)
- Width: 70 in (1,778 mm)
- Height: 52.5 in (1,334 mm)
- Curb weight: 3,100 lb (1,406 kg) as tested

=== 1964 ===
During the development of the Barracuda, one of the worst-kept secrets was Ford's plan to introduce a new sporty compact car based on the inexpensive Falcon chassis and running gear (which was eventually released as the Mustang in mid-model year 1964); the extent of the other changes was not known. Chrysler stylist Irv Ritchie sketched a fastback version of the compact Valiant. Budgets were limited due to research and development of the Chrysler Turbine Car, but the company's executives wanted to have an entry in this emerging and potentially lucrative sporty-compact car market segment, beginning by siphoning off some of the Chevrolet's Corvair Monza's sales. Plymouth's executives had wanted to name the new model Panda, an idea unpopular with its designers. In the end, John Samsen's suggestion of Barracuda prevailed.

Based on Chrysler's A-body, the Barracuda debuted in fastback form on April 1, 1964. The new model used the Valiant's 106 in (2,692 mm) wheelbase and the Valiant hood, headlamp bezels, windshield, vent windows, quarter panels, doors, A-pillar, and bumpers; the trunk and some of the glass was new. Using the same hybrid design approach as Ford did turning its Falcon into the Mustang significantly reduced Plymouth's development and tooling cost and time for the new model. The greatest effort was put into creating its distinguishing 14.4 sq ft (1.34 m^{2}) rear window, a collaboration between Pittsburgh Plate Glass (PPG) and Chrysler designers that created the largest ever installed on a standard production car to that time.

Powertrains were identical to the Valiant's, including two versions of Chrysler's slant-6 six-cylinder engine. The standard-equipment engine had a displacement of 170 cu in (2.8 L) and an output of 101 bhp (75 kW); the 225 cu in (3.7 L) option raised the power output to 145 bhp (108 kW).

The highest-power option for 1964 was Chrysler's all-new 273 cu in (4.5 L) LA V8. A compact and relatively light engine equipped with a two-barrel carburetor, it produced 180 bhp (130 kW). The Barracuda sold for a base price of US$2,512 ($26,000 today).

The 1964 model year was the first for the Barracuda and also the last year for push-button control of the optional Torqueflite automatic transmission. This year also marked the first use of the smaller "TorqueFlite 6" (A904) transmission behind a V8.

In the marketplace, the Barracuda was obviously a fastback version of the Valiant that had a frugal family transportation image. The sales brochure for the first Barracudas pitched it as a car "for people of all ages and interests." The more sporty Mustang was marketed with abundant advertising to young professionals and with its youthful image proved widely successful following its mid-1964 introduction. This became known as the "pony car" niche of modestly appointed compact-sized sedans and convertibles, which came with standard 6-cylinder engines and basic interiors, but could be outfitted with powerful V8s and "custom" appointments and luxury features. The success of the Mustang has long obscured the fact that the Barracuda actually predated Ford's introduction by two weeks. The abbreviated sales season for the 1964 Barracuda totaled 23,443 units compared to the 126,538 Mustangs sold during the same time.

=== 1965 ===
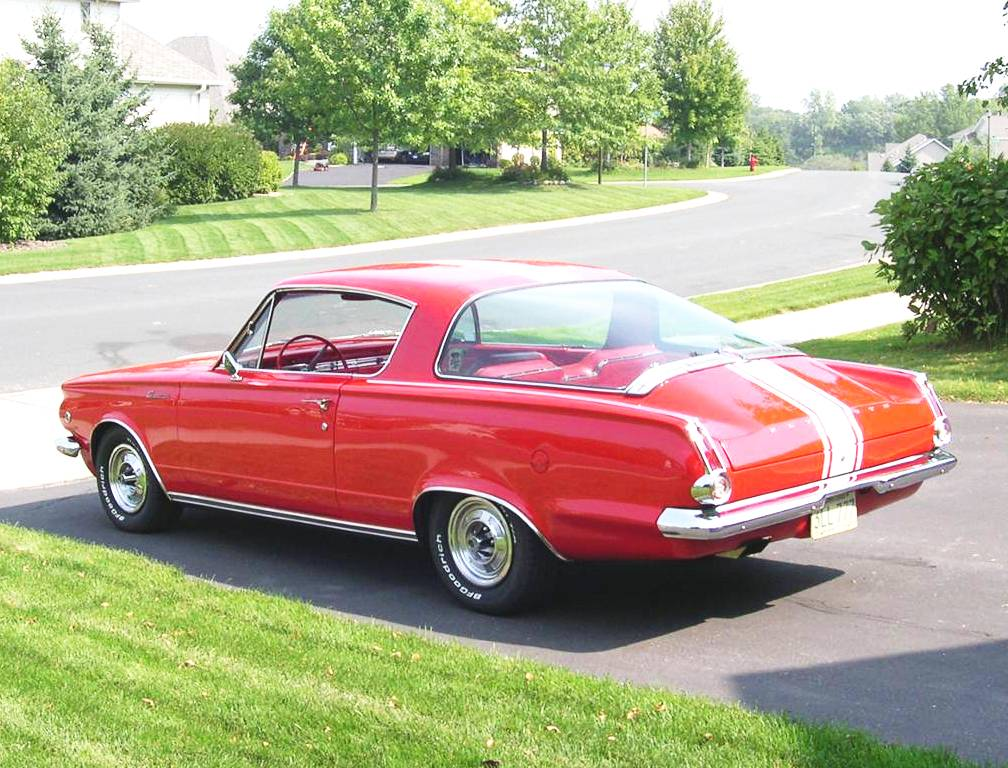
1965 Barracuda Formula S

In 1965, the 225 slant-6 became the base engine for the U.S. market, though the 170 cu in (2.8 L) remained the base engine in Canada.

New options were introduced for the Barracuda as the competition among pony cars intensified. The 273 engine was made available as an upgraded Commando version with a four-barrel carburetor, 10.5:1 compression, and a more aggressive camshaft, still with solid tappets. These and other upgrades increased the engine's output to 235 bhp (175 kW).

A new Formula 'S' package included the Commando V8 engine, suspension upgrades, larger wheels and tires, special emblems, and a tachometer. Disc brakes and factory-installed air conditioning became available after the start of the 1965 model year.

=== 1966 ===
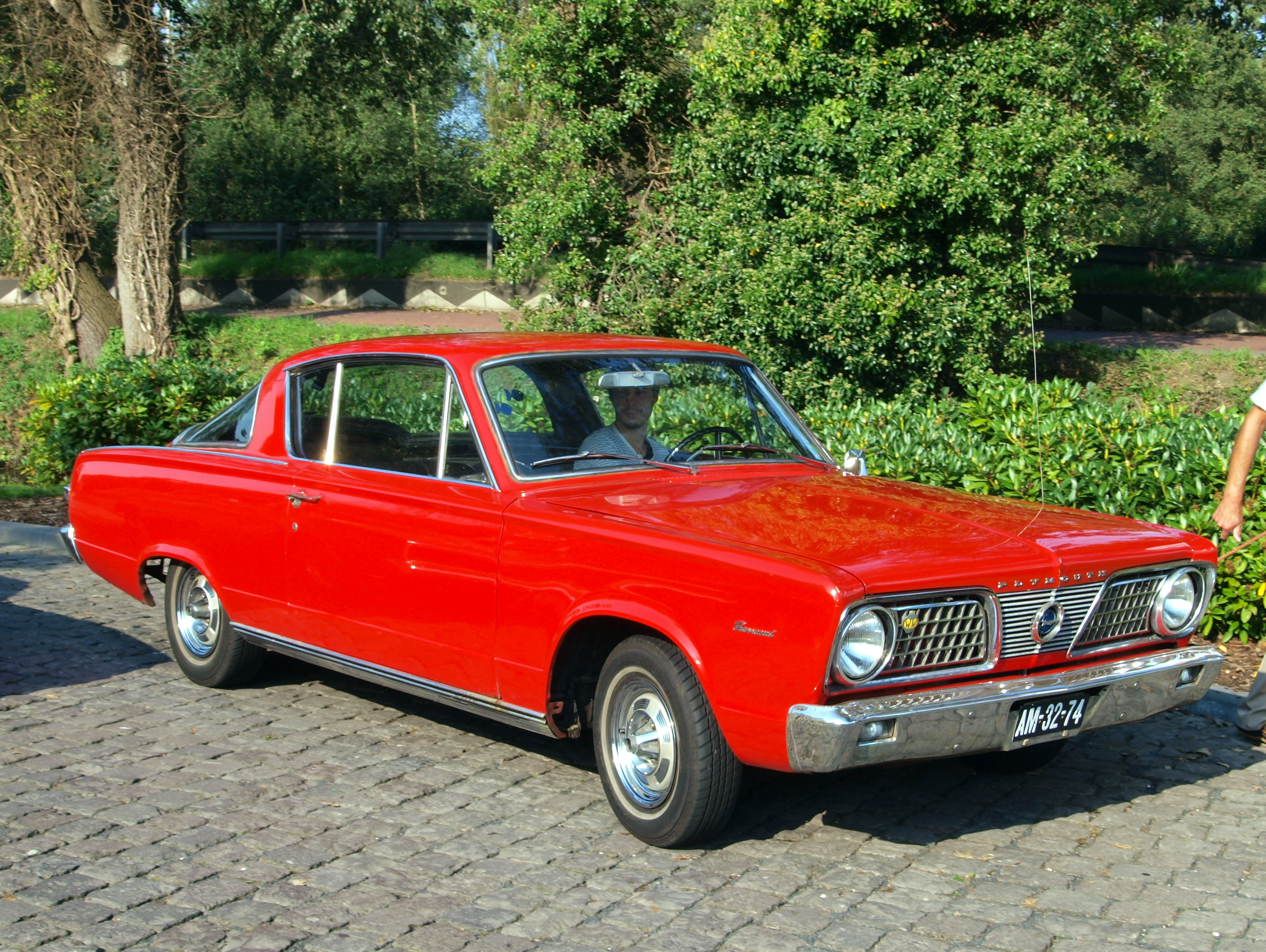
1966 Plymouth Barracuda

For the 1966 model year the Barracuda received new taillamps, new front sheet metal, and a new instrument panel. The latter had room for oil pressure and tachometer gauges on models so equipped. The 1966 front sheet metal which, except for the grille, was shared with the Valiant, gave a more rectilinear contour to the fenders. Deluxe models featured fender-top turn signal indicators with a stylized fin motif. The bumpers were larger, and the grille featured a strong grid theme. A center console was optional for the first time.

Although the first Barracudas were heavily based on the contemporary Valiants, Plymouth wanted them perceived as distinct models. Consequently, the "Valiant" chrome script that appeared on the 1964 1/2 model's trunk lid was phased out at the end of the 1965 model year in the U.S. market, and the large stylized "V" trim above the deck lid was changed to a unique Barracuda fish logo for 1966, though in markets such as Canada and South Africa, where Valiant was a marque in its own right, the car remained badged as Valiant Barracuda until the A-body Barracuda was discontinued.

=== Engines ===
| Engine | Year | Power |
|---|---|---|
| 170 Inline 6 | 1964 | 101 hp (75 kW) |
| 225 Inline 6 | 1964 -1966 | 145 hp (108 kW) |
| 273 V8 | 1964 -1966 | 180 hp (130 kW) |
| 273 V8 | 1965 -1966 | 235 hp (175 kW) |

== Second generation (1967–1969) ==
Second generation
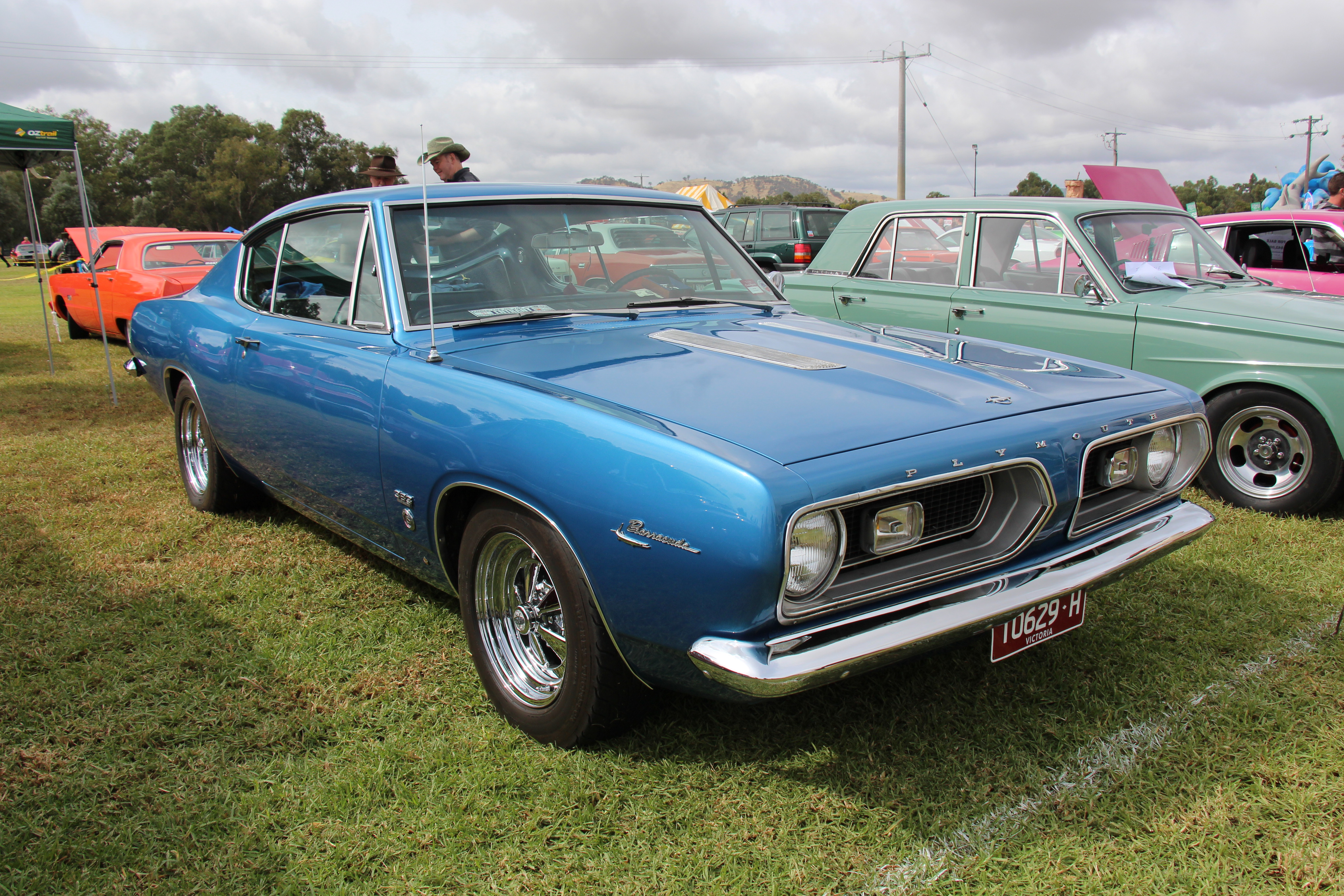
- 1967 Plymouth Barracuda Formula S Fastback

Overview
- Production: 1967–1969
- Designer: John Herlitz, John Samsen, Milt Antonick

Body and chassis
- Body style: 2-door fastback coupe 2-door hardtop coupe 2-door convertible
- Platform: A-body
- Related: Dodge Dart; Plymouth Valiant

Powertrain
- Engine: 225 cu in (3.7 L) Slant-6; 273 cu in (4.5 L) LA V8; 318 cu in (5.2 L) LA V8; 340 cu in (5.6 L) LA V8; 383 cu in (6.3 L) B V8; 440 cu in (7.2 L) RB V8; 426 cu in (7.0 L) 2x4bbl HEMI RB V8

Dimensions
- Wheelbase: 108 in (2,743 mm)

=== 1967 ===
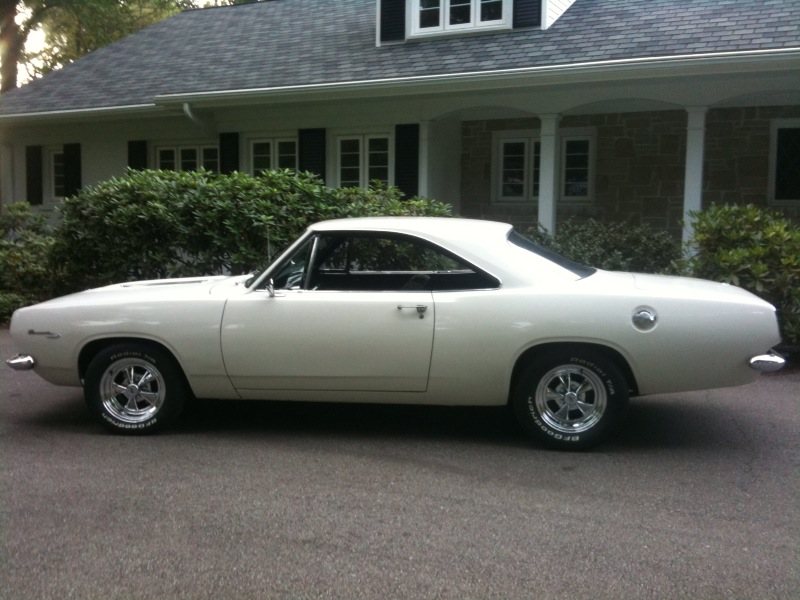
1967 Barracuda notchback hardtop

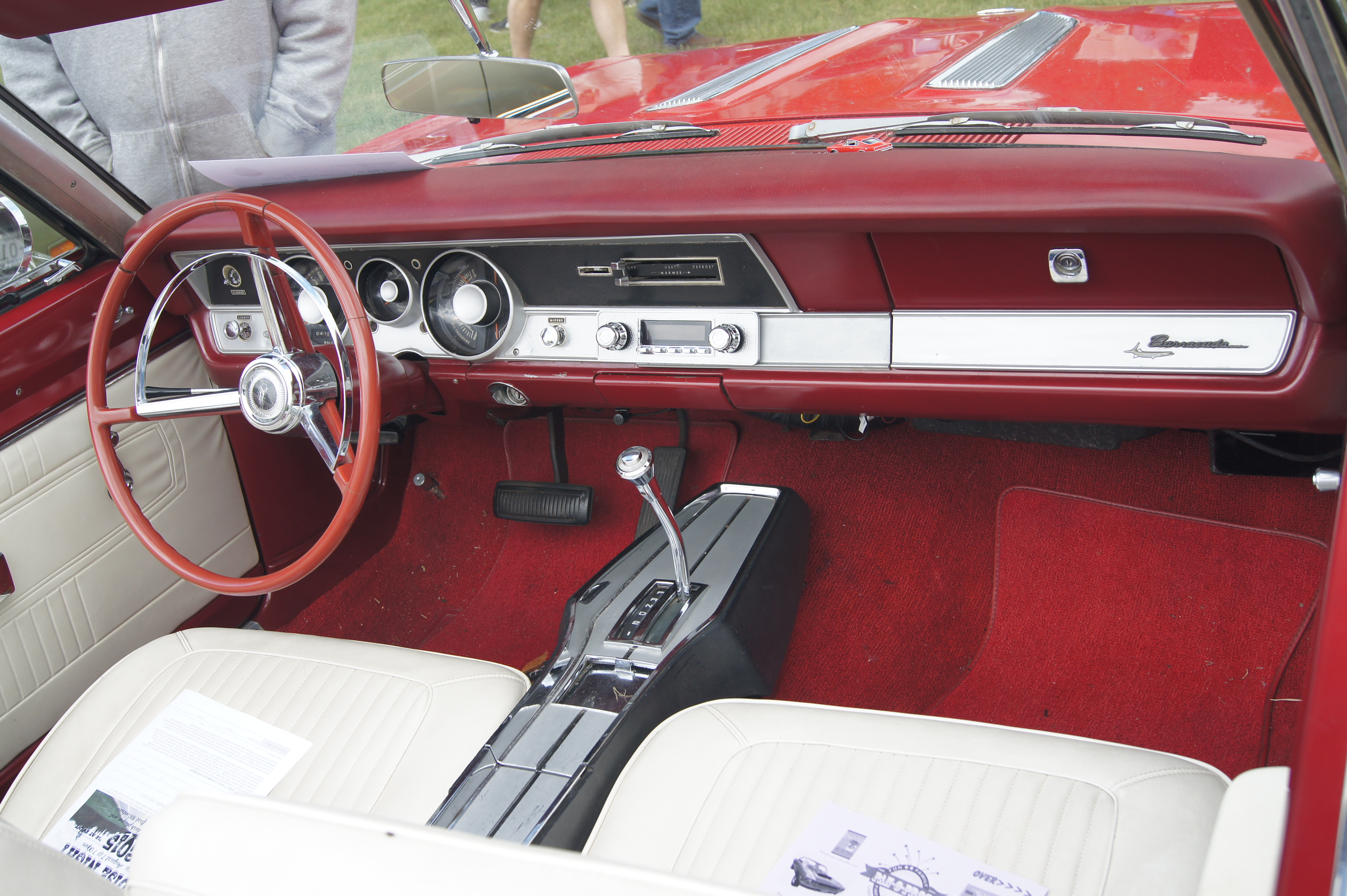
1967 Barracuda interior

The second-generation Barracuda was redesigned with model-specific sheet metal, yet still shared many components with the Valiant. It rode on a 108 in (2,743 mm) wheelbase A-body and was available as a convertible, and a notchback coupe, in addition to the fastback design.

The new Barracuda was chiefly the work of John E. Herlitz and John Samsen, with Coke-bottle side contours and heavily revised front and rear ends. Design changes included wider wheel openings, curved side glass, and S-curved roof pillars on the hardtop.

The roofline on the fastback coupe was more streamlined, more steeply raked, and with a much smaller flush rear window in place of the distinctive massive wraparound in the original model. Also, the overall use of chrome trim was more restrained.

During this time the first U.S. Federal auto safety standards were phased in, and Chrysler's response a requirement for side-marker lights distinguishes each model year of the second-generation Barracuda:

- 1967: no sidemarker lamps or reflectors, and backup lights on the rear valance by the license plate.
- 1968: round side marker lamps without reflectors, mostly white tail lamps with backup lights in the tail lamp housing.
- 1969: little changes on the front grille, rectangular side marker reflectors without lamps, and the backup lamps were moved back to the rear valance by the license plate.

As the pony-car class became established and competition increased, Plymouth began to revise the Barracuda's engine options.

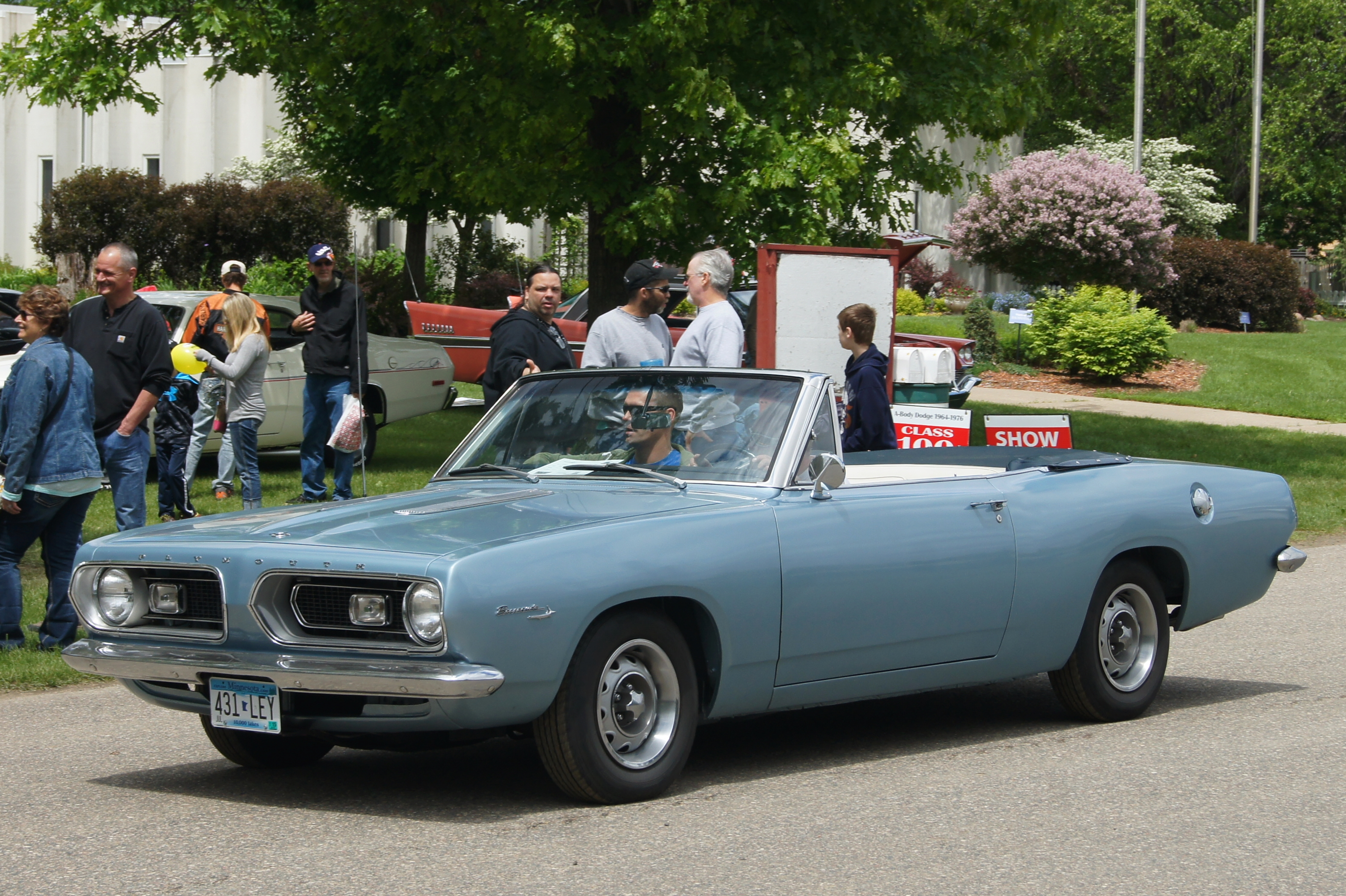
1967 Barracuda convertible

In 1967, while the 225 cu in (3.7 L) slant-6 was still the base engine, the V8 options ranged from the two- and four-barrel versions of the 273 cu in (4.5 L) to a seldom-ordered 383 cu in (6.3 L) "B" big-block, rated at 280 bhp (209 kW), the latter available only with the Formula S package.

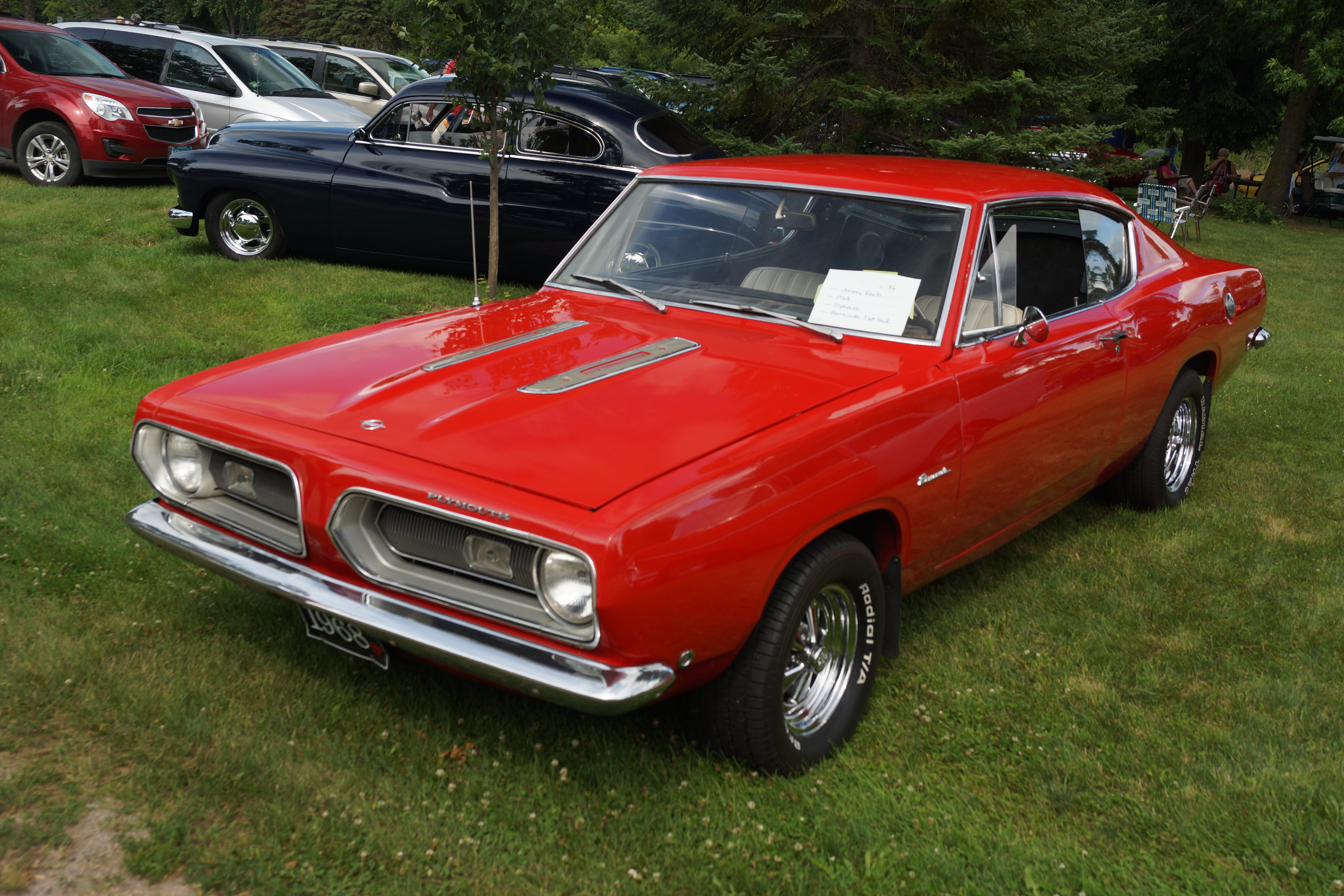
1968 Barracuda

=== 1968 ===
In 1968, the 273 was replaced by the 318 cu in (5.2 L) LA engine as the smallest V8 available, and the new 340 cu in (5.6 L) LA four-barrel was released. The 383 Super Commando engine was upgraded with the intake manifold, camshaft, and cylinder heads from the Road Runner and Super Bee, but the more restrictive exhaust manifolds specific to the A-body cars limited its output to 300 bhp (224 kW).

Also in 1968, Chrysler made approximately fifty fastback Barracudas equipped with the 426 cu in (7.0 L) Hemi for Super Stock drag racing. These cars were assembled by Hurst Performance and featured items such as lightweight Chemcor side glass, fiberglass front fenders, fiberglass hood with scoop, and lightweight front seats, and street features such as rear seats and sound deadener omitted. An included sticker indicated that the car was not for use on public roads; it could run the quarter-mile in the mid-tens in 1968.

For the South African export market, a 190 bhp (142 kW) high-performance version of the 225 slant-6 called Charger Power was offered with 9.3:1 compression, two-barrel carburetor, more aggressive camshaft, and low-restriction exhaust system. A handful of Savage GTs were also built from the second-generation Barracuda.

=== 1969 ===
In 1969, Plymouth placed an increased emphasis on performance. A new option was the Mod Top, a vinyl roof covering with a floral motif, available in 1969 and 1970. Plymouth sold it as a package with seat and door panel inserts done in the same pattern.

The 1969 version of the 383 engine was upgraded to increase power output to 330 bhp (246 kW), and a new trim package called 'Cuda was released. The 'Cuda, based on the Formula S option, was available with either the 340, 383 and, new for 1969, the 440 Super Commando V8.

=== Engines ===
| Engine | Year | Power |
|---|---|---|
| 225 Inline 6 | 1967-1969 | 145 hp (108 kW) |
| 273 V8 | 1967 | 180 hp (130 kW) |
| 273 V8 | 1967 | 235 hp (175 kW) |
| 318 V8 | 1968-1969 | 230 hp (170 kW) |
| 340 V8 | 1968-1969 | 275 hp (205 kW) |
| 383 V8 | 1967 | 280 hp (210 kW) |
| 383 V8 | 1968 | 300 hp (220 kW) |
| 383 V8 | 1969 | 330 hp (250 kW) |
| 440 V8 | 1969 | 380 hp (280 kW) |

== Third generation (1970–1974) ==
Third generation
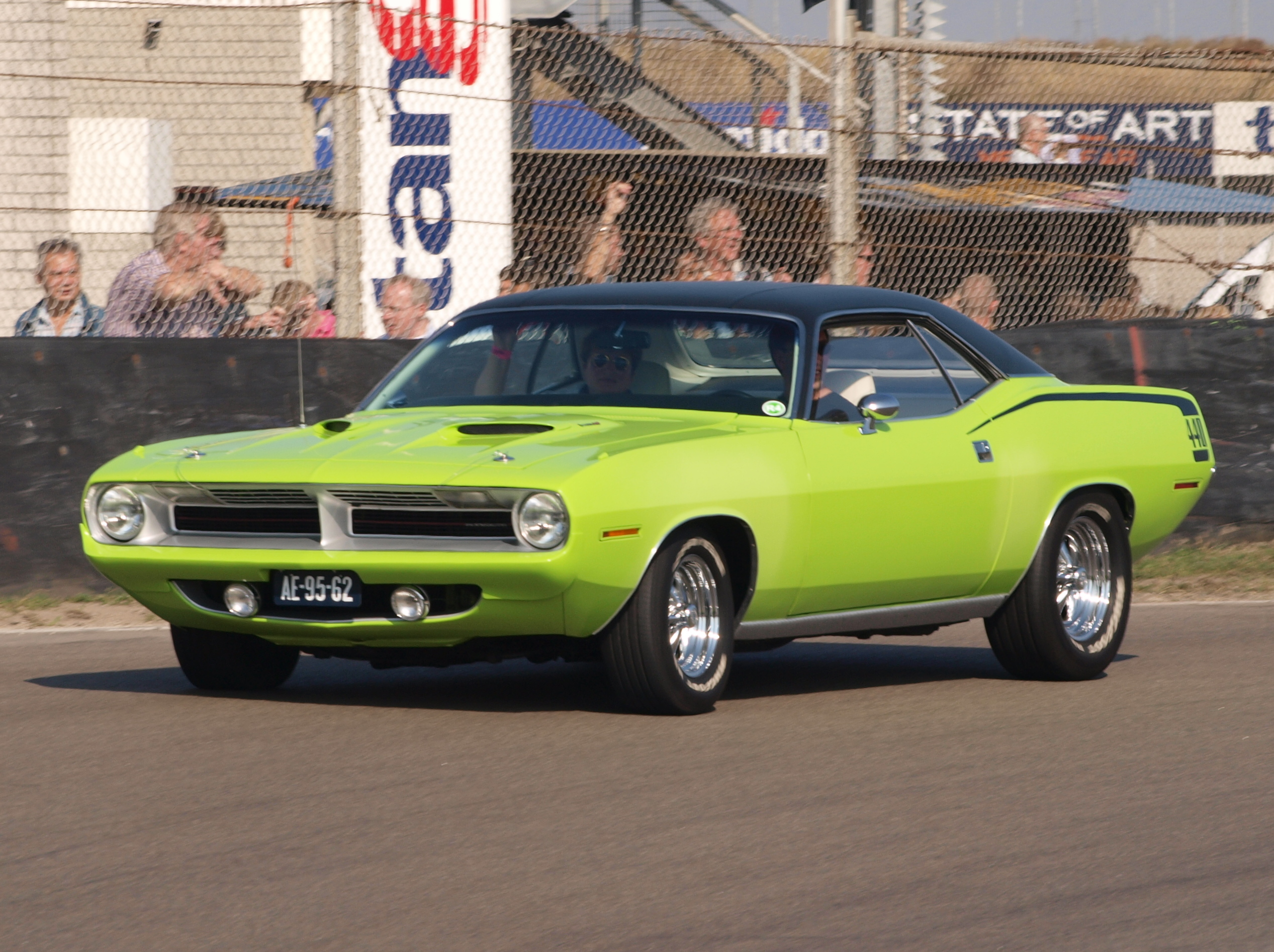
- 1970 Plymouth 440 'Cuda

Overview
- Production: 1970–1974
- Designer: John Herlitz

Body and chassis
- Body style: 2-door hardtop coupe 2-door convertible (Dodge Main Assembly Hamtramck, MI plant only)
- Platform: E-body
- Related: Dodge Challenger

Powertrain
- Engine: 198 cu in (3.2 L) Slant-6; 225 cu in (3.7 L) Slant-6; 318 cu in (5.2 L) LA V8; 340 cu in (5.6 L) LA V8; 360 cu in (5.9 L) LA V8; 383 cu in (6.3 L) B V8; 426 cu in (7.0 L) Hemi V8; 440 cu in (7.2 L) RB V8
- Transmission: 3-speed manual 4-speed manual 3-speed TorqueFlite automatic

Dimensions
- Wheelbase: 108.0 in (2.74 m)
- Length: 186.6 in (4.74 m)
- Width: 74.9 in (1.90 m)
- Height: 50.9 in (1.29 m)
- Curb weight: 3,395 lb (1,540 kg)

=== 1970–1971 ===
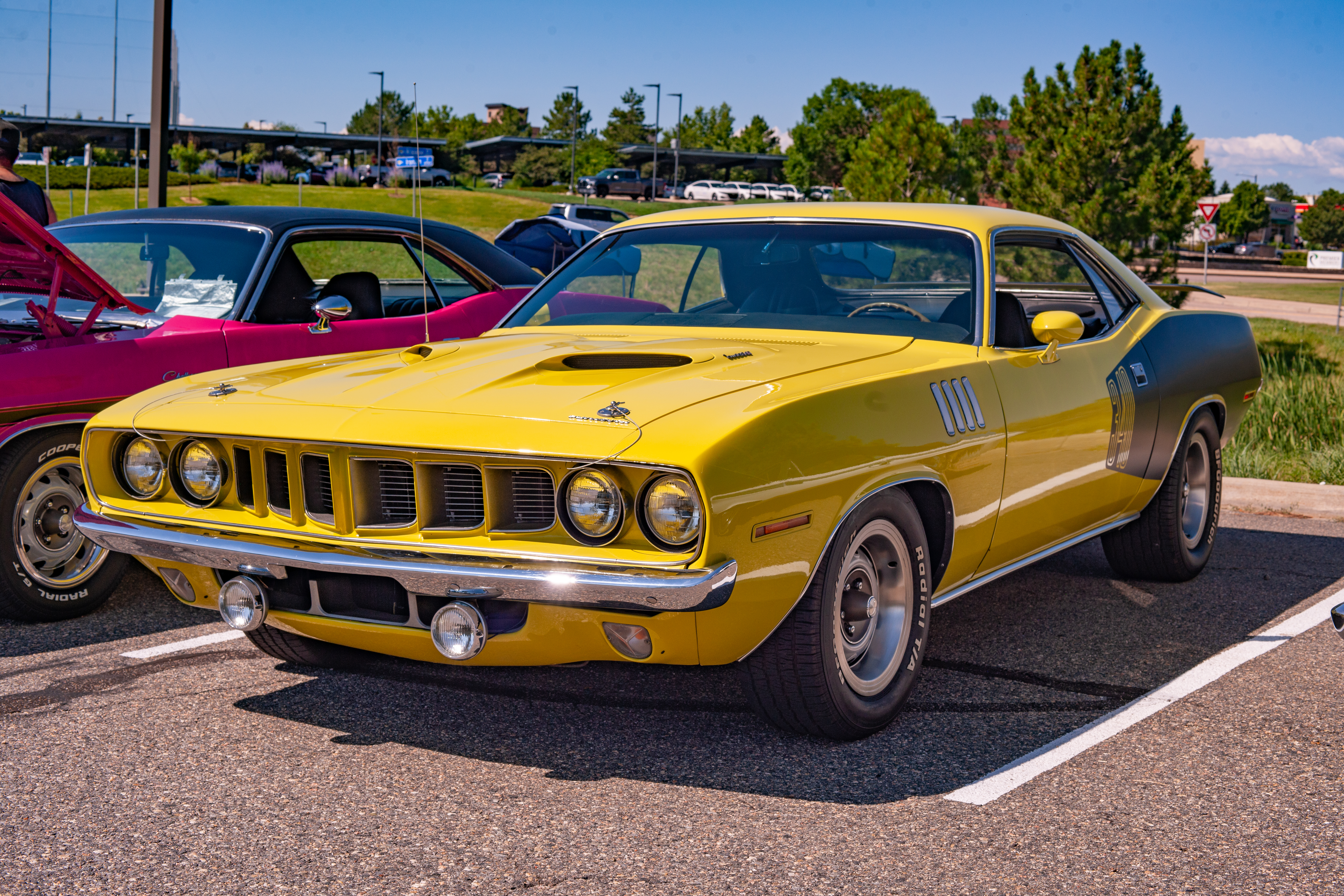
1971 Plymouth Cuda 340

The all-new 1970 Barracuda was styled by John E. Herlitz and built on a shorter, wider version of Chrysler's existing B platform, called the E-body. The redesign removed all previous commonality with the Valiant. The fastback model was deleted from the line and the Barracuda was only offered in coupe and convertible models. Though sharing its platform with the newly launched Dodge Challenger, no exterior sheet-metal was shared between the two. The Challenger's 110-inch (2.79 m) wheelbase was 2 inches (5.1 cm) longer than the Barracuda's, and its body 5 inches (12.7 cm) longer.

The E-body Barracuda was thus "able to shake the stigma of 'economy car'". Three versions were offered for 1970 and 1971: the base Barracuda (BH), the luxury oriented Gran Coupe (BP), and the sport model 'Cuda (BS).

Beginning mid-year 1970, and ending with the 1971 model, there also was the Barracuda Coupe (A93), a low-end model with the 198 cu in (3.2 L) Slant Six as a base engine, lower-grade interior, and (like other Coupe series Chrysler offered that year) had fixed quarter glass instead of roll-down rear passenger windows. The high-performance models were marketed as 'Cuda deriving from the 1969 option. The E-body's engine bay was larger than that of the previous A-body, facilitating the use of Chrysler's 426 cu in (7.0 L) Hemi.

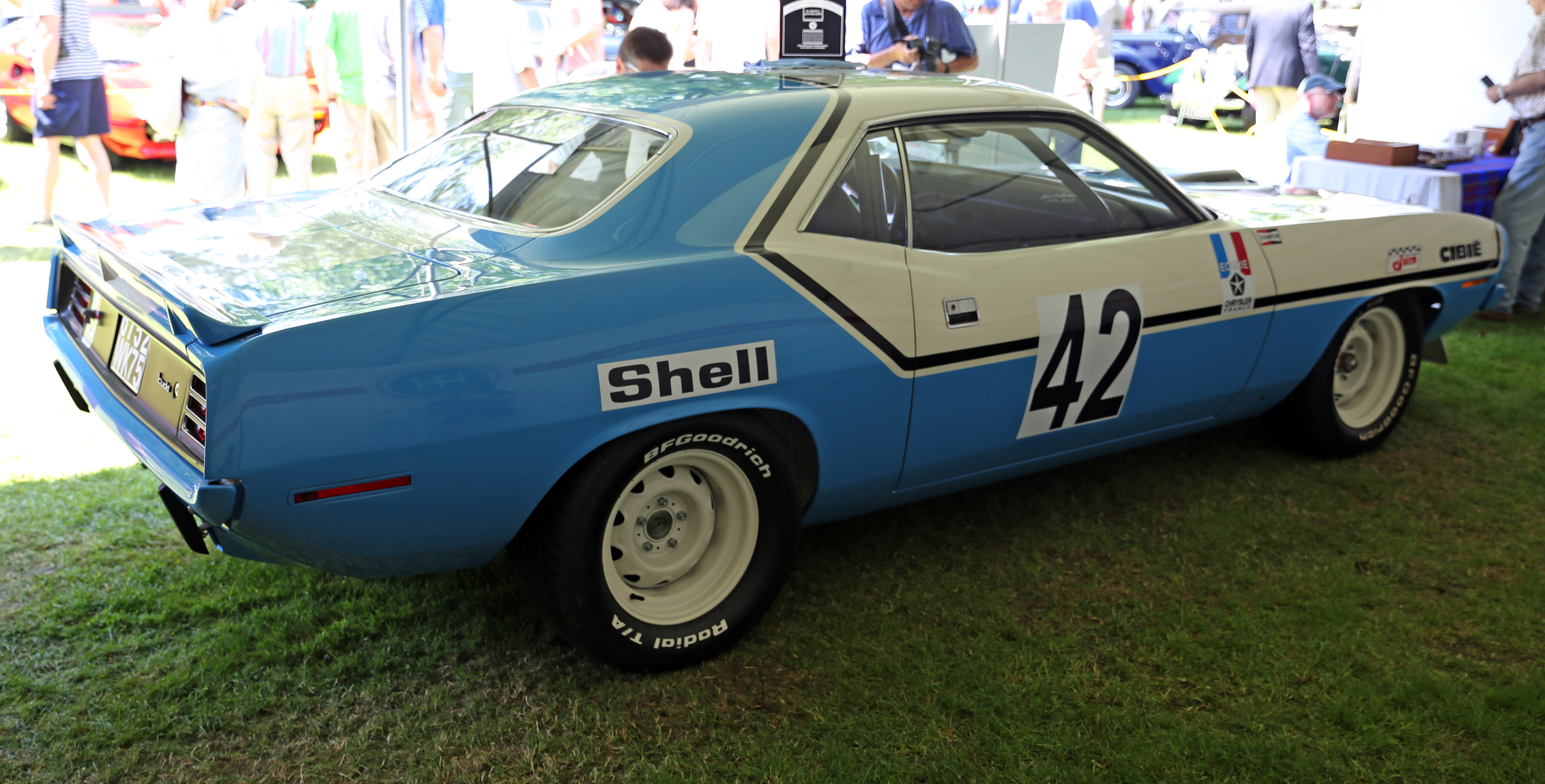
1970 Plymouth Hemi 'Cuda, raced by the Chrysler France works team in 1970-1973

For 1970 and 1971, the Barracuda and Barracuda Gran Coupe had two slant I6 engines available — a new 198 cu in (3.2 L) version and the previous 225 — as well as four V8 options: the 318 CID, the 383 cu in (6.3 L) with a two-barrel carburetor and single exhaust, the 383 with a four-barrel and dual exhausts, and the 383 Magnum with a four-barrel and dual exhausts, producing 330 hp (246 kW) SAE gross.

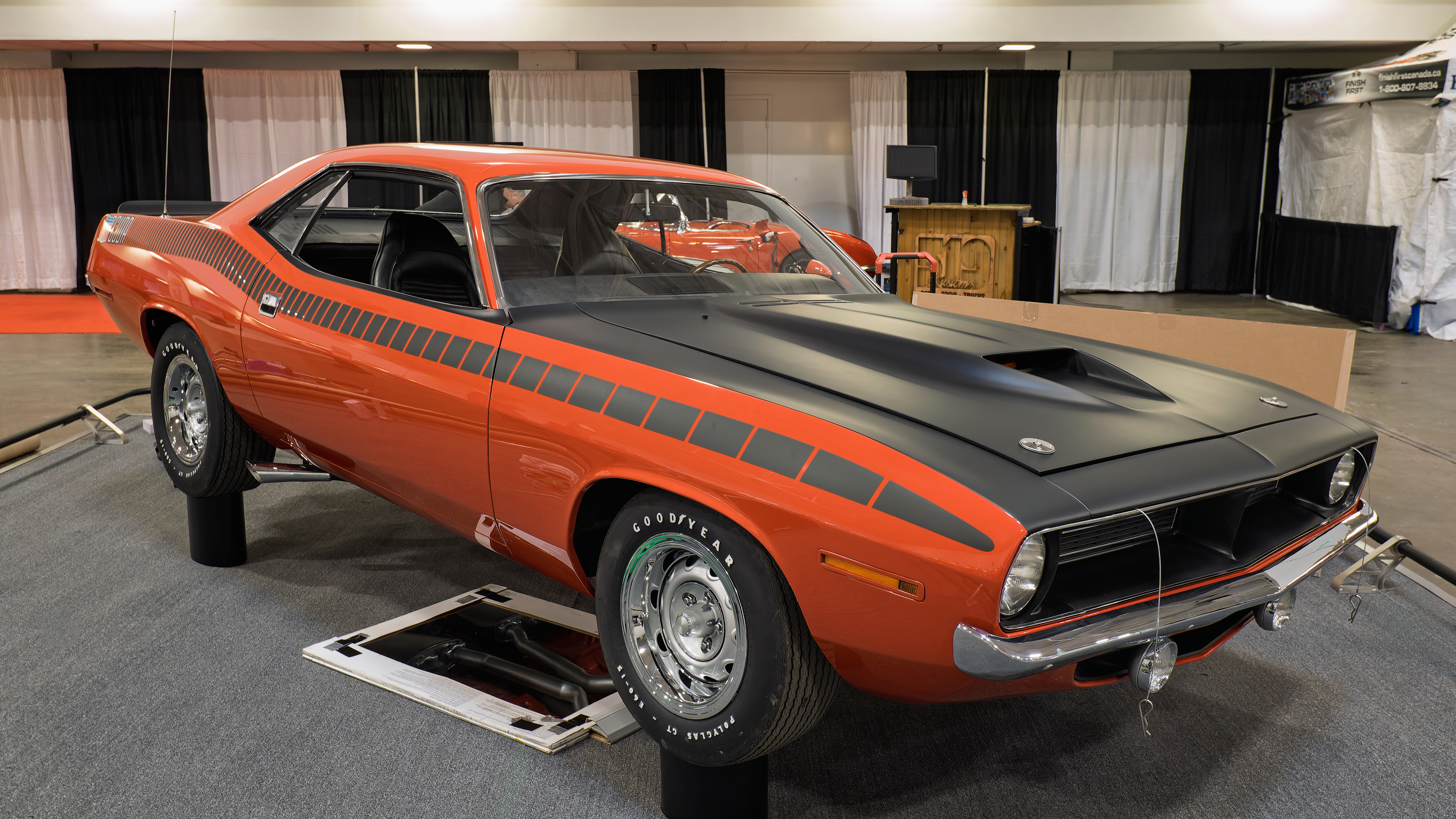
1970 homologation AAR 'Cuda

The 'Cuda model had the 383 335 hp (250 kW) SAE gross (same as Dodge's 383 Magnum) as the standard engine. Options included the 340 cu in (5.6 L), 290 hp (220 kW) AAR "Six Barrel", with triple 2-barrel carburetors, a 440 cu in (7.2 L) four-barrel 375 hp (280 kW) Super Commando, the 440 Six Barrel with triple 2-barrel carburetors with a gross rating of 390 hp (290 kW), and the 425 hp (317 kW) 426 cu in (7.0 L) Hemi. The 440- and Hemi-equipped cars received upgraded suspension components and structural reinforcements to help transfer the power to the road.

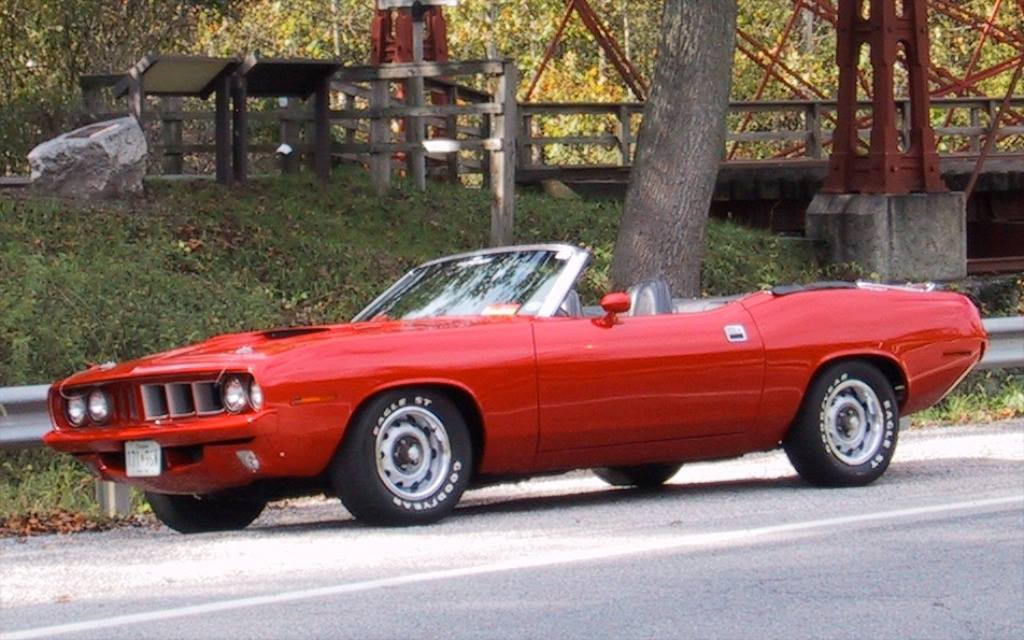
FE5 Red 1971 Plymouth Barracuda convertible

Other Barracuda options included decal sets, hood modifications, and some unusual "high impact" colors such as "Lime Light", "Bahama Yellow", "Tor Red", "Lemon Twist", "Curious Yellow", "Vitamin C", "In-Violet", "Sassy Grass" and "Moulin Rouge".

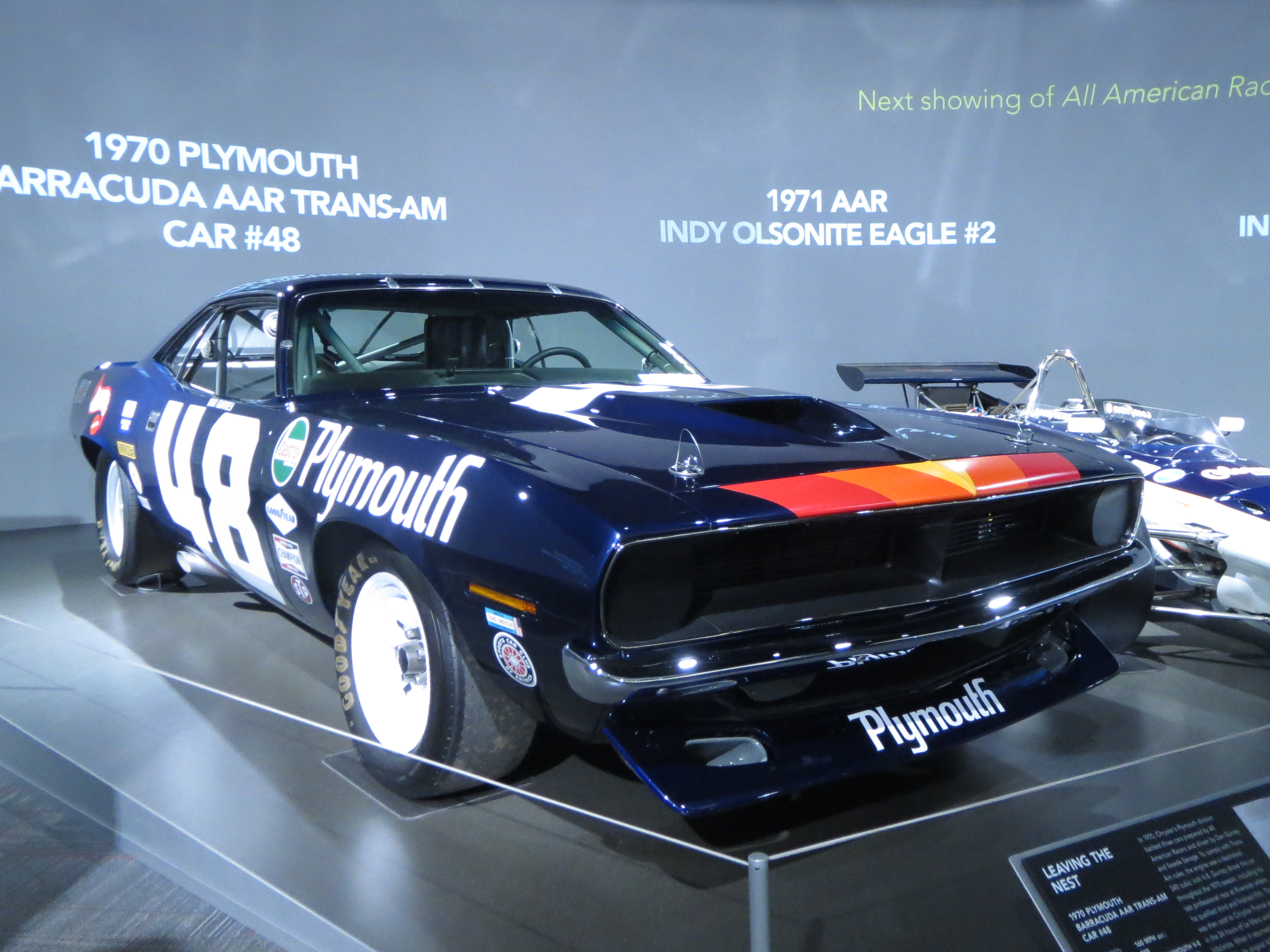
1970 Trans-Am Series AAR 'Cuda

Swede Savage and Dan Gurney raced identical factory-sponsored AAR (All American Racers) 'Cudas in the 1970 Trans-Am Series. The cars qualified for three pole positions but did not win any Trans-Am races; the highest finish was second at Road America. Four 1970 Hemi 'Cudas were also successfully raced by Chrysler France, from 1970 until 1973. The works team director Henrí Chemin piloted the first car, and then sold it on to friend and privateer J. F. Mas who went on to race it for another two years. This Hemi 'Cuda won four French Group 1 class championships, three on track and one in hill climbing.

The Barracuda was changed slightly for 1971, with a new grille and taillights, seat, and trim differences. This would be the only year that the Barracuda would have four headlights (which the Challenger had for all five years of their concurrent run), and also the only year of the fender "gills" on the 'Cuda model. Only 1970 'Cuda models received a "hockey stick" stripe with an engine call out within it, where as 1971 'Cudas were the only year that had the full side "Billboard" decal with the engine call out inside of the billboard decal.

The 1971 Barracuda engine options would remain the same as that of the 1970 model, except that the 340 6-Bbl was gone, and the four-barrel carbureted 440 V8 engine was no longer on the options list, but could be had via special order and perhaps a dozen cars were built with it installed; otherwise, the 440-powered Barracudas had a six-barrel carburetor setup instead.

In 1971 the big-block power options offered to the customer were:

1. 275 hp (205 kW) SAE Gross in the 383-2V
2. 300 hp (224 kW) SAE Gross in the 383-4V
3. 385 hp (287 kW) SAE Gross in the 440-6V
4. 425 hp (317 kW) SAE Gross in the 426-8V

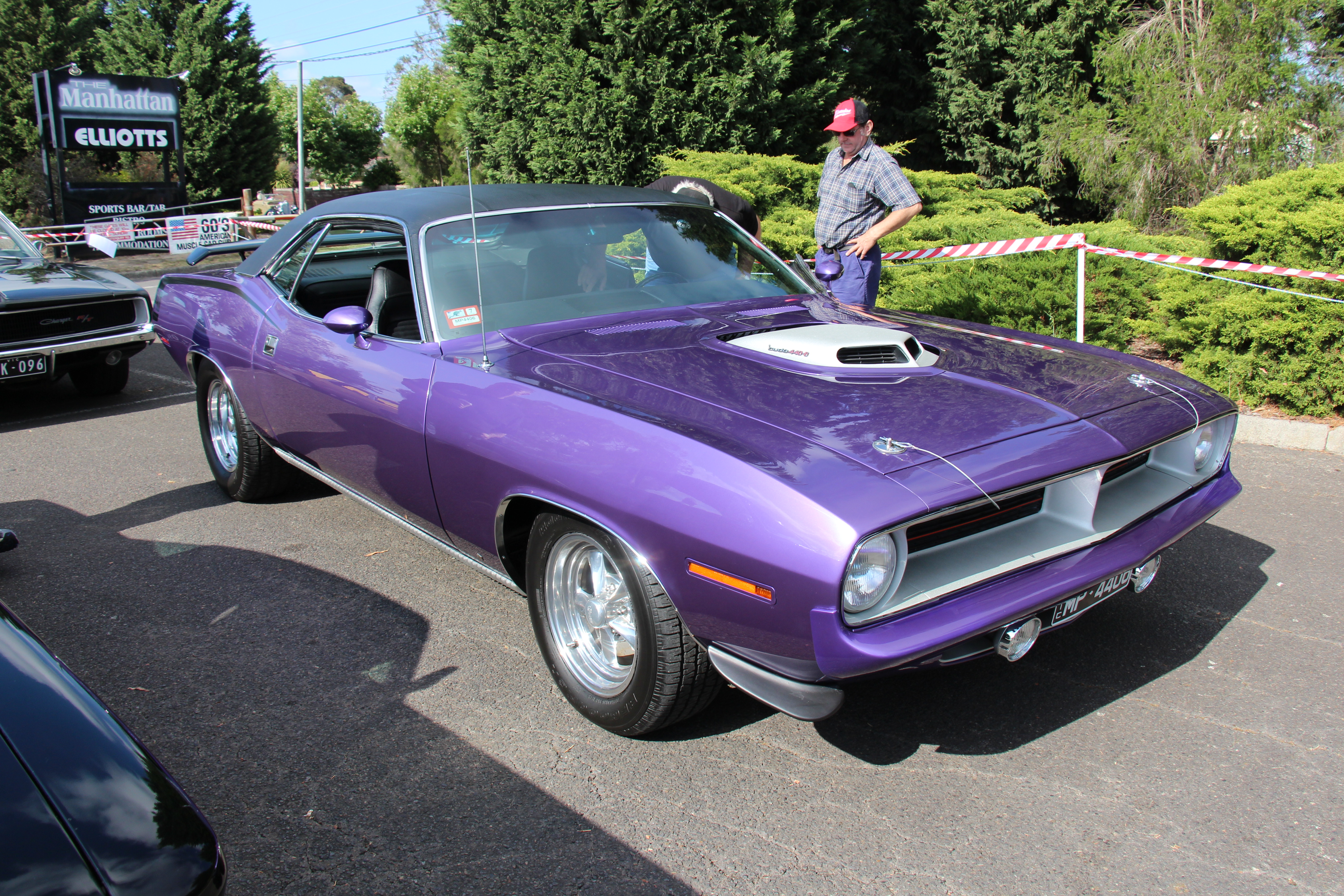
1970 Plymouth 'Cuda 440+6 with optional shaker hood

In 1970 and 1971 only, the shaker hood (option code N96), elastomeric (rubber) colored bumpers, and the Spicer-built Dana 60 rear axle were available. The shaker hood was available with 340, 383, 440 four-barrel, 440 six-barrel, and 426 Hemi engines. The elastomeric (rubber) colored bumpers were available either as a front-only option, option code A21, or as a front and rear combination, option code A22. The heavy-duty (and heavy) Dana 60, with a 9.75 in (248 mm) ring gear, was standard equipment with manual transmissions and 440 six-barrel and 426 Hemi engines, and was optional on those with the automatic transmission. 1971 Barracudas with floor shifted transmissions received a new column key release, where as 1970 models had a backdrive linkage for key removal.

=== 1972–1974 ===
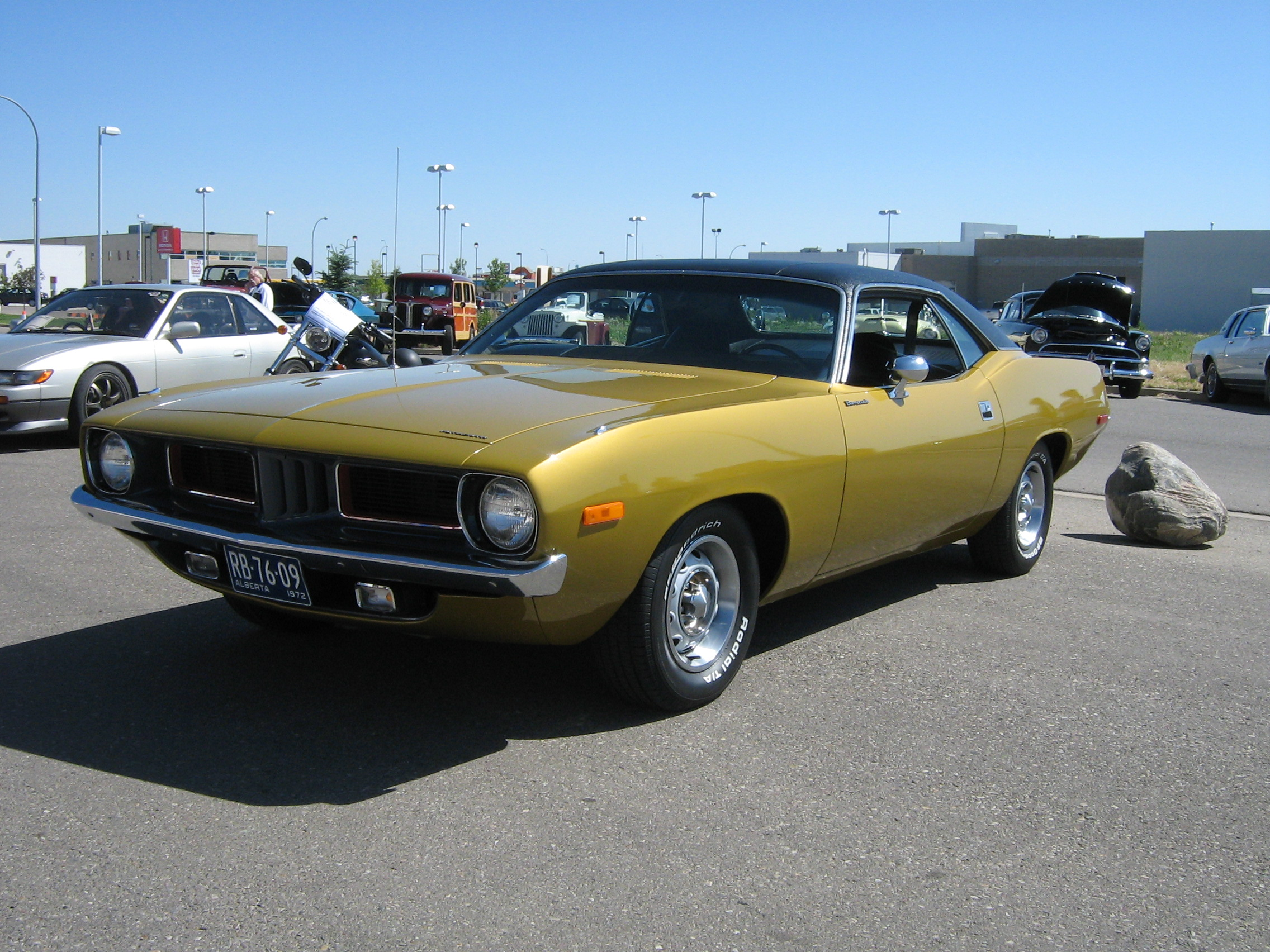
1972 Plymouth Barracuda

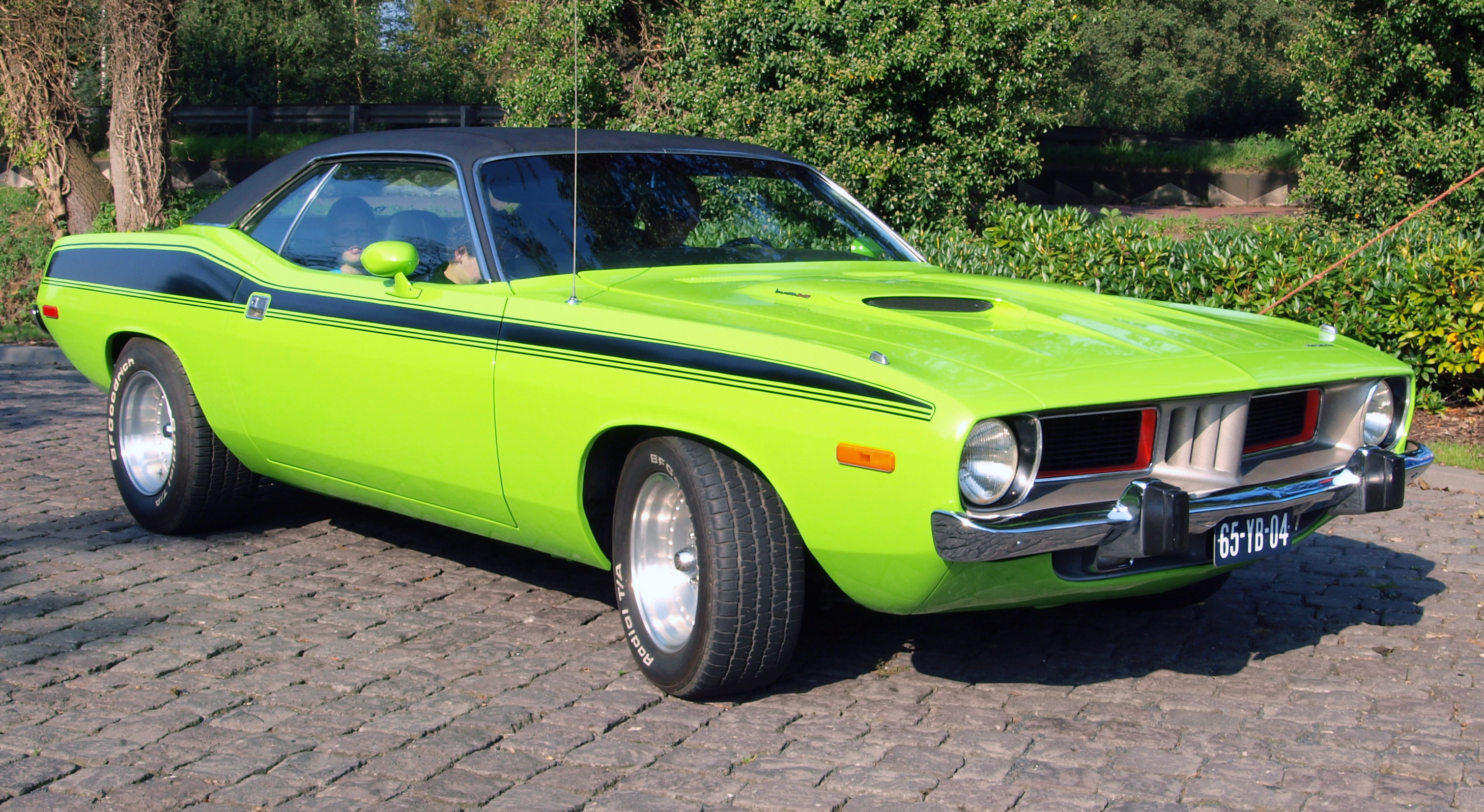
1973 Plymouth Barracuda

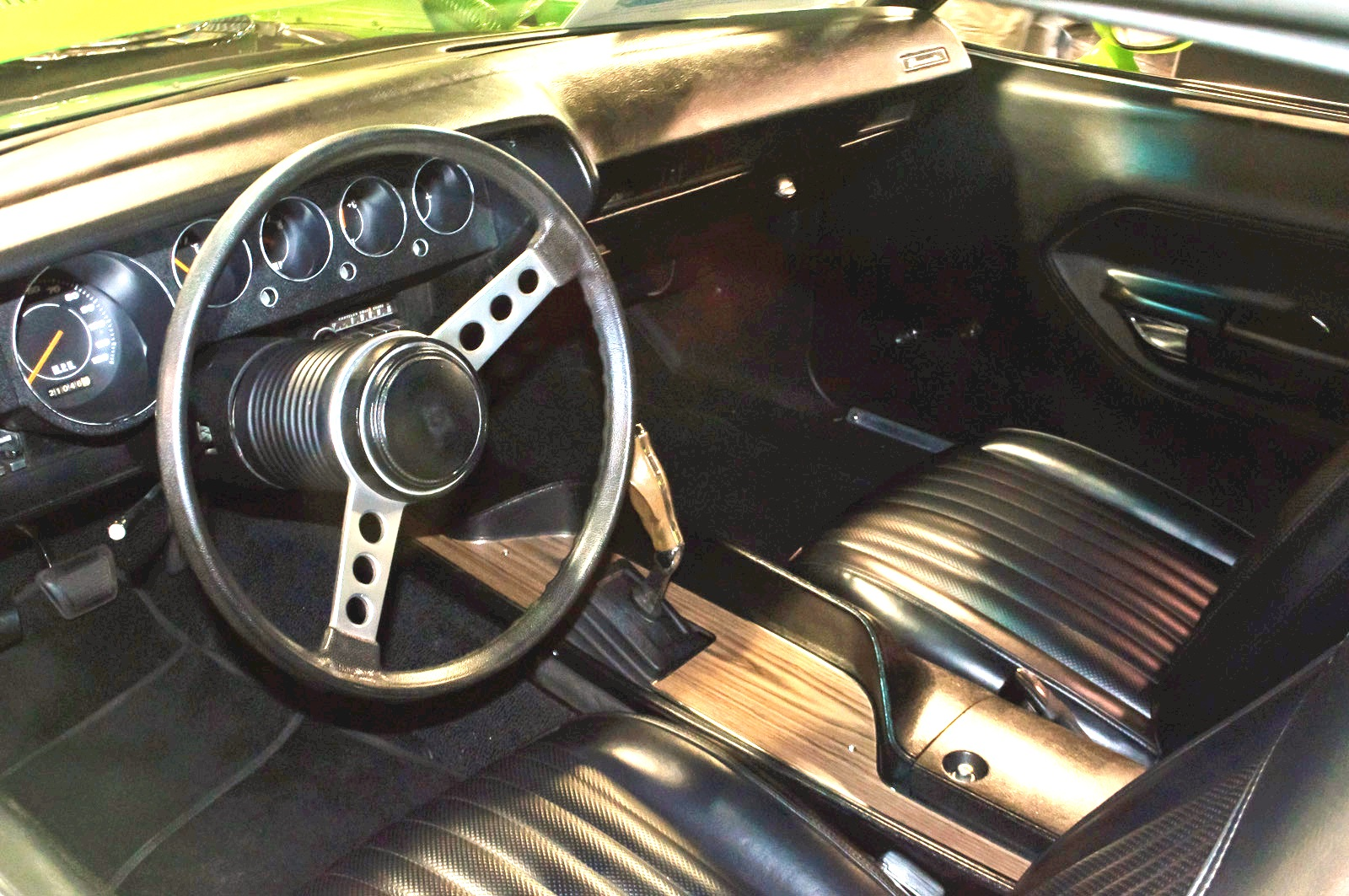
1973 Plymouth Barracuda interior

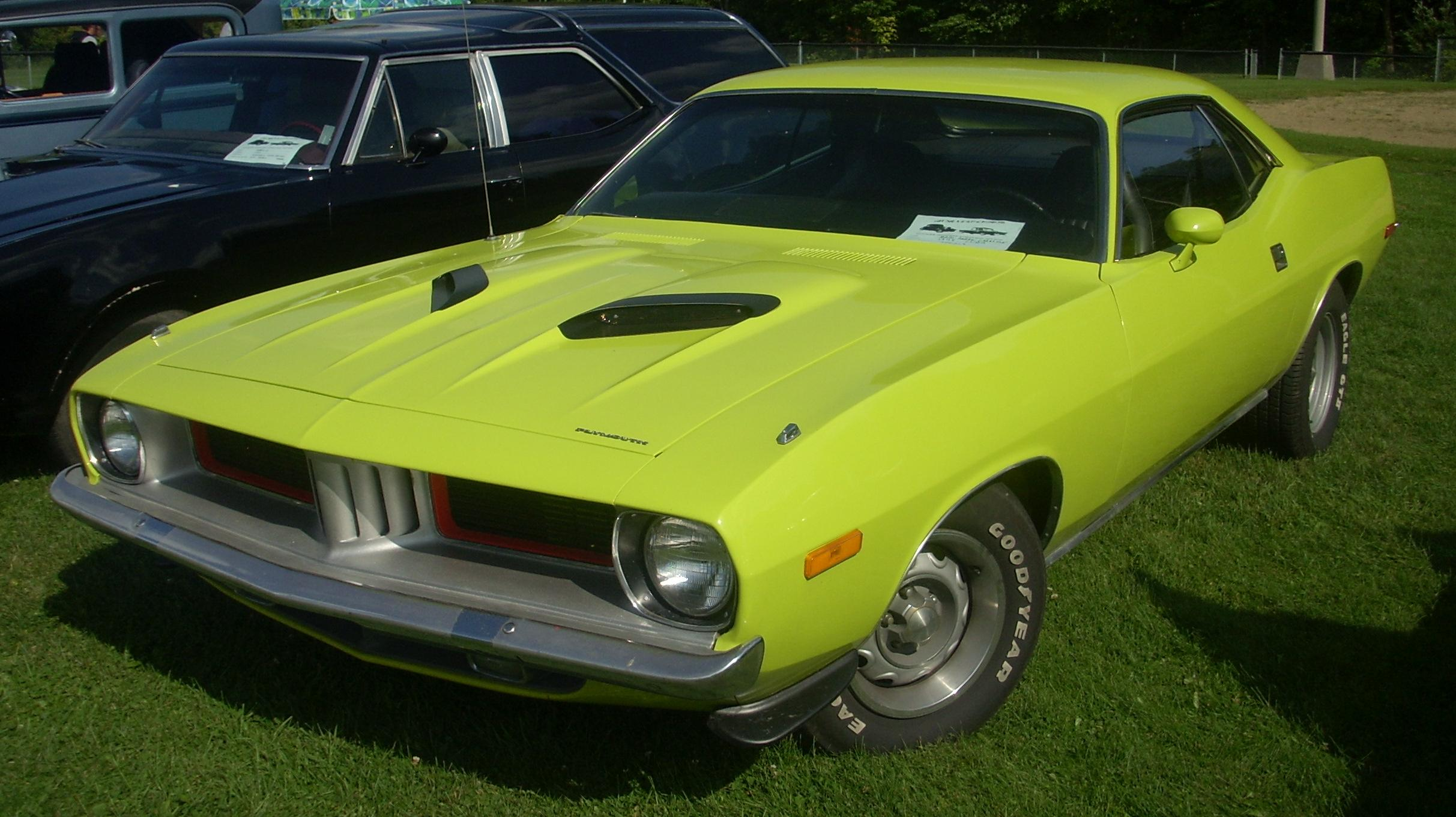
1974 Plymouth 'Cuda

With a new grille and single headlights (very similar to the 1970 model) and four circular taillights for 1972, the Barracuda would remain basically unchanged through 1974, with new bodyside stripes, and minor changes to the bumpers to conform with federal impact standards being the only significant variations. In 1973 the shape of the pedals was changed from a trapezoid shape with a fine horizontal pattern that was original to the shape of the 1970, where as 1973 and later had larger rectangle shaped clutch and brake pedals with thicker horizontal grooves that would remain similar to most all Chrysler products through the 1980s. There was also a corresponding gas pedal that matched the aforementioned brake and clutch style variations. With this change of pedal shape the brake and clutch supporting members were forged differently, and the pads were not interchangeable. 1972 was also the last year for the basket-weave pattern in the seats, where as the next two years, seats had a different cost saving coachman grain pattern vinyl with different bucket seat backs.

Big block engines (383, 440, & 426 Hemi), heavy-duty suspensions, Dana 60 rear axle, large/wide tires mounted on 15 in × 7 in (380 mm × 180 mm) wheels were no longer offered.

Additionally; the convertible model was dropped; though a few late build 1971 convertibles were built with 1972 grills and back end panels and provided to Paramount Studios for TV and movie work; being seen on Mannix, The Brady Bunch and other shows.

Convenience and comfort items such as power seats, power windows, and upgraded interior (leather seats and plush carpeting) options were dropped, though heavy-duty air conditioning and a sunroof could still be ordered.

For 1972 only, three engine choices were offered: a 225 six, the 318 (base engine for both 'Cuda and Barracuda), and a revised 340 detuned to meet emission standards. In addition, all three were tuned to run on low/no-lead gas and were power rated on the NET (installed) method. Three transmissions were offered: a 3-speed manual, the Torqueflite automatic, and the Hurst shifter equipped four-speed.

For 1973 federally mandated safety bumpers were added front and rear, and the 225 six was dropped, with the 318 and 340 V8s being the only engine choices. For late production 1973 cars, and for 1974 a slightly more powerful 360 V8 (245 E bodyhp) replaced the 340. Since 1970; optional was a four-speed manual transmission (equipped with a Hurst shifter) mated to a performance ratio (3.55 to 1) rear axle for the 340 and 360 engines, though as many as three cars (in both 1973 and 1974) were built with the 318 engine and Hurst 4-speed through special orders or factory errors.

As with other American vehicles of the time, there was a progressive decrease in the Barracuda's performance. To meet increasingly stringent safety and exhaust emission regulations, big-block engine options were discontinued. The remaining engines were detuned year by year to reduce exhaust emissions, which also reduced their power output. There was also an increase in weight as bumpers became larger and, starting in 1970, E-body doors were equipped with heavy steel side-impact protection beams. Higher fuel prices following the 1973 oil crisis and performance-car insurance surcharges deterred many buyers as the interest in high-performance cars waned. Sales of pony cars were on the decline. Sales had dropped dramatically after 1970, and while 1973 showed a sales uptick, Barracuda production ended April 1, 1974, ten years to the day after it had begun.

=== Engines ===
Engine choices by Chrysler for the 1970-73 Barracuda included the following:

=== Engines ===
| Engine | Years | Power SAE gross | Power SAE net |
|---|---|---|---|
| 198 Inline 6 | 1971 | 125 hp (93 kW) | 105 hp (78 kW) |
| 225 Inline 6 | 1970-1972 | 145 hp (108 kW) | 110 hp (82 kW) |
| 318 V8 | 1972-1974 | | 150 hp (110 kW) |
| 318 V8 | 1970-1971 | 230 hp (170 kW) | 155 hp (116 kW) |
| 340 V8 | 1970-1971 | 275 hp (205 kW) | 235 hp (175 kW) |
| 340 V8 | 1972-1973 | | 240 hp (180 kW) |
| 340 V8 | 1970 | 290 hp (220 kW) | |
| 360 V8 | 1974 | | 245 hp (183 kW) |
| 383 V8 | 1970-1971 | 290 hp (220 kW) | 190 hp (140 kW) |
| 383 V8 | 1971 | 300 hp (220 kW) | 250 hp (190 kW) |
| 383 V8 | 1970 | 330 hp (250 kW) | |
| 383 V8 | 1970 | 335 hp (250 kW) | |
| 426 V8 | 1970-1971 | 425 hp (317 kW) | 350 hp (260 kW) |
| 440 V8 | 1970 | 375 hp (280 kW) | |
| 440 V8 | 1971 | 385 hp (287 kW) | 330 hp (250 kW) |
| 440 V8 | 1970 | 390 hp (290 kW) | |

- B: 198 cu in (3.2 L) Slant 6 I6: 1970–71 125 bhp (93 kW) SAE gross, 1972 100 bhp (75 kW) SAE net
- C: 225 cu in (3.7 L) Slant 6 I6: 1970–71 145 bhp (108 kW) SAE gross, 1971-72 110 bhp (82 kW) SAE net
- G: 318 cu in (5.2 L) LA V8 (2-barrel carburetor, single exhaust): 1970-71 230 bhp (172 kW) SAE gross, 1971 155 bhp (116 kW) SAE net, 1972-74 150 bhp (112 kW) SAE net
- H: 340 cu in (5.6 L) LA V8 (4-barrel carburetor, dual exhaust): 1970-71 275 bhp (205 kW) SAE gross, 1971 235 bhp (175 kW) SAE net, 1972-73 240 bhp (179 kW) SAE net
- J: 340 cu in (5.6 L) LA V8 (3×2-barrel carburetor): 1970 290 bhp (216 kW) SAE gross, used in AAR Cuda
- L: 360 cu in (5.9 L) LA V8 (4-barrel carburetor, dual exhaust): 1974 245 bhp (183 kW) SAE net
- L: 383 cu in (6.3 L) B V8 (2-barrel carburetor, single exhaust): 1970 290 bhp (216 kW) SAE gross, 1971 275 bhp (205 kW) SAE gross, 1971 190 bhp (142 kW) SAE net
- N: 383 cu in (6.3 L) B V8 (4-barrel carburetor, dual exhaust): 1970 330 bhp (246 kW) SAE gross
- N: 383 cu in (6.3 L) B V8 Magnum (4-barrel carburetor, dual exhaust): 1970 335 bhp (340 PS; 250 kW) at 5,000 rpm SAE gross and 425 lb⋅ft (576 N⋅m) at 3,200 rpm of torque, 1971 300 bhp (224 kW) SAE gross, 1971 250 bhp (186 kW) SAE net
- U: 440 cu in (7.2 L) RB V8 Magnum 4-barrel Holley AVS-4737S carburetor: 1970 375 bhp (380 PS; 280 kW) at 4,600 rpm and 480 lb⋅ft (651 N⋅m) at 3,200 rpm of torque SAE gross, (1971 370 bhp (276 kW) SAE gross, 305 bhp (227 kW) SAE net only in Satellite GTX and Plymouth Sport Fury GT)
- V: 440 cu in (7.2 L) RB V8 Six-Pack 3X2-barrel Holley R-4382A/R-4375A/R-4383A carburetors: 1970 390 bhp (395 PS; 291 kW) at 4,700 rpm and 490 lb⋅ft (664 N⋅m) at 3,200 rpm of torque SAE gross, 1971 385 bhp (390 PS; 287 kW) SAE gross, 1971 330 bhp (335 PS; 246 kW) SAE net
- R: 426 cu in (7.0 L) Hemi V8 2X4-barrel Carter AFB 4742S/AFB4745S carburetors: 1970-71 425 bhp (431 PS; 317 kW) SAE gross at 5,000 rpm and 490 lbf⋅ft (664 N⋅m) at 4,000 rpm of torque, 1971 Costing an extra US$1,228 ($10,000 today) with very few sold.

SAE gross hp ratings were tested with no accessories, no air cleaner, or open headers. In 1971, compression ratios were reduced in performance engines, except the 426 cu in and the high-performance 440 cu in, to accommodate regular gasoline. 1971 was the last year for the 426 Hemi.

Chrysler had plans to continue the 1970 Dodge Challenger T/A for 1971, even publishing advertisements for a 1971 Dodge Challenger T/A. However, no 1971 Dodge Challenger T/A was made. Similarly, no 1971 Plymouth AAR Cuda was made.

=== Production numbers ===
| Year | Engine | Transmission | Production | Total |
|---|---|---|---|---|
| 1970 | I6 | 3-Speed | 1,892 | 48,867 |
| 1970 | I6 | Auto | 3,695 | 48,867 |
| 1970 | V8 | 3-Speed | 4,031 | 48,867 |
| 1970 | V8 | 4-Speed | 9,026 | 48,867 |
| 1970 | V8 | Auto | 30,223 | 48,867 |
| 1971 | I6 | 3-Speed | 411 | 16,492 |
| 1971 | I6 | Auto | 1,318 | 16,492 |
| 1971 | V8 | 3-Speed | 240 | 16,492 |
| 1971 | V8 | 4-Speed | 1,983 | 16,492 |
| 1971 | V8 | Auto | 11,815 | 16,492 |
| 1972 | I6 | Manual | 224 | 18,490 |
| 1972 | I6 | Auto | 596 | 18,490 |
| 1972 | V8 | Manual | N/A | 18,490 |
| 1972 | V8 | Auto | 11,025 | 18,490 |
| 1973 | V8 | Manual | N/A | 19,281 |
| 1973 | V8 | Auto | N/A | 19,281 |
| 1974 | V8 | Manual | N/A | 11,734 |
| 1974 | V8 | Auto | N/A | 11,734 |

== Discontinuation ==
The Barracuda was discontinued after 1974, a victim of the 1973 energy crisis.

A 1975 Barracuda had been planned before the end of the 1970-74 model cycle. Plymouth engineers sculpted two separate concepts out of clay, both featuring a Superbird-inspired aerodynamic body, and eventually reached a consensus upon which an operational concept car could be built. Due to a rapidly changing automotive market due to the energy crisis, the concepts were scrapped and the Barracuda was not put into production for 1975.

=== Revival attempts ===
In 2007, Motor Trend magazine reported a rumor that Chrysler was considering reviving the Barracuda in 2009. A new Barracuda would've been badged as a Chrysler, due to the Plymouth brand having been phased out in 2001. However, the Barracuda has not been reintroduced alongside the third generation Dodge Challenger. Rumors of the Barracuda making a comeback were brought up again by Motor Trend in 2012 when reports leaked that the Barracuda would come back in 2014 under the SRT Marque, replacing the Challenger instead of being built alongside it. It was also stated the car would not be of a retro design. Ultimately, the SRT division was re-consolidated under the Dodge banner and the Challenger remained in production without a Barracuda replacement.

After years of silence, an all-new Barracuda, now under the Dodge brand, was shown to FCA dealers along with other future vehicles on August 25, 2015. Based on stretched underpinnings of the rear-drive Alfa Romeo Giulia, it was rumored to be powered by a turbocharged V6 and arrive within the 2019 model year. As of 2025, a new Barracuda model has not materialized, however, Dodge filed trademarks to secure the "Barracuda" and "'Cuda" nameplates.

== Collectibility ==
The Barracuda (particularly the 1970–1974 E-Body cars) is a collectible car today, with high-performance versions and convertibles commanding the highest prices. The small number of Barracudas remaining in existence is the result of low buyer interest (and low production/sales) when the vehicles were new. The remaining cars of any condition are rare, and the outstanding examples fetch high appraisal values today. Original Hemi super stock Barracudas (and similarly configured Dodge Darts) are now prized collector vehicles, with factory (unaltered) cars commanding high prices.

The 1971 Hemi 'Cuda convertible is now considered one of the most valuable collectible muscle cars. Only thirteen were built, seven of which were sold domestically. The most recent public sale was at the June 2014 Mecum auction in Seattle, where a blue-on-blue 4-speed sold for US$3.5 million (plus buyers premium). Several replica cars were created to look like Hemi 'Cudas and driven by the title character in the late-1990s police procedural Nash Bridges. None of these replica cars had a Hemi V8 under the hood.
