= Dodge Copperhead =

1997 concept vehicle

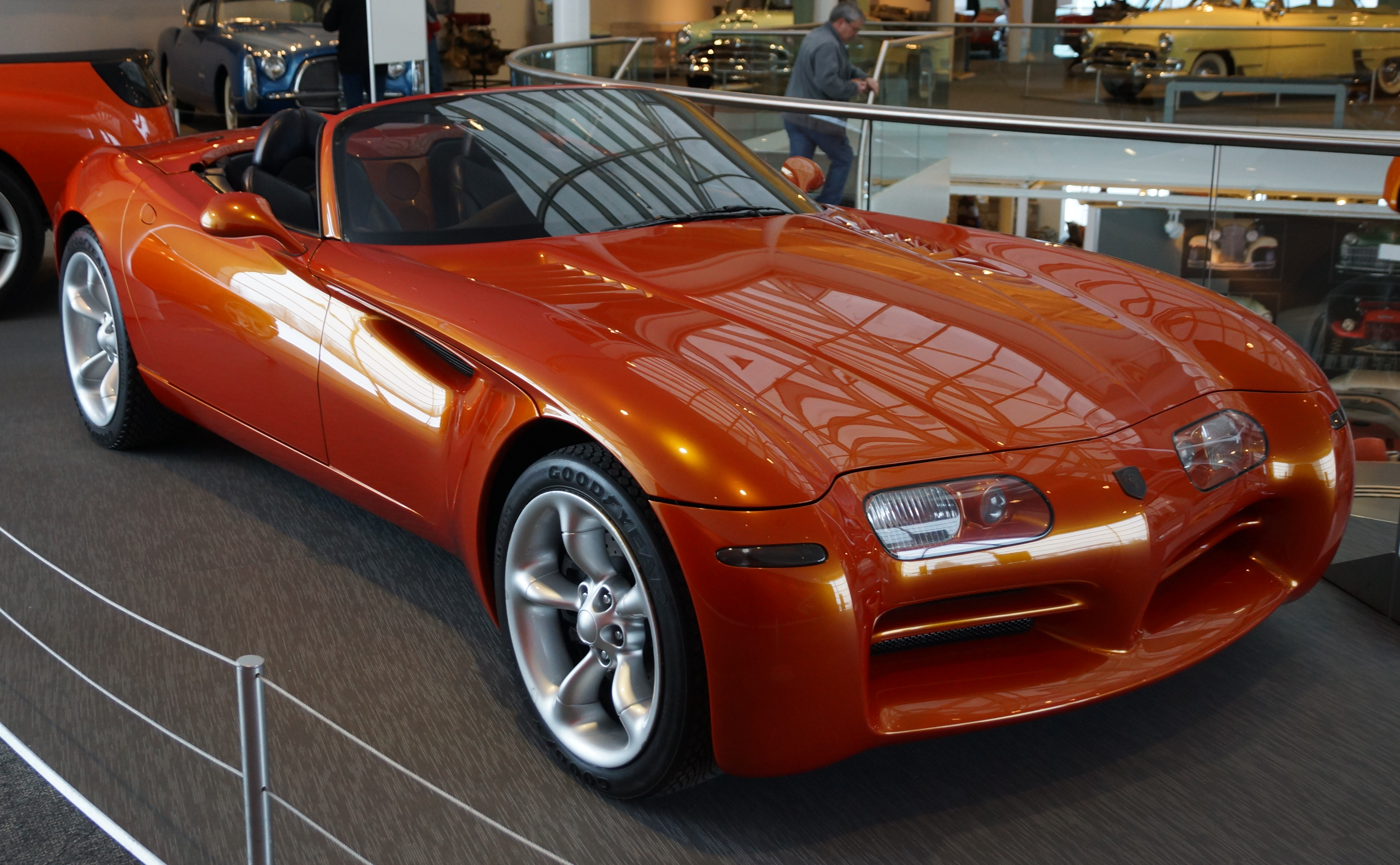
- Dodge Copperhead at the Walter P. Chrysler Museum (now closed)

Overview
- Manufacturer: Chrysler Corporation
- Also called: Dodge Concept Car; Dodge Concept Vehicle
- Production: 1997 (1 built as prototype)
- Designer: John Herlitz

Body and chassis
- Class: Sports car (S)
- Body style: 2-door roadster
- Layout: FR layout
- Platform: Dodge Viper

Powertrain
- Engine: 2.7 L LH DOHC V6
- Power output: 220 hp (164 kW; 223 PS); 188 lb⋅ft (255 N⋅m)
- Transmission: 5-speed manual

Dimensions
- Wheelbase: 2,794 mm (110.0 in)
- Length: 4,242 mm (167.0 in)
- Width: 1,829 mm (72.0 in)
- Height: 1,262 mm (49.7 in)
- Curb weight: 1,295 kg (2,855 lb)

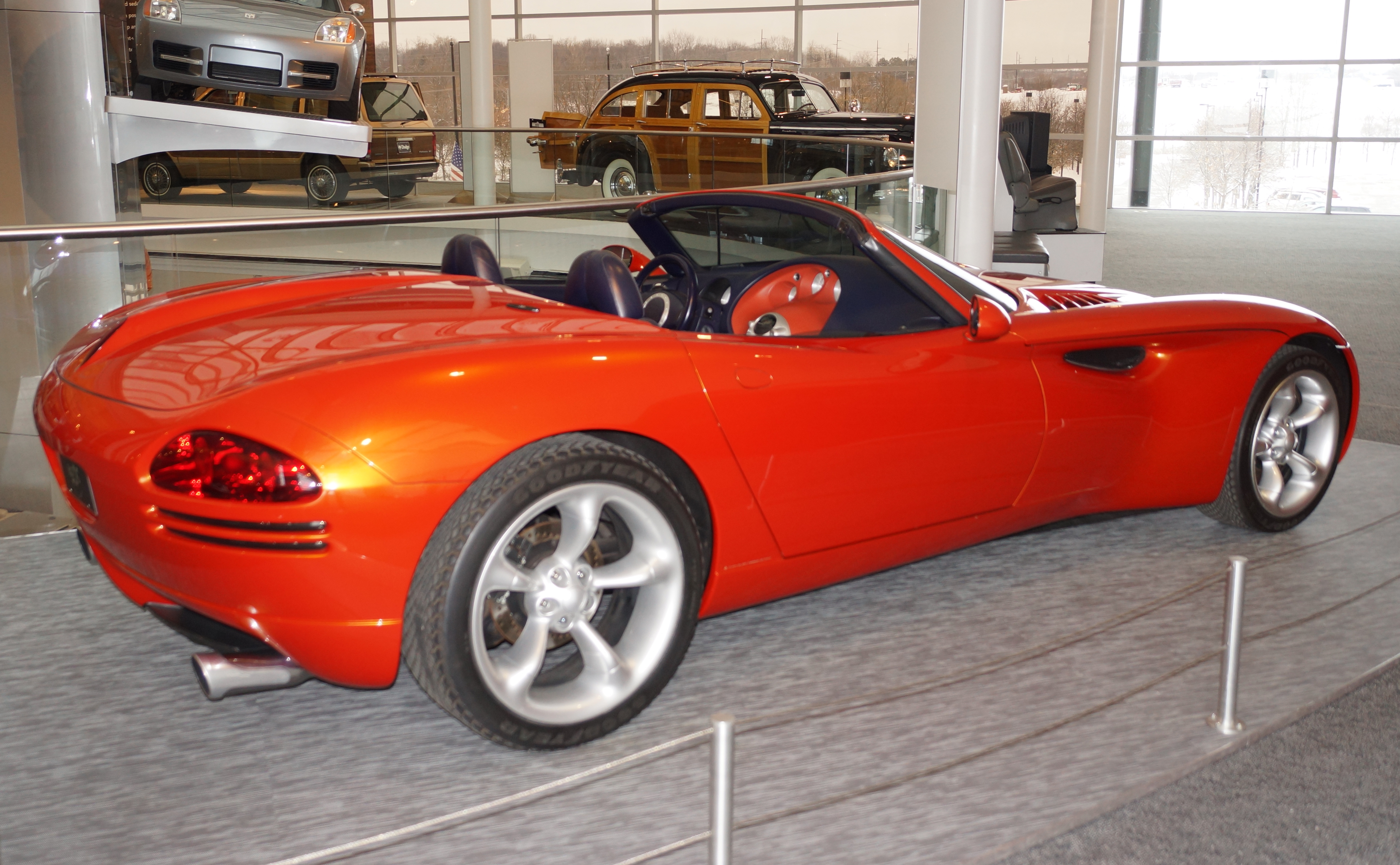
Rear ¾ view

The Dodge Copperhead, later unofficially renamed as Dodge Concept Car or Dodge Concept Vehicle, is a concept car created by Dodge as a slimmed-down version of the Dodge Viper for buyers who could not afford the Viper's $75,000 cost.

== Overview ==
The Copperhead was unveiled at the 1997 North American International Auto Show in Detroit. Some reviewers were impressed with its aerodynamic, yet rugged styling with its Copper Fire Orange color and the fact that its sale price would be about US$30,000 (US$45,000 less than the Viper). The Copperhead, unlike the Viper, was made more for handling and driving pleasure, while the Viper was made more for raw power. Dodge engineered the Copperhead to make the driver feel the road and the pavement, which was done by stretching the wheels to the end of the frame, adding five inches of ground clearance and a stiff suspension, making this car marketed more towards enthusiasts. The Copperhead was due to be released in 2000, but was canceled.

== Design ==
The exterior and interior designs of the Copperhead are both completely distinct compared to its original influence and platform, the Viper, but the Copperhead still contains some designs from it.

=== Exterior ===
An all-new bodykit made specifically for the Copperhead takes over most of the Viper's design to distinguish it. This new body forces some parts from its original platform to be changed (either in shape or position) or be removed. Even with the stuffy-looking design, the Copperhead is still slightly shorter than the Viper, except for the wheelbase, which is a foot (300 mm; 12 in) longer than it.

The Copperhead's new look includes larger wheel fenders, a larger front bumper, a slightly smaller front grille, headlights positioned below the hood, side inlet pits (rather than the regular side performance inlets), removed front air intake, smaller hood louvers, a stubby top rear fin, smaller Viper taillights, and front wheels that have been slightly moved forward for better handling.

=== Interior ===
The dashboard tachometer has been changed entirely, now with an old-school design. Four gauges sit on the middle of the dashboard, displaying the engine oil, speedometer, fuel, and temperature, with the high beam lights and turn signal displays sitting beside them. Below the gauges sits a head-like designed center console control area, and includes climate control, two air conditioning fans, temperature display, radio FM display, and other functions. Below the controls sits the 5-speed manual transmission, and the handbrake. The whole center console design resembles a copperhead snake. The steering wheel design remains the same design used for the Phase ZB series Vipers.

== Specifications ==
The Copperhead is powered by a 2.7 L (160 cu in) LH all-aluminum DOHC V6 engine manufactured by Chrysler that is placed at a front longitudinal position. The engine puts out 220 hp (164 kW; 223 PS) at 6000 rpm and 188 lb⋅ft (255 N⋅m) at 4900 rpm. Power is sent to the rear wheels by a 5-speed close-ratio manual transmission. The chassis is heavily based on the Dodge Viper, but has been extensively modified to suit the Copperhead's requirements. Its tires, which are 225/40R18 up front, and 255/40R18 at the rear, help to keep the handling precise thanks to its wide width and sticky footprint. The suspension is composed of double wishbones with coil over dampers. These are also short-and-long-arm versions to better increase comfort and better handling.

== Name controversy ==
After the unveiling of the Copperhead, Dodge received a complaint regarding ownership of the rights to the "Copperhead" name. A customized 1950 Ford Coupe owned by Billy Gibbons of the American rock band ZZ Top had already been registered with the Kopperhead name. As a result, DaimlerChrysler unofficially renamed the car, with it being referred to as the "Concept Vehicle" instead of "Copperhead" in press kits, scale toys, and other merchandise. This made press kits or items with the Copperhead name collectibles.

== In media ==
After the Copperhead name controversy the car was named as "Concept Car" in video games. The Dodge Copperhead appears as a playable vehicle in Gran Turismo, Gran Turismo 2 and Test Drive 6.
