= John Samsen =

American car designer (1927–2020)

John R. 'Dick' Samsen (November 29, 1927 – November 6, 2020) was an aero engineer turned product designer; Ford designer 1952–1955, co-designer of 1955 Ford Thunderbird and Chrysler designer 1955–1976.

Most notable for his work on the 1955 Thunderbird and the Plymouth Barracuda models, Samsen published a documentary DVD "We Dreamed the Dream Cars", a history of American car designing. Aerospace engineer, industrial designer, and artist, John Samsen's thirty-five-year career included design work on the first Thunderbird and two experimental cars at Ford, and the co-design of Barracuda, Fury, Road Runner, Imperial, Duster, and many other projects at Chrysler Corp.

Besides doing free-lance and consultant work for several other corporations, Samsen used his skills to produce acrylic and watercolor paintings and digital fine art. His work has received awards in shows and many pieces are in private collections. In 1978, John experienced a metanoia, a transformation of consciousness, and wrote the book Gems Among the Stones, the story of his life and awakening. Samsen was married to Mary "Tucky" Samsen, a nursing educator. They resided in Hilton Head, SC.
