= Group GT3 =

Regulation for grand tourer racing cars

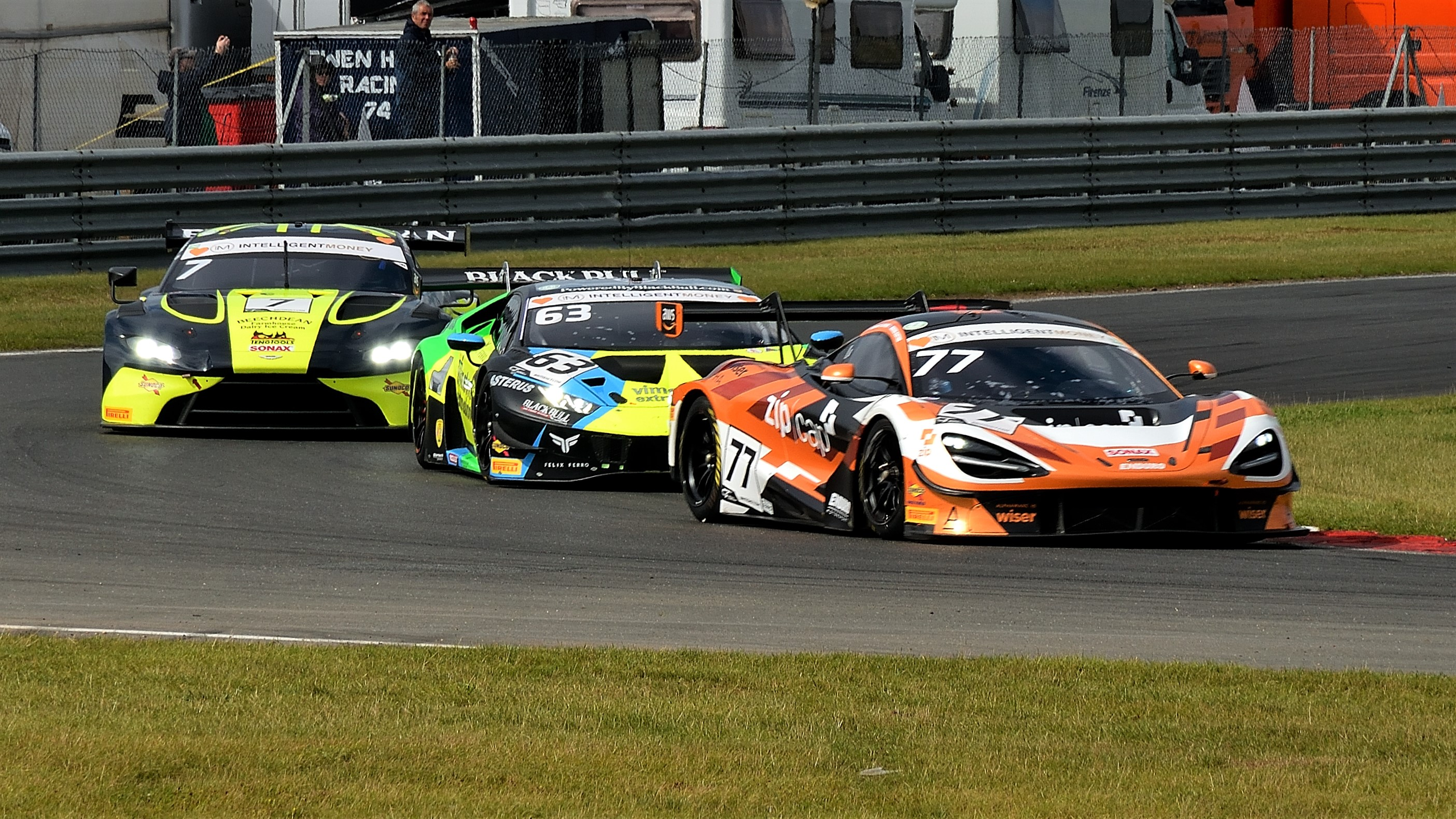
A group of cars at the Snetterton Circuit, featuring three Group GT3 manufacturers

Group GT3, known technically as Cup Grand Touring Cars and commonly referred to as simply GT3, is a set of regulations maintained by the Fédération Internationale de l'Automobile (FIA) for grand tourer racing cars designed for use in various auto racing series throughout the world. The GT3 category was initially created in 2005 by the SRO Motorsports Group as a third rung in the ladder of grand touring motorsport, below the Group GT1 and Group GT2 categories which were utilized in the SRO's FIA GT Championship, and launched its own series in 2006 called the FIA GT3 European Championship. Since then, Group GT3 has expanded to become the de facto category for many national and international grand touring series, although some series modify the ruleset from the FIA standard. By 2013, nearly 20 automobile manufacturers have built or been represented with GT3 machines.

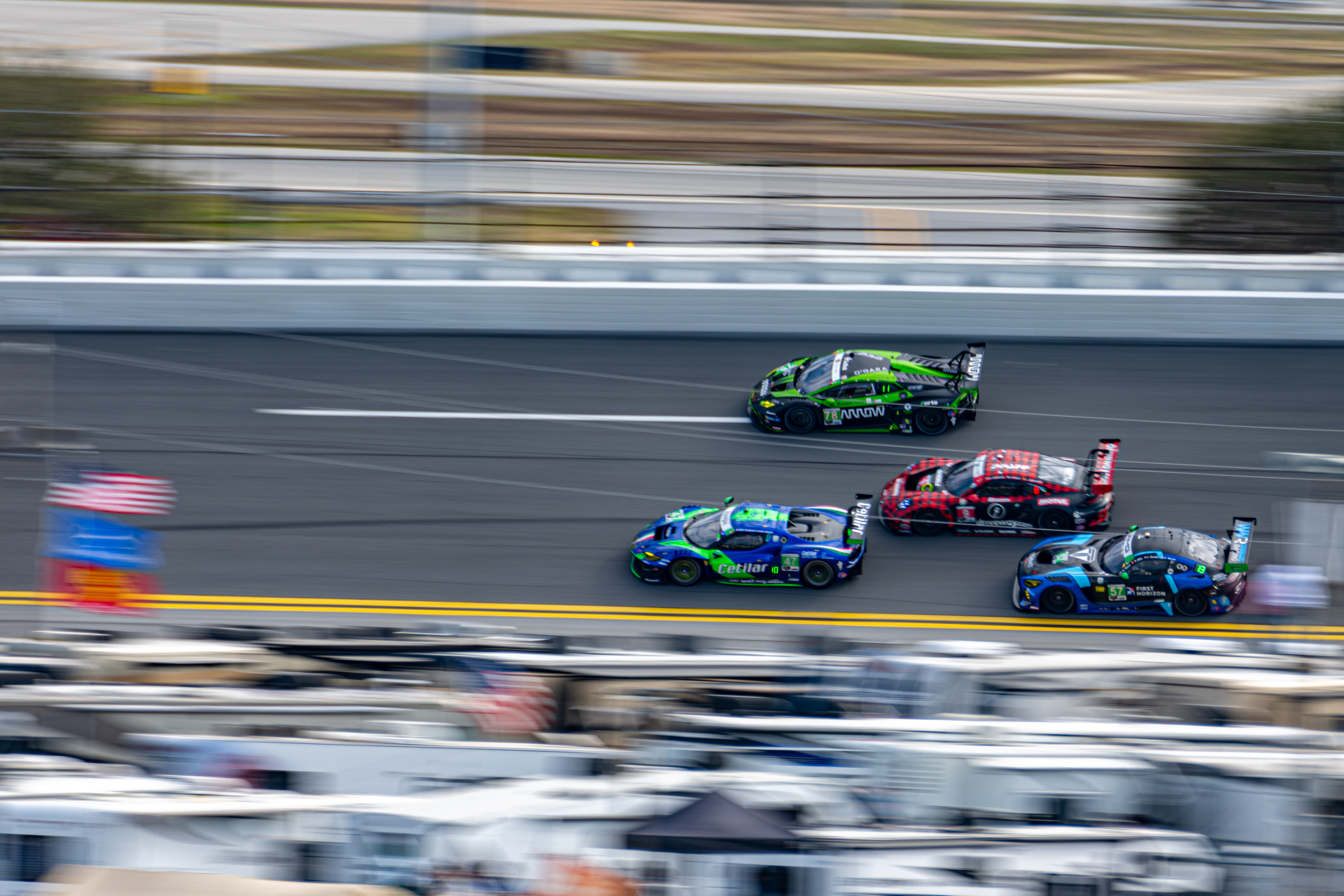
A group of cars on the banks of the Daytona International Speedway during the 2023 24 Hours of Daytona, featuring several Group GT3 manufacturers

GT3 cars must be based on mass production road car models that are being built and sold at the time of homologation, which does not necessarily include the engine (e.g. the BMW Z4 GT3 used the 4.0L V8 from the BMW M3 E92, while the Mercedes-AMG GT3 the 6.2 V8 from the Mercedes SLS AMG GT3). Apart from that, Group GT3 allows for a wide variety of car types to be homologated with almost no limit on engine sizes and configurations or chassis construction or layout. Performance of all the Group GT3 cars are regulated, either by the GT Bureau of the FIA or by a series' specific ruling body, through the balance of performance formulae that adjusts limits on horsepower, weight, engine management, and aerodynamics to prevent a single manufacturer from becoming dominant in the class. The cars in GT3 are designed to have a weight between 1,200 and 1,300 kilograms (2,646 and 2,866 lb) with horsepower between 500 and 600 horsepower (507 and 608 PS; 373 and 447 kW). All cars have a very similar power to weight ratio but achieved either by high power and high weight such as the Mercedes-Benz SLS AMG or low power and low weight such as the Porsche 911 GT3. GT3 cars also have traction control, ABS, and built-in air jacks for quick pit stops.

== History ==
The concept behind Group GT3 was introduced by Stéphane Ratel, head of the SRO Group and promoter of the FIA GT Championship in 2005. The Group GT1 and Group GT2 cars in the FIA GT Championship required manufacturers to build a car based on regulations, and then develop that car to increase its performance, thus increasing the cost for the manufacturers and the customers wanting to race the cars. GT3 was envisioned as a category that would simplify the process by combining several existing cars from one-make series, such as the Porsche Supercup or Ferrari Challenge, as well as other race cars available from manufacturers that did not fit in GT1 or GT2, such as the Aston Martin DBRS9 or Dodge Viper Competition Coupe, and allow them to all compete on a level playing field through strict control of their performance by the FIA. This would allow drivers a bridge between smaller national series and the professional international FIA GT Championship. Further, the category was conceived to use sprint formats for races, but manufacturers could develop and sell an upgrade kit for their cars to allow GT3 cars to be used in endurance races. A similar category, under the same name, had been used in the British GT Championship which the SRO Group also organized.

The regulations and homologations for Group GT3 were prepared by the FIA and ready by the start of the 2006 season, with eight manufacturers represented as the first Balance of Performance test prior to the debut of the FIA GT3 European Championship. The International GT Open, British GT Championship, Spanish GT Championship, and Italian GT Championship all created a category specifically for the FIA's new Group GT3 machines. The SRO Group expanded the category in 2007 with the launch of two new regional championships, the Brazilian GT Championship and the German ADAC GT Masters, exclusively running Group GT3 cars. The British GT Championship abandoned Group GT2 cars, promoting GT3 to their premiere category, while the Belcar series reorganized their class structure to introduce GT3 as their lead class. The French FFSA GT Championship also added a new GT3 category.

The Australian GT Championship brought on board the GT3 category in 2008 while the VLN Series and 24 Hours Nürburgring added GT3 categories in 2009. By 2011, Group GT3 was expanding into endurance racing with the formation of the Blancpain Endurance Series as well as winning overall at the Bathurst 12 Hour, Dubai 24 Hour, Malaysia Merdeka Endurance Race, and Spa 24 Hours, followed by a 24 Hours Nürburgring victory in 2012. Group GT3 also expanded to the United States with the Rolex Sports Car Series, allowing several GT3 cars with specification wings, as well as the Japanese Super GT and Super Taikyu Series, while Nissan became the first Japanese manufacturer to sell a GT3 car. GT3 category cars also replaced Group GT1 cars in the FIA GT1 World Championship before rebranding as the FIA GT Series in 2013. After NASCAR merged their Grand-Am Rolex Sports Car Series with IMSA's American Le Mans Series, the new United SportsCar Championship allowed more types of GT3 cars to join the GTD category, and in 2016 limited the category to only GT3 spec machines.

On 9 March 2018, it was announced that the FIA World Motor Sport Council approved the introduction of a new process, in which a minimum production number required for GT3 race cars would be enforced. Ten units must be made within twelve months from the homologation date, twenty units must be made within twenty-four months and so on. Following dwindling manufacturer support for their Class One regulations, the Deutsche Tourenwagen Masters (DTM) series switched to the GT3 formula in 2021, abandoning its touring car origins. In 2022, the FIA confirmed that the GTE cars in the FIA World Endurance Championship would be replaced by GT3 cars, racing in the LMGT3 class. This means GT3 cars will be able to participate in the 24 Hours of Le Mans from 2024 onward.

Ratel has expressed concern over the category's rising costs as of 2026, believing that the trend of producing sports cars built with the intent to race in Group GT3 would kill the class altogether, and has suggested that GT3 should "go back to the fundamentals".

== Homologated cars ==
As of April 2026, 59 vehicles have gone through the homologation process with the FIA, although some of these homologations failed to be completed or were later revoked. Homologations expire after a period of seven years unless a request for extension is made by the manufacturer. Currently, all homologations prior to GT3-030 have expired and not been renewed, although these expired cars are allowed to compete in national series under local approval (such as SCCA Trans-Am Series XGT classes) or in historic events such as Le Mans Classic. One such championship, the GT3 Revival Series, uses cars homologated between 2006 to 2009 and between 2010 to 2013, which are each classified as "Gen I" and "Gen II", respectively.

Group GT3 cars can be built either directly by the automotive manufacturer or built by racing teams and tuning companies at the behest of the manufacturer. Other vehicles have been allowed to run alongside Group GT3 cars in various series under homologations from national ruling bodies, including the Mosler MT900R GT3, Ginetta G55 GT3, Chevron GR8 GT3, Radical RXC GT3, Scuderia Cameron Glickenhaus SCG 003C, Emil Frey's Jaguar XKR G3, Acura TLX-GT, Renault Sport R.S. 01 GT3, Aston Martin Vulcan AMR Pro, Chevrolet Corvette C8.R GTD, and JAS Motorsport's Honda NSX GT3 Evo25. As of January 2026, 19 vehicles currently hold valid homologation for use in competition by the Fédération Internationale de l'Automobile.

Homologation #	Manufacturer	Model	Developer	Photo	Start date	End date	Notes
GT3-001	Maserati	Coupe GranSport Light	Italtecnica		1 October 2006	31 December 2019	
GT3-002	Dodge	Viper Competition Coupe	Oreca		1 October 2006	31 December 2019	
GT3-003	Aston Martin	DBRS9	Prodrive		1 November 2006	31 December 2019	
GT3-004	Lamborghini	Gallardo LP520 GT3	Reiter Engineering		1 November 2006	31 December 2019	
GT3-005	Corvette	Z06.R GT3	Callaway Cars		1 May 2007	31 December 2019	
GT3-006	Ascari	KZ1-R GT3	Ascari		1 March 2007	31 December 2019	
GT3-007	Porsche	911 GT3 Cup	Porsche Motorsport		1 April 2007	31 December 2019	997 generation 911 GT3, 2006 model only
GT3-008	Venturi	GT3 Heritage	Venturi		1 December 2008	31 December 2019	
GT3-009	Ferrari	F430 GT3	Kessel Racing		1 March 2007	31 December 2019	
GT3-010	Ford Racing	Mustang FR500C GT	Multimatic Motorsports		1 May 2007	31 December 2019	
GT3-011	Ford	GT GT3	Matech Concepts		Not available	30 April 2008	Homologation rescinded, replaced by GT3-016
GT3-012	Jaguar	XKR GT3	Apex Motorsport		none		Homologation failed
GT3-013	Morgan	Aero 8 GT3	AutoGT Racing		1 September 2007	31 December 2019	
GT3-014	Lotus	Exige GT3	Lotus Sport		1 October 2007	31 December 2019	
GT3-015	Porsche	911 GT3 Cup S	Porsche Motorsport		1 April 2008	31 December 2019	
GT3-016	Ford	GT GT3	Matech Concepts		1 May 2008	31 December 2019	Engine design was changed from GT3-011
GT3-017	Audi	R8 LMS	Audi Sport		1 May 2009	31 December 2019	Includes: R8 LMS ultra
GT3-018	BMW Alpina	B6 GT3	Alpina		1 May 2009	31 December 2019	
GT3-019	Ferrari	430 Scuderia GT3	Kessel Racing		1 May 2009	31 December 2019	
GT3-020	Dodge	Viper Competition Coupe Series 2	Oreca		1 May 2009	31 December 2019	
GT3-021	Jaguar	XKR-S GT3	Apex Motorsport		none		Homologation failed
GT3-022	Morgan	Aero Super Sport GT3	AutoGT Racing		1 May 2009	31 December 2019	
GT3-023	BMW	Z4 GT3	BMW Motorsport		1 May 2010	31 December 2019	
GT3-024	Lamborghini	Gallardo LP600+ GT3	Reiter Engineering		1 May 2010	31 December 2019	Includes: Gallardo FL2 GT3; Gallardo R-EX
GT3-025	Porsche	911 GT3 R	Porsche Motorsport		1 May 2010	31 December 2024	997 generation 911 GT3
GT3-026	Corvette	Callaway Z06.R GT3	Callaway Cars		1 May 2010	31 December 2019	
GT3-027	Ford	Mustang VDS GT3	Marc VDS Racing Team		none		Homologation failed
GT3-028	Mercedes-AMG	SLS AMG GT3	Mercedes-AMG		1 May 2011	31 December 2019	
GT3-029	Ferrari	458 Italia GT3	Ferrari Competizioni GT		1 May 2011	31 December 2024	
GT3-030	Nissan	GT-R Nismo GT3	Nismo		1 April 2012	31 December 2026	
GT3-031	McLaren	MP4-12C GT3	McLaren GT		1 April 2012	31 December 2019	
GT3-032	Aston Martin	V12 Vantage GT3	Prodrive		1 May 2012	31 December 2019	
GT3-033	Chevrolet	Camaro GT3	Sareni		4 April 2012	31 December 2019	
GT3-034	Maserati	GranTurismo MC GT3	Swiss Team		1 November 2013	31 December 2020	
GT3-035	Bentley	Continental GT3	M-Sport		1 April 2014	31 December 2023	Second-generation Continental GT
GT3-036	Dodge	Viper GT3-R	Riley Technologies		1 January 2015	31 December 2022	
GT3-037	McLaren	650S GT3	McLaren GT		1 February 2015	31 December 2022	
GT3-038	Audi	R8 LMS	Audi Sport		1 May 2015	31 December 2031	Second generation R8: Includes: R8 LMS Evo; R8 LMS Evo II
GT3-039	Cadillac	ATS-V.R GT3	Pratt & Miller		1 August 2015	31 December 2022	
GT3-040	Lamborghini	Huracán GT3	Lamborghini Squadra Corse		1 December 2015	31 December 2023	Includes: Huracán GT3 Evo
GT3-041	Porsche	911 GT3 R	Porsche Motorsport		1 March 2016	31 December 2025	991 generation 911 GT3
GT3-042	Mercedes-AMG	GT3	Mercedes-AMG		1 March 2016	31 December 2029	Includes: GT3 Evo
GT3-043	BMW	M6 GT3	BMW Motorsport		1 March 2016	31 December 2023	
GT3-044	Ferrari	488 GT3	Ferrari Competizioni GT		1 March 2016	31 December 2028	Includes: 488 GT3 Evo 2020
GT3-045	Corvette	Callaway Corvette C7 GT3-R	Callaway Cars		1 June 2016	31 December 2026	
GT3-046	Toyota	Lexus RC F GT3	Toyota Gazoo Racing		1 January 2017	31 December 2032	
GT3-047	Honda	Acura NSX GT3	JAS Motorsport		1 March 2017	31 December 2029	Includes: NSX GT3 Evo; NSX GT3 Evo22
GT3-048	Nissan	GT-R Nismo GT3	Nismo		1 April 2018	31 December 2032	Second-generation GT-R
GT3-049	Bentley	Continental GT3	M-Sport		1 April 2018	31 December 2031	Third-generation Continental GT
GT3-050	Porsche	911 GT3 R	Porsche Motorsport		1 February 2019	31 December 2028	991.2 generation 911 GT3
GT3-051	Aston Martin	Vantage AMR GT3	Prodrive		1 March 2019	31 December 2031	Second-generation Vantage: Includes: Vantage AMR GT3 Evo
GT3-052	McLaren	720S GT3	McLaren Motorsport		1 April 2019	31 December 2030	Includes: 720S GT3 Evo
GT3-053	BMW	M4 GT3	BMW Motorsport		1 January 2022	31 December 2032	Includes: M4 GT3 Evo
GT3-054	Lamborghini	Huracán GT3 Evo 2	Lamborghini Squadra Corse		1 December 2022	31 December 2029	
GT3-055	Porsche	911 GT3 R	Porsche Motorsport		1 December 2022	31 December 2032	992 generation 911 GT3: Includes: 911 GT3 R Evo
GT3-056	Ferrari	296 GT3	Ferrari Competizioni GT		1 January 2023	31 December 2032	Includes: 296 GT3 Evo
GT3-057	Chevrolet	Corvette Z06 GT3.R	Pratt & Miller		1 December 2023	31 December 2030	
GT3-058	Ford	Mustang GT3	Multimatic Motorsports		1 March 2024	31 December 2033	7th Generation Mustang: Includes: Mustang GT3 Evo
GT3-059	Lamborghini	Temerario GT3	Lamborghini Squadra Corse		1 March 2026	31 December 2033	

== Use in series ==
Since 2006, Group GT3 cars have been either exclusive to or in a distinct class in each of the following series listed.

=== As premier class ===
- ADAC GT Masters
- Deutsche Tourenwagen Masters
- FIA GT World Cup
- GT3 Legends(gen 1 only)
- GT Revival Series (older GT3 models only)
- GT World Challenge America
- GT World Challenge Australia
- GT World Challenge Asia
- GT World Challenge Europe
- GT World Challenge Europe Endurance Cup
- GT World Challenge Europe Sprint Cup
- Intercontinental GT Challenge
- International GT Open
- Italian GT Championship

=== As subsidiary class ===
- 24H Series
- 24H Series Middle East
- Apex One
- Asian Le Mans Cup
- Asian Le Mans Series
- Austrian GT
- Baltic Touring Car Championship
- Belcar
- Britcar
- British GT Championship
- Campeonato de España de GT
- Campeonato Nacional de Velocidade
- CEZ Circuit Endurance
- China Endurance Championship
- China GT Championship
- Danish Endurance Championship
- DMV Super Touring & GT Cup
- Endurance Brasil
- European Le Mans Series
- FIA Motorsport Games
- FIA World Endurance Championship (LMGT3)
- Gulf Pro Car
- GT America Series
- GT Challenge de las Américas
- GT Cup Championship
- GT Cup Series
- GT Series Cup Brasil
- GT Summer Series
- GT Winter Series
- IMSA SportsCar Challenge
- IMSA SportsCar Championship (GT Daytona and GT Daytona Pro)
- International GT
- Michelin Le Mans Cup
- National GT Challenge
- Nürburgring Langstrecken Serie
- SRO Japan Cup
- South African Endurance Series
- South Island Endurance Series
- Supercar Challenge
- Super GT
- Super Taikyu Series
- Thailand Super Series
- Trans-Am Series
- Ultimate Cup Series

== See also ==
- Group 5
- Group B
- IMSA GT classes
- Group GT1
- Group N-GT
- Group GT2 (LM GTE)
- SRO GT4
- SRO GT2
