= Dodge Ram SRT-10 =

American sport pickup truck

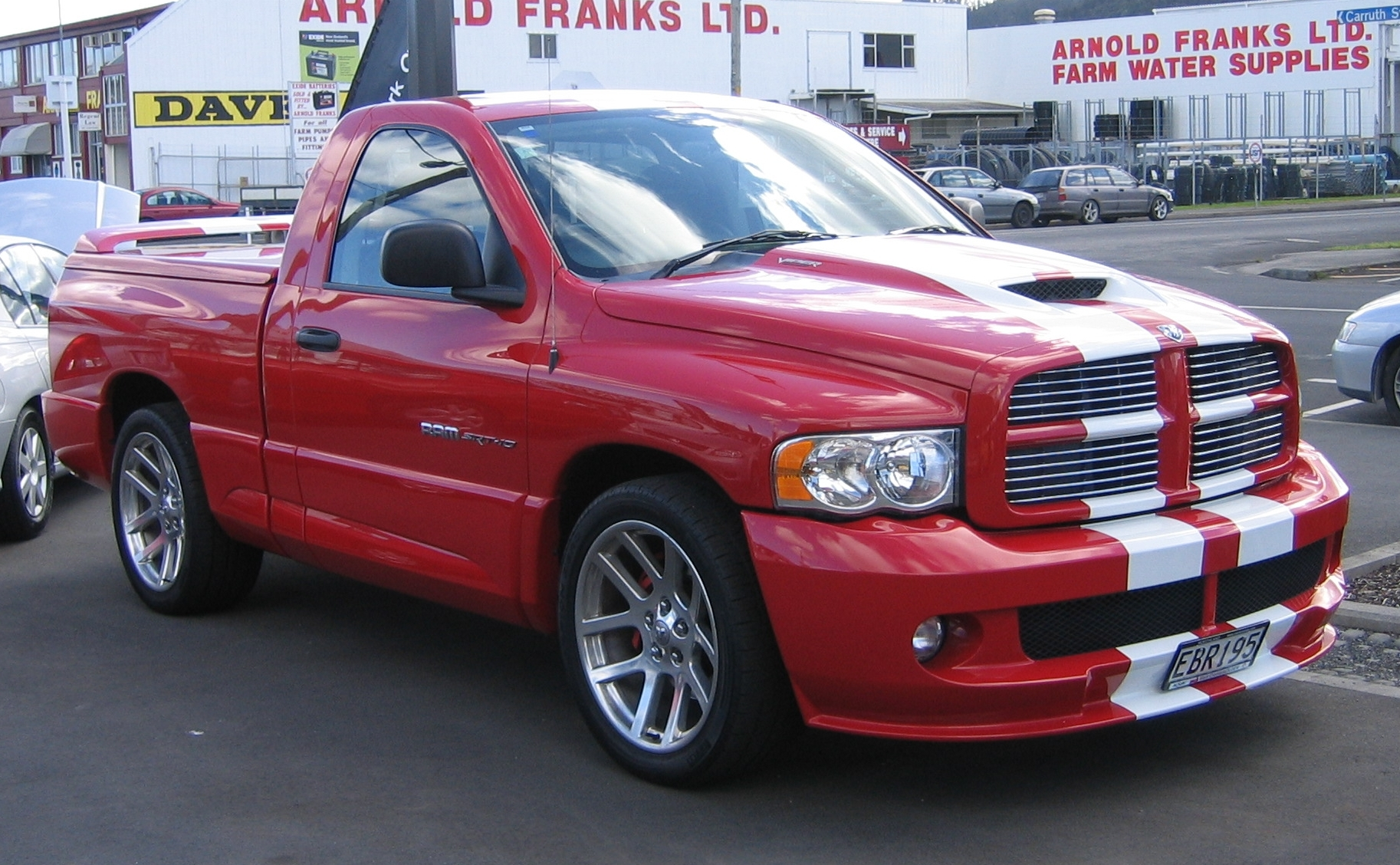

Overview
- Manufacturer: DaimlerChrysler
- Also called: Ram SRT-10 (Europe)
- Production: 2004–2006
- Assembly: Saltillo, Coahuila, Mexico (Saltillo Truck Assembly)

Body and chassis
- Class: Sport full-size pickup truck
- Body style: 2-door regular cab 4-door extended cab ("Quad Cab")
- Layout: FR layout
- Platform: Chrysler DR/DH/D1 platform
- Related: Dodge Ram 1500

Powertrain
- Engine: 8.3 L (505 cid) Viper V10
- Power output: 510 bhp
- Transmission: 6-speed Tremec T-56 manual (regular cab); 4-speed 48RE automatic (quad cab)

Dimensions
- Wheelbase: Regular: 120.5 in (3,061 mm); Quad: 140.5 in (3,569 mm)
- Length: Regular: 203.1 in (5,159 mm); Quad: 227.7 in (5,784 mm)
- Width: 79.9 in (2,029 mm)
- Height: Regular: 74.4 in (1,890 mm); Quad: 74.7 in (1,897 mm)

The Dodge Ram SRT-10 is a sport full-size pickup truck produced by Dodge, based on the standard Ram 1500, with only 10,046 units built. It was introduced as a concept at the January 2002 North American International Auto Show, while the production model was introduced in 2003 as a 2004 model year.

== Development ==
The Dodge Ram SRT was created by DaimlerChrysler’s PVO (Performance Vehicle Operations) division, using Dodge Viper and Plymouth Prowler engineers. Extensive wind tunnel testing was used in styling the exterior of the Ram SRT-10. This is the second time that Dodge has put a Viper engine into a Ram pickup. At the 1996 Chicago Auto Show, Dodge introduced a concept Dodge Ram with a Viper Generation 2 engine, but it was not put into production. The Dodge Ram VTS was painted Banzai Blue with dual white skunk stripes, housed an 8.0 L (488 cid) V10, a six-speed Borg-Warner manual gearbox, and 17 in (432 mm) Viper GTS wheels wrapped in BF Goodrich 275/60-HR17 Comp T/A HR4 tires.

== Overview ==
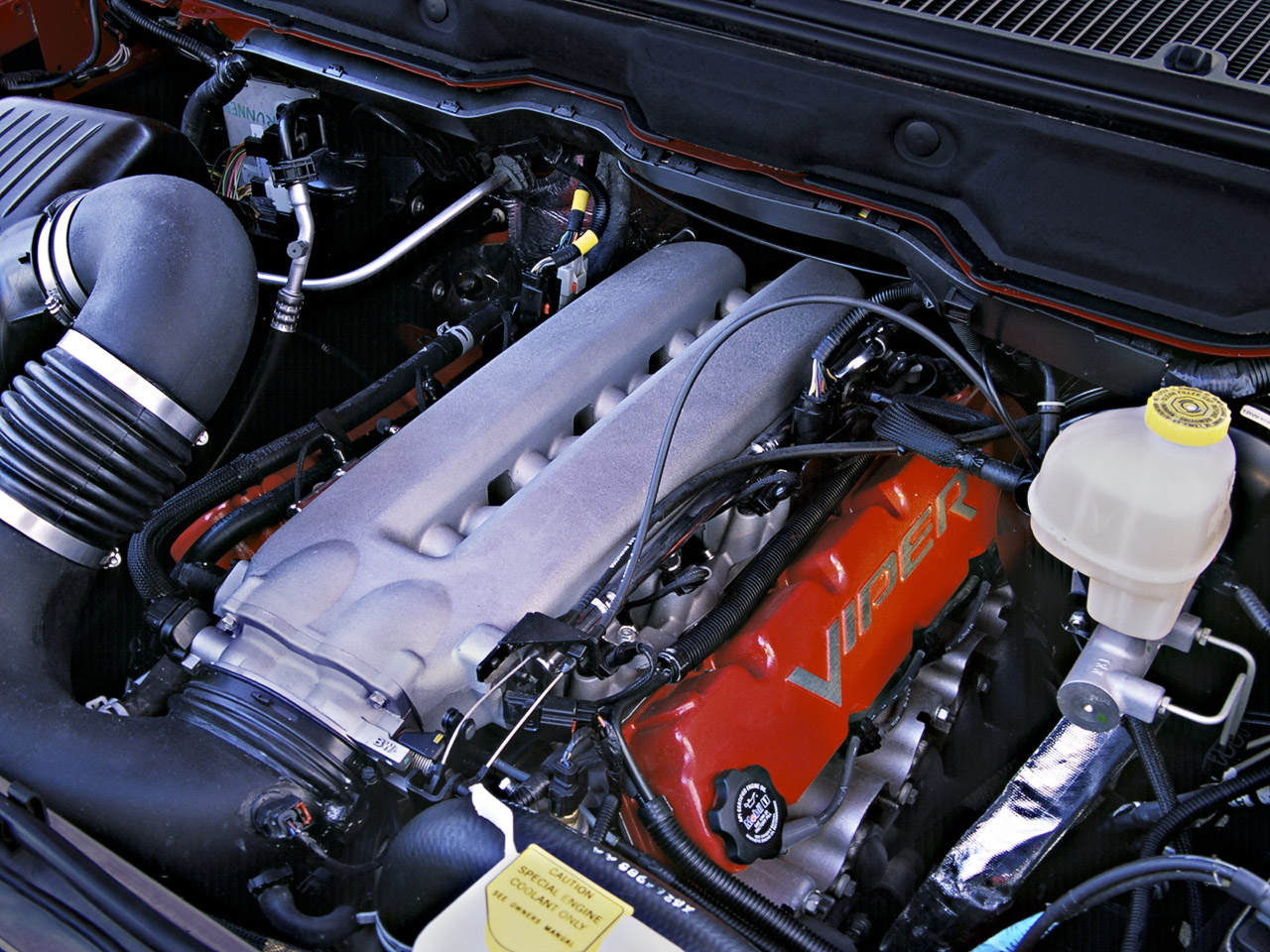
Dodge Ram SRT-10 engine (with aftermarket intake tube)

The SRT-10 featured a Chrysler 8.3 liter V10 that was first used in the third generation Viper. This engine produced 500 bhp (373 kW; 507 PS) at 5,600 rpm and 525 lb⋅ft (712 N⋅m) of torque at 4,200 rpm. The regular cab, with a total curb weight of 5,130 lb (2,327 kg), reached a top speed of 154 mph (248 km/h), and could accelerate from 0 to 60 mph (97 km/h) in 4.9 seconds, whereas the Quad Cab, weighing 5,618 lb (2,548 kg), achieved 0-60 mph (97 km/h) in 5.3 seconds and reached a top speed of 147 mph (237 km/h). The regular cab could complete the 1/4 mi (400 m) in 13.6 seconds at 106 mph (171 km/h), the Quad Cab in 13.7 seconds at 100 mph (161 km/h). The engine produced one horsepower for every 10.3 lbs of vehicle weight in the regular cab. The regular cab generated .86 g of grip on a 300 ft (91 m) skidpad, while the Quad Cab generated .83 g. The regular cab was rated by the EPA at 9 MPG city/15 highway, while the Quad Cab was rated at 9 city/12 MPG highway.

=== Drivetrain ===
The V10 Viper engine delivered 90 percent of its torque from 1500 to 5600 rpm. The cast aluminum cylinder block had cast-iron liners and cross-bolted main caps. The bore and stroke had been increased over previous Viper models. Compression ratio, firing order, rod length, block height and block length were unchanged from the second-generation Viper engine. The regular cab featured a Tremec T-56 transmission, while the Quad Cab used a 48RE four-speed automatic transmission modified from the Ram Heavy Duty transmission. Both regular cab and Quad Cab used a Dana 60 rear axle.

Gear	1	2	3	4	5	6	Final Drive
Ratio	2.66:1	1.78:1	1.30:1	1.00:1	0.74:1	0.50:1	4.10:1 (2004); 4.56:1 (2005–06)

48RE

Gear	1	2	3	4	Final Drive
Ratio	2.45:1	1.45:1	1.00:1	0.69:1	4.56:1

=== Suspension ===
PVO engineers modified the Ram Heavy Duty's rack and pinion steering and independent front suspension for use in the Ram SRT-10. A fully hydroformed Dodge Ram frame was used in conjunction with a custom-tuned suspension, lowering the Ram SRT-10's ride height one inch in the front and 2.5 inches in the rear. Bilstein shock absorbers, performance-tuned springs and unique aerodynamic aids were used to enhance the Ram SRT-10's higher-speed performance. An additional 5th shock was used on the rear axle to prevent wheel hop during wheel-spin.

=== Exterior ===
The Ram SRT-10 had a unique hood that featured a wide power bulge and honeycomb grille hood scoop. The hood scoop allowed cool air to enter as well as forcing hot air to exit from the engine bay, thus helping the engine to run cooler. "Viper Powered" badges were added to the sides of the power bulge, to indicate the SRT-10 engine under the hood. Large chrome SRT-10 logos were mounted to the driver and passenger side doors and rear tailgate right side on the Quad cab and Single Cab 2005 models replaced in 2006 by smaller chrome and red SRT-10 logo badges . All models were outfitted with large molded kickerpanels painted to match body color. Another exterior feature was a tonneau cover with an attached spoiler that was supposed to come standard on the 2005 Quad Cab version and all 2006 models, but due to manufacturing problems was not installed on nearly half of the Ram SRT-10s intended. To help remedy this situation, Dodge added a $1000 credit and a regular spoiler to the Ram SRT-10s that did not receive the tonneau cover. In addition to style, the spoiler also helped with air flow and provided a reduction in lift and drag. The Ram SRT-10 had a bed size of 6 ft 3 in (1.91 m), giving the regular cab an overall length of 17 ft 7 in (5.36 m), and 19 ft 2 in (5.84 m) overall length for the Quad Cab.

=== Interior ===
The Truck audio had 3 options of the Dodge Ram SRT-10 by 2006 and consisted of 8 Infinity brand speakers with a DVD based large color LCD map navigation system and a mid-tier CD turn by turn graphics CD-based system with small color LCD, and finally a standard LED Radio with CD player; all built and designed by Infinity audio and 10 inch woofer mounted in between the seats with silver bezel and 575 watts of total system output, Bluetooth by U-Connect for hands free communication through your car stereo as a factory option also full digital Satellite radio. The doors on both the Standard cab and Quad had silver accents along the middle above the arm rest. It also came with a leather trimmed steering wheel and with heavily bolstered racing-derived suede-trimmed charcoal leather seats. The center stack was adorned with silver trim, and a silver trim strip with the SRT-10 logo resided under the passenger-side air bag cover. Taking a cue from the Dodge Viper, the Ram SRT-10 came with a red start button on the dash. The manual transmission regular cab featured a Hurst shift lever, which sprouted from a silver metal shift bezel and was fitted with a Viper shift knob. Aluminum performance-inspired pedals replaced the stock setup. The gauge cluster featured satin silver-faced gauges and Viper font and graphics. The A-Pillar on Driver's side has an Oil Temperature Gauge, sporting the SRT logo. The speedometer and tachometer were re-calibrated to match the Ram SRT-10's increased performance. Optional sunroof was electric, as was a small electric rear window.

=== Colors ===
Excluding the special editions, the 2004–2005 Ram SRT-10 came in three colors: Black Clear Coat, Bright Silver Metallic Clear Coat, and Flame Red Clear Coat. The redesigned 2006 Ram SRT-10 came in Mineral Gray Metallic, Inferno Red Crystal Pearl Coat, Brilliant Black Crystal Clear Coat, Flame Red Clear Coat and Black Clear Coat.

=== Wheels and brakes ===
The stock 22 in (559 mm) wheels were fitted with Pirelli Scorpion P305/40R-22 performance tires and modeled after the 10-spoke wheels available on the Viper. The brakes for the 2004 model (front and rear) and 2005-06 (rear) were modified from the Ram Heavy Duty truck for use in the Ram SRT-10. The standard ABS-equipped brakes were fitted with 15 in (381 mm) rotors in front and 14 in (356 mm) rotors out back. 2004 models used red-painted two-piston sliding brake calipers front and rear; these were replaced with larger four-piston monoblock calipers up front in 2005–06, designed by TRW and unique to the SRT-10. Two NASCAR-inspired brake cooling ducts integrated into the front fascia provide cooling for the Ram SRT-10's brakes.

== Quad cab ==
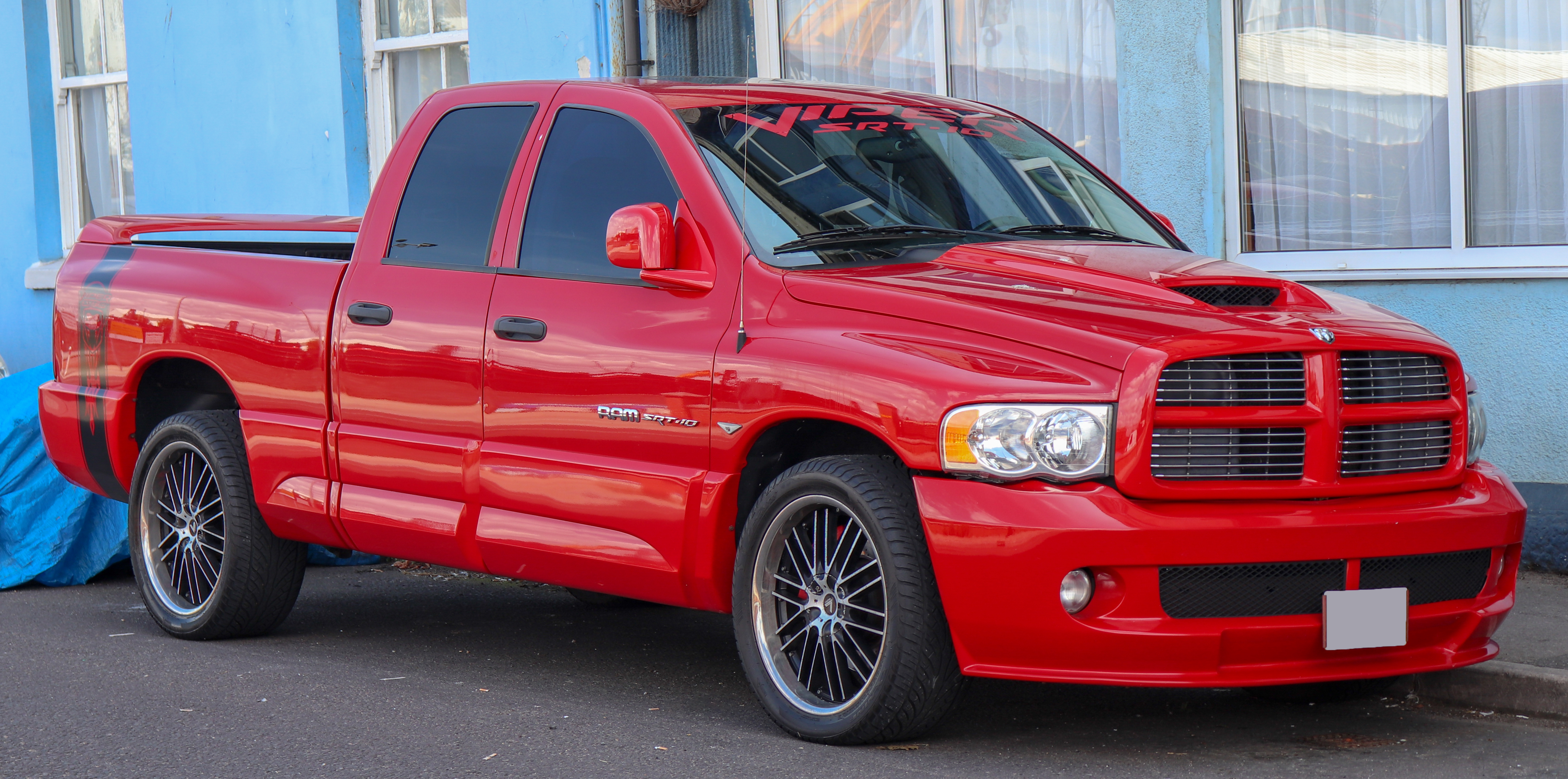
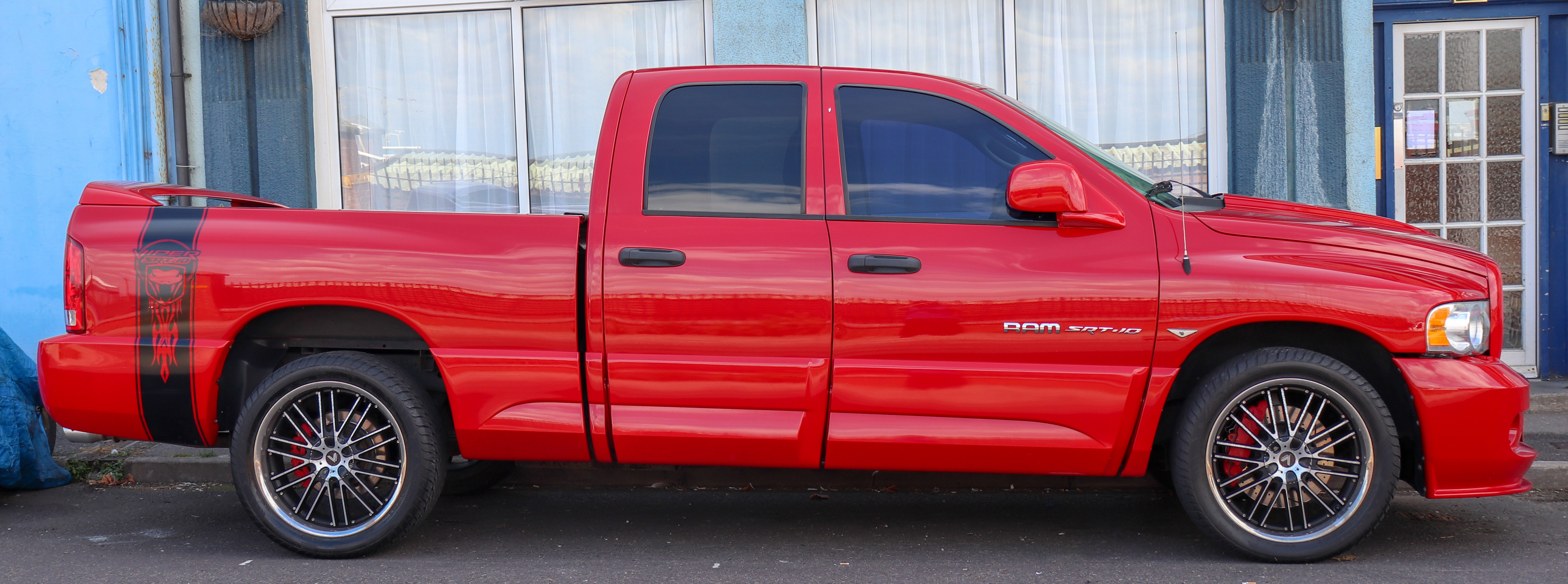

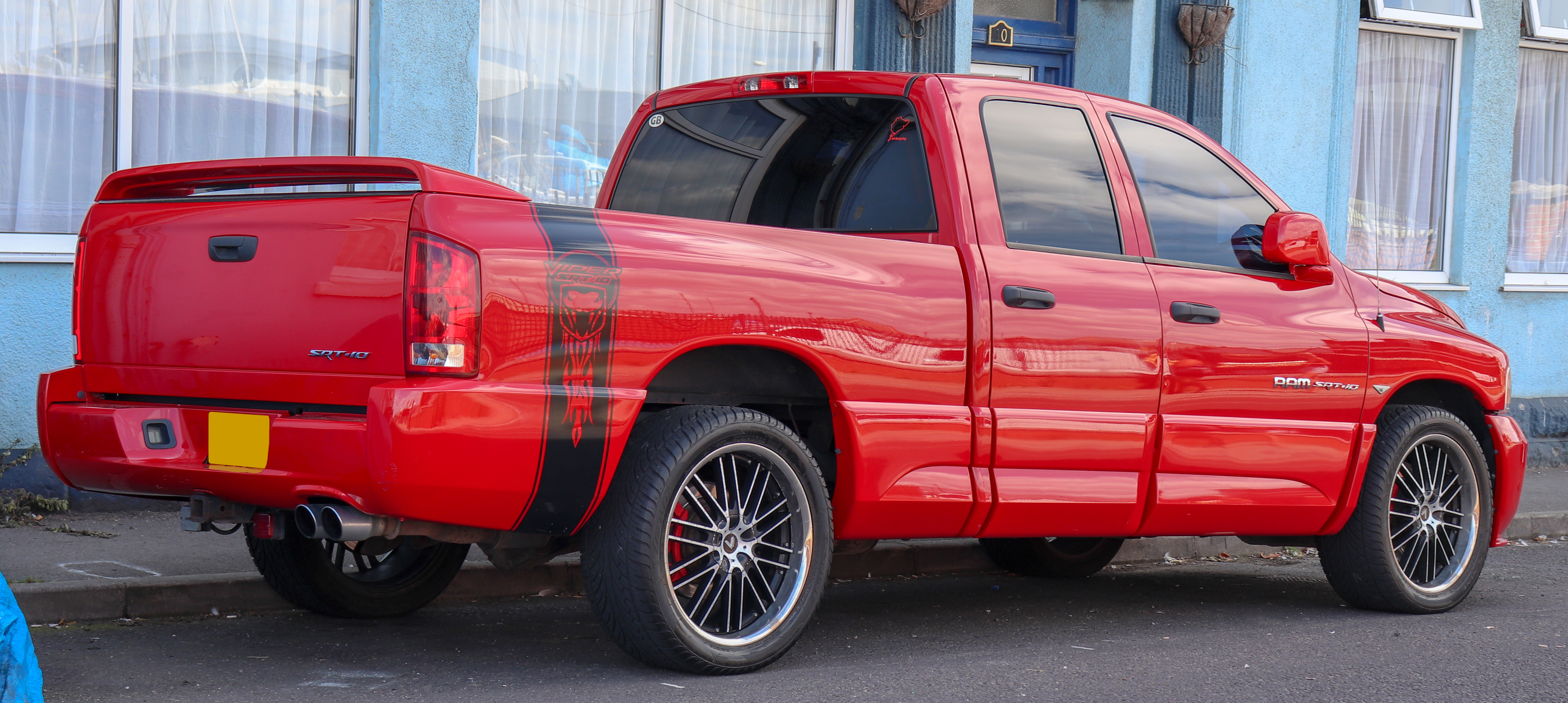
Dodge RAM SRT-10 Quad Cab (aftermarket wheels and decals)

Following the success of the Ram SRT-10 regular cab, Dodge decided to introduce a Quad Cab version starting in the 2005 model year. The new Quad Cab was aimed at enthusiasts who wanted a performance truck, but did not want a single cab. The Quad Cab was fitted with a 4.56 final-drive gear ratio to improve low-end acceleration and was rated at 7,500 lb (3,402 kg) towing capacity. A body-color aluminum tonneau cover with an aerodynamic spoiler came standard on the Quad Cab. The Quad Cab was only offered with a 4-speed automatic transmission (the 48RE borrowed from the Heavy Duty with the Cummins ISB turbo-diesel). The 48RE was rated to handle up to 700 lb⋅ft (949 N⋅m) of torque.

== Special editions ==
Dodge released several limited editions of the Ram SRT-10 alongside the standard regular cab and Quad Cab versions.

- VCA (Viper Club of America) Edition – 52 produced, released at the 2004 Daytona Motor Speedway Race in February. Where people were able to enter a raffle, and only the winners of the raffle were able to purchase the vehicle, but, of course the winners were able to sell them again to a third-party. Its paint scheme was white rally stripes on Electric Blue. Engine was also signed by Wolfgang Bernhard, Chrysler Group's former chief operating officer. Available as a 2004 model. 50 of the VCA Edition trucks were manual transmission. Two were converted to an automatic transmission to be Pace Vehicles. The whereabouts of these two RAM SRT-10's is unknown and presumed decommissioned by FCA.
- Yellow Fever – 500 produced was announced, final total produced 497, painted in Solar Yellow exterior paint and black "fanged" stripe on top of hood, came with two-tone interior which featured a yellow center stack bezel, yellow door spears, yellow stitching on steering wheel, seats and Regular Cab manual transmission shifter and yellow embroidering on the SRT-10 floor mats. Also came with special Yellow Fever Edition badges and a serialized Yellow Fever dash plaque. Available as a 2005 model.
- Commemorative Edition – 200 produced was announced, featured Bright White exterior paint with Electric Blue stripes. Interior enhancements included blue stitching on the seats, shift boot, shift knob and steering wheel. Floor mats were embroidered in matching stitching with the SRT-10 logo. In addition, the Commemorative Edition included standard polished wheels, brushed aluminum scuff plates, and a hard tonneau cover. Available as a 2005 model. FCA Records show a total of 201 painted White with Blue Stripes
- Night Runner – 400 produced was announced final total produced 370, painted in Brilliant Black exterior paint, came with Dark Nickel Pearl finish 22 in (559 mm) wheels, black chrome grille inserts, unique Night Runner badges, a black center stack and center console bezel overlay, and a serialized Night Runner dash plaque. Available as a 2006 model.

== End of production ==
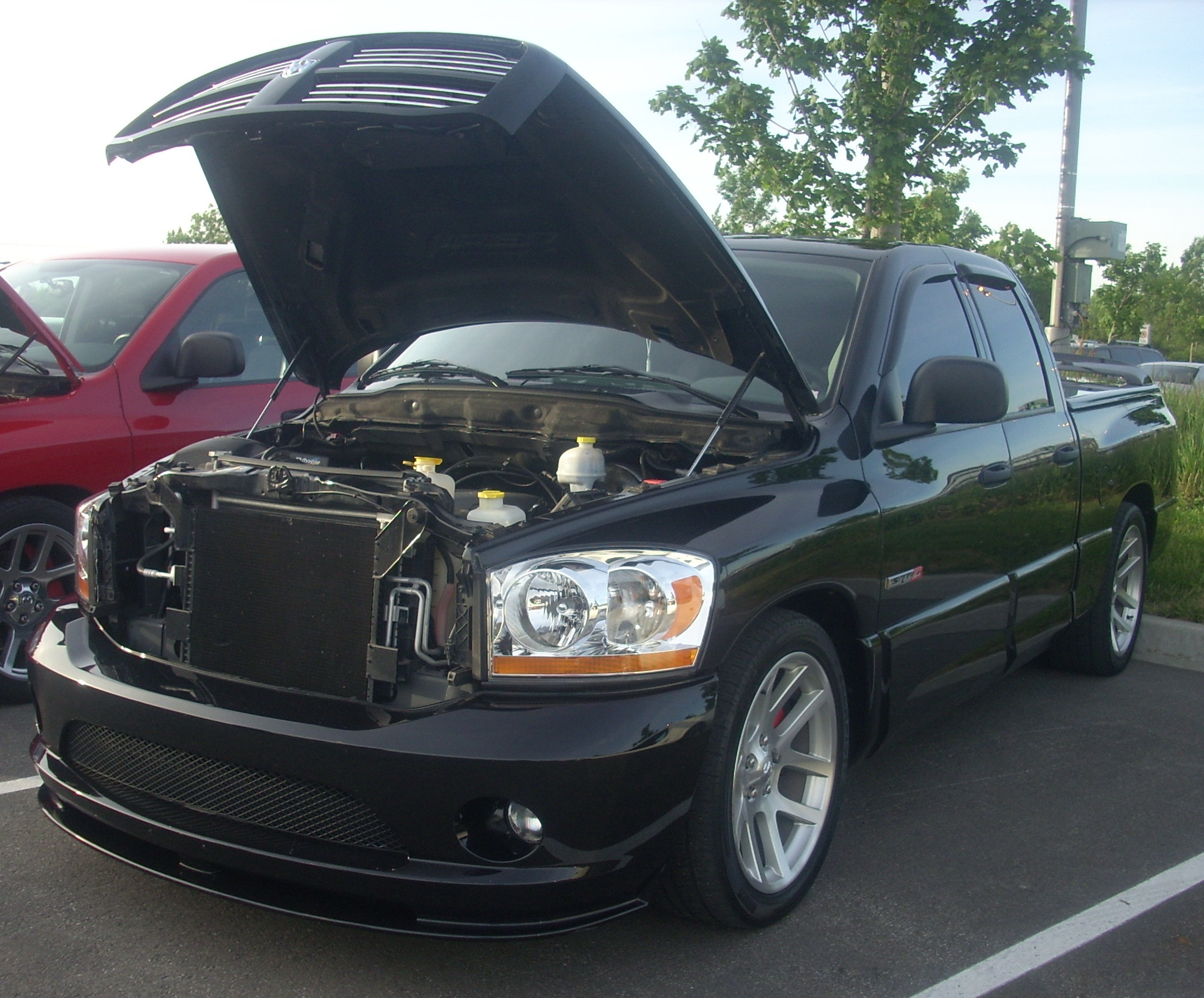
2006 Dodge Ram SRT-10 Quad Cab with open hood

The first SRT-10 was produced November 10, 2003. Ram SRT-10 production ended after the 2006 model year Total production for the 2004 Dodge Ram SRT-10 was 3,057. For 2005, the total production was 5,113 and the 2006 total production was 1,973. Over the 3-year lifespan of this truck, 10,046 Dodge Ram SRT-10s were manufactured.

2004 color breakdown	Regular cab
Black	1269
Flame Red	1040
Bright Silver Metallic	698
VCA Edition	50
Total	3057

2005 color breakdown	Regular cab	Quad cab	Year total
Black	557	1314	1871
Flame Red	517	931	1447
Bright Silver Metallic	332	763	1095
Yellow Fever	201	296	497
White (CE)	201	0	201
Total	1808	3305	5113

2006 color breakdown	Regular cab	Quad cab	Year total
Brilliant Black Crystal	97	215	312
Inferno Red	220	418	638
Mineral Gray	131	310	441
Night Runner	119	251	370
Black Clear Coat	87	97	184
Flame Red	7	8	15
Bright Silver Metallic	6	8	14
Total	664	1309	1973

== World record ==
February 2004 World Record

In July 2004, a Dodge Ram SRT-10, driven by NASCAR driver Brendan Gaughan set both the Guinness World Record and Sports Car Club of America's record for the world's fastest production truck with an average speed of 154.587 mph (248.784 km/h). The record was later surpassed by the HSV Maloo in May 2006.
