= Street and Racing Technology =

Badge of high-performance automobiles made by Chrysler Group US

SRT
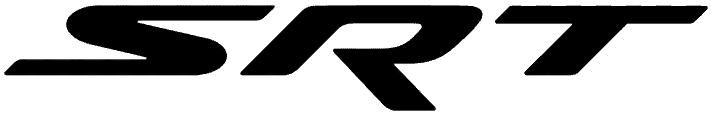
- Product type: Performance cars
- Current owner: Stellantis North America
- Country: United States
- Introduced: 1989; 37 years ago
- Related brands: SS
- Ambassador: Tim Kuniskis (CEO of the division)

Street and Racing Technology (SRT) is an American badge of high-performance vehicles manufactured by Stellantis North America, mainly ones of the Dodge and Ram brands, with several future models planned encompassing the Dodge, Ram, and Jeep brands.

Origins of the badge date back to 1989 when a team known as "Team Viper" was organized to develop the Dodge Viper. It later merged with Team Prowler, the developers of the Plymouth Prowler, to become Specialty Vehicle Engineering (SVE). This was renamed Performance Vehicle Operations (PVO) from January 2002 until around 2004. Since all PVO vehicles used the SRT badge, the development team itself was renamed to SRT in 2004. SRT is used by vehicles of Dodge, Chrysler, and Jeep brands, including police models for Chrysler/FCA Fleet Division.

== Cars ==
SRT emblems

SRT4

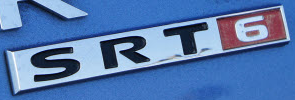
SRT6

SRT8

SRT10

Current SRT emblem

The naming convention used by SRT for its models is indicative of the vehicle's engine type. The number that follows the "SRT" prefix denotes the number of engine cylinders. For example, Chrysler 300C models with 6.1 L Hemi V8s when in the SRT version are named as the Chrysler 300C SRT8. Similarly, the Dodge Viper SRT-10 along with the Dodge Ram SRT-10 had an 8.3 L V10.

Currently, the quickest SRT production models are the 2023 Dodge Challenger Demon 170 with a quarter-mile time of 8.91 seconds, the 2021 Dodge Challenger SRT Super Stock with a quarter-mile time of 10.5 seconds, and the 2021 Dodge Charger SRT Hellcat RedEye with a quarter-mile time of 10.6 seconds.

Chrysler released the 6.4 L Hemi engine in early 2011. 2011-2014 SRT8 versions have 392 Hemi (6.4 L) engine, rated at 470 hp (350 kW) and 470 lb⋅ft (637 N⋅m). The engine was used in the 2012 Dodge Challenger SRT8, Dodge Charger SRT8, Chrysler 300 SRT8, and the Jeep Grand Cherokee SRT8. With the improved engine, the current SRT8 model is not only faster than the previous model but also has better fuel efficiency than the previous one.

In 2012, Chrysler implemented a plan to turn SRT into a separate brand under the Chrysler Group umbrella. During the 2013 and 2014 model years, the Dodge Viper was sold under the model name SRT Viper. In May 2014, the SRT brand was re-consolidated under Dodge, with former SRT CEO Ralph Gilles continuing as senior vice president of product design and also as the CEO and president of Motorsports.

The Jeep Grand Cherokee SRT8 is being sold in China by dealer import methods. Due to increasing interest in American muscle cars, dealers were considering also importing the Dodge Charger and Challenger SRT8 into China. However, little to none of the Charger and Challenger imports to China have been confirmed.

After two years of SRT as an independent division, Fiat Chrysler Automobiles (now Stellantis) announced on May 4, 2014, that the SRT family of vehicles will be consolidated under the Dodge brand. This includes renaming the SRT Viper back to the Dodge Viper. This will expand the Dodge lineup to focus on it as a performance-dedicated brand.

In late 2014, FCA announced a new variant of the Dodge Challenger and Charger models named "SRT Hellcat" and another variant called the "SRT Demon" in early 2017.

== Current vehicles ==
Vehicle	Model Years	Engine	Power	0–60 mph (0–97 km/h)	Quarter Mile
Dodge Durango SRT Hellcat	2021, 2023– (Announced as to 2,000 cars + additional 1000 cars added = 3000 total: then revived for the 2023 model year)	6.2 L supercharged Hellcat V8 engine	717 hp (535 kW; 727 PS)	3.5 seconds	11.7 seconds
Ram 1500 SRT TRX	2027-	6.2 L supercharged Hemi V8 engine	777 hp (579 kW; 788 PS)	3.5	12.9
Ram 1500 Rumble Bee SRT	2027-	6.2 L supercharged Hemi V8 engine	777 hp (579 kW; 788 PS)	3.4	11.6

== Previous vehicles ==
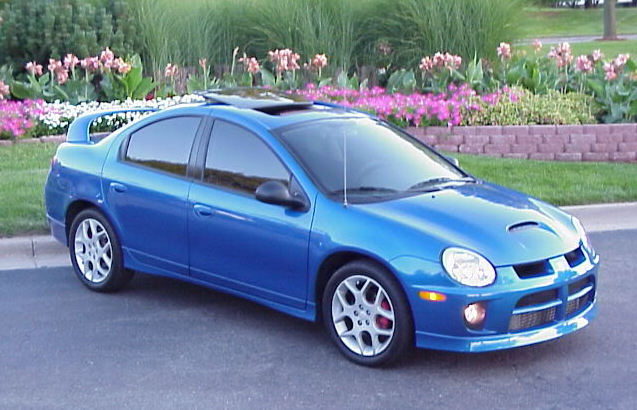
Dodge Neon SRT-4

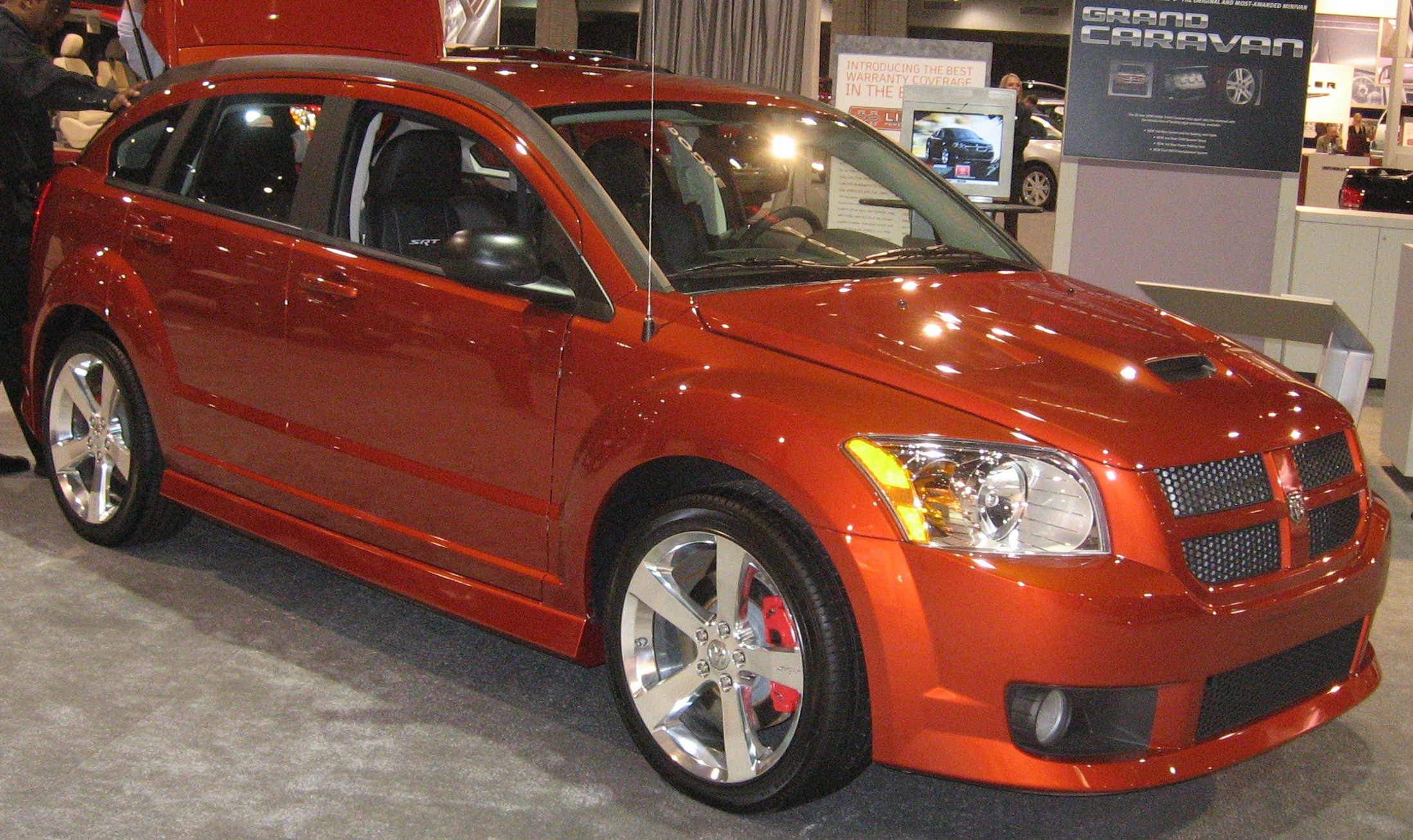
Dodge Caliber SRT4

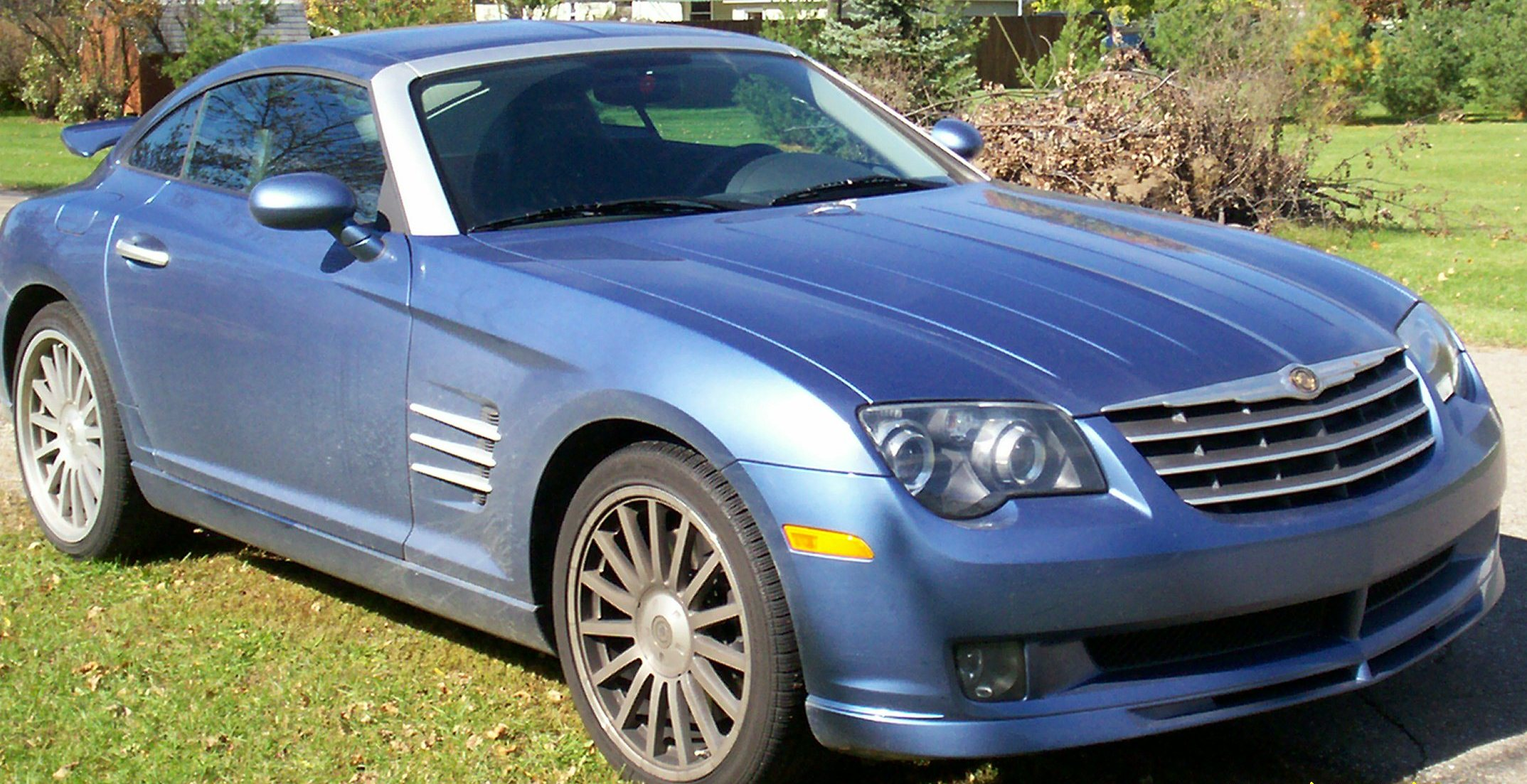
Chrysler Crossfire SRT-6

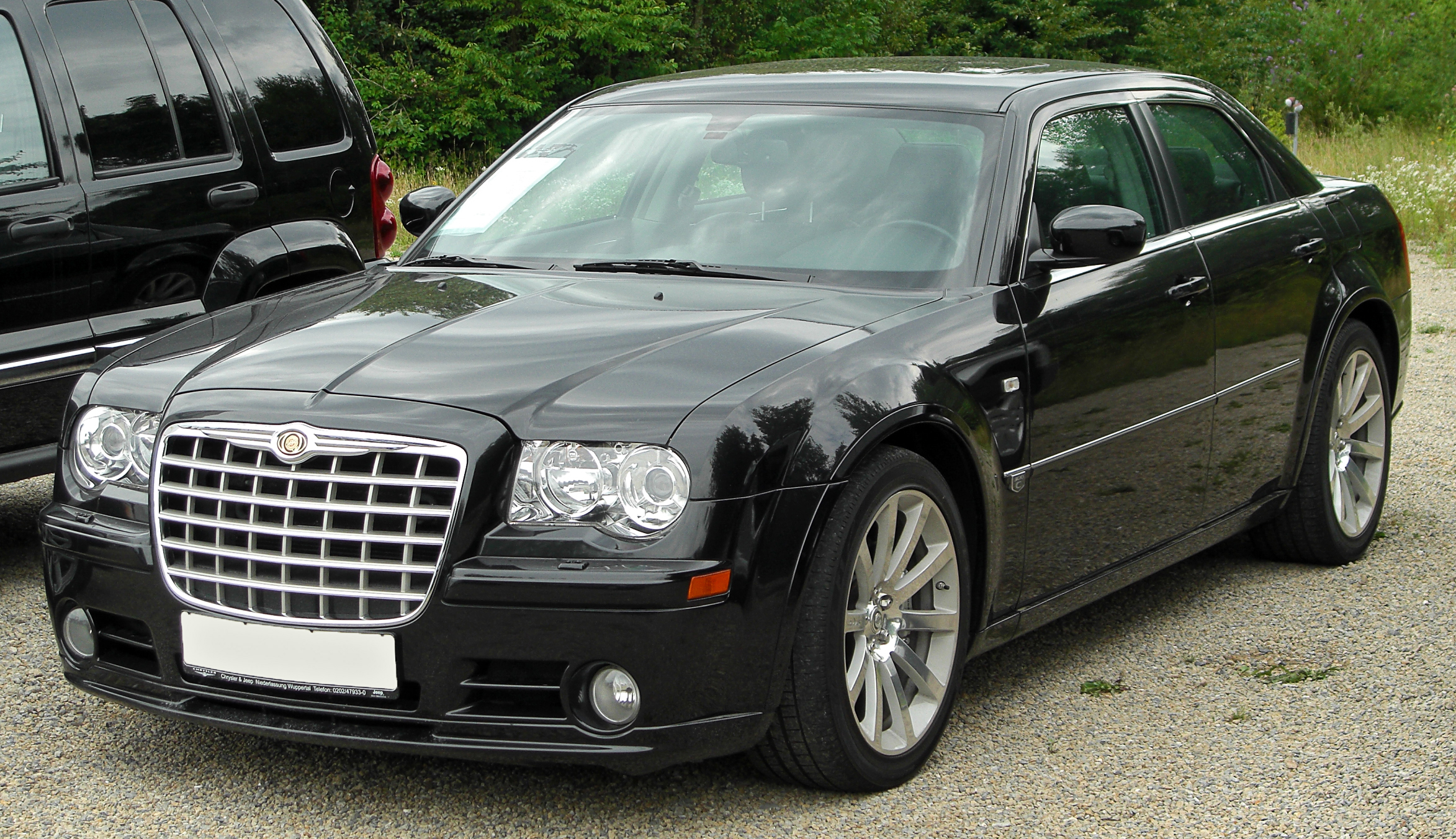
Chrysler 300C SRT8

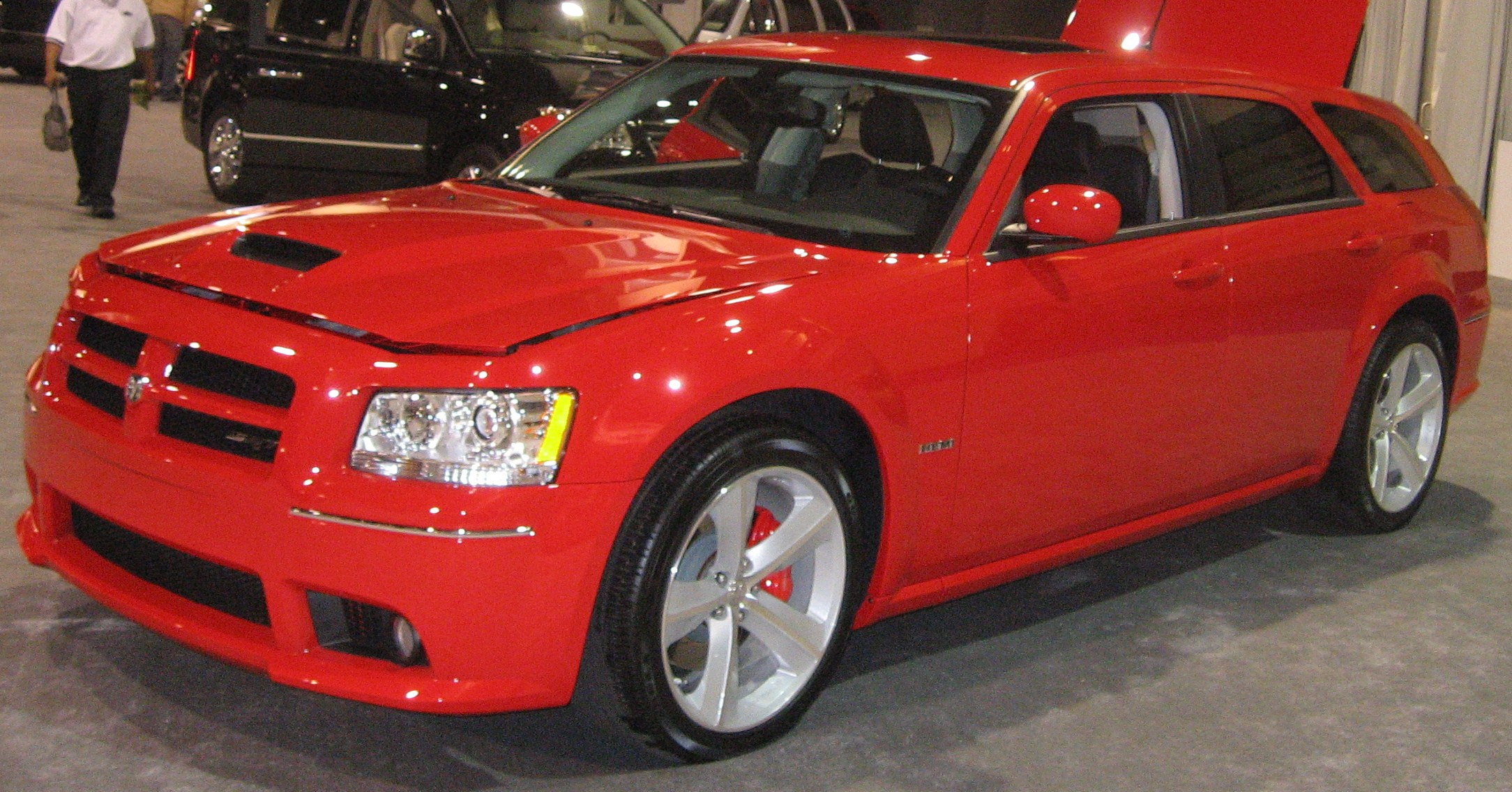
Dodge Magnum SRT8

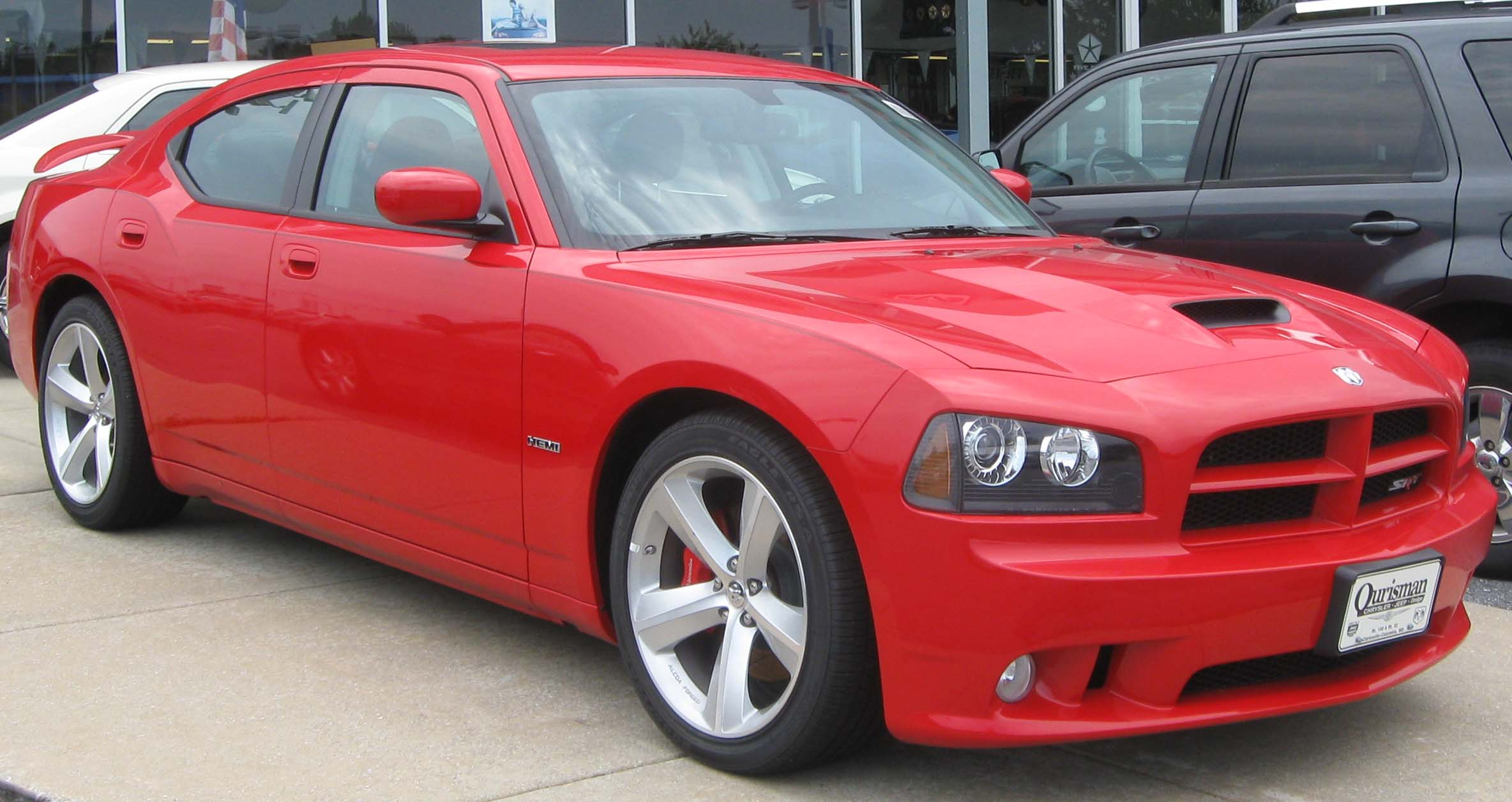
Dodge Charger SRT8

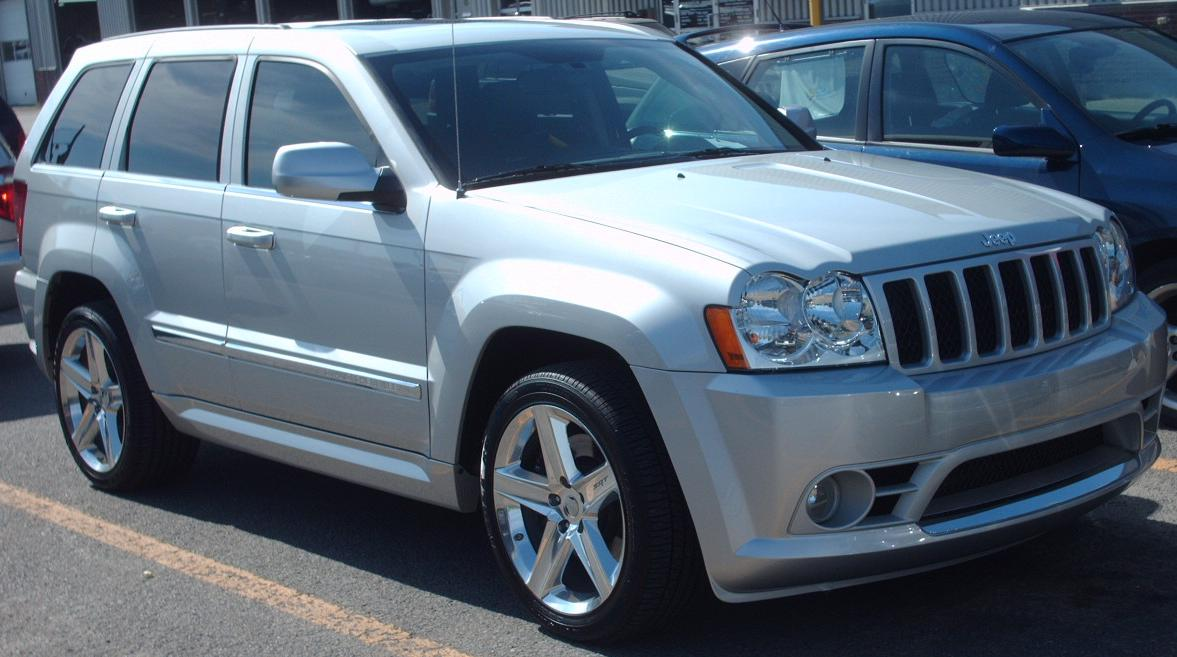
Jeep Grand Cherokee SRT8

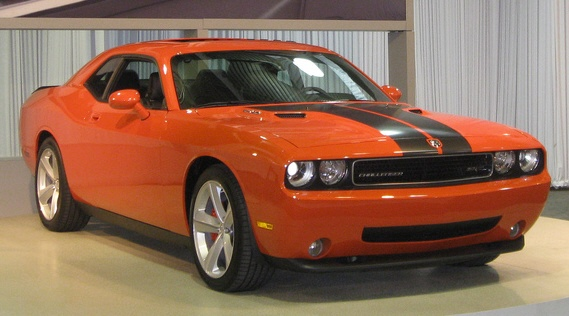
Dodge Challenger SRT8

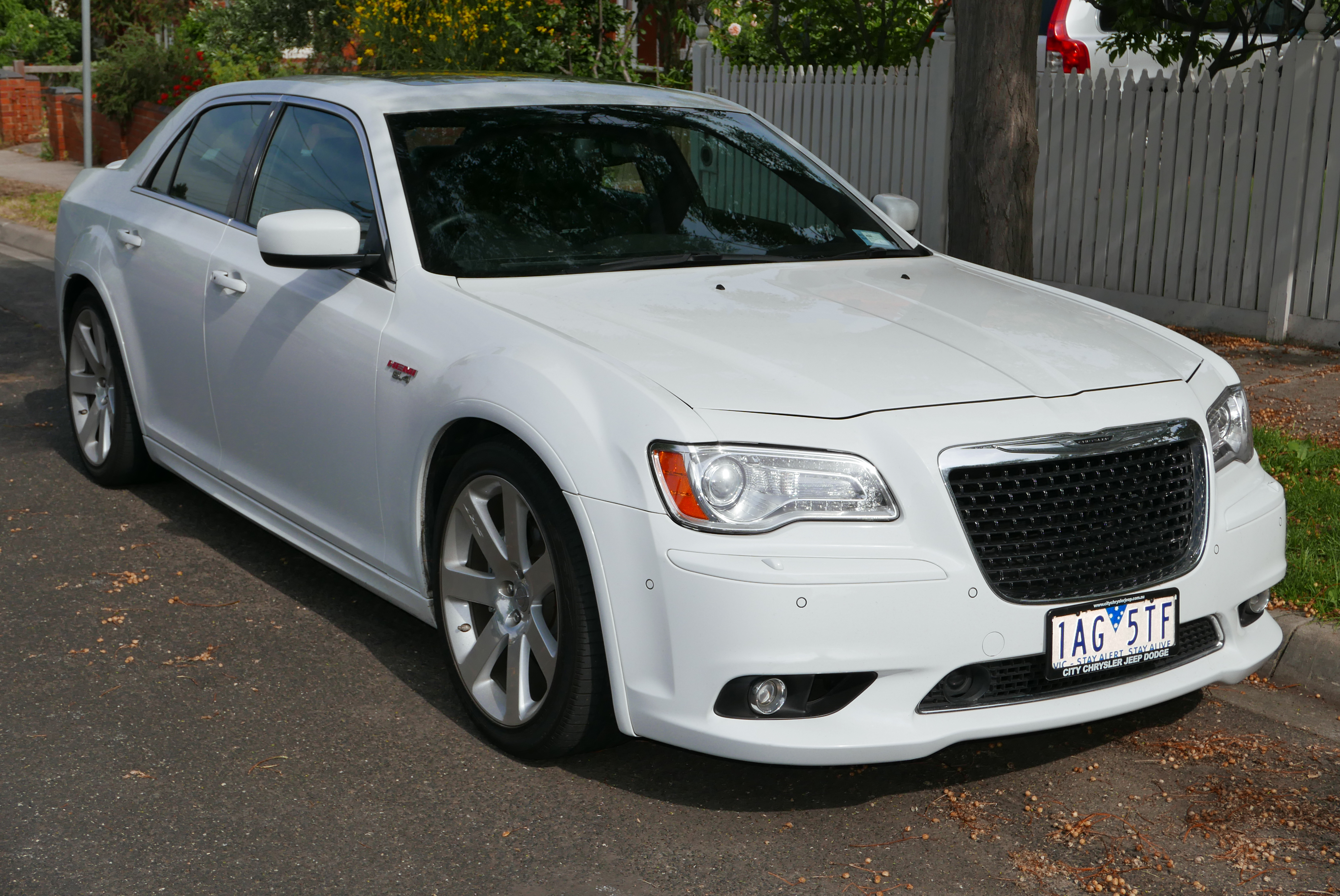
Chrysler 300 SRT

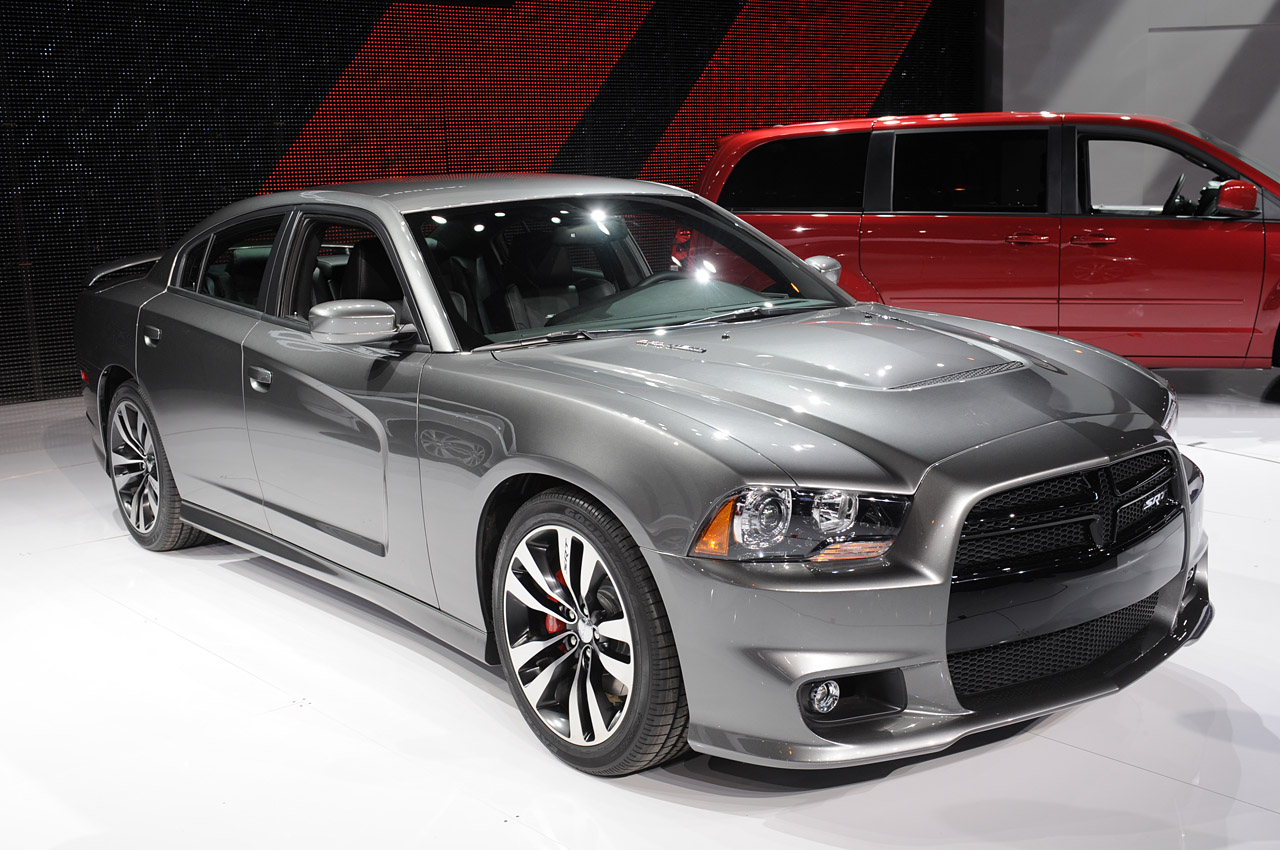
Dodge Charger SRT8

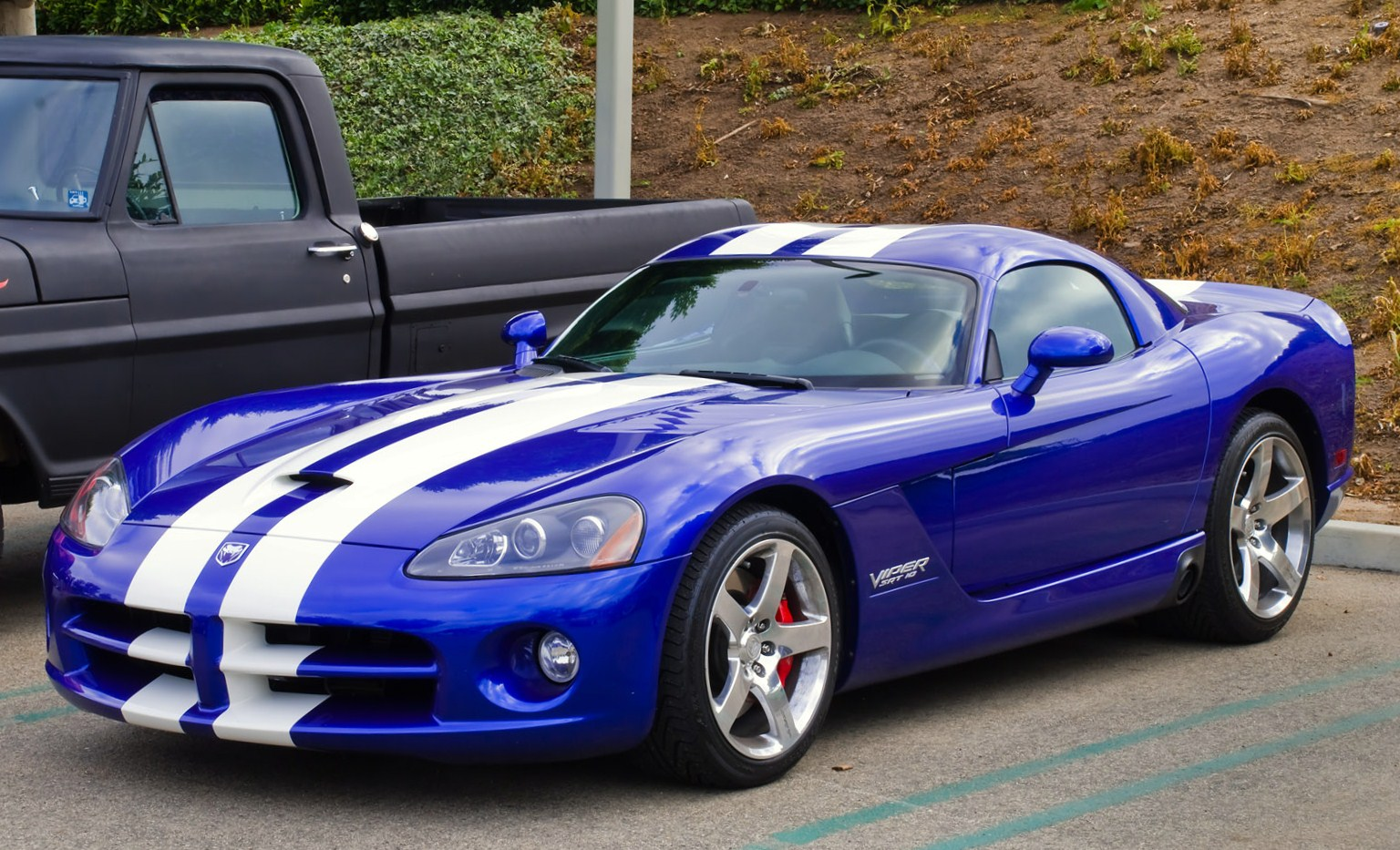
Dodge Viper SRT-10

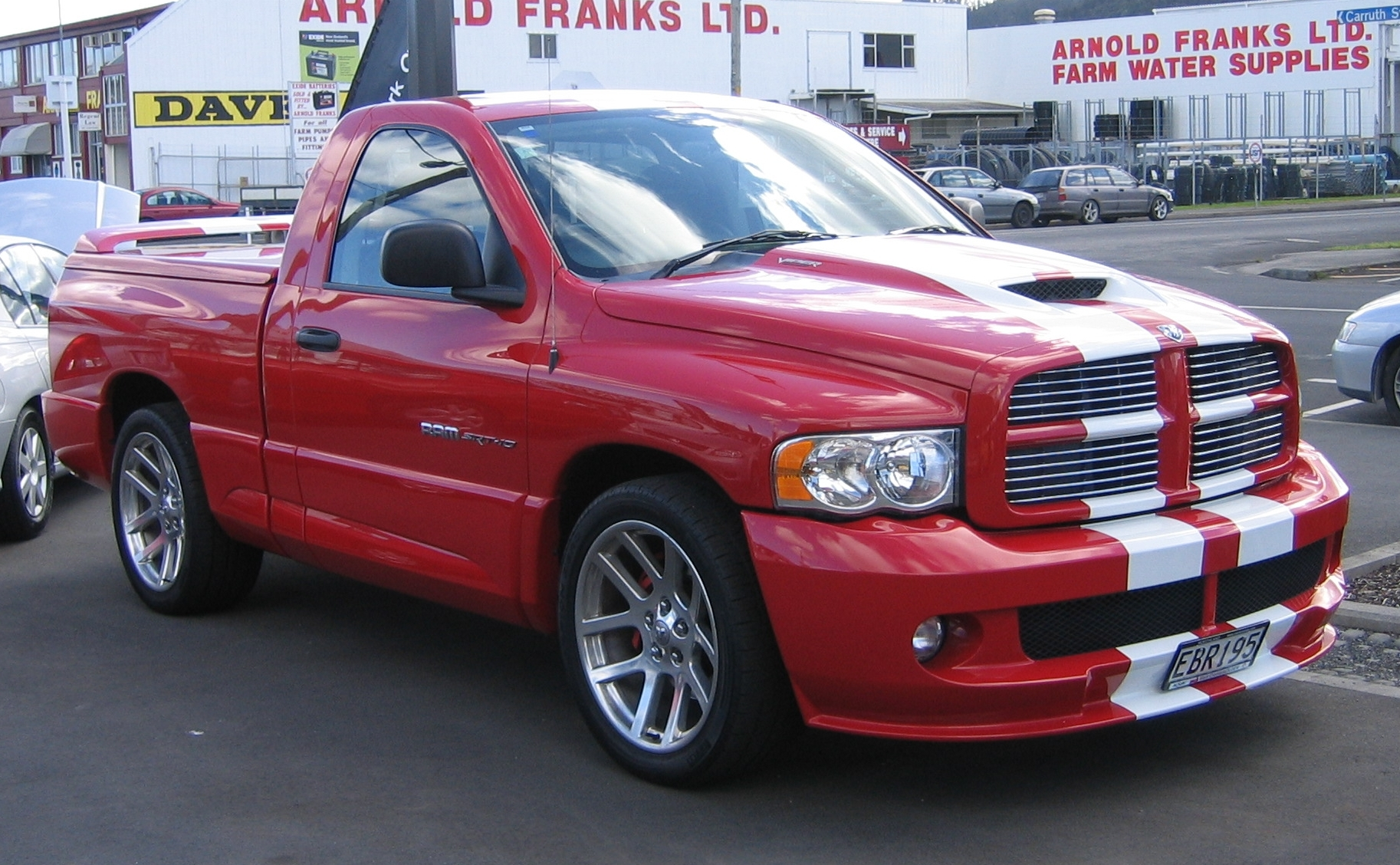
Dodge Ram SRT-10

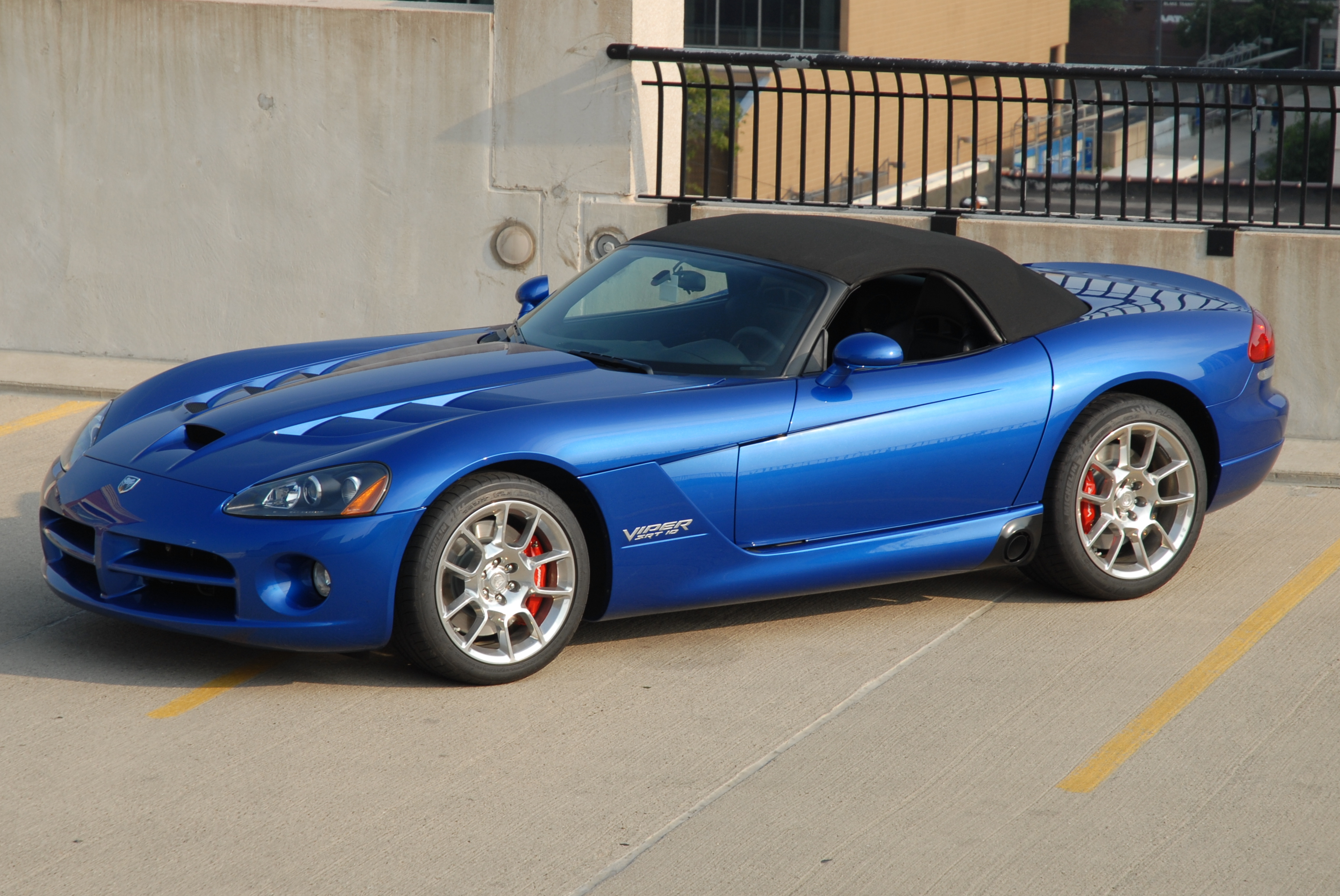
Dodge Viper SRT-10

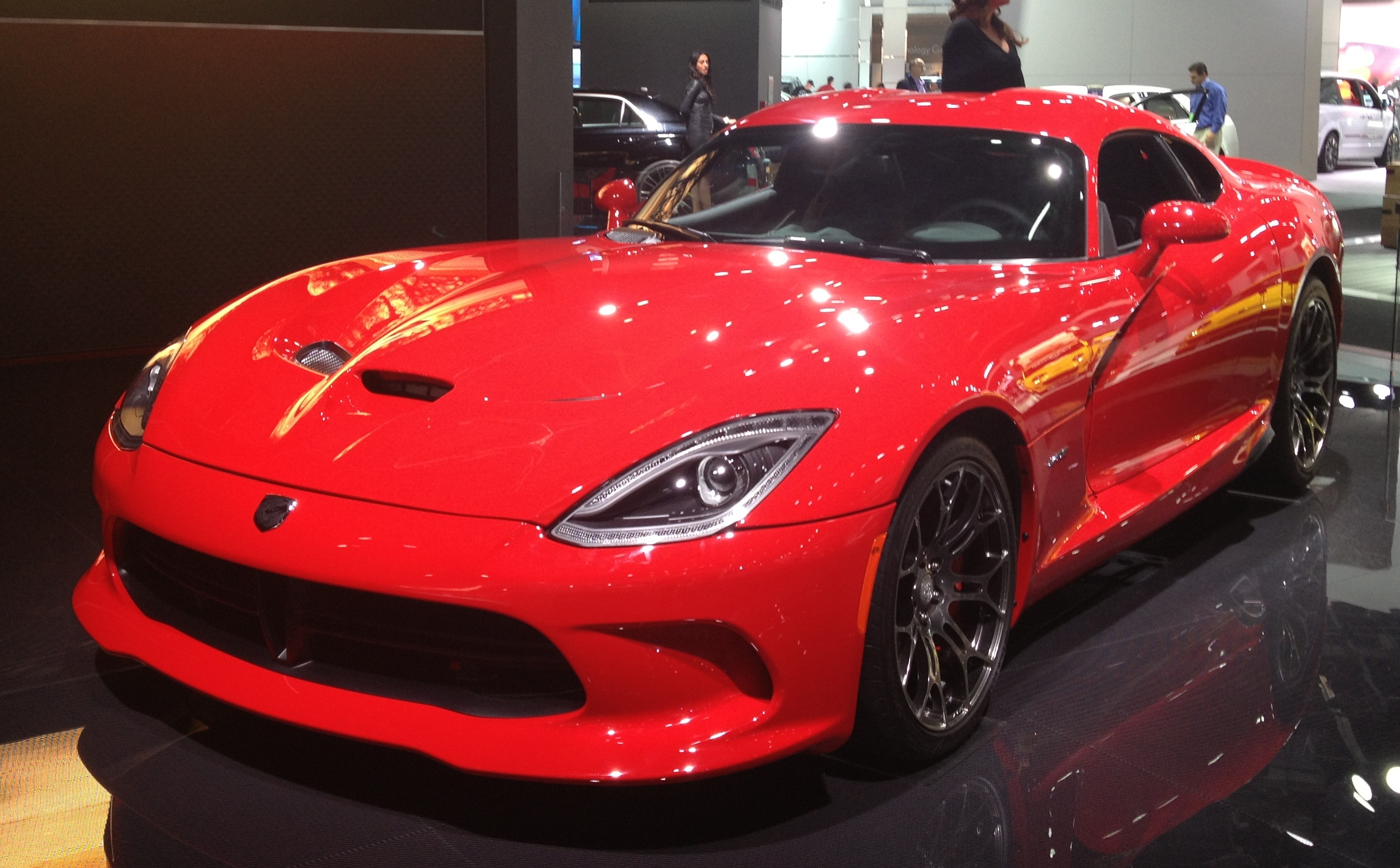
Dodge Viper

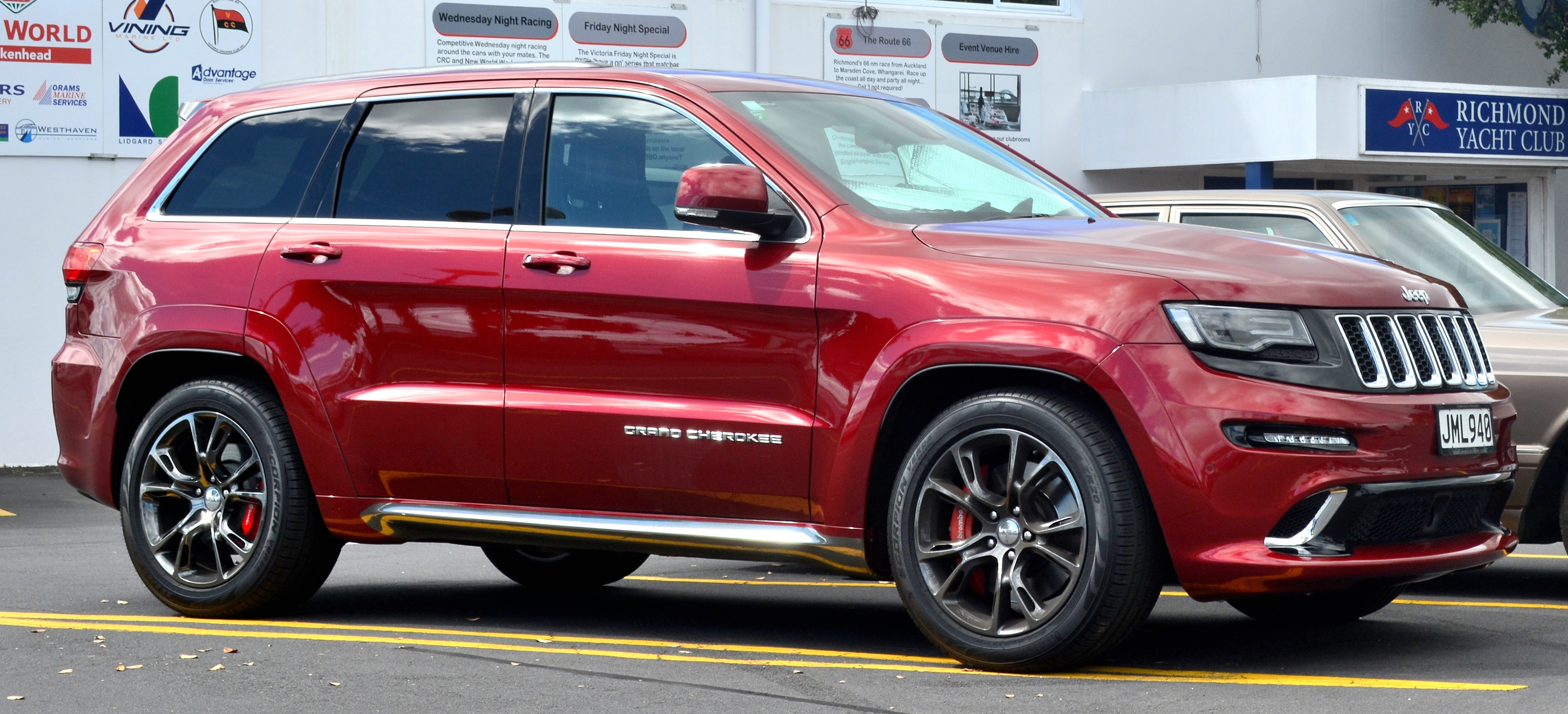
Jeep Grand Cherokee SRT8

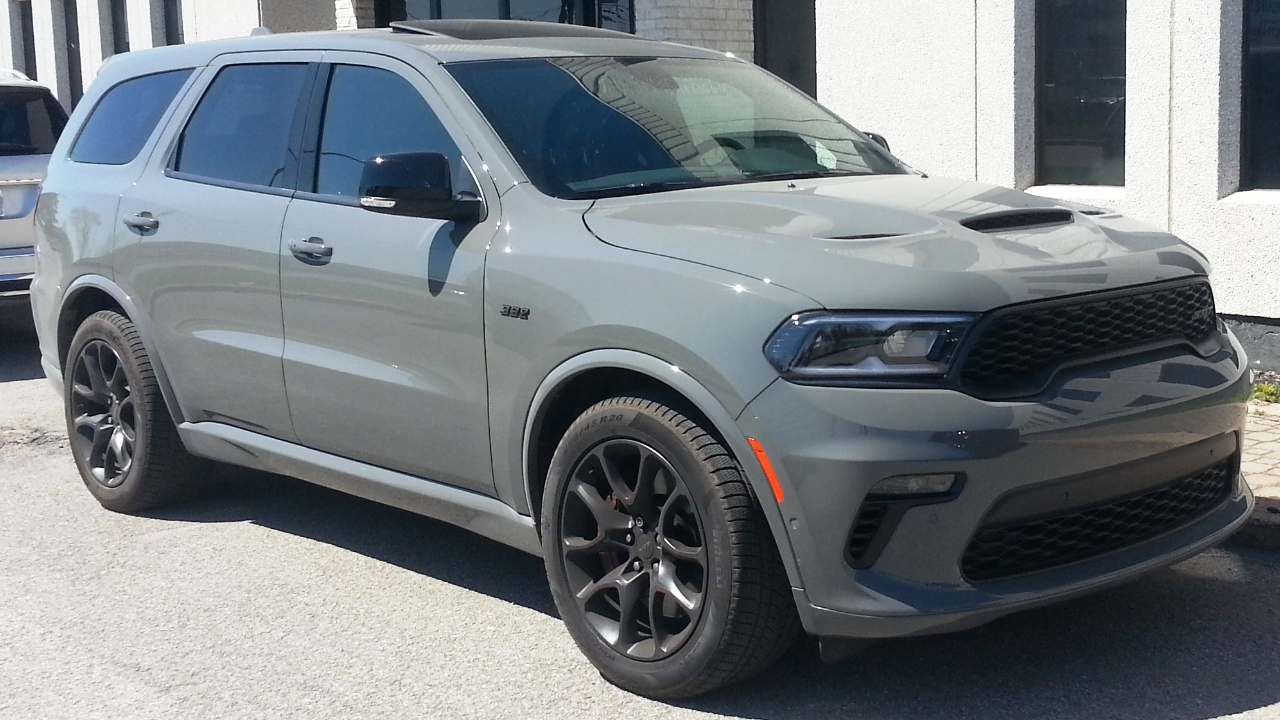
Dodge Durango SRT 392

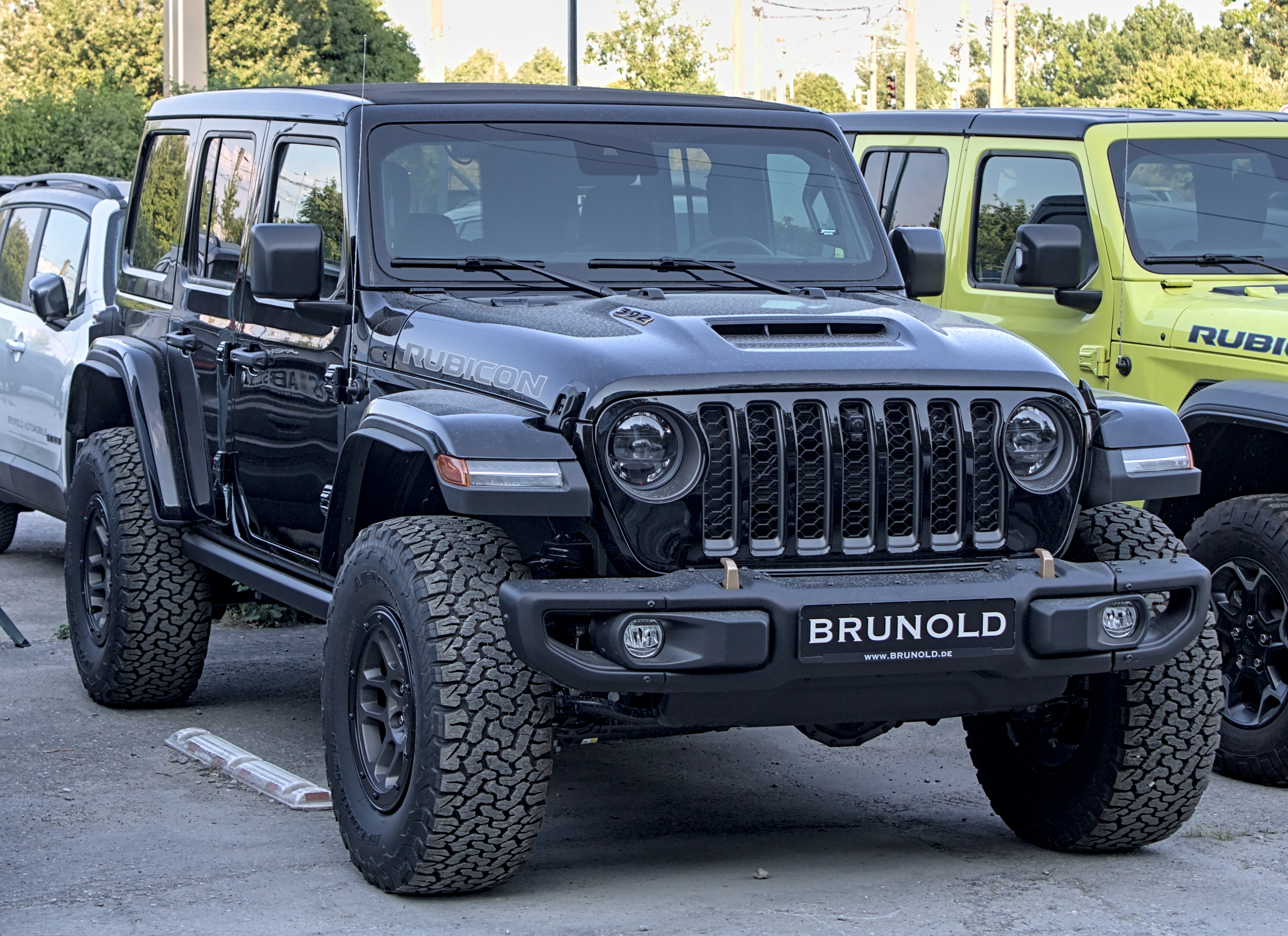
Jeep Wrangler Rubicon 392

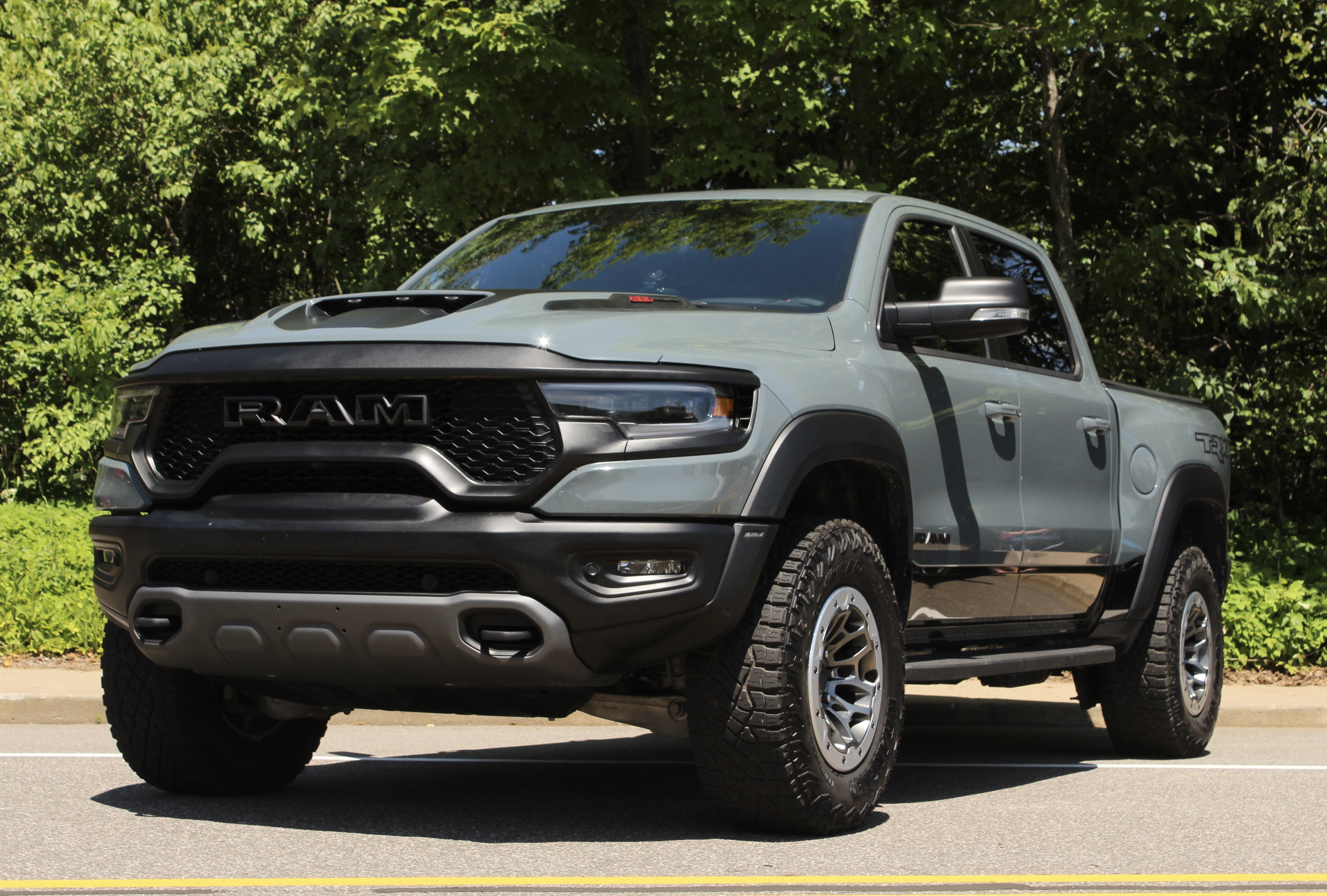
Ram 1500 TRX

Vehicle	Model Years	Type	Engine	Power	0–60 mph (0–97 km/h)	Quarter Mile
Chrysler 300 SRT (after facelift; Australia, New Zealand & Middle East)	2015-2023	SRT 392	6.4L naturally aspirated Apache Hemi V8	485 hp (362 kW; 492 PS)	4.5 seconds	12.6 seconds
Dodge Challenger SRT 392 (after facelift)	2015–2018	SRT 392	6.4L naturally aspirated Apache Hemi V8	485 hp (362 kW; 492 PS)	4.5 seconds	12.6 seconds
Dodge Charger SRT 392 (second generation LD, after facelift)	2015–2018	SRT 392	6.4L naturally aspirated Apache Hemi V8	485 hp (362 kW; 492 PS)	4.6 seconds	12.8 seconds
Jeep Grand Cherokee SRT (fourth-generation WK2, after facelift)	2014–2021	SRT 392	6.4L naturally aspirated Apache Hemi V8	470 hp (350 kW; 477 PS) ('14) 475 hp (354 kW; 482 PS) ('15–present)	4.4 seconds	13.0 seconds
Dodge Durango SRT 392	2018–2024	SRT 392	6.4L naturally aspirated Apache Hemi V8	475 hp (354 kW; 482 PS)	4.4 seconds	12.9 seconds
Jeep Wrangler 392	2021–2025	SRT 392	6.4L naturally aspirated Apache Hemi V8	470 hp (350 kW; 477 PS)	4.5 seconds	12.9 seconds
Dodge Challenger SRT Hellcat	2015–2023	SRT Hellcat	6.2L supercharged Hellcat Hemi V8	707 hp (527 kW; 717 PS)	3.6 seconds	11.2 seconds
Dodge Charger SRT Hellcat	2015–2023	SRT Hellcat	6.2L supercharged Hellcat Hemi V8	707 hp (527 kW; 717 PS)	3.6 seconds	11.0 seconds
Jeep Grand Cherokee SRT Trackhawk (fourth-generation WK2)	2018–2021	SRT Trackhawk	6.2L supercharged Hellcat Hemi V8	707 hp (527 kW; 717 PS)	3.5 seconds	11.6 seconds
Ram 1500 TRX	2021–2024	TRX	6.2L supercharged Hellcat Hemi V8	702 hp (523 kW; 712 PS)	4.5 seconds	12.9 seconds
Dodge Challenger SRT Hellcat Redeye	2020–2023	SRT Redeye	6.2L supercharged Hellcat HO Hemi V8	797 hp (594 kW; 808 PS)	3.6 seconds	10.8 seconds
Dodge Charger SRT Hellcat Redeye	2021–2023	SRT Redeye	6.2L supercharged Hellcat HO Hemi V8	797 hp (594 kW; 808 PS)		
Dodge Challenger SRT Jailbreak	2022	SRT Jailbreak	6.2L supercharged Hellcat HO Hemi V8	807 hp (602 kW; 818 PS)	3.6 seconds	11.0 seconds
Dodge Charger SRT Jailbreak	2022	SRT Jailbreak	6.2L supercharged Hellcat HO Hemi V8	807 hp (602 kW; 818 PS)	3.6 seconds	11.0 seconds
Dodge Challenger SRT Demon	2017–2018 (Limited to 3,500 cars)	SRT Demon	6.2L supercharged Demon Hemi V8	840 hp (626 kW; 852 PS)	2.3 seconds	9.65 seconds
Dodge Neon SRT-4	2003-2005	SRT-4	2.4 L turbocharged I4	215 hp (160 kW; 218 PS) (2003) 230 hp (172 kW; 233 PS) (2004 & 2005)	5.6 seconds ('03); 5.3 seconds ('04-05)	14.1 seconds ('03); 13.9 seconds (2004 & 2005)
Dodge Caliber SRT4	2008-2009	SRT-4	2.4 L turbocharged World I4	285 hp (213 kW; 289 PS)	6.2 seconds	14.6 seconds
Chrysler Crossfire SRT-6	2005-2006	SRT-6	3.2 L Mercedes-AMG M112 V6	350 hp (261 kW; 355 PS)	4.8 seconds	12.8 seconds
Chrysler 300C SRT8 (first generation)	2005-2010	SRT8	6.1 L naturally aspirated Hemi V8	425 hp (317 kW; 431 PS)	4.7 seconds	13.2 seconds
Dodge Magnum SRT8	2005-2008	SRT8	6.1 L naturally aspirated Hemi V8	425 hp (317 kW; 431 PS)	5.6 seconds	13.7 seconds
Dodge Charger SRT8 (first generation LX)	2006-2010	SRT8	6.1 L naturally aspirated Hemi V8	425 hp (317 kW; 431 PS)	5.4 seconds	13.5 seconds
Jeep Grand Cherokee SRT8 (third generation WK)	2006-2010	SRT8	6.1 L naturally aspirated Hemi V8	420 hp (313 kW; 426 PS)	5.2 seconds	13.5 seconds
Dodge Challenger SRT8 (before facelift)	2008-2014	SRT8	6.1 L naturally aspirated V8 (2008-2010) 6.4 L naturally aspirated V8 (2011-2014)	425 hp (317 kW; 431 PS) 470 hp (350 kW; 480 PS)	5.3 seconds (2008-2010) 4.5 seconds ('11-14)	13.6 seconds ('08-10) 12.9 seconds ('11-14)
Chrysler 300 SRT8 (second generation, US version)	2011-2015	SRT8	6.4 L naturally aspirated Apache Hemi V8	470 hp (350 kW; 477 PS)	4.0 seconds	---
Dodge Charger SRT8 (second generation LD, before facelift)	2012-2014	SRT8	6.4 L naturally aspirated Apache Hemi V8	470 hp (350 kW; 477 PS)	4.6 seconds	12.8 seconds
Jeep Grand Cherokee SRT8 (fourth-generation WK2, before facelift)	2012-2013	SRT8	6.4 L naturally aspirated Apache Hemi V8	470 hp (350 kW; 477 PS)	4.6 seconds	13.3 seconds
Dodge Viper SRT-10 (third generation ZB I)	2003-2007	SRT-10	8.3 L naturally aspirated Viper V10	500 hp (373 kW; 507 PS)	3.7 seconds	11.7 seconds
Dodge Ram SRT-10	2004-2006	SRT-10	8.3 L naturally aspirated Viper V10	500 hp (373 kW; 507 PS)	5.4 seconds	13.8 seconds
Dodge Viper SRT-10 (fourth generation ZB II)	2008-2010	SRT-10	8.4 L naturally aspirated Viper V10	600 hp (447 kW; 608 PS)	3.8 seconds	10.9 seconds
Dodge Viper SRT	2013-2017	SRT	8.4 L naturally aspirated Viper V10	640 hp (477 kW; 649 PS) ('12-14) 645 hp (481 kW; 654 PS) ('15-17)	3.5 seconds	11.5 seconds
Chrysler 300C SRT Design (first generation)	2008-2010	SRT	3.0 L Mercedes-Benz OM642 V6 Diesel	215 hp (160 kW; 218 PS)	7.6 seconds	14.6 seconds

== Manufacturer engines ==
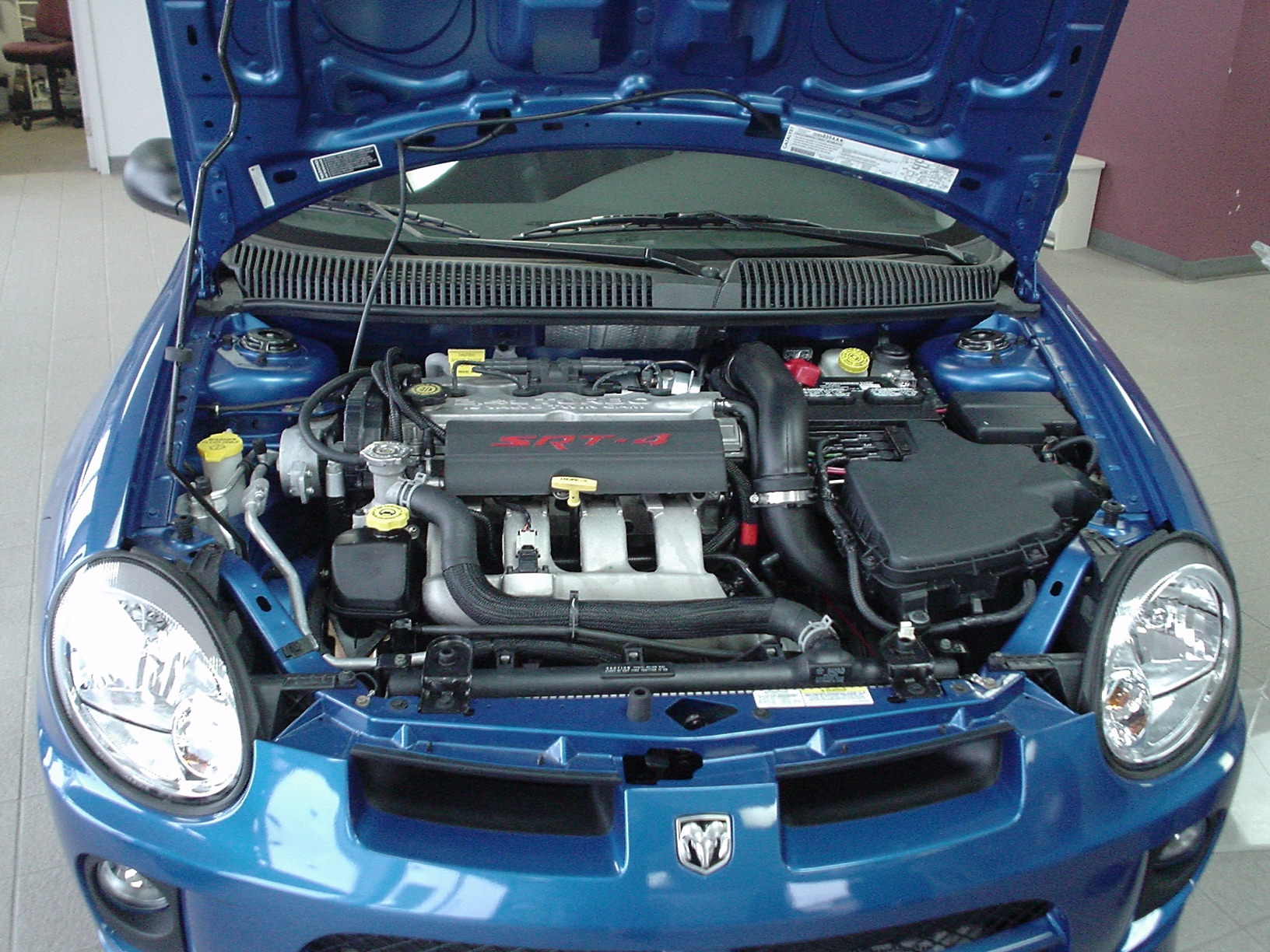
The 2.4 L inline-4 used by the Neon SRT-4, the second SRT car built behind the Viper.

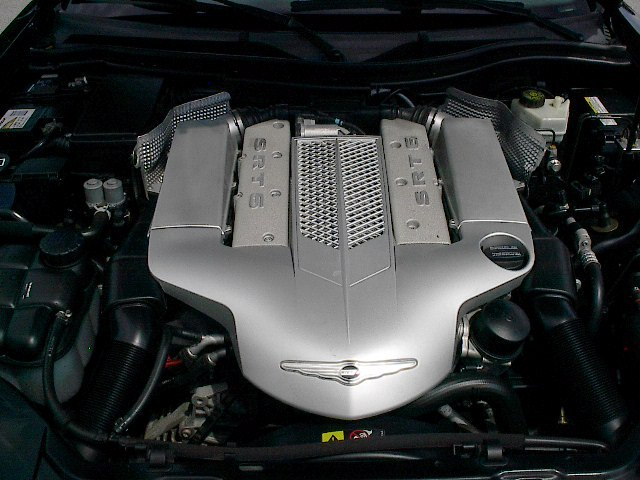
The only 6-cylinder engine to be featured in a SRT car, the Mercedes M112 engine was used for the Crossfire SRT-6.

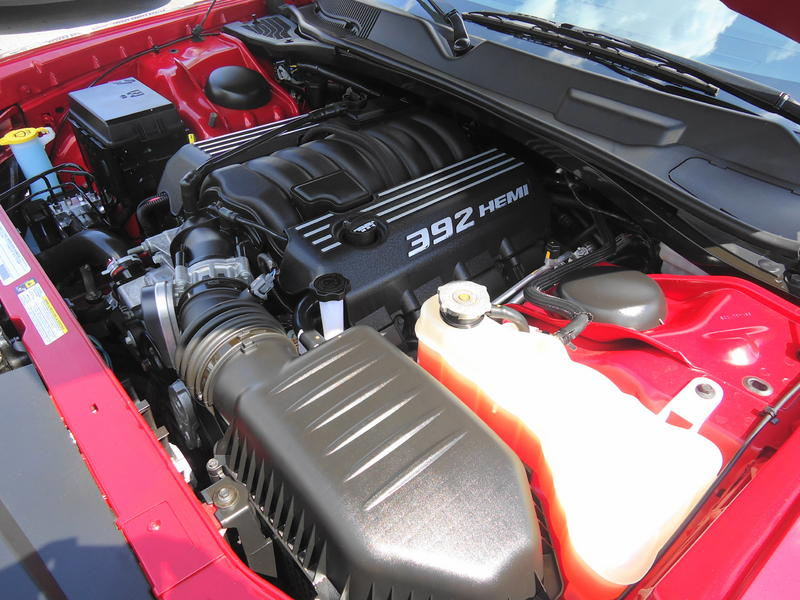
The 392 Hemi V8 engine used for the Challenger and Charger SRT 392 models.

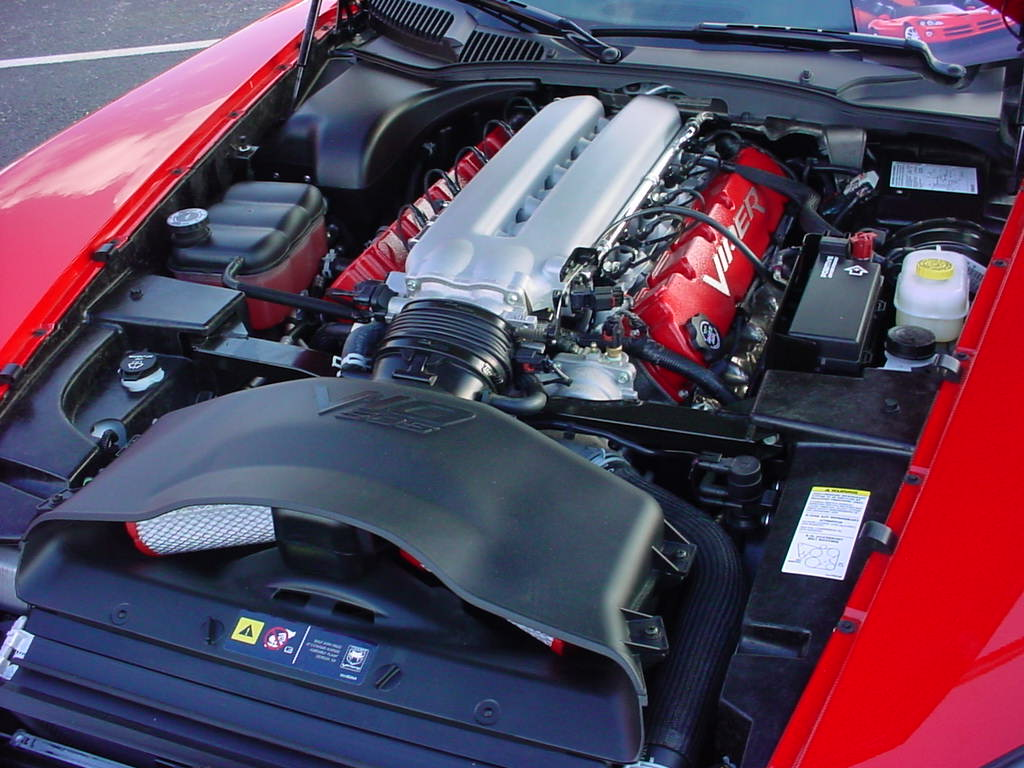
The Viper V10 engine used by the Viper and Ram SRT-10 models.

SRT has made six engines so far, and one derived engine. Their first two engines were the third generation ZB I's 8.3 L naturally aspirated Viper V10 and the Neon SRT-4's 2.4 L turbocharged I4.

=== 4-cylinder engines ===
SRT's 2.4 L turbocharged I4 for the Neon SRT-4 had produced 215 hp (160 kW; 218 PS) in 2003 and 230 hp (172 kW; 233 PS) later in 2004 and 2005. Another 2.4 L I4 was made, but this time was based on the Chrysler World Engine, and was made for the Caliber SRT4. That engine was rated at 285 hp (213 kW; 289 PS).

=== 6-cylinder engines ===
The Crossfire SRT-6 never had a SRT-made engine, instead sourcing the M112k engines from Mercedes-Benz (used in the Mercedes C32 AMG and SLK32 AMG) which produced 350 hp (261 kW; 355 PS).

=== 8-cylinder engines ===
SRT has built four V8s, which it has applied to five vehicles: Chrysler 300, Dodge Challenger, Dodge Charger, Dodge Magnum, and Jeep Grand Cherokee. Their first V8 was a 6.1 L naturally aspirated Hemi V8 engine that made 425 hp (317 kW; 431 PS). However, the Jeep Grand Cherokee SRT8 only had 420 hp (313 kW; 426 PS). Their second unit is a 6.4 L naturally aspirated Apache V8 engine that originally made 470 hp (350 kW; 477 PS) but was upgraded to produce 485 hp (362 kW; 492 PS) after 2014. SRT's most powerful variant is a 6.2 L supercharged V8, with two separate units used on the Hellcat and Demon models. The Hellcat's version makes 707 hp (527 kW; 717 PS) and the Demon's makes 808 hp (603 kW; 819 PS). On 100-octane fuel, though, the Demon's engine makes 840 hp (626 kW; 852 PS).

=== 10-cylinder engines ===
SRT's 10-cylinder engines have only been used in two models, the Viper and the Ram SRT-10. The first versions, the 8.3 L naturally aspirated Viper V10, produced 500 hp (373 kW; 507 PS). The second version used a larger bore and stroked 8.4 L naturally aspirated Viper V10, which increased the output to 600 hp (447 kW; 608 PS). The last generation Viper used a brand new engine, but still kept the 8.4 L displacement. The engine produced 640 hp (477 kW; 649 PS), which then increased to 645 hp (481 kW; 654 PS) after the Dodge-SRT absorption.

== See also ==
- Chrysler Hemi engine
- Dodge R/T Vehicles
