= Dodge Viper (ZB I) =

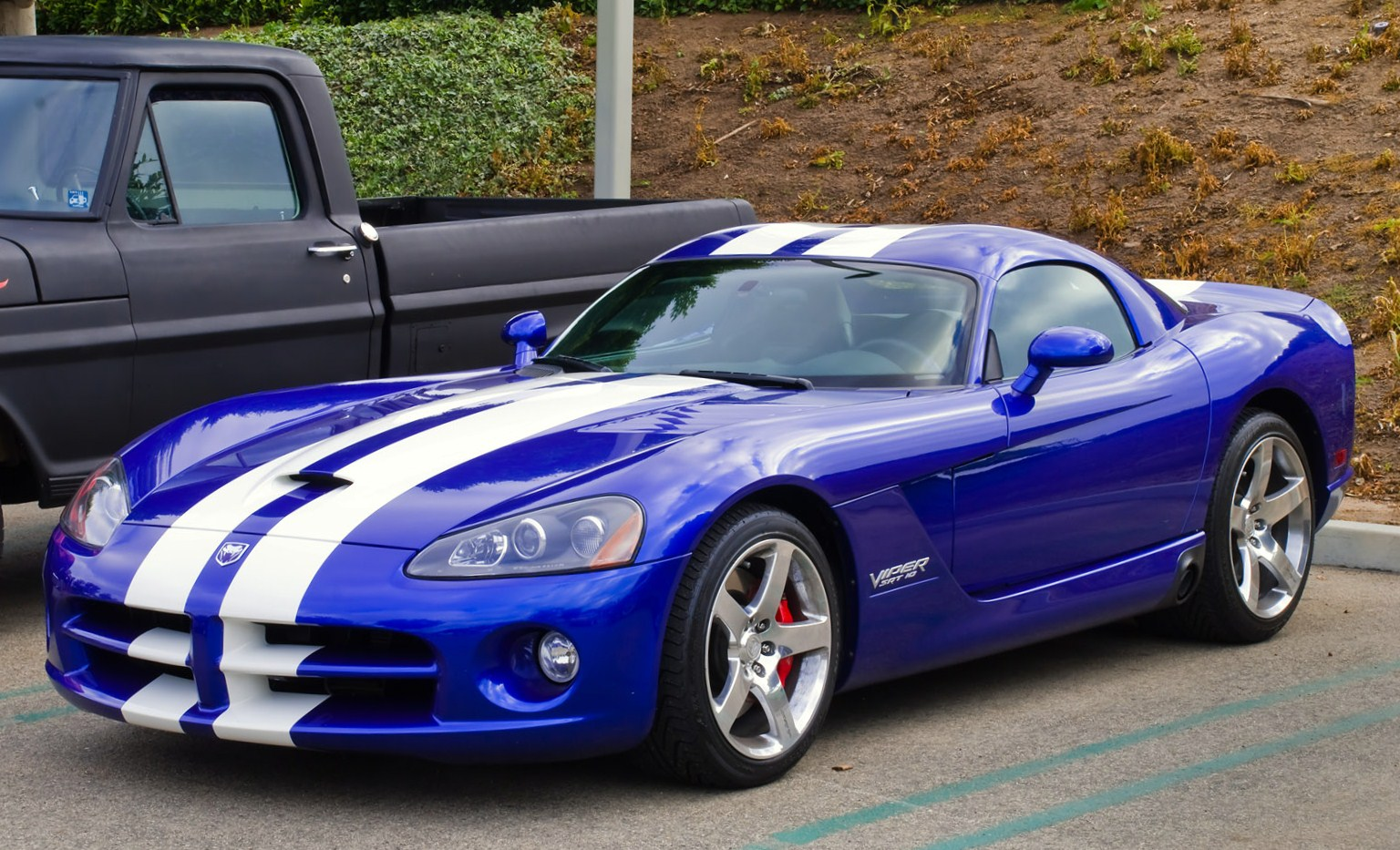
- 2006 Dodge Viper SRT-10 coupe

Overview
- Also called: Dodge SRT-10 (UK)
- Production: 2002–2006; 8,190 units
- Model years: 2003–2006
- Assembly: Conner Avenue Assembly, Detroit, Michigan, United States
- Designer: Osamu Shikado (roadster); Ralph Gilles (coupé)

Body and chassis
- Class: Sports car (S)
- Body style: 2-door convertible; 2-door liftback coupé
- Layout: Front mid-engine, rear-wheel-drive
- Related: Bristol Fighter

Powertrain
- Engine: 8.3-liter (506.5 cu in) odd-firing Viper EWC V10
- Power output: SRT-10 roadster: 500 hp (507 PS; 373 kW) 525 lb⋅ft (712 N⋅m); SRT-10 coupé: 510 hp (517 PS; 380 kW) 535 lb⋅ft (725 N⋅m)
- Transmission: 6-speed Tremec T56 manual

Dimensions
- Wheelbase: 2,510 mm (98.8 in)
- Length: 4,460 mm (175.6 in)
- Width: 1,922 mm (75.7 in)
- Height: Coupé: 1,210 mm (47.6 in); Roadster: 1,230 mm (48.4 in)
- Curb weight: coupé: 1,556 kg (3,430 lb); roadster: 1,530 kg (3,373 lb)

Chronology
- Predecessor: Dodge Viper (SR II)
- Successor: Dodge Viper (ZB II)

The Dodge Viper (ZB I) is the third-generation Viper sports car, manufactured by Dodge. The third generation received a heavy design change, designed by Osamu Shikado in 1999.

== Development ==
The third-generation Dodge Viper was redesigned, courtesy of Osamu Shikado from Dodge's performance division, Street & Racing Technology. The design took inspiration from the Viper competition coupé concept, also designed by Shikado which was unveiled two years prior as a preview for the next-generation Viper.

== Production ==
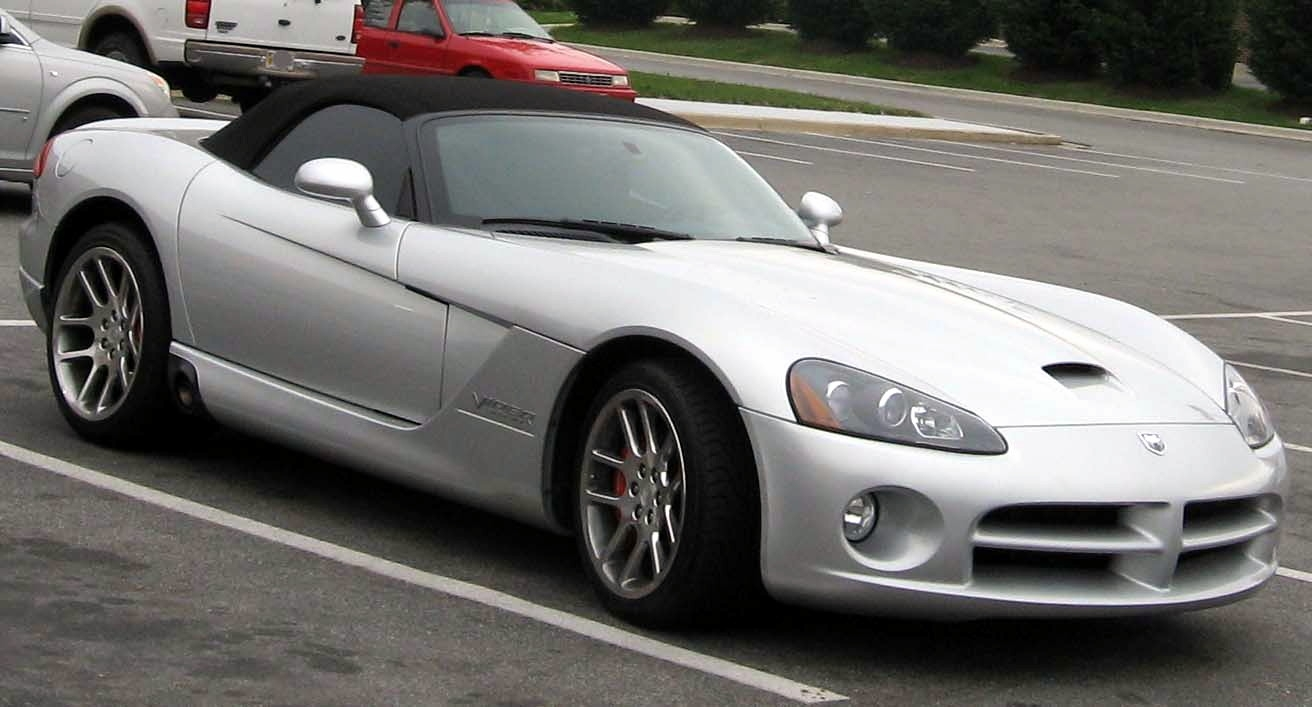
The third generation of the Viper would get heavy design updates.

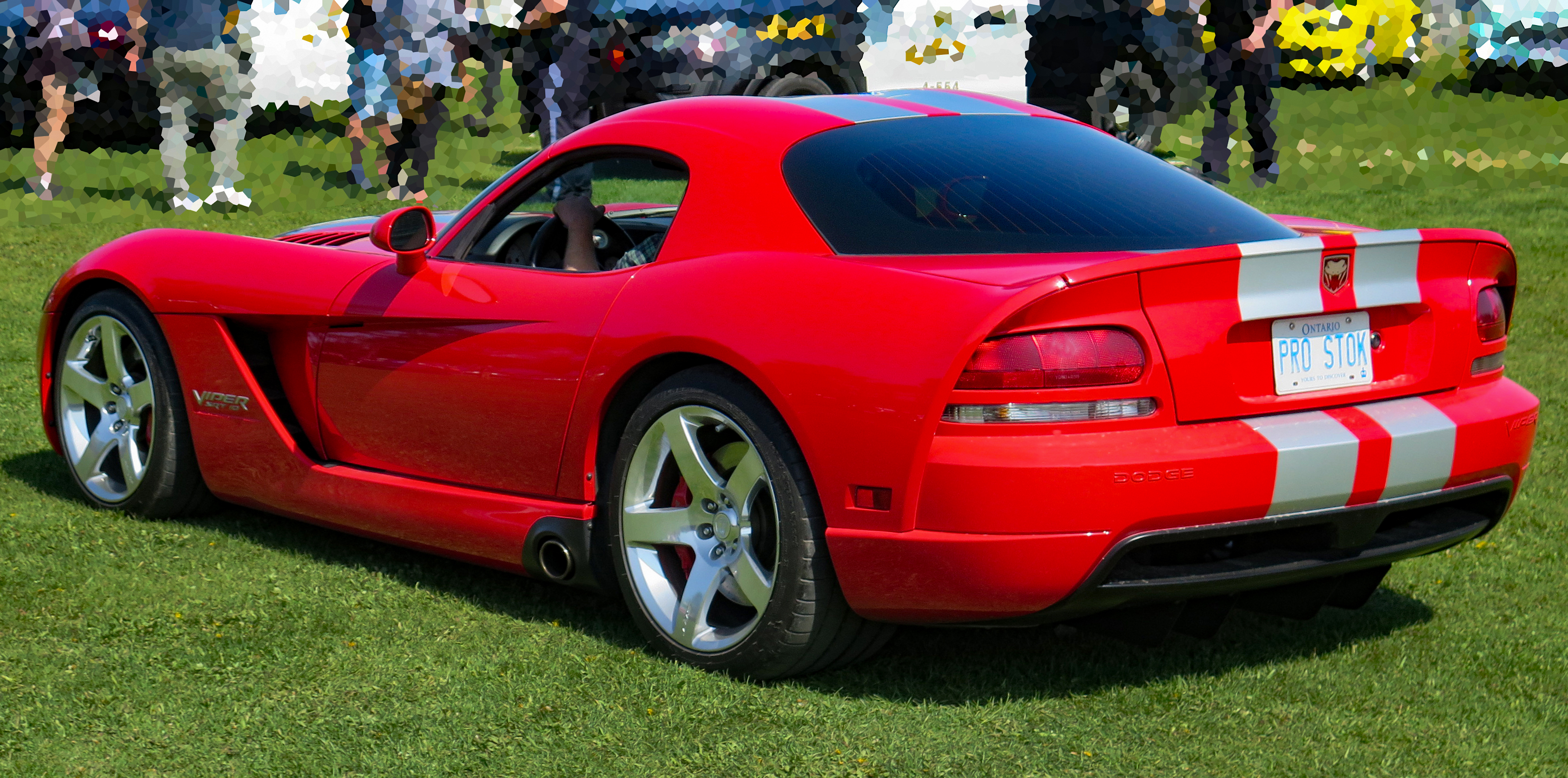
2006 Dodge Viper SRT-10 Coupe rear

The new Viper was introduced at 2001 Detroit Auto Show, and went on sale in 2003 as the SRT-10, which replaced both the RT/10 and GTS models. The engine displacement was increased from 8.0 to 8.3 liters, and along with other upgrades, the engine produced a maximum power output of 500 hp (373 kW; 507 PS), and 525 lb⋅ft (712 N⋅m) of torque. The weight of the engine would also lose as much as 230 kg (507 lb). The chassis would become more rigid and lightweight, losing 36 kg (79 lb). A 6-speed Tremec T56 manual transmission is used to deliver all of the power to the rear wheels.

Three years later after the SRT-10 was unveiled, the coupé version of the Viper would be launched, adapting the same "double-bubble" structure as the GTS from the previous generation. This model would have an increased power output of 510 hp (380 kW; 517 PS), and 535 lb⋅ft (725 N⋅m) of torque. The design of the car takes styling cues from the GTS, with the rear portion of the car adapting the tail shape, and the taillights using a design inspired by the GTS.

Dodge would stop production of the Viper for 2007, in lieu of preparing the new updates for the car for the 2008 model year.

== Performance ==
The SRT-10 can accelerate from 0–60 mph (0–97 km/h) in 3.8 seconds, 0–100 mph (0–161 km/h) in 8.36 seconds, complete the quarter mile in 11.77 seconds at 123.68 mph (199 km/h), and attain a top speed of 189.5 mph (305 km/h). The Viper also has an average slalom speed of 70.4 mph (113 km/h), a skidpad acceleration average of 1.05 g (10.3 m/s^{2}), and a 100–0 mph (161–0 km/h) stopping distance of 274 ft (84 m).

The coupé variant can accelerate from 0–60 mph (0–97 km/h) in 3.7 seconds, 0–100 mph (0–161 km/h) in 8.36 seconds, complete the quarter mile in 11.77 seconds at 123.68 mph (199 km/h), and attain a top speed of 192.6 mph (310 km/h). The coupé has an average slalom speed of 70.4 mph (113 km/h), a skidpad acceleration average of 1.05 g (10.3 m/s^{2}), and a 100–0 mph (161–0 km/h) stopping distance of 274 ft (84 m).
