= ITV4 =

British free-to-air television channel

- Logo used since 15 November 2022
- Country: United Kingdom

Programming
- Language: English
- Picture format: 1080i HDTV (downscaled to 16:9 576i for the SDTV feed)
- Timeshift service: ITV4 +1

Ownership
- Owner: ITV plc
- Sister channels: ITV1; ITV2; ITV3; ITV Quiz

History
- Launched: 1 November 2005; 21 years ago

Links
- Website: www.itv.com

Availability

Terrestrial
- Freeview: Channel 26 (SD); Channel 59 (+1)

Streaming media
- ITVX: Watch live (UK only)
- Sky Go: Watch live (UK only)
- Virgin TV Go: Watch live (UK only); Watch live (+1) (UK only)
- Virgin TV Anywhere: Watch live (Ireland only)

ITV4 is a British free-to-air television channel which first aired on 1 November 2005. It is owned by ITV plc.

The channel focuses primarily on general entertainment programming targeting a male audience, including action series and films, gameshows, reality television, and sports. It is the main linear television outlet for ITV Sport, carrying much of its football, cycling, darts, motorsport, horse racing, rugby, and snooker coverage (with marquee events primarily airing on ITV1).

== History ==
It was expected that ITV4 would replace the existing Men & Motors channel (which was replaced by ITV HD), in the same way Granada Plus was rebranded into ITV3. In April, ITV obtained the physical spectrum to run it on Freeview, having outbid companies such as Disney and Turner Broadcasting. The channel would, however, axe Men & Motors' popular late night softcore block. The channel would also have a generalist profile, as seen with ITV2 (young and female-oriented) and ITV3 (older, upmarket audience), while still aiming at men. It was also expected to timeshare with the CITV channel, which was becoming a viable option after a plan for a joint service with Nickelodeon fell through.

ITV plc stated that the two channels would run alongside each other, forcing the ITV News Channel on Freeview to timeshare with ITV4. ITV replaced the failing News Channel with CITV. Both channels were on Freeview until ITV plc took Men & Motors off Freeview (although it remained on other platforms for some time until April 2010) and replaced it with the live quiz channel ITV Play. Some programming from Men & Motors was transferred to ITV4.

ITV4 was the first channel to use the new on-screen look that was rolled out across the rest of ITV plc's channels on 16 January 2006. Red Bee Media designed the new logos and presentation for the entire corporation that saw the end of the yellow and blue squared look designed for ITV, ITV2 and the cube look for ITV3. An ITV 2005 interim results presentation revealed that an old style logo was designed for the channel but was never used on air. The launch look for ITV4 was the launch pad for the wider corporate revamp, which was conceived by Clare Salmon.

The channel initially broadcast early in the evenings, but had its hours extended to cover daytime programming in February 2008, following previous trials where CITV handed over to ITV4 early in the weekends, closing at 12.30pm instead of the usual 6pm handover.

ITV4 was launched on UPC Ireland in Ireland on 4 January 2010, marking the first time the channel has been officially available in the country. The channel had already been (and remains) available to Irish viewers on free-to-air satellite for some time, but it has not been listed in the Sky electronic programme guide since its removal on 25 January 2006. On 1 April 2011, ITV4 was removed from UPC Ireland along with ITV2 and ITV3 due to the expiry of a carriage agreement between UPC and ITV. UPC Ireland claim that ITV is not in a position to renegotiate the deal because ITV had struck a deal with another channel provider to provide it with exclusive rights to air certain content from the channels. Conversely, UPC Ireland also claims to have been in discussions right up to the last moment in order to continue broadcasting the channels. ITV2, ITV3 and ITV4 were restored to the UPC Ireland line-up on 20 December 2011. Virgin Media One and its sister channel Virgin Media Two already hold carriage agreement to air certain ITV content within the Republic of Ireland, alternatively UTV is available within the Republic. ITV2 is available along with ITV3 and ITV4 within Switzerland, all three channels are available on SwisscomTV and UPC Cablecom. ITV4 is registered to broadcast within the European Union/EEA through ALIA in Luxembourg.

=== Launch ===
ITV4's launch night was on Freeview channel 30. Although it was broadcast on the Astra 2D satellite used by Sky, so users could manually tune it in. It was launched on Sky channel 120, after ITV2 and ITV3 in the listings, on 1 November. Prior to this date, some sporting content was simulcast on Men & Motors in an ITV4 on M&M strand. It officially launched with Real Betis v Chelsea in the UEFA Champions League (Liverpool v Anderlecht was on ITV1 at the same time), the UK premiere of Kojak, and the film Carlito's Way.

== Subsidiary channels ==
=== ITV4 +1 ===
ITV4 +1 (Third logo used since 15 November 2022)

In late October 2008, it was announced that a timeshifted (+1) version of ITV4 would be launched by the end of the year. ITV4 +1 was launched on Sky on 1 December 2008, on Freesat on 9 December 2008 and on Virgin Media on 25 March 2010. It was delisted from Sky on 11 January 2011, due to the launch of ITV1 +1 taking up space on the EPG; the channel is still available on Freesat and Virgin. The channel was restored on 1 June 2012.

=== ITV4 HD ===
ITV4 HD (Third logo used since 15 November 2022)

A high-definition simulcast of ITV4, ITV4 HD, was launched on 15 November 2010 alongside the sister channel, ITV3 HD on Sky. The channel was initially available through Sky's pay subscription service in a non-exclusive deal, before being added to Virgin Media's service on 14 March 2013. ITV4 HD's high definition content includes films, and sports events which currently include British Touring Car Championship, Tour de France, horse racing, snooker and darts (including the UK Open and the Players Championship Finals) as well as highlights of other sporting events and content from the ITV Sport archives.

On 1 November 2022, in the lead up to the launch of ITVX and as part of the 18th anniversary of ITV3 and 17th anniversary of ITV4, the encryption was dropped on ITV4 HD at around 11am that day and so became free to air. Later that day, Freesat data had been added to ITV4 HD, indicating that the channel will be made available on Freesat soon. On 8 November 2022 the HD version replaced the SD version on Freesat channel 117. In January 2023, As part of a EPG clean up for HD Channels, Virgin Media moved ITV4 HD from channel 176 to channel 118 to make the channel free to all Virgin Customers.

== Branding ==
=== 2013 rebranding ===
In line with the corporate rebranding of ITV, ITV4 received a new look on 14 January 2013. The channel received a "slate-grey" logo and became the "home of sport and cult classics". Channel promotion includes pub factoids and idents featuring viewer nominated "dreams come true".

=== 2022 rebranding ===
ITV4 received its first revamp in nine years in November 2022 as part of a redesign of all of ITV's main channels, being carried out in tandem with the launch of the streaming service ITVX. The idents launched on 15 November 2022. The logo is now coloured green and uses idents that are cross-used across ITV1, ITV2, ITV3, and ITVBe with different views which reflect the channel's image and programming output.

=== Former logos ===
ITV4 (First logo used from 1 November 2005 to 13 January 2013)

ITV4 HD (First logo used from 15 November 2010 to 13 January 2013)

ITV4 (Second logo used from 14 January 2013 to 15 November 2022)

== Programming ==
=== Current programming ===
- The 1% Club
- AEW Dynamite
- AEW Collision
- American Pickers
- Auf Wiedersehen, Pet
- Auto Mundial
- The Avengers
- Ax Men
- Bear's Mission with...
- Beat the Chasers
- Benidorm
- The Big Fish Off
- The Big Match Revisited
- Boon
- Britain's Busiest Motorway
- British Touring Car Championship
- Cadfael
- The Car Chasers
- Car Crash Global: Caught on Camera
- The Car Years
- Cash Cowboys
- The Champions
- The Chase Celebrity Special
- Darts (Including World Series of Darts, World Masters, UK Open, European Championship, Players Championship and World Series of Darts Finals).
- Dempsey and Makepeace
- Duck Dynasty
- Extreme Salvage Squad
- FA Cup
- Premiership Rugby
- Goodwood Revival
- Gordon, Gino and Fred: Road Trip
- Hell's Kitchen
- Hornblower
- Ice Road Truckers
- Ironside
- ITV Racing
- ITV Sport Stories
- Junk & Disorderly
- Jeremy Wade's Mighty Rivers
- Kojak
- Lovecars: On the Road
- Magnum, P.I.
- Minder
- The Motorbike Show
- Monster Carp
- Made in Britain
- Only When I Laugh
- Pawn Stars
- Sapphire & Steel
- Snooker (Tournaments Include British Open, Champions of Champions, World Grand Prix, Players Championship and Tour Championship).
- The Prisoner
- The Professionals
- The Protectors
- Tour de France
- Randall and Hopkirk (Deceased)
- River Monsters
- Robin of Sherwood
- The Saint
- Sharpe
- Sherlock Holmes
- The Sweeney
- Tenable
- When English Football Ruled Europe
- Who Wants to Be a Millionaire?
- World of Sport ('Best of..' compilations)

=== Former programming ===
- AEW Rampage
- Benidorm
- Bad Move
- Columbo
- Dollhouse
- Fierce
- Football Genius (2018)
- Fifth Gear
- Grandma Jane's Garden Adventures
- Hell on Wheels
- Homicide: Life on the Street
- It's Not Rocket Science
- Jericho
- LAPD: Life On the Beat
- Martial Law
- Miami Vice
- Millennium
- Mr. Bean (moved to ITV3)
- The New Avengers
- Nitro Circus
- Quincy, M.E.
- Police Camera Action!
- Sanctuary
- Speed Freaks (2019)
- Space Precinct
- Storage Wars
- Storage Wars: New York
- Storage Wars: Texas
- Take the Tower (2018)
- UFO
- Used Car Roadshow

=== Sports coverage ===
Before ITV4's launch in 2005, ITV's digital sports coverage was on ITV2, but after its launch all sports coverage moved to ITV4. In its first week, it had coverage of the aforementioned Real Betis v Chelsea game in the UEFA Champions League, and also had coverage of Middlesbrough v Dnipro Dnipropetrovsk in the UEFA Cup on the Thursday, and Amir Khan's fight against Steve Gethin from the Braehead Arena in Glasgow on the Saturday.

==== Current coverage ====
Football

- FA Cup Live & Replays (2008–2014 & 2022–present)
- England Women's Team Qualifiers & Friendlies (2021–present)
- FIFA World Cup (2006–present: Extra group games)
- UEFA European Championship (2008–present: Extra group games)
- EFL Championship, League One, League Two & EFL Cup Highlights (2022–present: highlights on ITV4 and repeated on ITV1)

Cycling

- Tour de France (from 2002 until at least 2019, shared with Eurosport)
- Tour de Yorkshire
- Vuelta a España (2011–present)
- Critérium du Dauphiné
- Critérium International
- Liège–Bastogne–Liège
- Paris–Roubaix
- Tour Series cycling
- Tour of Britain
- Revolution Series

Rugby union

- Women's Rugby World Cup
- Under 20s Rugby World Cup
- Rugby World Cup
- Aviva Premiership Highlights (2008–2017 & 2022–present: highlights on itv4 and repeated on itv)
- Aviva Premiership Live Coverage including Premiership Final (2022–present)

Horse racing

- Weekly Saturday Afternoon Horse Racing, 40 days of big meetings such as Grand National on ITV with 60 days of horse racing on ITV4 (2017–present)

Motorsport

- Isle of Man TT (from 2009–present)
- British Touring Car Championship (from 2005–present, live until 2026 with highlights on ITV)
- British Superbikes (live from 2005 to 2007 and highlights from 2009–present, live on British Eurosport)
- Superbike World Championship (highlights from 2016–present, live on British Eurosport)
- World Rally Championship (highlights from 2006–2008, 2013–2015, 2020-present)
- Motorsport UK (highlights from 2005–present)
- Goodwood Festival of Speed (highlights on ITV, shared with Sky Sports F1)
- BRDC Formula 3 Highlights
- Formula E (2014-2016, from 2024-present, live on ITVX, with 9 races live on ITV4)

Darts

- European Championship (2008, 2011, 2013–present)
- Players Championship Finals (2009–2010, 2011–present)
- PDC World Masters (2013–present: PDC tournament, not to be confused with the BDO Winmau World Masters with ITV covered from 1974 to 1988)
- UK Open (2014–present, previously on Sky Sports)
- World Series of Darts Finals (2015–present)
- World Series of Darts (6 tournaments with live or delayed coverage on ITV4 from 2015–present)

Snooker

- Champion of Champions (2013–present)
- World Grand Prix (2015–present)
- Players Championship Grand Finals (2016–present)

Boxing

- The Big Fight Live (2005–2010 & 2017–present, selected fights on ITV4 with others on ITV Box Office)
- Premier Boxing Champions (2019–present, selected fights on ITV4 and more fights on ITV Box Office)

Wrestling

- AEW Dynamite (2019–present, full broadcast on ITV4 on Friday nights, and repeats on Saturday nights)
- AEW Collision (2023–present, broadcast on ITV4 on Tuesday nights, and repeats on Wednesday nights)

==== Former coverage ====
Football

- International Friendlies, Qualifiers and Play-Offs (2010–2018, from 2014 to 2018 at least one qualifier live per matchday not involving a UK Home Nation, shared with Sky Sports)
- Scotland, Wales & Northern Ireland National Team Highlights (2014–2018, live on Sky Sports and highlights on BBC NI, BBC Scotland & BBC Wales)
- England National Team Highlights and Re-runs (2008–present, Nations League and in-season friendlies live, plus highlights also on Sky Sports)
- UEFA Champions League (2nd exclusive match on ITV4 from 2005 to 2008 and delayed matches and highlights from 2008 to 2018, now on TNT Sports and the BBC)
- UEFA Europa League (highlights from 2015 to 2018, live on TNT Sports)
- UEFA Super Cup Highlights (2008–2014, on ITV4 if a British club is involved & highlights from 2015 to 2018)
- FA Cup Replays (2009–2010, now on BBC Sport and TNT Sports)
- FA Community Shield Highlights (2008–2014, now on TNT Sports & BBC Sport)
- FA Trophy Final (2009)
- 2006 FIFA World Cup (live and highlights)
- Euro 2008 (live and highlights)
- 2010 FIFA World Cup (live and highlights)
- Euro 2012 (live and highlights)
- World Cup (Brazil 2014) (live and highlights, all major tournaments alongside BBC Sport)
- European Championships (France 2016) (live on BBC Sport & ITV Sport, selected games & highlights on ITV4)
- African Cup of Nations (2012–2015, live coverage & highlights. Now on Eurosport)
- Bundesliga (weekly highlights from 2012 to 2017)
- La Liga (2019)
- Arnold Clark Cup (2022–2023)

Boat Race

- The Boat Race (highlights from 2006 to 2009, now on Channel 4)

Boxing

- Frank Warren fights (2006–2008, now on TNT Sports)
- Hennessey fights (2008–2010, moved to Channel 5)
- Undercard of main fights (usually shown on ITV4 with main event on ITV with all fights from 2008 to 2010 on ITV4)
- Carl Frampton Live: Undercard live on ITV4, Frampton Live on ITV & highlights on ITV4

Cricket

- Ashes Cricket (highlights from 2010 to 2011, now on TNT Sports)
- IPL (2010–2014, now on Sky Sports Cricket)
- Cricket World Cup Highlights (2015, live on Sky Sports with highlights on ITV & ITV4)

Snooker

- Power Snooker (2010–2011)
- World Open (2013)
- Snooker Shoot Out (2016–2018, now on TNT Sports)

Darts

- Grand Slam of Darts (2007–2010, now on Sky Sports)

Motorsport

- Formula One (highlights and re-runs from 2006 to 2008, now on Channel 4 and Sky Sports F1)
- GP2 Series (live and highlights from 2006 to 2008, now on Sky Sports F1)
- MotoGP (2 races live on ITV1 and ITV4 and highlights of all races from 2014 to 2016, 2021–2024)
- DTM (highlights)

Cycling

- Tour of California (2011)
- Tour de France (now on TNT Sports and Channel 5)

Rugby Union

- LV Cup Highlights (2010–2017, live on Sky Sports)
- Heineken Cup Highlights (2010–2014, live on Sky Sports, which ended when it became European Champions Cup)

Tennis

- Masters Tennis from the Royal Albert Hall (2010–2014)
- French Open (2012–2021, now on TNT Sports)

Wrestling

- AEW Rampage (2021–2024, broadcast on ITV4 on Tuesday nights, and repeats on ITV1 on Thursday nights)
