= Dodge Tomahawk =

Concept vehicle

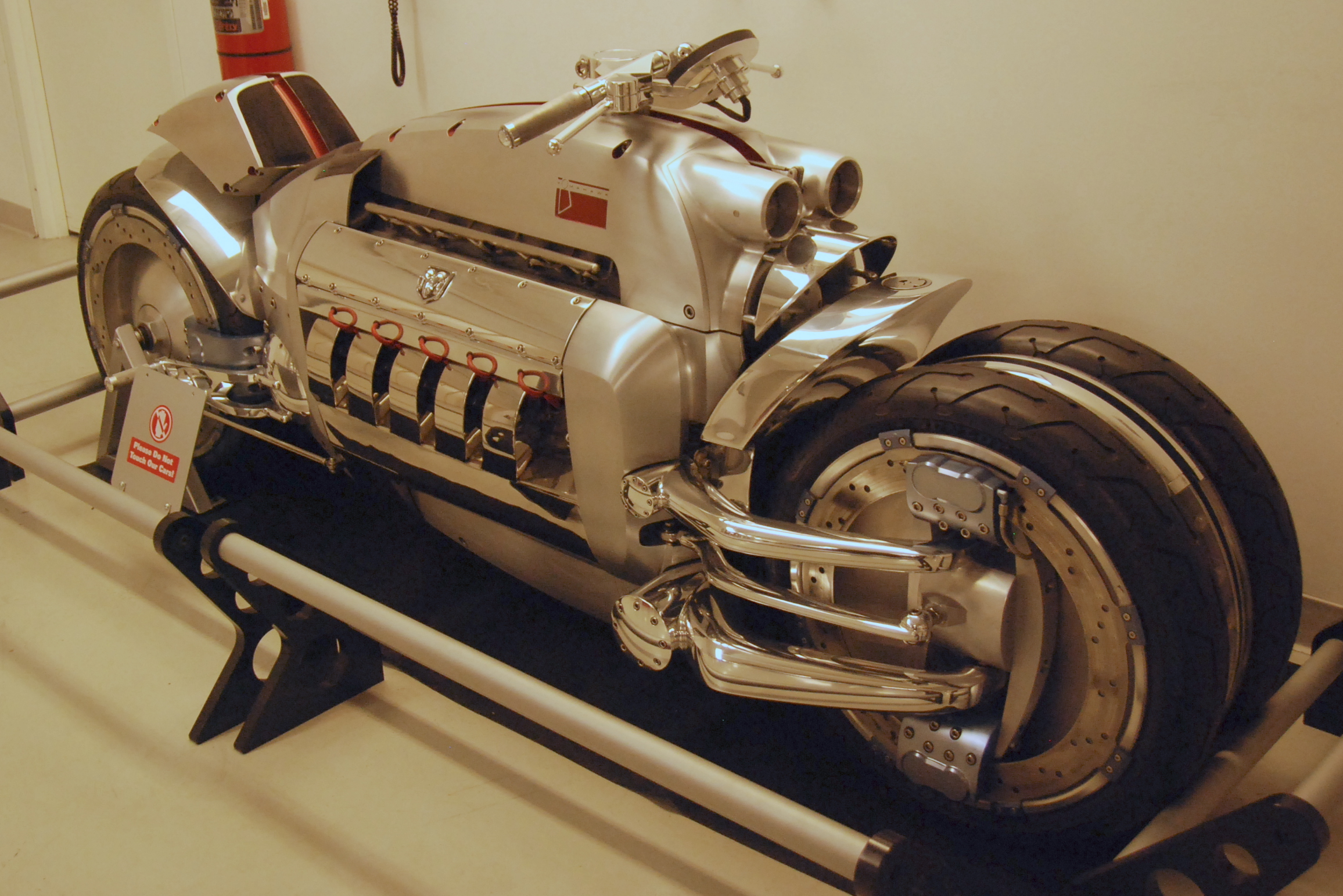
- Manufacturer: Dodge
- Parent company: DaimlerChrysler AG
- Production: 10 units total, 2003–2006
- Class: Concept vehicle, limited production
- Engine: 8.3 L (506.5 cu in) 20-valve 90° Viper V-10
- Power: 500 hp (370 kW) @ 5,600 rpm (claimed) (45 kW:L power:displacement ratio)
- Torque: 525 lb⋅ft (712 N⋅m)
- Transmission: 2-speed manual
- Suspension: Front: Horizontal double fork
- Brakes: Front: 2×16 piston discs, Rear: 8 piston disc
- Tires: Front (2): 20"×4", Rear (2): 20"×5"
- Wheelbase: 76 in (1,900 mm)
- Dimensions: L: 102 in (2,600 mm); W: 27.7 in (700 mm); H: 36.9 in (940 mm)
- Seat height: 29 in (740 mm)
- Weight: 1,500 lb (680 kg) (claimed) (wet)
- Fuel capacity: 3.35 US gal (12.7 L; 2.79 imp gal)

The Dodge Tomahawk was a non-street legal vehicle introduced in 2004 by Dodge at the North American International Auto Show, as a one-off concept, and later that year, DaimlerChrysler announced they would sell hand-built reproductions on order. The Tomahawk attracted significant press and industry attention for its striking design, its outsize-displacement, 10-cylinder car engine, and its four close-coupled wheels, which give it a motorcycle-like appearance. Experts disagreed on whether it is a true motorcycle. The retro-Art Deco design's central visual element is the 500-horsepower (370 kW), 8.3-litre (510 cu in) V10 SRT10 engine from the Dodge Viper sports car. The Tomahawk's two front and two rear wheels are sprung independently, which would allow it to lean into corners and countersteer like a motorcycle.

Dodge press releases and spokespeople gave various hypothetical top speeds ranging from 300 mph (480 km/h) to as high as 420 mph (680 km/h), which analysts thought were probably calculated with horsepower and final drive ratio alone, without accounting for drag, rolling resistance, and stability. These estimates, and the more conservative 250 mph (400 km/h) a designer suggested could be possible, were debunked as implausible, or physically impossible, by the motorcycling and automotive media. No independent road tests of the Tomahawk have ever been published, and the company said that in internal testing it was never ridden above 100 mph (160 km/h). The Tomahawk was sold through the Neiman Marcus catalog at a price of US$555,000, and as many as nine are thought to have been sold. As they were not street legal, Dodge said the reproductions were "automotive sculpture", "intended for display only" not fully operational.

Industry observers said the Tomahawk was a resounding success at one-upping rivals and taking the trade show spotlight, and was a branding and marketing coup, generating media buzz and sending the message that Chrysler was a bold, ambitious company, unafraid to take risks.

== Inception ==
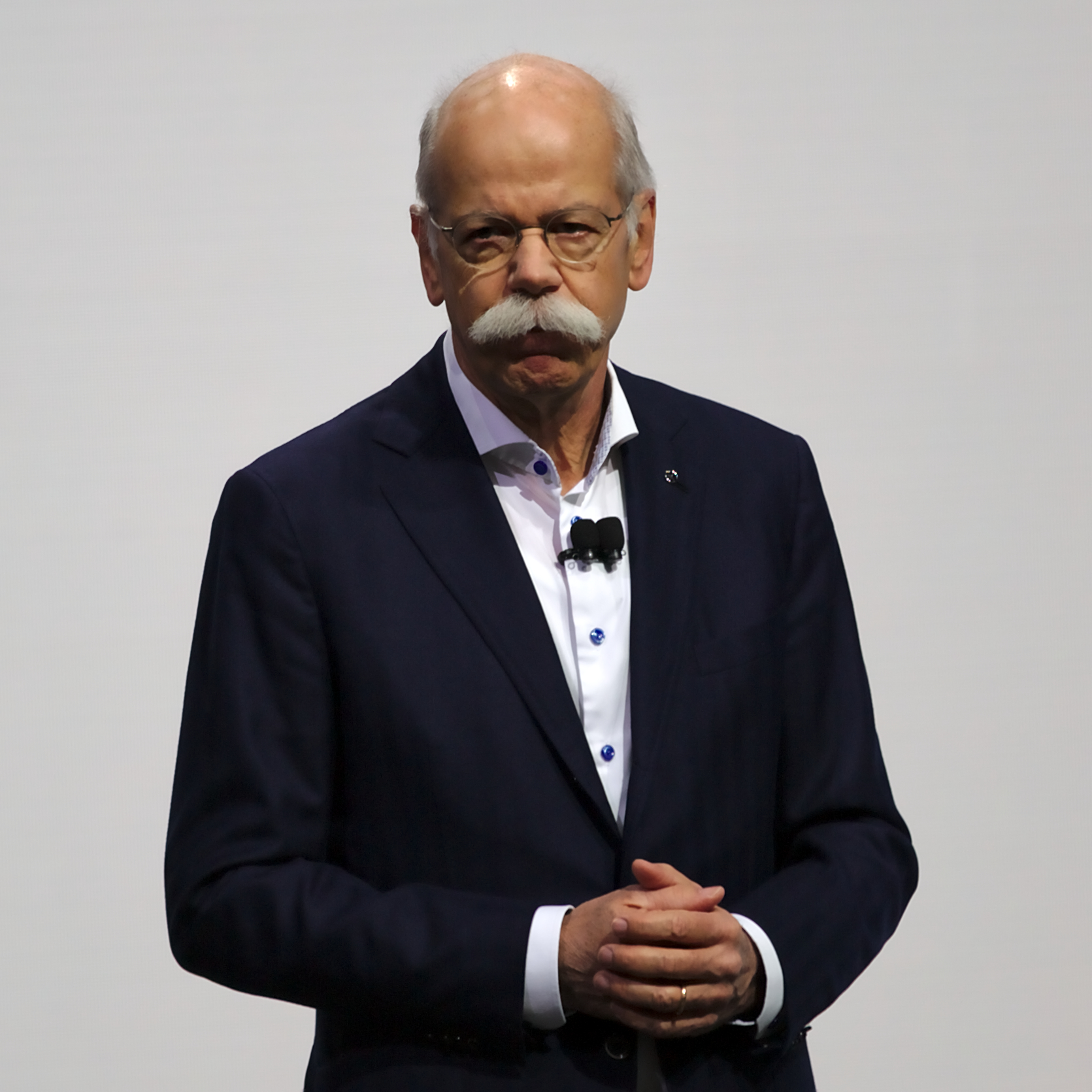
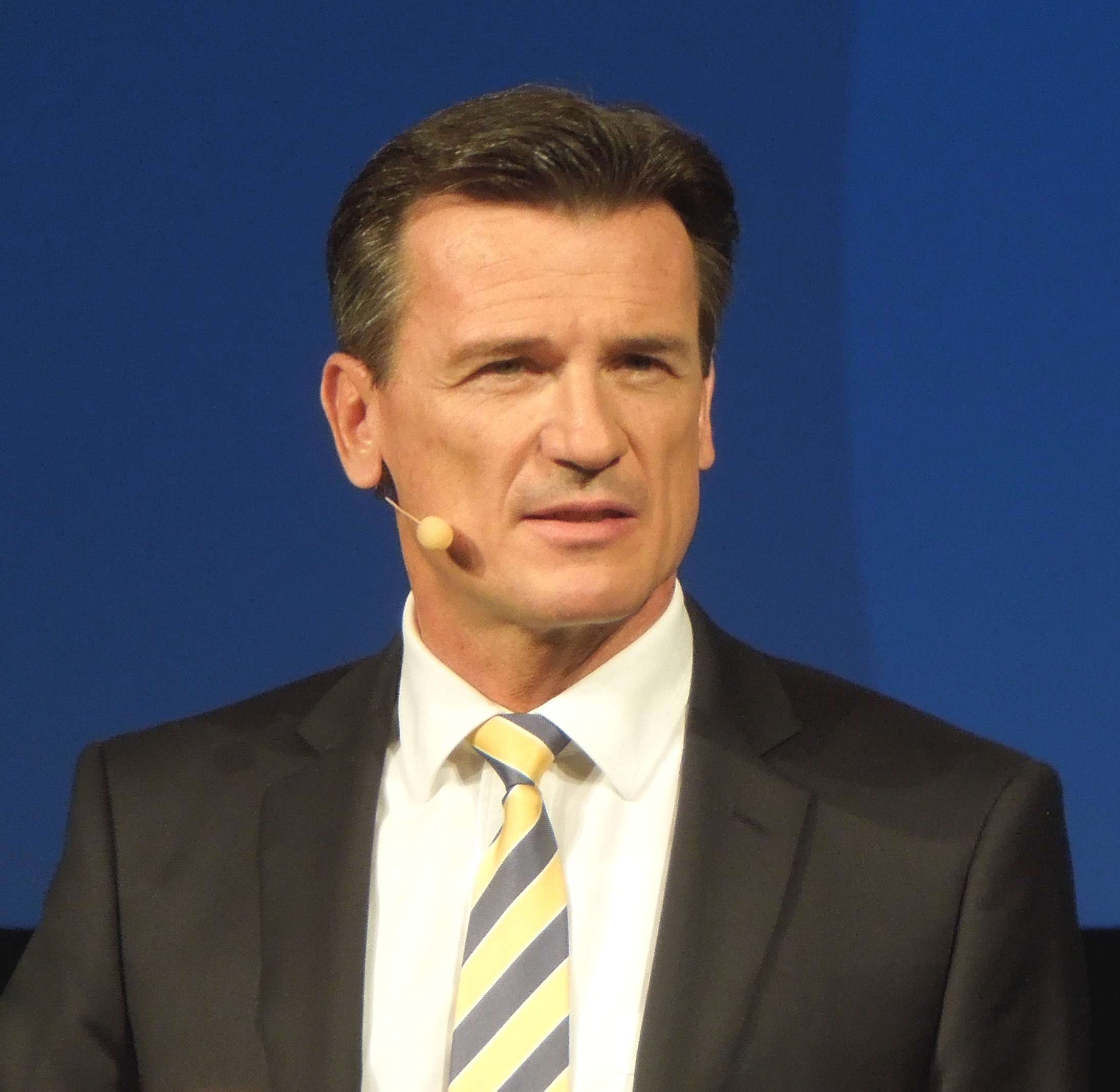
Chrysler Group CEO, Dieter Zetsche (top) and COO, Wolfgang Bernhard

The idea for a Viper-engined motorcycle started with two lower-level Chrysler Group employees, Bob Schroeder, a design office modeler and motorcycle rider, and Dave Chyz, vehicle build specialist and drag racer. According to designer Mark Walters, the question asked was, "What if we had a Viper engine and a Champion chassis? Something like a Boss Hoss", resulting in an engine displacement five times a typical Harley-Davidson. The low-volume Boss Hoss motorcycle is built around a 5.7 L (350 cu in) Chevrolet V8, and the largest-displacement mass-produced motorcycle is the 2.3 L (140 cu in) Triumph Rocket III, neither anywhere close to the 8.3-litre (510 cu in) Viper engine. The only motorcycle with a displacement in the Tomahawk's league uses the same V-10 car engine, the one-off 2009 Millyard Viper V10, a bike created to rival the Tomahawk after Allen Millyard was underwhelmed by a Tomahawk speed run at the Goodwood Festival of Speed in the UK.

Schroeder and Chyz took the proposal to Senior Vice President of Design Trevor Creed, who initially said, "we don't build bikes" but still allowed some design sketches to be created, which were "mind blowing" enough to bring Creed on board. They eventually took the idea to Freeman Thomas, DaimlerChrysler VP of advanced design, who assigned Mark Walters to join the effort. Thomas suggested using two front and rear wheels because a single wheel would look thin next to the unusually wide engine, inspired by the four-wheeled light cycles in the film Tron. Walters anticipated howls from bikers that this would make it not a motorcycle, but he felt uniqueness was more important, and imagined the appearance with only a single wheel in front of and behind the engine would have been visually unbalanced, saying he would like to see it made that way for comparison. By the spring of 2002, Walters had prepared a full scale design presentation, with sketches along a 20 ft (6.1 m) wall and a borrowed Viper engine resting on an engine stand with two wheels placed fore and aft as a visual aid. This was presented to Chrysler Group COO, Wolfgang Bernhard, and CEO, Dieter Zetsche, who gave their immediate approval.

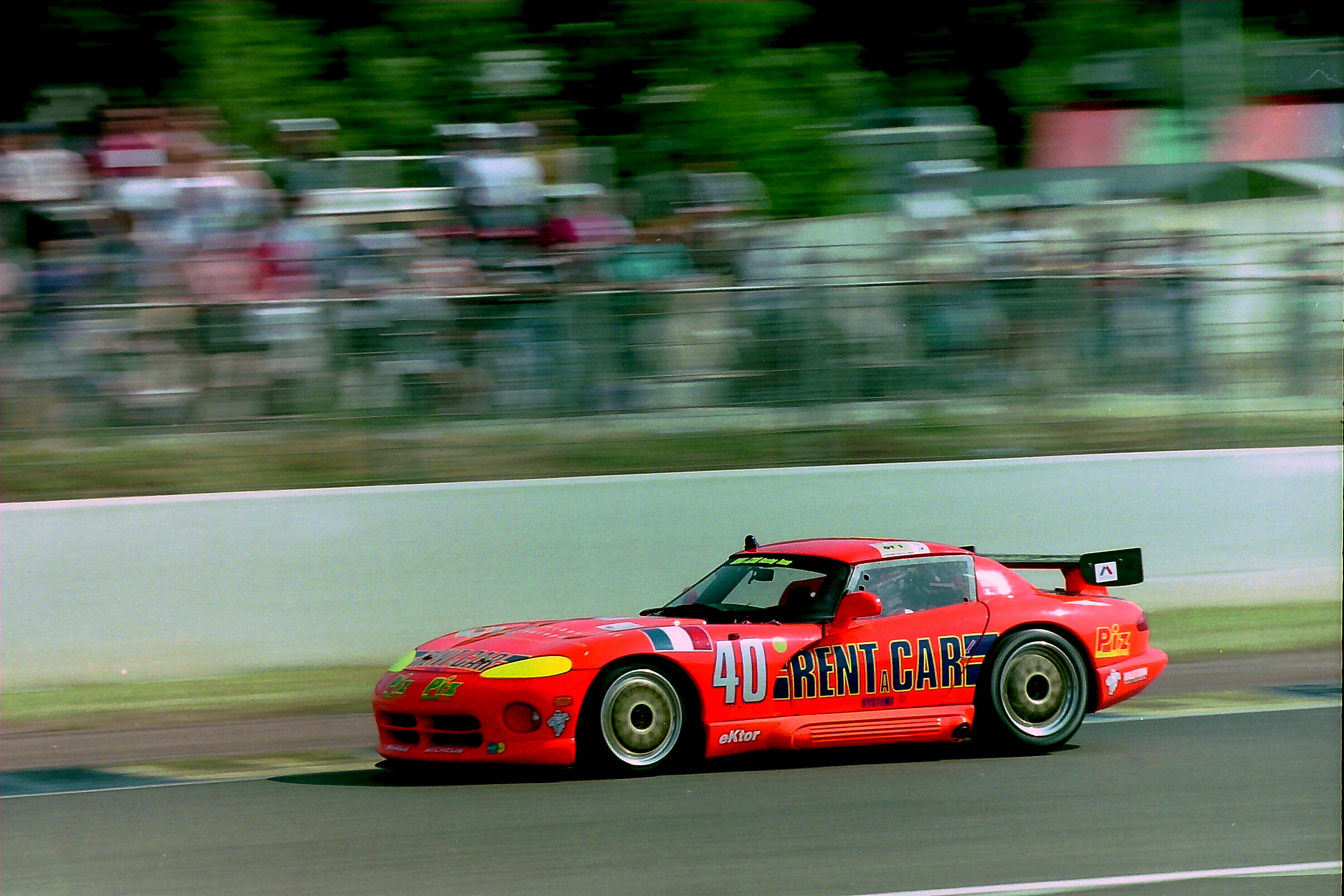
Dodge Viper RT/10 racing at Le Mans 1994

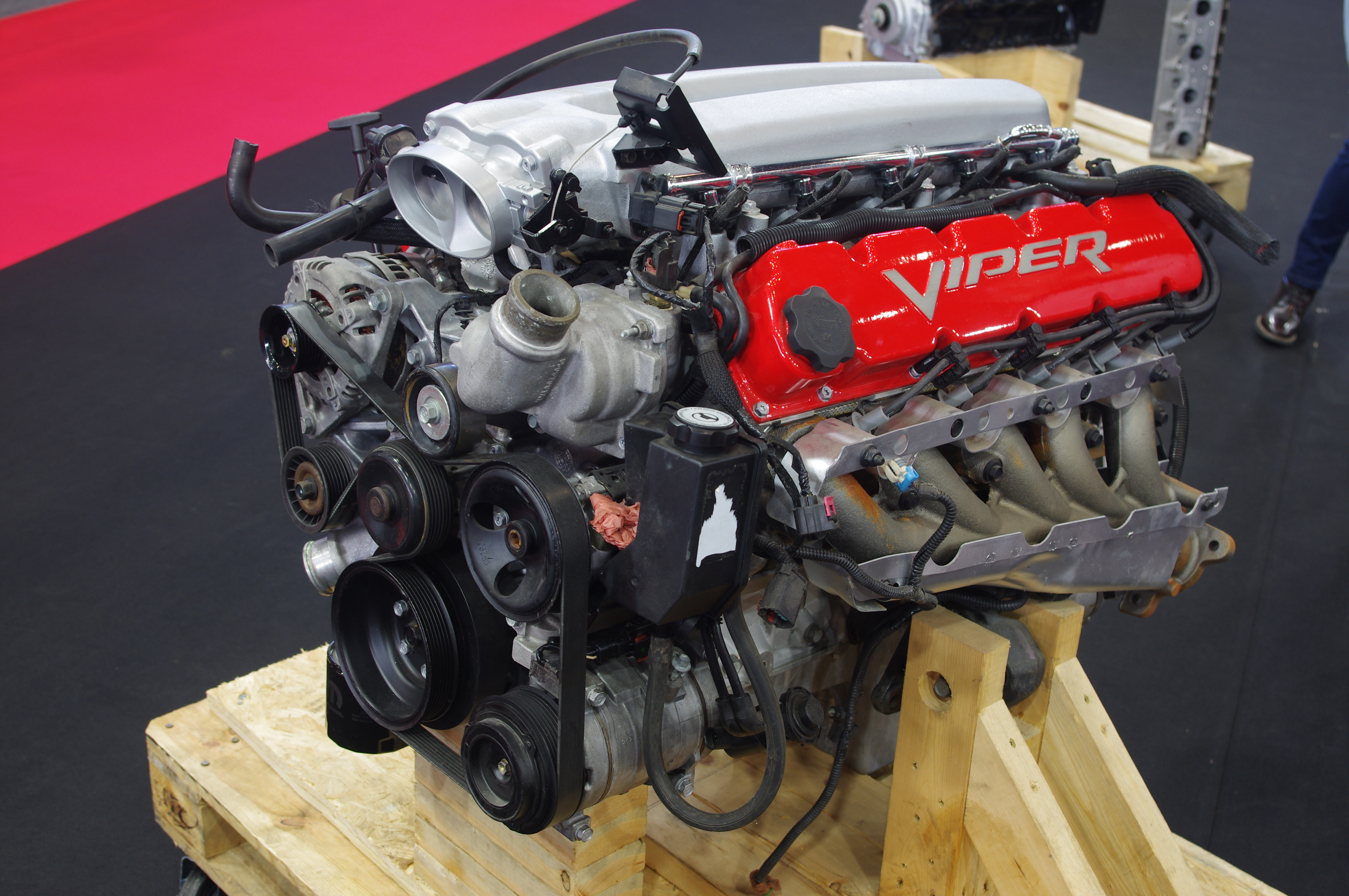
8.3-litre (510 cu in) V10 SRT10 engine

== Design ==
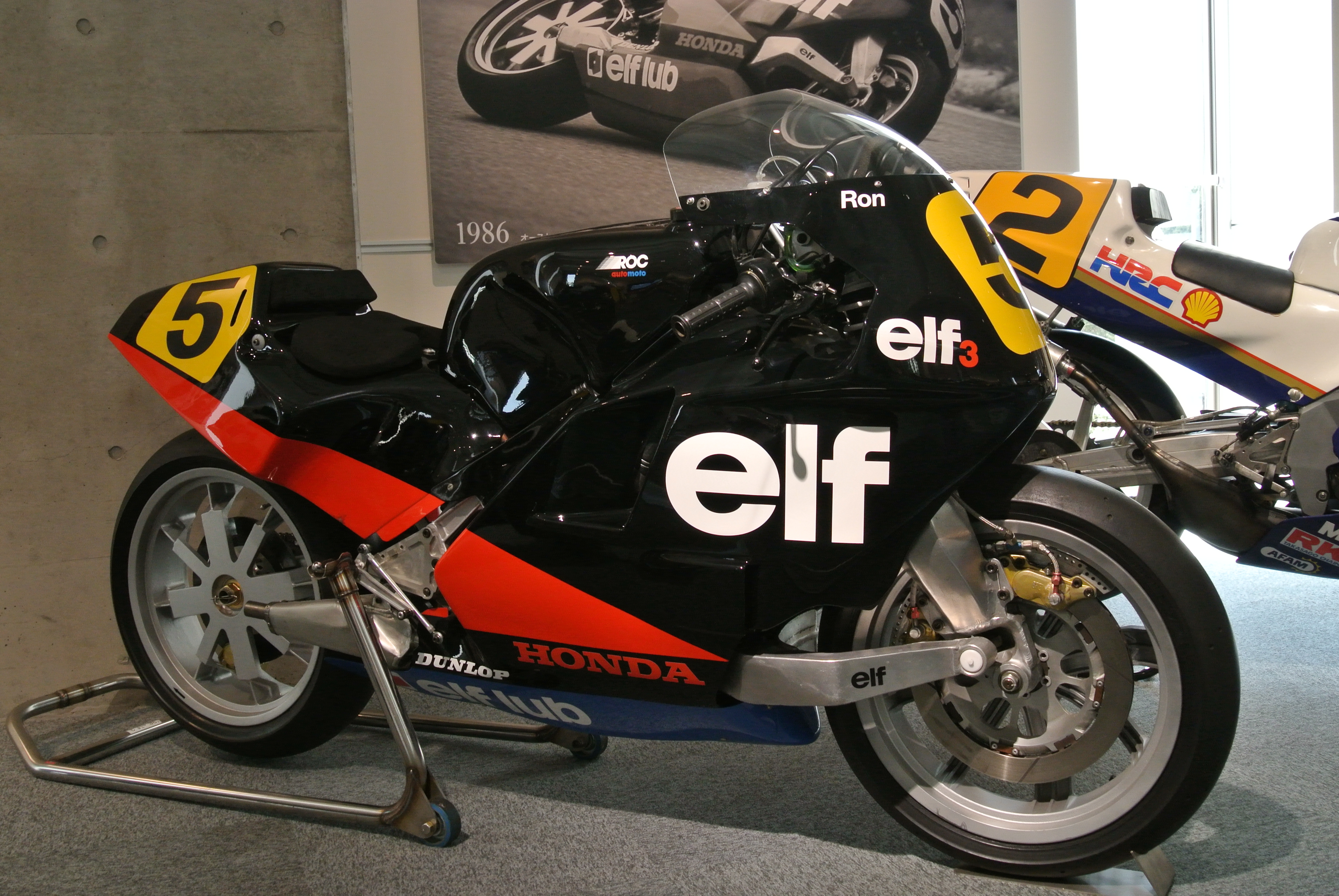
1986 Elf 3 Honda with hub-center steering, in the Honda Collection Hall

The design was the work of Chrysler staff designer Mark Walters, who built the vehicle around the Dodge Viper 8.3-litre (510 cu in) V-10 engine. Once approved by Bernhard and Zetsche to build not just a full-scale mockup, but a running, workable concept vehicle, the design and fabrication process took six months. The engineering, as well as the fabrication, was outsourced to RM Motorsports, a Wixom, Michigan, specialty shop that fabricates one-of-a-kind parts for rare and vintage race cars. Walters said Kirt Bennett at RM handled the task of making Walters' sketches a physical reality that was mechanically sound. Walters' early sketches had a front suspension that looked something like an Elf-Honda racing motorcycle's hub-center steering, from which RM designed a new, patented front- and rear-swingarm suspension that allows both parallel wheels to lean together, keeping all four in contact with the ground and allowing countersteering. The Tomahawk was intended, unlike many concept vehicles, to be a "functional runner" that "had to work" as well as have a finished appearance, since the mechanical parts would be exposed to view.

The V-10 engine needed several design changes. To position the engine lower to the ground, the lubrication system was changed from wet sump to a dry sump type, moving the under-engine oil sump to a tank located in front of and to the left of the engine. The car-style single radiator out in front of the engine was changed to two smaller radiators and fitted into the V-shaped space above the engine, where cooling air is force-fed using a belt-driven fan sourced from a Porsche 911.

=== Suspension ===
The Tomahawk has an independent suspension on all four wheels designed to allow the rider to countersteer and lean into turns like a tilting three-wheeler. There is a hub-center steering style swingarm connected to the outboard side of each of the two front wheels, with a steering link connected to the handlebar shaft. There is very little lock-to-lock steering range, only about 20° on either side of center, so the turning radius of the Tomahawk is large; "only a little tighter than an SR-71", said Motorcyclist's Jeff Karr. A low center of gravity, accomplished by situating the engine as low to ground as possible, is intended to provide greater control at low speeds, and a low saddle allows riders to place both feet on the ground when stopped, for greater stability. The two rear wheels also each have an independent swingarm, but on the inboard side, along with an inboard chain drive for each wheel. The rider can engage a rear suspension lock, which hydraulically holds the two wheels' relative positions, letting the vehicle stand on its own, without using a side stand.

According to computer imaging, the suspension would allow a lean of up to 45° with all four wheels maintaining contact with the ground before one of the swingarms contacted the ground, although attempting to actually corner at such extreme angles is not safe given the Tomahawk's 1,500 lb (680 kg) weight. Test rides for the purpose of photographing the Tomahawk in action revealed that there were still stability issues to be worked out, given that it rides, "like two motorcycles riding in ultraclose formation, coupled with the weight of three and the horsepower of four," in Karr's words, meaning that, "some disagreement is inevitable." RM Motorsports's Bud Bennett said the 45° lean system worked well and was in fact stable, quashing rumors that any test riders had been thrown from the Tomahawk, and that the only issue was the original design's limited 18° handlebar turning radius, making sharp turns impossible. In 2003, RM Motorsports had been working on designs for versions with wider handlebars allowing more control, and two or three wheels instead of four, making a street-legal Tomahawk conceivable. Bud Bennett said that, at RM, they thought the narrower, limited-range handlebars and unnecessary two front wheels instead of one would not function well, but at the time the design was "just a concept" with no anticipated customer demand, and as a concept vehicle, the Tomahawk did "everything it was supposed to do, which is to push the Dodge name and to celebrate the Viper engine."

== Fabrication ==
Bennett's team at RM custom-milled the Tomahawk components from blocks of aluminum. Under the seat are two alloy pieces that began as 750 lb (340 kg) billets that are machined down to 25 lb (11 kg) each, and polished to a mirror finish. Details like hand levers and the twistgrip use needle and ball bearings.

== Detroit Auto Show debut ==
The Tomahawk debuted at what Automobile Magazine called the high point of a period of increasing extravagance at the Cobo Hall Detroit Auto Show (officially the North American International Auto Show) that began with the expansion of the show in 1986–1987, leading to the splashy debuts of ever larger and more powerful cars and trucks, such as the Hummer H2 in 2000 and the Ford GT40 in 2002. Newsweek described the period as a "horsepower arms race".

The 2003 show had the largest ever attendance, 810,699, and the limits of concept excess were pushed further with the 7.0L V-10 Ford 427 Concept, which had a V-8 hastily expanded to 10 cylinders in response to rumors that Cadillac was going to show a V-10, only to be outdone when the rumored V-10 turned out to be the Cadillac Sixteen, with a claimed 1,000 hp (750 kW) V16 that could shut down 8 or 12 cylinders at a time to save fuel. Yet even these monsters would be upstaged by an even more unexpected debut, Dodge's V-10 motorcycle, unveiled the day after the Sixteen. In response, GM executive Bob Lutz, who himself had helped conceive the Viper in 1988 when he was at Chrysler, was asked where his 1,000 hp V-16 motorcycle was, and he answered, in the wry spirit of the question, that he had none, pounding the table and saying, "Rats, outmaneuvered by Chrysler again!"

AutoWeek named the Ford 427 "Best Concept" and the Cadillac V-16 "Best in Show" for 2003, and the editors said they wished they had an award for "Best Automotive Sculpture" to give to the unexpected motorcycle they found so likable. The jury of 35 journalists of the North American Concept Vehicle of the Year chose the General Motors Hy-wire over the Tomahawk for the 2003 Specialty Concept Vehicle of the Year award. The Tomahawk was remembered in 2014 by Automotive News as one of the "10 Most Memorable World Debuts". In the years after the Tomahawk made its high-profile entrance, the Detroit Auto Show became more modest in scale, and the automakers' battle to outdo each other with boundary-breaking dream cars faded in the years leading up to the 2008 auto industry crisis, and the more cautious recovery that followed.

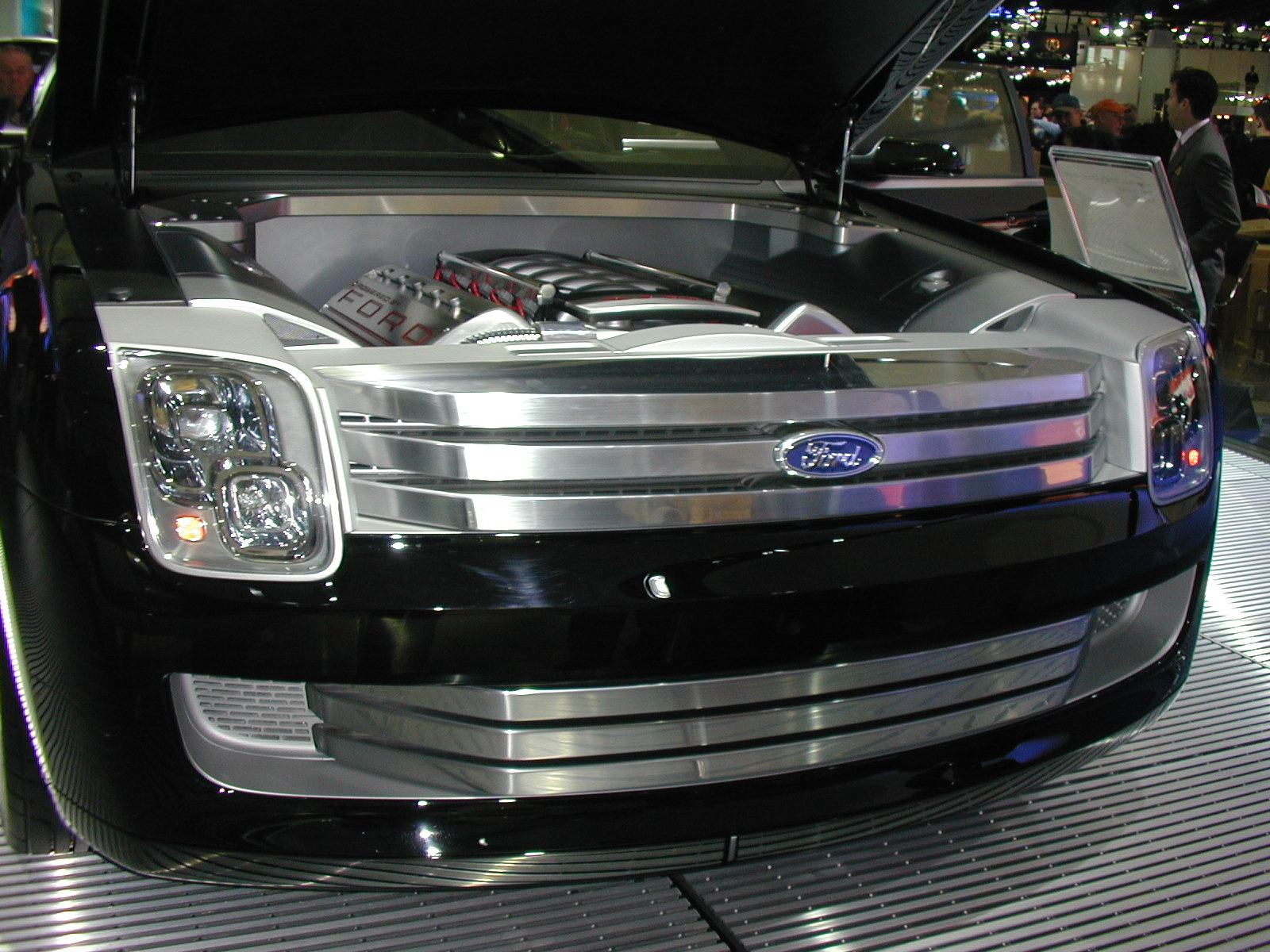
Ford 427 Concept, AutoWeek's "Best Concept"

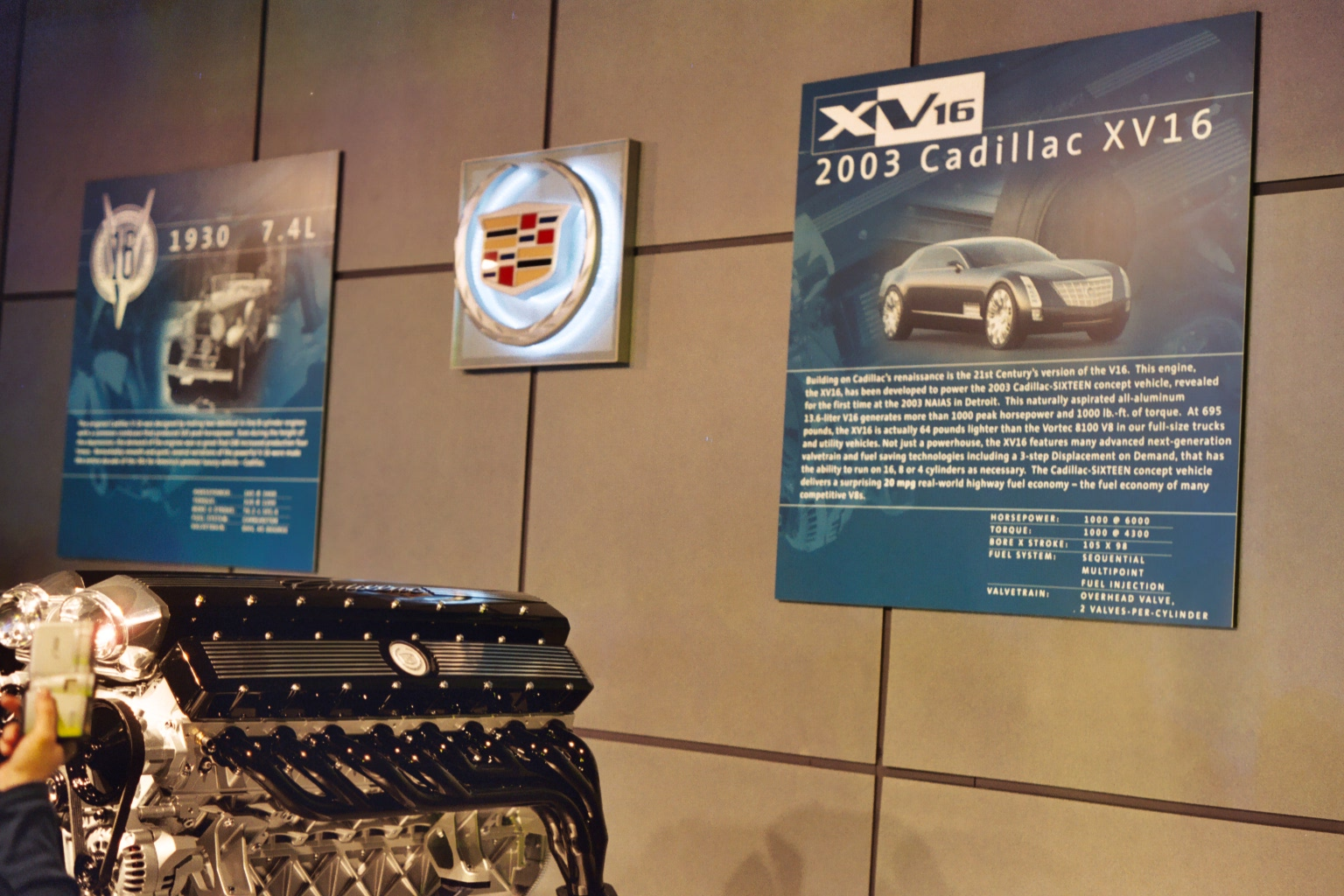
Engine display of Cadillac Sixteen, AutoWeek's "Best in Show"

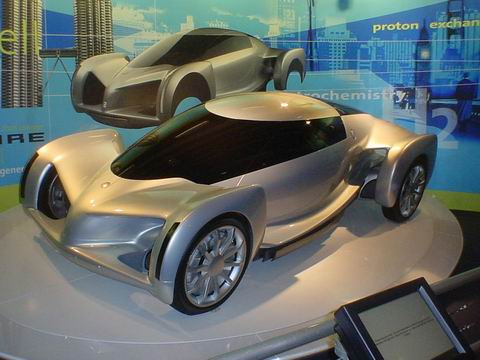
General Motors Hy-wire, 2003 "North American Concept Vehicle of the Year"

== Performance claims ==
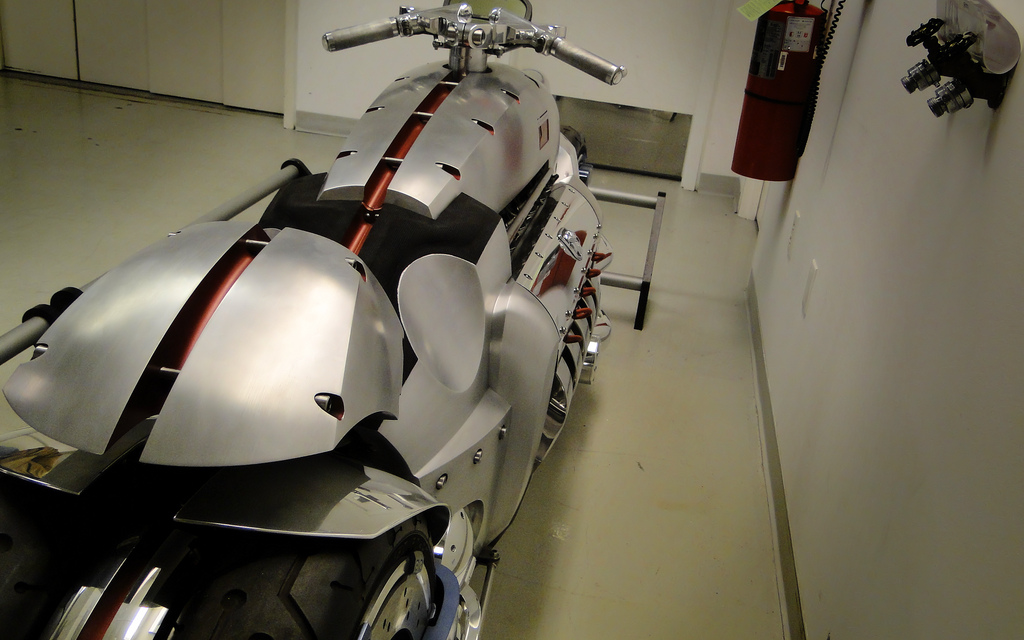
Stainless steel rear cowl and top of Tomahawk, with handlebars connected to a vertical stalk. At the Walter P. Chrysler Museum, Michigan.

As introduced in 2003, the one-of-a-kind Tomahawk was operational and road-ready, but not fully road-tested, and acceleration and top speed were not confirmed; Dodge described the vehicle both as "automotive sculpture", intended for display only, while also saying it was "rideable". DaimlerChrysler spokespeople declined Popular Science's requests to test the Tomahawk's performance, or to speak to the company's test riders, or to share those riders' riding impressions.

=== Top speed ===
Speculation about the Tomahawk's top speed came from the media, and within DaimlerChrysler. One Dodge representative said, "If a 3,400-pound Viper goes 190, this'll go 400, easy." Senior designer Walters, who was in charge of the Tomahawk project, said he did not believe published speeds of 400 mph were possible, noting that the bike was geared for acceleration, and if geared for speed, 250 mph (400 km/h) would be within reach. A real-world speed run of the Millyard Viper V10 achieved 207 mph (333 km/h) with the same 500 hp (370 kW) as the Tomahawk.

Car and Driver, though enthusiastic over "arguably the oddest, coolest, most over-the-top concept ever", expressed "doubt that anyone has actually tried" reaching 60 mph in 2.5 seconds, "or its estimated top speed of 300-plus mph." Phil Patton of The New York Times wrote, "In theory, the Tomahawk can blast from a standing start to 60 miles an hour in two and a half seconds and reach 300 miles an hour. In practice, since Evel Knievel retired, it's hard to imagine anyone willing to prove it." Cycle World's John Phillips derided the top speed claims by saying that at the Detroit Auto Show, "Cadillac unveiled its own paean to one-upmanship a mere 50 yards away—a luxo sedan with a V-16 [the Cadillac Sixteen] producing 1000 bhp. Twice the Tomahawk's output. Which means—at least by Dodge's amusingly convoluted logic—that Caddy's engine could propel the bike to 800 mph."

=== Dodge's changing claims ===
Popular Science said Dodge initially announced the top speed of the Tomahawk was estimated at a theoretical speed of 420 mph (680 km/h), but later revised this downward to 300 mph (480 km/h), and spokesmen did not answer questions on how this estimate was calculated. Motorcycle Consumer News reported that the two conflicting figures, 300 and 420 mph were actually released simultaneously by Dodge, "on the same press page". The January 6, 2003, press release from Dodge announcing the Tomahawk and listing the specifications said it had "a potential top speed of nearly 400 miles per hour" and also said "Performance: 0–60 mph: 2.5 seconds (est.) Top Speed: 300+ mph (est.)". It also said, "It is both a sculpture that can be ridden, as well as a bold statement about the Chrysler Group's enthusiast culture and passion for design." Later press releases, in 2006 and in 2009, repeated the phrase "a potential top speed of nearly 400 miles per hour".

=== Aerodynamic considerations ===
Jeff Karr, in Motorcyclist magazine, agreed with chief designer Mark Walters's comments that perhaps 250 mph (400 km/h) was conceivable, according to rough calculations suggesting that motorcycles with far less drag, like the Suzuki Hayabusa and Kawasaki ZX-12R would need on the order of 460 hp (340 kW) to reach only 300 mph, and so the Tomahawk, with at least 50% more drag than those bikes, would have to have at least 700 hp (520 kW) to attain even 300 mph (480 km/h), given that drag increases as the square of speed. Without protection from wind blast and a secure riding position, however, approaching even 200 mph (320 km/h), let alone 250 mph (400 km/h), would be unsafe due to the instability of the design, and the lack of any provision to prevent aerodynamic lift from pulling the rider off the seat. Dave Campos, motorcycle land speed record rider, doubted the Tomahawk could reach 200 mph (320 km/h) because at high speeds, the rider would be "lifted right off the bike" without a fairing, and the four-wheel steering could also be a problem.

Joe Teresi of Easyriders magazine, owner of Campos' record-setting streamliner motorcycle, said the top speed estimate must have been based only on horsepower and final drive ratio, and ignored the "critical factors" of frontal area, drag coefficient, and rolling resistance.

=== Testing ===
Dodge spokesman David Elshoff said that Tomahawk would someday be taken for a run at the Bonneville Speedway, but no such attempt was ever made. Chrysler's chief operating officer Wolfgang Bernhard said in 2003 that no one had ridden the Tomahawk faster than 100 mph (160 km/h). Dodge declined offers to put the top speed claim to a test or to allow testing with a dynamometer that can simulate a top speed test, and no one is known to have attempted to ride the Tomahawk to its maximum speed. In 2003, a Tomahawk was ridden by Bud Bennett of RM Motorsports at the Goodwood Festival of Speed, but was able to complete only a single run, which he said "probably" reached 70 mph (110 km/h). Bennett said that up to then only four riders had ever ridden a Tomahawk.

== Critical reception ==
Most motorcycling, automotive, and science press greeted the Tomahawk with jokes and sarcasm roasting the Tomahawk, such as AutoWeek suggesting anyone riding the Tomahawk was a Darwin Award contender, and a 2015 book calling it "the strangest" of the 2003 Dodge vehicles and "one of Chrysler's nuttiest concepts". Freelance motorcycle designer and Motorcycle Consumer News columnist Glynn Kerr, however, wrote an analysis that took it seriously and critiqued it as he would a "real" motorcycle. Kerr described the top speed claims from Dodge as the work of "spin doctors", but said that the "less than convincing" "high-speed antics", combined with the failure to provide an obvious necessity of a fairing for a true high-speed motorcycle, or a fuel tank large enough to provide greater than 50 mi (80 km) range, were consistent with several indicators in the design of carelessness and laziness. Kerr called to task the car designers for a lack of curiosity about the basic tenets of motorcycle design, saying they were "underwhelmed" by the challenge. He said the Tomahawk "illustrates how the automotive industry considers motorcycles a lesser form of its own discipline" and so "feel entirely qualified to redesign one whenever they run out of ideas for sports cars."

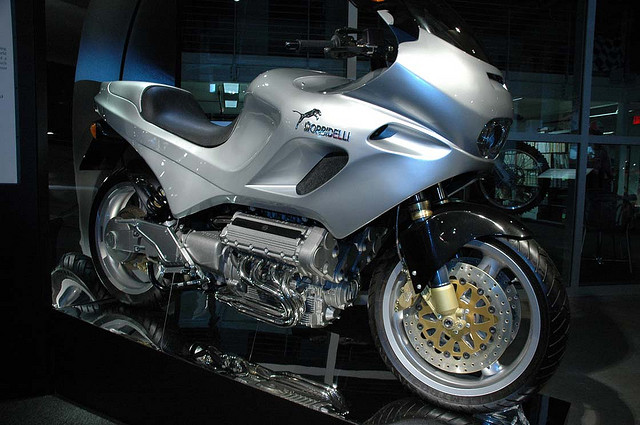
Morbidelli V8 design was criticized by Glynn Kerr, like the Tomahawk's, for ignoring motorcycle-specific design rules.

Kerr blamed this disregard of the rules of motorcycle design for the use of "too much over-simplified bodywork" on the Pininfarina Morbidelli V8, which the Tomahawk at least avoided, while still "missing the point about bikes." The indecision between making a sport bike or cruiser led to the uncomfortable ergonomics of a dragster motorcycle, but it did not matter because the Tomahawk was "not intended to be taken seriously", notwithstanding the intention to produce a limited production run. While he found the basic shape "not unpleasant", the unseriousness led to an unfinished result, pointing out the lack of harmonization in the twin ram-air intakes, and the "incongruous" use of a retro single vertical stalk planted in the fuel tank in an otherwise futuristic design. Kerr acknowledges that DaimlerChrysler does not "give a damn" about the motorcycle industry point of view, because the Tomahawk was successful in its real purpose, "creating an almighty furor within the automotive world."

Motorcyclist magazine's Jeff Karr speculated the boredom with having designed too many outlandish show cars, especially with DaimlerChrysler's history of doing the unexpected, made the designers want to do this for "the sheer outrage of the exercise", creating "a machine so resolutely evil, it has chunks of V-Max in its stool", "the ultimate bad-ass ride." Karr was positive about the "simultaneously futuristic and nostalgic" appearance where Glynn Kerr saw indecisiveness.

In response to automotive writer Stephan Wilkinson's suggestion that the Tomahawk was "essentially worthless" as a "usable vehicle", Design Continuum's Alan Mudd disagreed. Mudd said it "showed the public that Chrysler is made up of a bunch of passionate people. Even if it is a total adolescent wet dream, it has value because it tells the consumer that Chrysler is full of excited, creative people who just want to try some great new stuff." Lars Erik Lundin of Volvo's Concept Center in California said, "there's absolutely no risk that Volvo would ever do such craziness", adding that such flights of fancy "raise people's expectations", noting that Volvo showed a hybrid car in 1992 yet failed to deliver one even 12 years later. GM designer and automotive columnist Robert Cumberford agreed that leaving consumers disappointed is a risk, noting that the public loved the Range Stormer concept, creating a panic at Land Rover when they had nothing as "zoomy" to sell. Wilkinson said that concept cars serve less today as platforms to introduce new technology, such as power windows, LED lights, voice controls, or traffic display screens, and are instead more marketing tools and styling exercises.

The New York Times asked various auto industry luminaries to pick the standouts among their competitors at the 2003 Detroit Auto Show, including Jin Kim of Toyota's Calty Design Research, who picked the Cadillac Sixteen, the Dodge Kahuna, and the Tomahawk, saying, "Just the fact that they had the guts to put that thing on the turntable, you've got to give them credit. It's almost an icon of American automotive history, the raw power and sheer adrenaline. The whole thing looked like it was machined, milled out of a raw block of metal. It looked like something you would see in a futuristic movie." Ford's Camilo Pardo, Chief Designer of the Ford GT, also chose the Sixteen, and the Tomahawk, saying, "I'd like to give them a lot of credit for experimenting with a vehicle completely outside their categories. It was brave, and I thought the execution was really well done, very mature. It's a beautiful piece, and I'd love to have it sitting in a living room as a piece of art." Hyundai-Kia's Eric Stoddard agreed that "[t]hey are presenting the idea that they are not afraid to try anything, even a V-10 Viper-powered motorcycle."

== See also ==
- Gunbus 410
