= Auto Four =

Motorcycle designed and built by Wild Bill Gelbke

- Manufacturer: Wild Bill Gelbke
- Production: early 1970s
- Engine: 77.8 cu in (1,275 cc) British Leyland I-4
- Bore / stroke: 2.78 in (70.612 mm); 3.2 in (81.28 mm)
- Transmission: General Motors 4-speed automatic
- Weight: 1,300 pounds (590 kg) (dry)

The Auto Four is a motorcycle designed and built by engineer and motorcycle enthusiast Wild Bill Gelbke during the early 1970s. Approximately seven examples were built. Gelbke, who had attended engineering school in Wisconsin and at the University of Southern California, had worked for McDonnell Douglas and also owned two motorcycle shops in Chicago and Hammond, Indiana. After building his Roadog bike during the 1960s, he wanted to create a more practical large motorcycle for touring and police needs that could go into regular production. As with Roadog, Gelbke constructed and welded the frame himself using 4130 chrome-molybdenum tubing. The bikes were equipped with a BMC A-Series engine and General Motors 4-speed automatic transmission. While the frame and body were custom built by Gelbke, electrical parts, such as headlights and taillights, were sourced from General Motors vehicles, for example the taillights from a 1959 Cadillac. Suspension was sourced from Harley Davidson, particularly hydraglide front forks.

When the first prototype was completed in 1972, it was referred to as the "Gelbke Special", and reviewed in Cycle News East.They reported the bike to be comfortable, relatively easy to ride despite its size, and able to cruise easily and quietly at 100 miles per hour (160 km/h).

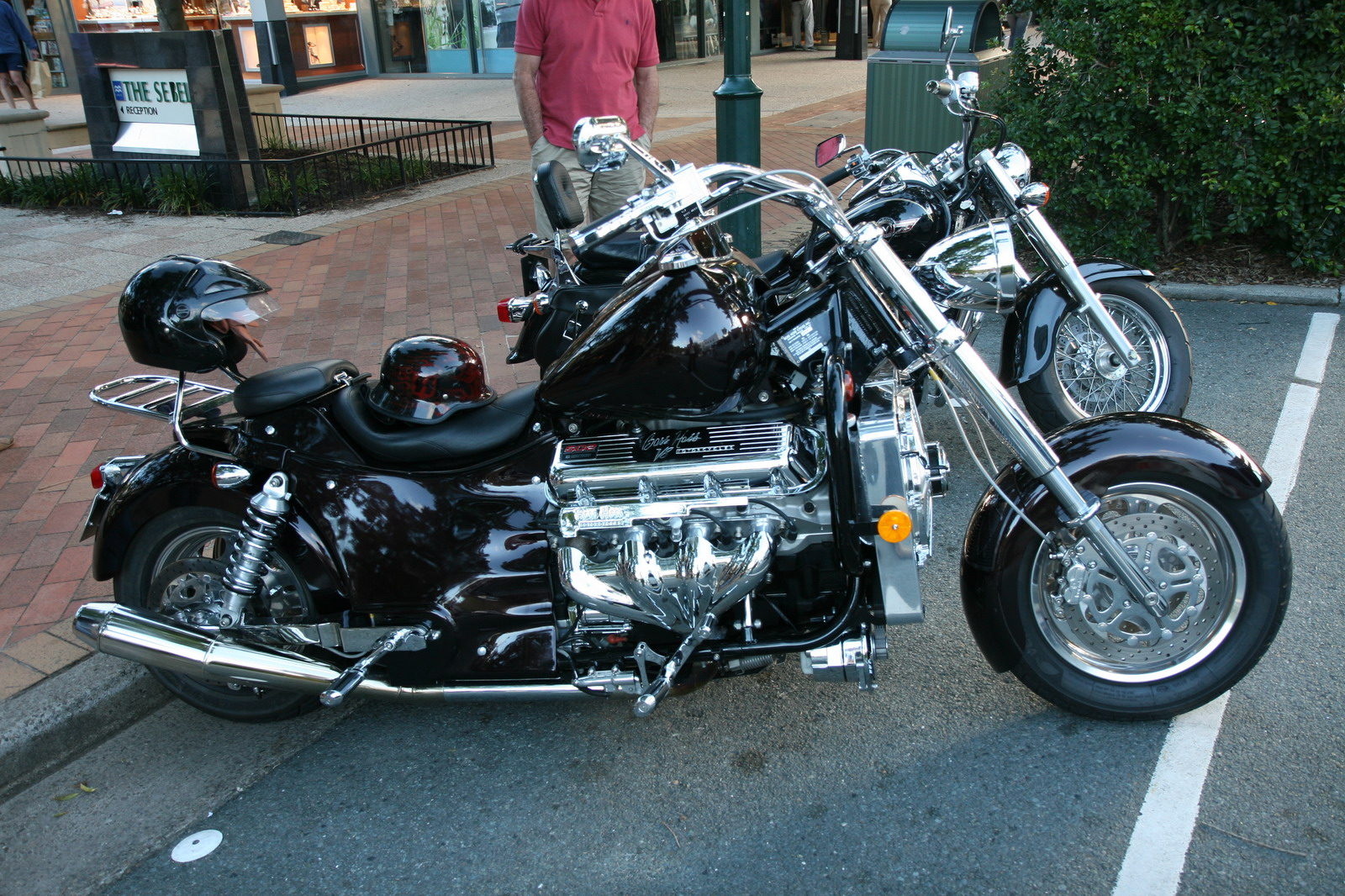
Similar V8-powered motorcycle from Boss Hoss Cycles

Since the 1990s, Boss Hoss Cycles sells similar V8-powered motorcycles.
