= Gunbus (disambiguation) =

Gunbus may refer to:

== Aircraft ==
- Burgess Gunbus, American biplane fighter
- Sopwith Gunbus, British WWI seaplane
- Vickers F.B.5 Gunbus, British WWI fighter

== Other ==
- Gunbus 410, German motorcycle
- Gunbus (film), 1986 British film, also known as Sky Bandits
