= Boss Hoss =

Boss Hoss may refer to:

- Boss Hoss Cycles, a motorcycle company
- Hot Wheels "Boss Hoss", a 1969 Ford Mustang Boss 302 miniature
- The BossHoss, a German band

== See also ==
- Horse
- Free and Open Source Software (FOSS)
