= Dodge SRT-10 =

The designation Dodge SRT-10 can refer to three vehicles, all of them powered by Dodge's V10 engine:

- Dodge Viper SRT-10
- Dodge Ram SRT-10
- Dodge Tomahawk SRT-10
