= Paramount Network =

American television channel

- Logo used since February 25, 2024
- Type: General entertainment cable network
- Country: United States
- Broadcast area: Nationwide
- Headquarters: 5555 Melrose Avenue, Los Angeles, California, United States

Programming
- Language: English
- Picture format: 1080i HDTV

Ownership
- Owner: Skydance Global Cable Media (MTV Entertainment Group)
- Parent: Skydance
- Key people: Chris McCarthy (President, Entertainment & Youth Brands, Paramount Media Networks); Tanya Giles (GM) (Note: In addition to oversight for Paramount Network, duties of the noted executives also include oversight of sister networks Comedy Central and TV Land.); Rob O’Neill (SVP, Programming & Promotion Strategy); Debbie Beiter (Senior Vice President, Operations and Production)
- Sister channels: list of assets owned by Skydance

History
- Launched: March 7, 1983; 43 years ago
- Former names: The Nashville Network (1983–2000); The National Network (2000–2001); The New TNN (2001–2003); Spike TV (2003–2006); Spike (2006–2018)

Links
- Website: paramountnetwork.com

Availability

Streaming media
- Associated Streaming Service: Paramount+
- Service(s): YouTube TV, Hulu + Live TV, Philo, FuboTV

Paramount Network (formerly known The Nashville Network, The National Network, The New TNN and Spike TV (or simply Spike) is an American basic cable television channel owned and operated by the MTV Entertainment Group unit of the Skydance Global Cable Media subsidiary of Skydance Corporation, serving as its flagship property. Headquartered at the Paramount Pictures studio lot in Los Angeles, it was originally founded by a partnership between radio station WSM and Westinghouse Broadcasting as The Nashville Network (TNN) and began broadcasting on March 7, 1983.

It initially featured programming catering towards the culture of the Southern United States, including country music, variety shows, outdoors programming, and motor racing coverage (such as NASCAR). TNN was purchased by the Gaylord Entertainment Company in 1983. After Gaylord bought CMT in 1991, TNN's music programming was shifted to CMT, leaving TNN to focus on entertainment and lifestyle programming.

In 1995, TNN and CMT were acquired by Westinghouse (owner of CBS), which was in turn acquired by Viacom in 1999. Under Viacom ownership, TNN would phase out country-influenced programming in favor of a general entertainment format appealing to Middle America. It was renamed "The National Network" in September 2000, coinciding with the network premiere of WWF Raw. In August 2003, TNN relaunched as Spike TV, which targeted a young adult male audience. From June 2006, the network's programming had a more explicit focus on the action genre, while in 2010, the network had an increased focus on original reality series. This culminated with a final rebrand in 2015 to emphasize gender-balanced series (such as Lip Sync Battle) and a return to original scripted programming.

On January 18, 2018, the channel took its current name, aiming to align the channel with the Paramount Pictures film studio, and reposition it as a "premium" alignment cable network similar to competitors such as AMC and FX. Paramount Network's most successful original program was Yellowstone—which quickly became its flagship series, and has spawned multiple spin-offs on Paramount+, the streaming service owned by its parent company Skydance. The network has also featured limited engagements of new Paramount+ original series by Yellowstone co-creator Taylor Sheridan, using Yellowstone as a lead-in.

Between 2020 and 2021, most of Paramount Network's original programming would either be cancelled, or moved to other Paramount Global outlets, as part of a proposed plan to relaunch the network with a focus on made-for-TV films. By January 2022, these plans had been scrapped due to the impact of COVID-19, and the success of the Yellowstone franchise; leaving it, and Spike holdover Bar Rescue, as the channel's only original, first-run programs. As of December 2023, approximately 61.33 million pay television households in the United States received Paramount Network; down from 80.24 million in September 2018.

== History ==
=== The Nashville Network (1983–2000) ===
The Nashville Network first launched on March 7, 1983; it was dedicated to the culture and lifestyle of country music and the Southern United States. It originally operated as a joint venture of WSM, Inc., at the time owned by National Life and Accident Insurance Company and Westinghouse Broadcasting.

After Westinghouse successor CBS Corporation bought TNN outright, the channel began to phase out its previous country lifestyle format, and drifted to focus more on acquired films and television series to attract wider demographics. Its largest successes came with a "Friday Night Thrill Zone" block targeting young adult male viewers, featuring the roller derby series RollerJam, motorsports and bull riding shows, and a weekly television series from Extreme Championship Wrestling (ECW); despite the program's success, ECW's management would have a strained relationship with TNN executives.

In September 2000, new owner Viacom brought TNN under its New York-based MTV Networks division and relaunched it as "The National Network" (later promoted as "The New TNN"—an inadvertent pleonasm in its full context), signifying a transition to a general entertainment format targeting Middle America. The relaunch coincided with the move of Monday Night Raw—the flagship weekly program of the World Wrestling Federation (WWF, now WWE)—to TNN from the rival USA Network.

In 2001, TNN began to add more off-network dramas and sitcoms such as Baywatch, CSI, and the Star Trek franchise among others. It also began to add new original series such as Small Shots and the hidden camera quiz show Oblivious, with a goal for at least 50% of TNN's output to be original programming by 2005. Some of The Nashville Network's former programming was picked up by sister channel CMT, while other classic TNN shows were picked up by Great American Country, including eventually the Grand Ole Opry, which was moved to CMT and eventually removed by Viacom after they did not renew their agreement to carry the series.

=== Spike (2003–2018) ===
Spike's logo, used from August 11, 2003 to May 9, 2006

In April 2003, MTV Networks announced that TNN would be relaunched as Spike TV on June 16. Promoted with the slogan "The First Network for Men", the relaunch would target young adult males aged 18–34—a demographic MTV Networks believed was being underserved by other cable networks. New original programming announced for the channel included the miniseries 10 Things Every Guy Should Experience, Ride with Funkmaster Flex, and a slate of adult animation series such as Gary the Rat, Ren & Stimpy "Adult Party Cartoon" (an adult-oriented spin-off of The Ren & Stimpy Show), and Stripperella. Other planned programming included interstitial segments on health, technology, finance, and automotive news in collaboration with Men's Health, CBS MarketWatch, and Stuff.

Three days before the planned launch date, film director and actor Spike Lee won a New York Supreme Court injunction preventing Viacom from using the "Spike TV” name. Lee claimed that due to his well-known popularity in Hollywood, viewers would therefore assume that he was associated with the new channel. Lee stated in court papers that: "The media description of this change of name, as well as comments made to me and my wife, confirmed what was obvious—that Spike TV referred to Spike Lee." Spike Jones Jr., son of comic musician Spike Jones, became a party to the lawsuit as part of Viacom's defense to protect the rights to his father's name. Most of the new programming would premiere on the originally-planned date as a soft launch; at this time, the TNN name and logo were downplayed in favor of the "First Network for Men" tagline. The suit was settled on July 8, 2003, with Lee admitting that he did not believe that Spike TV was intentionally trying to trade upon his name.

On July 28, 2003, it was announced that Spike TV would officially launch on August 11—eight weeks later than initially scheduled. Its launch night programming featured two programs originally intended to air on June 16, including Party with Spike—a launch special filmed at the Playboy Mansion, and the series premiere of Most Extreme Elimination Challenge (MXC)—a comedic dub of the Japanese game show Takeshi's Castle. Klasky Csupo's Immigrants and the John Leguizamo-produced Zilch & Zero were originally slated to run on Spike TV's animation block, but these plans never materialized and the former was released as a film instead. Later that year, Spike premiered the reality television parody The Joe Schmo Show, and held the inaugural Spike Video Game Awards.

On January 17, 2005, Spike TV premiered The Ultimate Fighter, a reality competition series following mixed martial arts (MMA) fighters training and competing to earn a contract with the Ultimate Fighting Championship (UFC). The series helped to raise the profile of the promotion, and would run on Spike for 14 seasons; in 2011, the series moved to Fox Sports after it acquired the U.S. television rights to UFC programming and events under a new, seven-year deal. That month, Spike also premiered the new video game news show Game Head, hosted by Geoff Keighley.

In March 2005, Viacom announced that it would not renew its contract with WWE when it expired in September 2005. Spike TV's new president Doug Herzog stated that the network was planning to invest more heavily in original programming (including scripted programming) and acquisitions to appeal to its target audience. The following month, it was announced that WWE Raw would return to USA Network. Spike TV subsequently reached an agreement with another wrestling promotion, Total Nonstop Action Wrestling (TNA), which saw its flagship weekly program TNA Impact! move to the channel beginning on October 1, 2005.

==== "Get More Action" ====
Spike's logo, used from May 9, 2006 to March 3, 2015

In 2005, Viacom conducted research which found that word-of-mouth knowledge narrowly perceived Spike TV's programming as being predominantly "low-brow,” violent, and reliant on sex appeal. These findings led Viacom to pursue a rebrand in an effort to clarify the network's focus. At its upfront presentations in 2006, Viacom unveiled a new logo for the channel (officially shortening its name to "Spike"), with the new slogan "Get More Action.” The new brand was described as being "authentic" and "unapologetically" masculine, and emphasizing action as a core genre of programming for the network. The new branding would launch alongside the premiere of Blade: The Series in June 2006. An aspect of the rebranding were themed promos with integrated product placement, such as "Men of Action" (which featured homages and parodies of "classic action moments").

On September 5, 2006, Spike premiered the documentary film Metal of Honor: The Ironworkers of 9/11 by filmmaker Rachel Maguire, which profiled the ironworkers' efforts in the attempts for rescue and recovery of the September 11 attacks at the World Trade Center site. The film proceeds through the ironworkers' dismantling of the fallen towers. On October 10, 2006, Spike aired the inaugural Scream Awards, an awards show honoring horror, science fiction, fantasy and comic book-based entertainment. In January 2007, Spike premiered their first and only anime series, Afro Samurai, starring Samuel L. Jackson.

In October 2007, Kevin Kay was appointed president of Spike after serving as executive vice president and general manager of the channel for the previous two years. The post had been vacant since December 2006. In January 2008, Spike ordered DEA, a reality series from Al Roker Productions following agents of the Drug Enforcement Administration in Detroit. Viacom also signed Geoff Keighley to an expanded development deal for video game-related programming on Spike and its platforms, including the rebranding of Game Head as GameTrailers TV with Geoff Keighley, and Keighley taking on a consulting role for the Spike Video Game Awards and other gaming-related specials.

In 2009, Spike broadcast live Australian rugby league semifinal games from the National Rugby League and also showed the grand final, as part of efforts by David Niu to bring the National Rugby League USA to the United States. On June 1, 2010, Spike launched into the first crowd-sourced pilot episode contest with Scripped, a web-based screenwriting community.

==== "Get Real" ====
In January 2011, Spike ordered two new reality television shows, Bar Rescue and Repo Games. During Viacom's upfronts presentation that May, it was announced that Spike would undergo a brand repositioning, with a larger focus on reality programming and a broader audience of males in the key demographic. The changes were intended to pivot Spike's brand in a more mature direction, which were described as an aim to be less like Maxim magazine and more like Esquire. A promotional campaign emphasized adversity as a common theme in Spike's programming.

The following year, Spike ordered the new series Rat Bastards (a series following a pest control business in Mississippi), Tattoo Nightmares, along with a revival of World's Wildest Police Videos, and Full Bounty—a bounty hunting reality series later revealed be a third season of The Joe Schmo Show. In 2013, Bellator MMA made its network debut with the premiere of its eighth season; the now Viacom-owned mixed martial arts promotion previously aired on sibling channel MTV2. Later that year, Fox reality series Cops moved to Spike beginning September 14. In the fall, kickboxing promotion Glory made its network debut with Glory 11: Chicago. This was not Spike's first time broadcasting a kickboxing event as, in 2012, they partnered with K-1 to broadcast several events on their website. The end of the year saw the Spike Video Game Awards revamped and become known as VGX.

At the end of the year, Impact Wrestling would air its last episode on Spike on December 24, 2014, before moving to Destination America in 2015. Spike also announced that they would drop VGX; Keighley would go on to form The Game Awards as a spiritual successor to the telecast. In January 2015, Spike reached an agreement with Al Haymon's Premier Boxing Champions to air monthly cards on the channel. Alongside its first PBC card in March 2015, Spike would introduce a new combat sports anthology known as Friday Night Lights Out, featuring Bellator, Glory, and PBC events. During weeks where there was not a live event, Spike planned to air ancillary programming highlighting fighters and upcoming events. Spike president Kevin Kay explained that the PBC deal was part of an effort to expand the audience of boxing among young adult viewers in the same way it had done with kickboxing and MMA, and that Friday nights were a time slot with "very little sports competition".

==== "The Ones to Watch" ====
The final Spike logo used from March 3, 2015 to January 18, 2018. Currently used by the collection of Pluto TV channels of the same name.

During its upfronts on March 3, 2015, Spike unveiled a new logo and accompanying promotional campaign, "The Ones to Watch". The re-branding aimed to attact female audiences, emphasizing a focus on "big talent, engaging shows and hits that get people talking" and further expansions into scripted series. Alongside the miniseries Tut and the announcement of an expanded episode order for the series Lip Sync Battle (a spin-off of a segment from Late Night with Jimmy Fallon), Spike announced an output deal with Dwayne Johnson's Seven Bucks Productions for a series of specials, Emergency Broadcast, an original drama co-created by Max Brooks, and Sweat Inc., a fitness-oriented reality series hosted by Jillian Michaels.

=== Paramount Network (2018–present) ===
Paramount Network logo used from January 18, 2018 to February 24, 2024

Paramount Network logo without the mountain, used since January 18, 2018

On February 9, 2017, Viacom announced that Spike would relaunch as Paramount Network in 2018 and move its headquarters from the One Astor Plaza in New York City to Paramount Pictures in Los Angeles to give the network a closer association with the film studio. This was part of a restructuring plan by new Viacom CEO Bob Bakish to refocus the majority of its media business around six flagship brands, which included Paramount Pictures, BET, Comedy Central, Nickelodeon, Nick Jr., and MTV. New original series announced in the first half of 2018 included the miniseries Waco and Yellowstone, along with American Woman and Heathers—two comedies originally slated for TV Land. The Shannara Chronicles, which moved to Spike for season 2 from MTV, was not renewed by Paramount Network.

Paramount Network is being positioned as a "premium" basic cable network, similar to AMC and FX. Network president Kevin Kay explained that Bakish wanted Viacom to have a "flagship" outlet for scripted programming, as opposed to making inefficient investments into them across individual channels. He added that Paramount Network's offerings would be distinguished from its competitors by continuing to emphasize Middle America as a key viewer base. Even with its subsequent rebrandings, Paramount Network still had significant carriage strength and viewership in the Midwest and South due to its heritage as TNN. Kay argued that its initial slate of original dramas were not as "dark,” citing the setting of Yellowstone as making it "brighter and a bit more blue sky than some of the things that are on premium cable TV now.”

In regards to the programs moved to Paramount Network from TV Land, American Woman was moved to take advantage of its prominent leads Alicia Silverstone and Mena Suvari, while Heathers was moved because, in Kay's opinion, the show was not appropriate for TV Land's target audience. In June 2018, Heathers was dropped by Paramount Network and Viacom, citing network concerns over the content of the series in the wake of recent shootings in the United States, such as the Stoneman Douglas High School shooting. The series would eventually air on Paramount Network in October 2018 in an edited form, with two episodes dropped due to the Pittsburgh synagogue shooting.

Paramount Network began a viral marketing campaign to promote its launch in December 2017. The campaign included a Times Square advertisement asking viewers to phone and email Paramount Network's chief marketing officer Niels Schuurmans to protest Spike's "firing,” as well as a string of self-deprecating posts by the network's Twitter account about its history and programming (including that "My favorite number is 329 because it's the number of times Cops is on every night,” "We had a show called The Joe Schmo Show. Apparently every decent show name was taken", and that "There's a reason all our early shows were CSI, UFC, TNA, MXC, UTI. No one around here knew how to read"). A network executive stated that the campaign was meant to represent a "public meltdown" by a fired employee.

The campaign concluded with a live streaming event on January 17, 2018, where users could vote on various ways a crew would deface a large model of the former Spike logo, culminating in its demolition. Paramount Network officially launched the following night at 9:00 p.m. ET, marked by a live, Michael Jackson-themed Lip Sync Battle special from the Dolby Theatre.

In April 2019, Viacom would revive the Spike branding as channels for its free ad-supported streaming television (FAST) platform Pluto TV, including a Spike channel mainly carrying action and reality programming from its library, and Spike Outdoors.

==== Aborted rebrand as a movie network ====
In early 2020, Paramount Network began to cut back on scripted series development, having dropped upcoming projects such as Emily in Paris (which was subsequently picked up by Netflix), and cancelling 68 Whiskey after a single season. On September 11, 2020, it was announced that Bellator would move to CBS Sports Network in October 2020. It would later move to Showtime in April 2021.

On September 22, 2020, ViacomCBS president of Entertainment and Youth Brands Chris McCarthy told Variety in an exclusive that Paramount Network would relaunch as the Paramount Movie Network "within the next year". The relaunched network was to focus primarily on original made-for-TV films featuring major talent, with a plan to premiere 52 films per-year. The films would have been largely produced by Paramount Pictures and MTV Studios, with plans for co-productions with ViacomCBS International networks such as Argentina's Telefe, Australia's Network 10, and the United Kingdom's Channel 5. These changes would have mirrored a similar shift in programming that McCarthy undertook at sister channel Comedy Central, which also dropped live-action series development in favor of original specials, films, and adult animation.

At least one scripted series or miniseries was to be carried per-quarter, such as Yellowstone (albeit with episodes premiering in a different format to suit a cinematic presentation), but the channel was to abandon non-scripted programming. In preparation for the relaunch, it was stated that Bar Rescue and Lip Sync Battle would move to another ViacomCBS channel to be determined, while Ink Master and Wife Swap were both cancelled.

Former Lifetime SVP of original movies Meghan Hooper White had been brought on as ViacomCBS's head of original movies and specials in May 2020, and was to oversee the Paramount Movie Network slate, as well as television films and specials across all other ViacomCBS networks. However, she was released from the company in August 2021 as part of a reorganization of Paramount+ and MTV Entertainment Group's executive structure. In the interim, new seasons of Bar Rescue and Yellowstone would premiere on the network in 2021, and in October 2021, the second season of The Last Cowboy (a reality competition series by Yellowstone co-creator Taylor Sheridan) moved to CMT. Ink Master was also picked up for a new season by Paramount+.

The channel also began a strategy of promoting new Paramount+ original series involving Sheridan, such as Mayor of Kingstown and Yellowstone prequel 1883, under which their initial episodes were given special television airings on Paramount Network as lead-outs for Yellowstone. 1883 would set a record for the highest-rated premiere in Paramount Network history, and on cable overall since 2015, with 4.9 million viewers. McCarthy described this practice as a method of using its linear platforms as a "launch pad" for streaming content.

In January 2022, Deadline reported that the network relaunch had been shelved, partly due to the impact of the COVID-19 pandemic on television and film production, in addition to Yellowstone's ratings success—which had been influenced by the acquisition of streaming rights to the series by NBCUniversal's Peacock. The network also acquired linear rights to the Spectrum Originals series George & Tammy. During the Paramount Global upfronts in May 2022, it was announced that Yellowstone spin-off 6666 had been shifted from Paramount+ to Paramount Network, the fifth season of Yellowstone would premiere in November 2022, and that the first two episodes of Sheridan and Sylvester Stallone's Paramount+ series Tulsa King would receive special airings as lead-outs for Yellowstone.

== Programming ==
Paramount Network's current programming consists primarily of reruns of sitcoms and drama series, as well as airings of feature films. As of 2022, the network's lone original drama is Yellowstone, which launched alongside the rebranding of Spike as Paramount Network, and grew in viewership throughout its first four seasons. Bar Rescue, a reality series carried over from Spike, has also continued to air new episodes on Paramount Network.

As Spike, male-oriented programs constituted the majority of the network's schedule upon its original relaunch in 2003. By 2011, Spike had shifted its programming towards shows aimed at a broader audience, such as Bar Rescue. Finally, with its 2015 rebrand, Spike attempted to add more "gender-balanced" programming.

The network had formerly carried combat sports programming throughout its various incarnations; being the first basic cable home of mixed martial arts promotion UFC, and including early seasons of the promotion's reality series The Ultimate Fighter. Other promotions and sports-related programming have included kickboxing events from Glory and K-1; professional wrestling from TNA Wrestling, WWE, and Extreme Championship Wrestling; boxing cards from Premier Boxing Champions; and the Paramount-owned Bellator MMA and Bellator Kickboxing.

== Website ==
On October 15, 2005, Viacom acquired iFilm, which was initially launched in 1997. After acquiring the website for $49 million, it was eventually rebranded to Spike.com and provided hosting of user-uploaded videos in a short-lived attempt to compete with YouTube (which Viacom had sued to remove user-generated uploads of its programming from), a strategy eventually abandoned to refocus Spike.com as a general network site. The iFilm.com domain redirected to the Screen Junkies website for a period of time.

During the era where they hosted user generated content, Spike.com's managers only approved videos pre-screened to meet their standards. On January 18, 2018, Spike.com was sunsetted, and viewers were redirected to the new Paramount Network site and domain.

== International availability ==
=== Canada ===
In April 1984, while as TNN, the Canadian Radio-television and Telecommunications Commission (CRTC) approved the channel for carriage by Canadian cable and satellite television providers. Following its re-branding as Spike TV, the Canadian Association of Broadcasters filed a complaint with the CRTC on behalf of Canwest Global, demanding the channel be removed from Canadian television providers. The CAB felt that its new general entertainment format would unduly compete with various Canadian-run specialty channels, arguing that there was overlap in its niche and its then-current schedule with Men TV (men's lifestyle), Space (Star Trek), sports channels such as TheScore (WWE), Discovery Health (interstitial segments focusing on men's health, although the network did not air any full-length programs on the topic and mainly focused on generic women's and children's health and pregnancy-related programming at the time), along with the inexplicable naming of Report on Business Television and CTV Travel for reasons unknown.

In January 2005, the CRTC dismissed the CAB's complaint, ruling that it provided insufficient evidence that Spike was directly competing with Canadian specialty channels. The CRTC ruled that Spike did not unduly compete with Men TV, since it was licensed as a service that would carry men's lifestyle programming (in contrast to Spike, which the CRTC classified as a general entertainment channel targeting males), and that the remaining allegations of overlap with domestic Canadian specialty channels represented only a minority of Spike's overall programming.

Due to programming rights issues, programs which the channel does not hold rights to air outside of the U.S. are replaced with alternate programs, consisting mainly of reruns of Spike's previous reality programs.

In 2022, with Paramount Global prioritizing promotion of the Paramount+ streaming service in the market instead, a number of major providers began dropping the channel, beginning with Rogers Communications on April 1, 2022, followed by Shaw Cable and Shaw Direct on August 31, 2023, and Eastlink on September 15, 2023. The Canadian feed was discontinued on all other providers on January 1, 2024.

=== Czech Republic ===
Prima Comedy Central was rebranded as Paramount Network on January 12, 2021.

=== Hungary ===
On December 17, 2020, Paramount Channel in Hungary rebranded as the Paramount Network.

=== Latin America ===
On April 14, 2020, ViacomCBS rebranded the Latin American version of Paramount Channel into Paramount Network.

=== Netherlands ===
Spike rebranded as the Paramount Network in the Netherlands on May 24, 2022.

=== Spain ===
In May 2018, Viacom announced that it would rebrand Paramount Channel in Spain under the Paramount Network name on June 10, 2018, marking Viacom's first property outside of the U.S. to adopt the brand. Paramount Channel in Spain had been among Viacom's most successful international properties. The channel adopted a similar general entertainment format to the U.S. version, with its launch lineup featuring the fifth season of Alaska y Mario (moving from MTV Spain), and a lineup of imported dramas and films.

=== United Kingdom ===
Paramount Network launched in the United Kingdom on July 4, 2018, it is operated by the Viacom-owned network Channel 5. It is the second Paramount-branded property in that market; its domestic version of Comedy Central launched as the Paramount Channel in 1995, then was Paramount Comedy from 1997 until 2009, when it took the Comedy Central name. On January 7, 2020, it replaced the British version of Spike in its channel allotments on Freeview, cable, and satellite. The British version of Paramount Network was closed the day prior, and rebranded as 5Action on January 19, 2022.

=== Spike ===
Viacom began to launch localized versions of Spike in 2015.

- On April 15, 2015, a British version of Spike was launched; owned by Viacom International Media Networks Europe, it is operated as a sister digital terrestrial television channel to Channel 5, which Viacom had acquired the previous year. Its launch lineup primarily featured Spike's original programs and reruns from its parent network, acquired U.S. drama imports (such as Breaking Bad, Justified and The Walking Dead), along with Bellator MMA and the domestic MMA promotion BAMMA. On 31 October 2017, the channel changed its name to 5Spike to better-signify its connection to Channel 5's other digital networks. On 7 January 2020, 5Spike was shut down, with its channel allotments and selected programs being assumed by the British version of Paramount Network.
- On August 18, 2015, Viacom announced that a Dutch version of Spike would launch in the Netherlands and Flanders. The channel began as a timeshare on the Dutch Nickelodeon channel, airing from 21:00 to 02:30 CET daily. On December 12, 2016, Spike launched in the Netherlands as a 24-hour channel on Ziggo. Spike and Nickelodeon continued time-sharing in Flanders until January 6, 2021, when Nickelodeon became a 24-hour channel again. on May 24, 2022, Spike was replaced by Paramount Network.
- In July 2016, an Australian version of Spike was launched on Fetch TV. This channel was closed on 27 February 2022 with no replacement.
- On December 1, 2016, a Hungarian version of the channel named RTL Spike was launched, via brand licensing and advertising sales agreements with the RTL Group. On October 20, 2020, ViacomCBS announced the channel's closure, and the closure date was confirmed on November 23 that year. RTL Spike was shut down on January 12, 2021, and was replaced by TeenNick.
- On March 15, 2017, a Russian version of Spike was launched as a separate channel, airing alongside the local version of Paramount Channel. This channel was shut down on June 1, 2021.
- On October 22, 2017, an Italian version of Spike was launched in the country as a free-to-air channel, replacing Fine Living on Digital TV channel 49. The channel, however, ceased broadcasting on January 16, 2022.
