= Mad Dogs and Englishmen (film) =

- Directed by: Henry Cole
- Starring: Elizabeth Hurley; C. Thomas Howell; Joss Ackland
- Music by: Barrie Guard
- Distributed by: Entertainment
- Release date: 2 June 1995
- Country: United Kingdom

Mad Dogs and Englishmen is a 1995 British thriller film directed by Henry Cole and starring Elizabeth Hurley, C. Thomas Howell and Joss Ackland. The screenplay concerns an upper-class drug addict pursued by the criminal underworld.

The screenplay was written by Henry Cole and Tim Sewell. The film's title is derived from the Noël Coward patter song, "Mad Dogs and Englishmen", which has the refrain: "Mad dogs and Englishmen go out in the midday sun."

== Plot ==
Antonia Dyer is a well-to-do Englishwoman with a serious drug habit. Her heroin supply is delivered by an American motorcycle courier named Mike Stone, and before long the two of them also develop a romantic attachment.

Not only does Antonia risk her life with drug use, but she is physically assaulted by a deranged police inspector named Stringer who has a particular distaste for high-society addicts. Stringer also has two dangerous thugs who work on the side for Tony Vernon-Smith, a drug lord, further putting Antonia's life in jeopardy.

== Cast ==
- Elizabeth Hurley as Antonia Dyer
- C. Thomas Howell as Mike
- Joss Ackland as Inspector Sam Stringer
- Christopher Adamson as Max Quinlan
- Marcus Bentley as Photographer's Assistant
- Claire Bloom as Liz Stringer
- Jeremy Brett as Tony Vernon-Smith
- Russ Kane as Flying Eye Reporter
- Andrew Connolly as Clive Nathan
- Louise Delamere as Sandy
- Cheryl Doll as Young Antonia
- Nicola Duffett as Diane
- Alan Freeman as Disc Jockey
- Paula Hamilton as Charlie
- David Harewood as Jessop
- Ian Henderson as Surveillance Detective
- Daniel Jenkins as Junkie
- Patrick Lichfield as Himself
- Frederick Treves as Sir Harry Dyer

== Reception ==
Time Out gave Mad Dogs and Englishmen a negative review, writing that "The handling is clumsy, the moralising dire, and gestures towards genre movie-making are laughable".

The film opened 2 June 1995 in the United Kingdom on 33 screens and grossed £38,077 in its opening weekend.
