= Allen Millyard =

Specialist motorcycle builder

Allen Millyard from Thatcham, Berkshire, England, is a mechanical engineer and a custom bike builder.

For over 25 years, he has designed and created numerous ingenious motorcycle specials. Most of these are derived from factory-built machines, and include a Honda SS50-based V-twin, (and thereby winning best in show for "the world's smallest V-twin at Salon Privée), a 700cc V-twin Velocette and the "Flying Millyard", which uses an engine derived from an air-cooled radial aviation motor. Another large capacity bike he hand-made is the Millyard Viper, built around an eight-litre V10 engine from a Dodge Viper. He has built several Kawasaki specials (both two and four strokes) including a 2,400cc V12. Some of these bikes are on display at the Barber Museum, in Birmingham, Alabama, US.

Millyard has made numerous videos about his motorcycle specials, and has posted them on YouTube. A 2024 project involves the dismantling, cleaning, refining, and rebuilding the ill-fated Norton Nemesis, a concept motorcycle fitted with a V8 engine. As yet incomplete, as of March 2025, the series runs to 17 episodes.

In recent years Millyard has become more widely known via his TV appearances with Henry Cole. Together they claimed a world speed-record, ratified by Guinness World Records at 183.50 mph (295.31 km/h), achieved with the pair riding "tandem" on the road-legal Viper, beating by two mph the previous record held by an American couple for over 10 years. The record was set using the 9,800 ft (3,000 m) long runway at Elvington Airfield, North Yorkshire, England, on 25 May 2023.
