= Walneck's Classic Cycle Trader =

American motorcycle magazine published from 1978 to 2014

- Categories: Motorcycles
- Frequency: Monthly
- Total circulation: 48,081 (2014)
- Founded: 1978
- Final issue: 2014
- Company: Walneck's, Inc. (1978–1997); Trader Publishing (1997–2012); Causey Enterprises LLC (2012–2014)
- Country: United States
- Based in: Woodridge, Illinois
- Language: English
- Website: walnecks.com
- ISSN: 1051-8088
- OCLC: 22125719

Walneck's Classic Cycle Trader was a motorcycle magazine begun in 1978 by motorcycle enthusiasts and swap meet organizers Buzz and Pixie Walneck. The first issues were flyers that listed motorcycle parts for sale; demand for parts and complete motorcycles subsequently resulted in the publication growing into a large, full color magazine that contained over 120 pages during its peak. In 1997 the Walnecks sold the magazine to Trader Publishing, which enabled international distribution. In 2012, it was sold again to Causey Enterprises LLC, who redesigned the magazine extensively, however ceased publishing in 2014. The magazine was established and originally headquartered in Woodridge, Illinois before it was sold to Norfolk, Virginia-based Trader Publishing.

== Format ==
In addition to classified ads for motorcycles, parts, accessories and related services, the magazine also featured columns written by Buzz Walneck (who remained as the magazine's editor until 2012), as well as a number of other writers. It also included reprints of classic motorcycle tests and reviews, typically from Cycle World, as well as listings for large national motorcycle auctions and Buzz Walneck's swap meets. In the early 1990s, Walneck was responsible for tracking down Roadog, a large, custom-built motorcycle that was the subject of popular posters, and purchasing one of two existing examples; the magazine subsequently contained many articles about his search for the bike. Buzz Walneck frequently appears at motorcycle events and auctions, and is an adviser to Sotheby's regarding vintage motorcycles. Walneck's ceased publishing in 2014, however other magazines have followed a similar format, including Moto Retro Illustrated. In 2014, Walneck resumed publishing his own magazine called The Buzzzzz Rag using the original Walneck's format.
