= Millyard Viper V10 =

Custom motorcycle

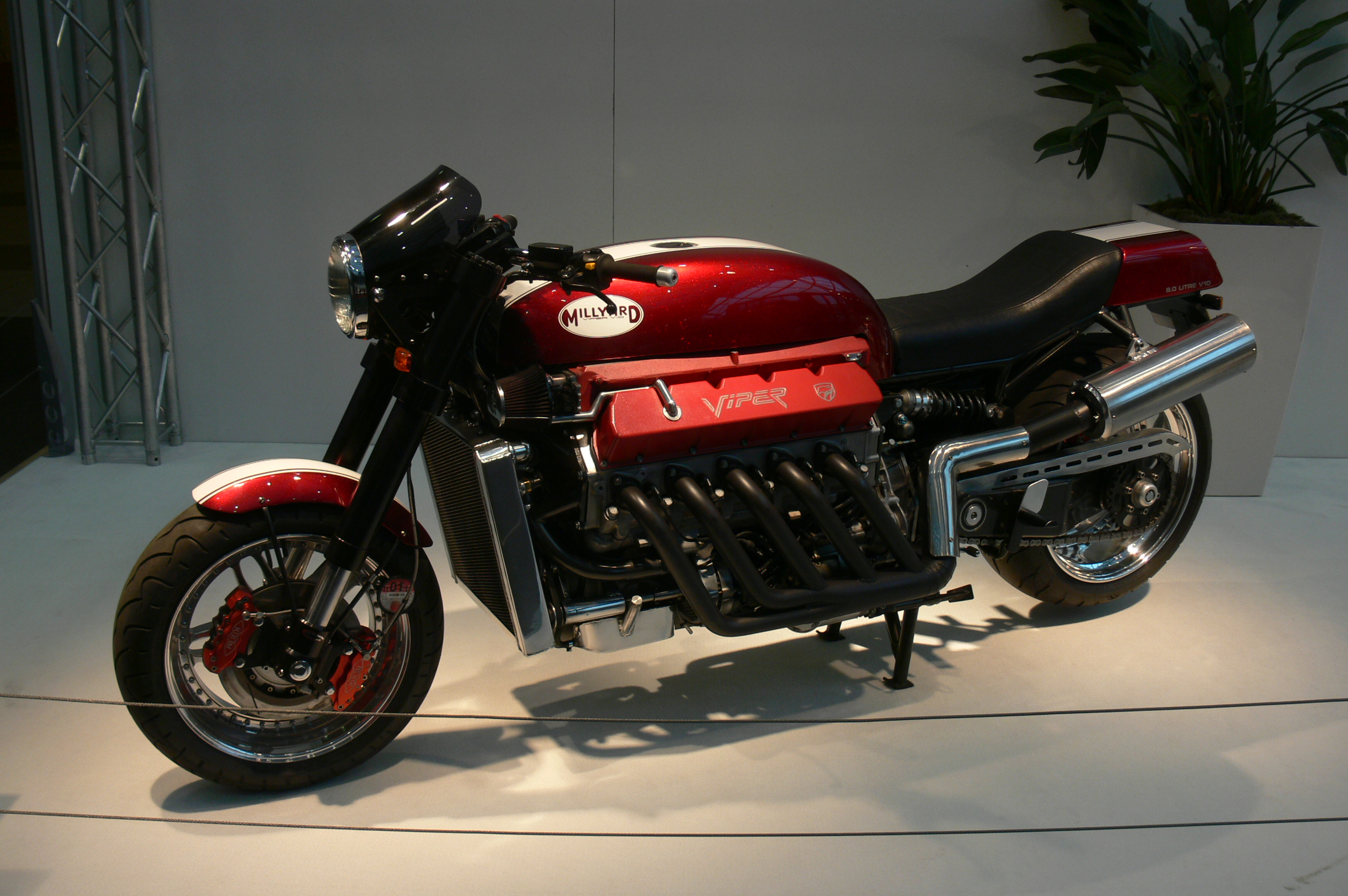
Millyard Viper V10 at the Essen Motor Show

The Millyard Viper V10 is a one-off hand-made, road-legal motorcycle capable of over 200 mph (320 km/h) built by British engineer Allen Millyard. The motorcycle weighs 1,200 lb (540 kg), of which 700 lb (320 kg) is the engine. Sourced from eBay and originally intended for a Dodge Viper, the 8-litre V10 engine produces 500 bhp (370 kW) at 4,800rpm.

A front subframe mounted to the engine carries the steering and suspension, with the front forks crafted using hydraulic ram components with springs by Hagon. A rear subframe carries suspension created using two monoshock units from the Yamaha R1 model.

Millyard aims to reach 250 mph (400 km/h) with this bike. In early speed tests, it surpassed 200 mph (320 km/h). The bike has been clocked at 207 mph (333 km/h) at the Bruntingthorpe Proving Ground.

On 25 May 2023, rider Allen Millyard, together with passenger television presenter Henry Cole, achieved the fastest tandem motorcycle world speed record, ratified by Guinness World Records at 183.50 mph (295.31 km/h), beating by two mph the previous record held by an American couple for over 10 years. The record was set using the 9,800 ft (3,000 m) long runway at Elvington Airfield, North Yorkshire, England.

== See also ==
- Boss Hoss
- Dodge Tomahawk
- List of motorcycles by type of engine
- MTT Turbine Superbike
