= Wild Bill Gelbke =

American motorcycle designer

William "Wild Bill" Gelbke
- Born: William A. Gelbke; October 7, 1936; Green Bay, Wisconsin
- Died: November 25, 1978 (Aged 42); Green Bay, Wisconsin
- Education: University of Wisconsin; University of Southern California
- Occupations: aerospace engineer Motorcycle designer

William "Wild Bill" Gelbke (1936–1978, born in Green Bay, Wisconsin) was an American engineer and motorcycle designer. He is noted for having designed and constructed large motorcycles powered by automobile engines, particularly the Roadog and the Auto Four, the latter a motorcycle intended for mass production. Roadog was intended to be featured on an episode of The History Channel's Modern Marvels, however the bit was cut from the episode.

Gelbke worked for McDonnell Douglas and other US Government contractors during the 1960s, most notably on guidance systems for surface to air missiles, however he quit when he was disallowed from viewing the complete plans for the missiles themselves. He then opened his Chicago-area motorcycle shops and began designing and building Roadog and, subsequently, the Auto Four.

In 1978, Gelbke owned a semi-trailer truck as a means of earning income and was suspected by police of transporting marijuana rather than the vegetables he actually hauled; he had also purchased a gun that year. On November 25, 1978, approximately 12 police officers converged on Gelbke's rented farmhouse near Green Bay and issued him commands to throw his gun out the door. Two versions of what happened subsequently emerged: one of the officers, Jack Nagel, stated that Gelbke shot him in the knee, while others stated that Gelbke tossed the gun out just before Nagel slipped on ice and fell down: regardless, the other officers believed Nagel had been shot and opened fire on Gelbke, hitting him multiple times. Nagel was taken to the hospital while Gelbke was allegedly left on the ground to bleed to death. Nagel, apparently uninjured, appeared on TV later the same day, at a Green Bay Packers football game.

Gelbke introduced several firsts to motorcycle design with Roadog, including dual headlights, automatic transmission with reverse gear, anti-dive leading-link "Earles" type front fork, hydraulic stands, and front and rear disc brakes.

== See also ==
- Roadog
- Auto Four
