= Specialty channel =

Television channel which consists of television programming focused on a single genre

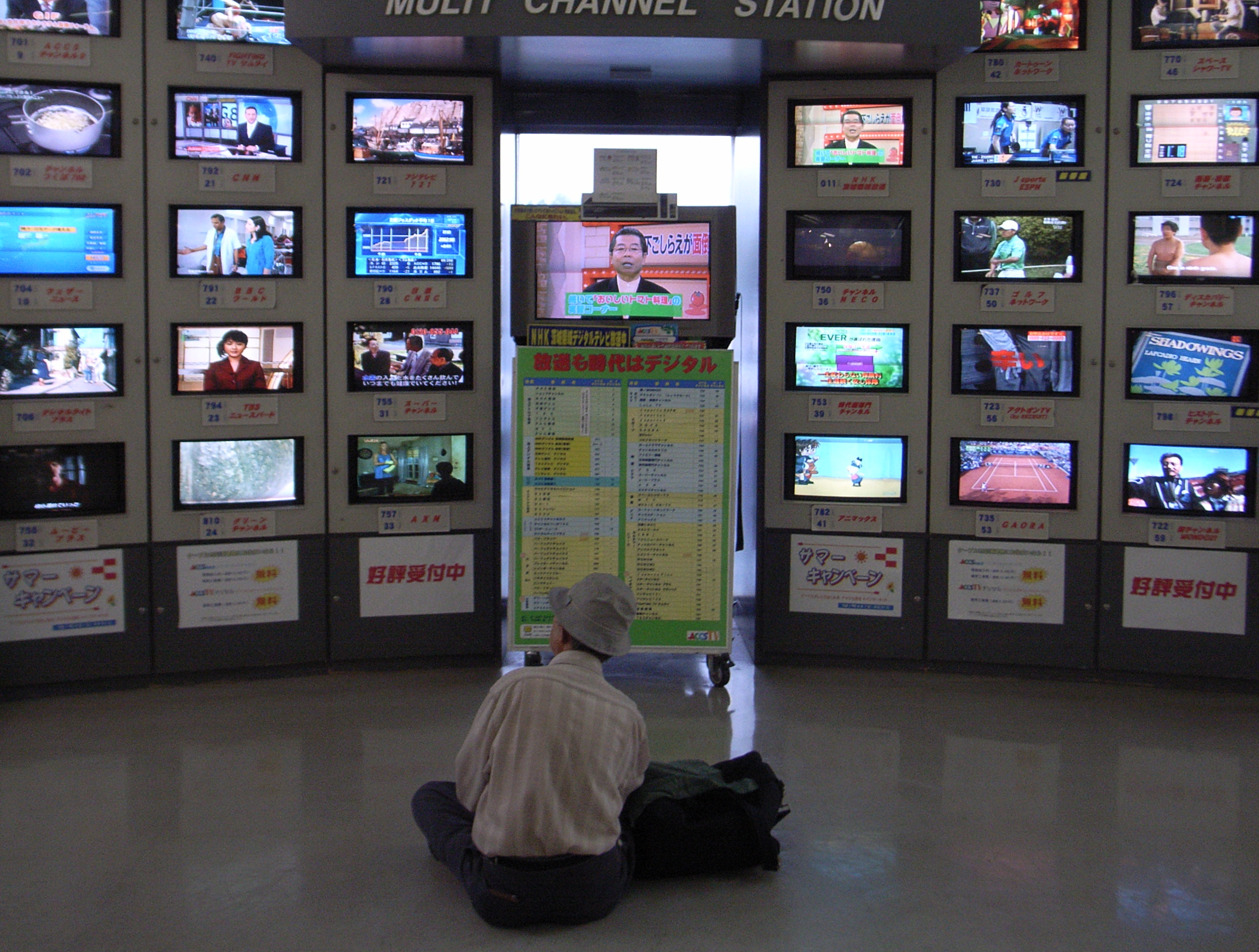
2007 Cable television station in Tsukuba, Ibaraki Pref., Japan

A specialty channel (also known in the United States as a cable channel or cable network) can be a commercial broadcasting or non-commercial television channel which consists of television programming focused on a single genre, subject or targeted television market at a specific demographic.

== History ==
The number of specialty channels greatly increased during the 1990s and 2000s with the increase of broadcast bandwidth and television's transition to digital, while the previously common model of countries having just a few (national) TV stations addressing all interest groups and demographics became increasingly outmoded, as it already had been for some time in several countries. About 65% of today's satellite channels are specialty channels.

Types of specialty services may include, but by no means are limited to:

- Adult channels
- Documentary channels
- Entertainment channels
- Men's interest channels
- Movie channels
- Music channels
- News channels
- Public affairs (broadcasting)
- Public, educational, and government access
- Quiz channels
- Shopping channels
- Sports channels
- Religious broadcasting
- Women's interest channels

(These categories are provided for convenience and do not necessarily represent industry-accepted or otherwise legally binding names or categories for these types of services.)

Some specialty channels may not be free-to-air or may not be available through conventional broadcast or terrestrial television, and are only distributed via multichannel television services such as cable or satellite television. In the United States, such networks are colloquially referred to as cable channels or cable networks (regardless of distribution method), with the most widely distributed referred to as "basic cable" networks (as opposed to those in higher service tiers, or premium services). In the U.S., specialty channels also operate as broadcast television networks designed to be carried on digital subchannels of terrestrial stations (which proliferated following the transition from analog broadcasting), which usually focus on library programming catering to specific themes, genres, or demographics.

== Canadian specialty channels ==
The term "specialty channel" has been used most frequently in Canada, having been used as a marketing term by the cable industry for various simultaneous launches of new channels throughout the 1990s. The Canadian Radio-television and Telecommunications Commission (CRTC) term for such a channel is specialty service (or even more explicitly "specialty television programming undertaking"), referring to virtually any non-premium television service which is not carried over the airwaves or otherwise deemed exempt by the CRTC. They are primarily carried, therefore, on cable television and satellite television.

The CRTC previously enforced strict regulations on the types of programming that may be carried by specialty services, employing minimums and restrictions across specific genres on a per-licence basis, and a category system granting exclusive rights to specific categories of channels. These restrictions were imposed to discourage networks from deviating from the programming format which they were licensed to broadcast. Under a deregulation scheme, the CRTC has since replaced these with streamlined, standard terms for most specialty channels (discretionary services), whose only major restrictions are on the broadcast of live sports programming. Contrarily, a service licensed as a mainstream sports network is restricted in their carriage of non-sport programming.

== See also ==
- Generalist channel
- Pay television
