= Henry Cole (presenter) =

British TV presenter & producer (born 1964)

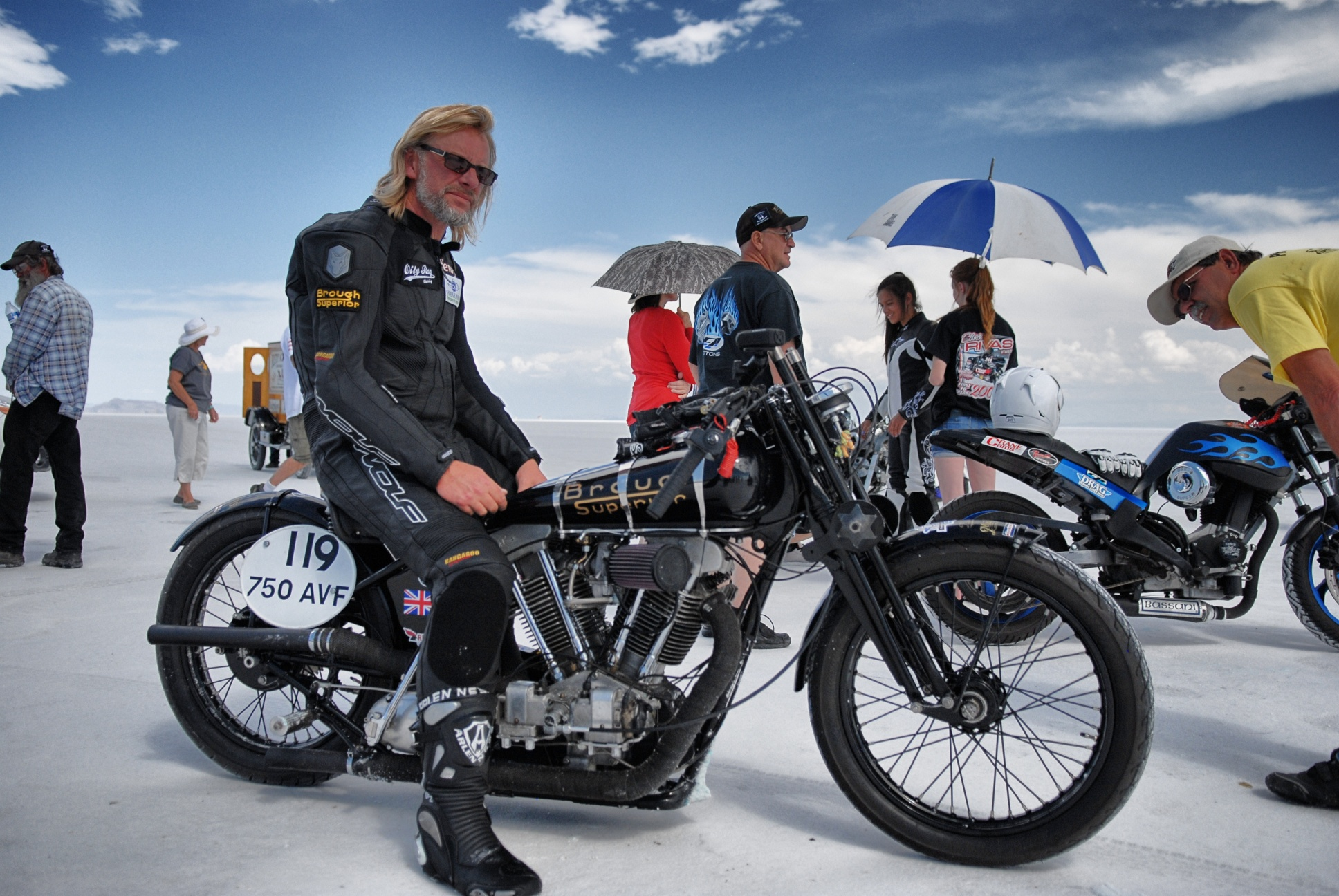
- Henry Cole on the Brough Superior SS100 at the Bonneville Salt Flats in 2013
- Born: February 1964
- Occupations: TV presenter, producer, and director; CEO of Gladstone Motorcycles
- Notable work: World’s Greatest Motorcycle Rides; The Motorbike Show; Shed and Buried; Shed and Buried (Classic Cars); Find It, Fix It, Flog It; Find It, Fix It, Drive It; Junk and Disorderly

Henry Cole (born February 1964) is an English TV presenter, producer and director. On television he is best known for World’s Greatest Motorcycle Rides, The Motorbike Show, Shed and Buried, Junk & Disorderly and Find It, Fix It, Flog It. Many of these feature custom bike engineer Allen Millyard and lifelong friend Guy Willison, and in the main are produced by his own production company, HCA Entertainment. Cole is also the founder and CEO of bespoke motorcycle manufacturer Gladstone Motorcycles, named after his great-uncle Dick "Red Beard" Gladstone.

== Early life ==
Cole was born in February 1964. His great-great-great-great-uncle was William Ewart Gladstone, the former Prime Minister of the United Kingdom. He was educated at Eton College, where he was a contemporary of Boris Johnson. He was a heroin addict for five years, but has been clean since 1988.

== Career ==
He started as a news cameraman for channels including ITV and TF1. He progressed to making rockumentaries, primarily with heavy rock bands, then directing TV commercials, and finally directing films, such as the semi-autobiographical Mad Dogs and Englishmen with Elizabeth Hurley. After the failure of Mad Dogs and Englishmen at the box office, Cole pitched to Channel 5 a new programme, Stars and Cars, but wanted to host it. Channel 5 were not keen, so Cole offered to make a pilot first Christmas special for free, and if it rated they would commission the series. The programme was a success and ran for 5 years.

=== HCA Entertainment ===
Founded by Cole in 1995, HCA Entertainment is an independent television production company, specialising in factual entertainment programmes that have appeared on ITV, Channel 4, Channel 5, Discovery and Quest in the UK. Programmes produced by HCA and directed by Cole include:

- Grime Fighters
- Kensington Wives
- Men Brewing Badly
- London's Greatest Hits
- Supersize Grime
- The Skulls of Sanctuary
- Frontline Stories
- Discovering Gardens
- The Real Filth Fighters

=== List of presented TV programmes ===
Cole has presented the following programmes made by HCA:

- Stars and Cars - Channel 5 1996-2000
- The Motorbike Show - ITV4 2011-onwards
- World’s Greatest Motorcycle Rides - Travel Channel International 2012-2015
- Shed and Buried - Travel Channel International / Discovery Channel 2015-onwards
- Find it, Fix it, Flog it - Channel 4 / Quest / U&Yesterday 2016 onwards
- Find It, Fix It, Drive It - More4
- Junk & Disorderly - Blaze & ITV4
- The Great British Treasure Hunt - ITV4

== World records ==
In 2013 Cole set a world land speed record for a pre-1955 750cc motorcycle, riding a Brough Superior at 99.78mph on the Bonneville Salt Flats.

On 25 May 2023 Cole rode pillion with Allen Millyard on his Viper V10 home-built motorcycle at Elvington airfield in North Yorkshire, to set a new Guinness World Record for the “fastest tandem motorcycle”. Their top speed of 183.5 miles per hour (295.3 km/h) gave them a clear margin over American couple Erin Hunter and Andy Sills, who reached 181.42 miles per hour (291.97 km/h) at Bonneville Salt Flats in 2011.

== Books ==
Henry Cole has written three books: A Biker's Life (2018) and The Life-Changing Magic of Sheds (2020). Riding Route 66 (2024)

== Personal life ==
Between the age of 19 and 24, Cole battled an addiction to Heroin. He is married to Janie, and has two sons, Charlie and Tom. Cole's Norwich Terrier dogs, Jelly Bean and Jelly Tot, appear on many of his TV programmes. In September 2026, Cole announced that he had been diagnosed with stomach cancer and was to undergo an operation to remove it.
