= Roadog =

- Manufacturer: Wild Bill Gelbke
- Production: 1965
- Engine: 153.3 cu in (2,512 cc) Chevrolet I-4
- Bore / stroke: 3.875 in (98.425 mm); 3.25 in (82.55 mm)
- Transmission: 2-speed Powerglide
- Dimensions: L: 17 feet (520 cm)
- Weight: 3,280 pounds (1,490 kg) (dry)

Roadog is a motorcycle built by engineer and motorcycle enthusiast Wild Bill Gelbke between 1962 and 1965. A total of two were built. Gelbke, who had attended engineering school in Wisconsin and at University of Southern California, had worked for McDonnell Douglas and also owned two motorcycle shops in Chicago and Hammond, Indiana. He wanted to create a motorcycle that was dependable and was able to cruise at highway speeds comfortably for long periods. Gelbe constructed and welded the frame himself using 4130 chrome-molybdenum tubing, and equipped the machine with a Chevrolet 153 engine and GM powerglide transmission. The shaft drive was constructed from a Chevrolet 1-ton truck differential that was cut in half. The complete bike is 17 feet (520 cm) long and weighs 3,280 pounds (1,490 kg). Its great size and weight make the bike impossible for most people to steer until it is moving at a speed of at least 15 miles per hour (24 km/h), and when at rest it is held up by hydraulic rams that are deployed by the driver.

Gelbke was known for riding the bike up and down Cicero Avenue and Addison Street in Chicago in the 1960s, and he made regular cross-country trips on it from 1966 through 1978, logging over 20,000 miles in one year. When he was killed by police in 1978, the bikes were put into storage. Posters depicting Gelbke on a Roadog were a popular item among classic motorcycle enthusiasts; in the mid-1980s, motorcycle enthusiast and swap meet organizer Buzz Walneck began searching for the motorcycle, finally placing an ad in his monthly magazine Walneck's Classic Cycle Trader, receiving a tip and discovering a bike at the home of Gelbke's mother. He purchased it and has displayed it at his swap meets and motorcycle shows. Walnek later sold his bike to the National Motorcycle Museum, where it was on display until being sold at auction in 2023. The other Roadog is privately owned by a Wisconsin man named Anthony Shablak, who "bought it to ride it" but has been unable to find an insurer to cover it.

Roadog introduced several firsts to motorcycle design, including dual headlights, automatic transmission with reverse gear, the hydraulic stands, and front and rear disc brakes. In 2001, Roadog was displayed in a special exhibit at the Museum of Science and Industry in Chicago.

The Roadog was offered for sale at an auction which took place on September 9, 2023, in Anamosa, Iowa.

It was later purchased on a second chance offer by Sean Kerr of the YouTube channel Bikes and Beards, announced via YouTube video on October 20, 2023. Kerr brought the Roadog to Matt Walksler of the Wheels Through Time Motorcycle Museum to refurbish it to running and driving condition. Kerr won the honors of first driving the bike, then Walksler, with the latter referring to the experience as "the scariest thing [he's] ever done".

Walksler ended up buying the bike from Kerr, and the Roadog is currently displayed at Wheels Through Time Museum.
