= Gunbus 410 =

Motorcycle produced by Leonhardt Manufacturing

- Manufacturer: Leonhardt Manufacturing
- Engine: 410 cu in (6,700 cc) 45-degree V-twin
- Power: 350 PS (260 kW) (claimed)
- Torque: 710 N⋅m (520 lbf⋅ft) @ 1,900 RPM
- Transmission: Three forward speeds plus reverse; chain drive
- Brakes: Front: 2x310 mm (12 in) disc Rear: 310 mm disc
- Dimensions: L: 3.5 m (11 ft)
- Weight: 650 kg (1,430 lb) (dry)

The Gunbus 410 is a motorcycle produced by German company Leonhardt Manufacturing, and is described as "the world's biggest running motorcycle". The Gunbus 410 is 3.47 m (11.4 ft) long and is powered by a 410 in^{3} (6,700 cm^{3}) V-twin engine. The motorcycle's front wheel including its tire is 38 in (97 cm) in diameter and 11 in (28 cm) wide, and the rear wheel including its tire is 42 in (110 cm) in diameter and 15 in (38 cm) wide. The price of a Gunbus 410 production model is reported as US$350,000.

== See also ==
- Dodge Tomahawk
- Bi-Autogo
- List of motorcycles by type of engine
