= Dodge Kahuna =

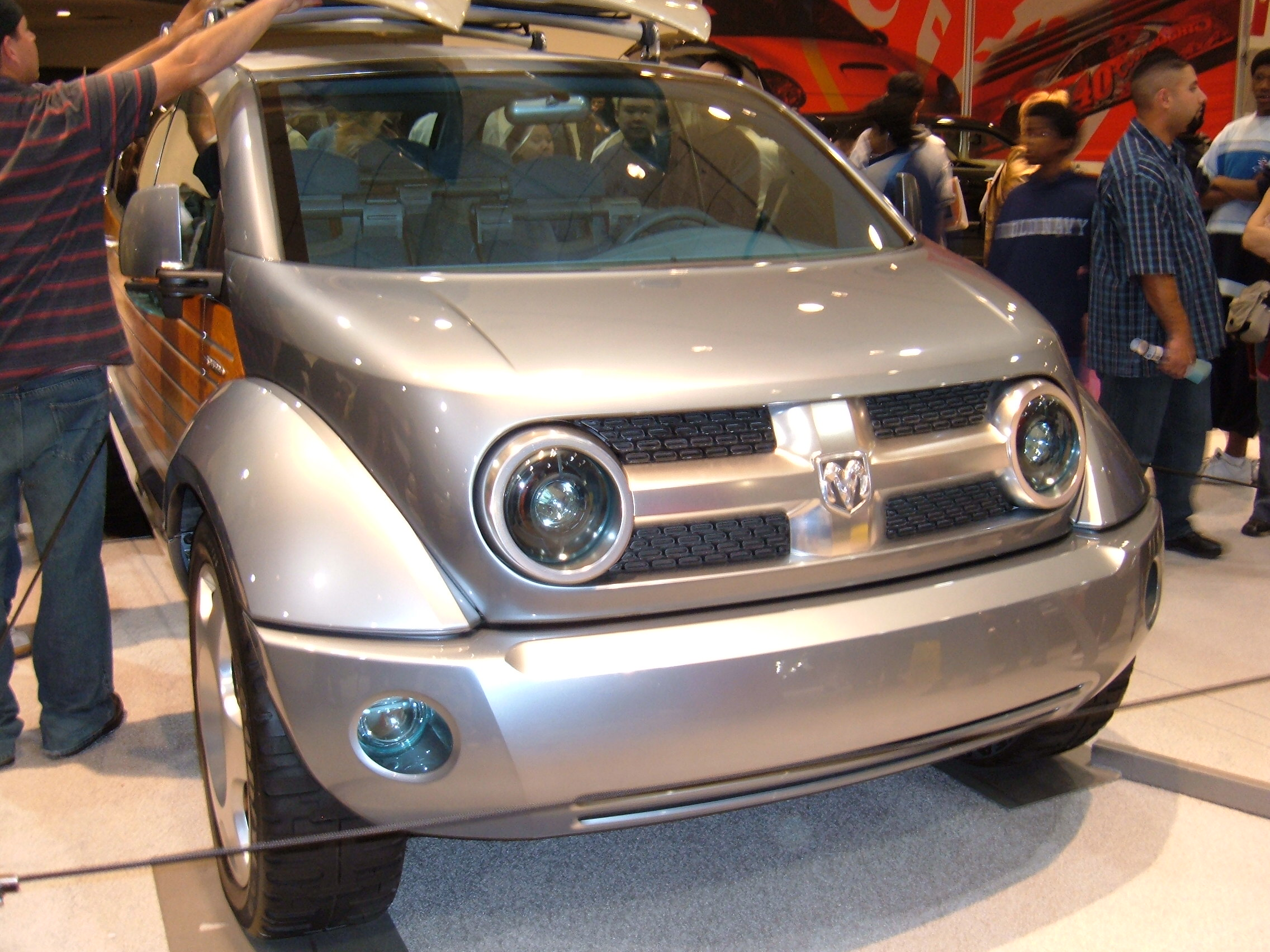
- The Dodge Kahuna at the 2004 San Francisco International Auto Show

Overview
- Manufacturer: Dodge (Chrysler)
- Production: 2003

Body and chassis
- Class: Concept car
- Body style: 4-door minivan

Powertrain
- Engine: 2.4 L turbocharged I4
- Transmission: 4-speed automatic

The Dodge Kahuna was a concept minivan manufactured by Dodge and introduced at the 2003 Detroit Auto Show alongside the Dodge Avenger Concept. It was aimed to the surfers.

== Features ==
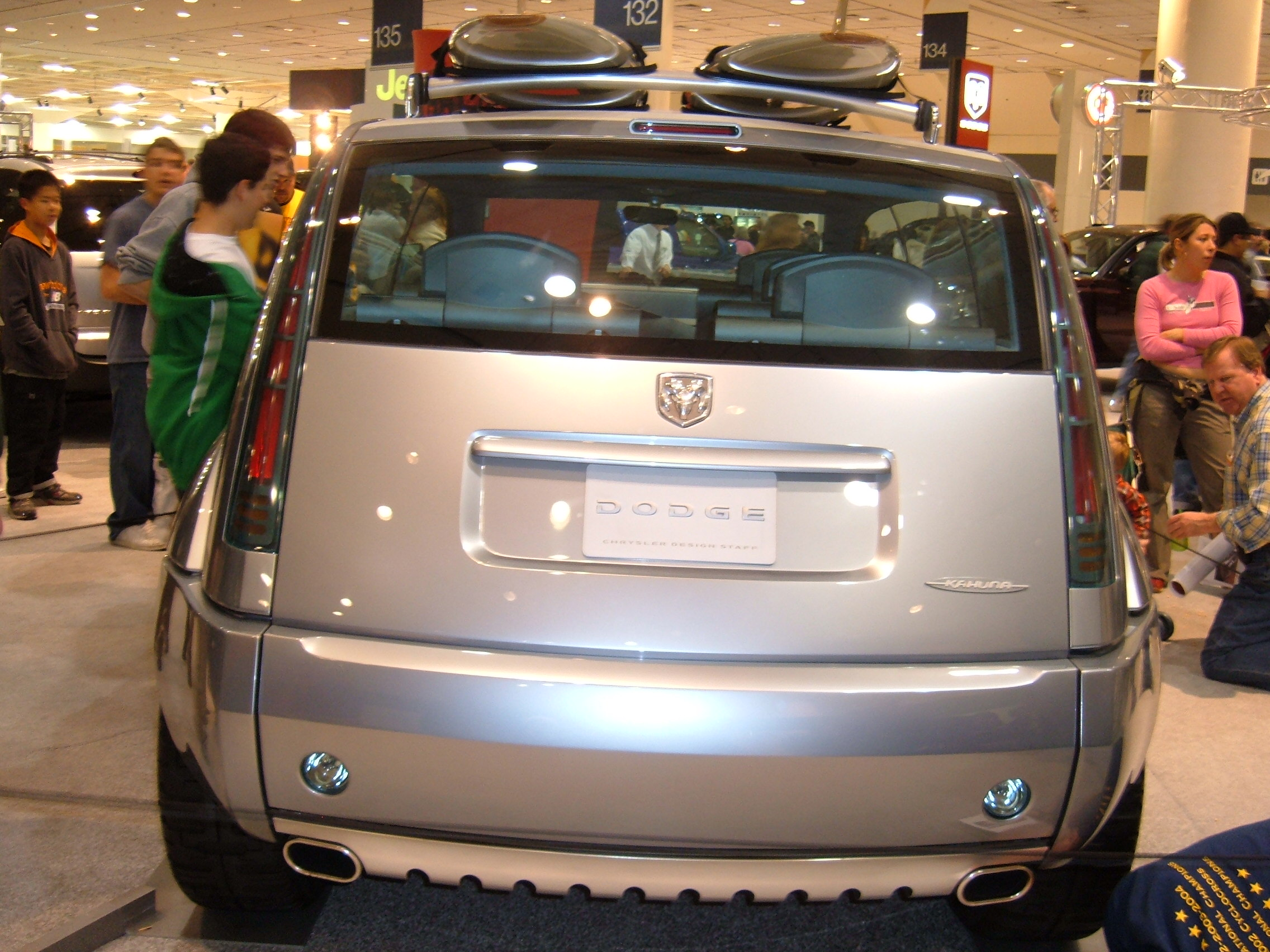
The rear of a Dodge Kahuna

The Kahuna featured a Pacific Blue exterior and three rows of flexible seats — a variation of the Stow N' Go seating introduced by Chrysler on its minivans in 2005. The roof rails were intended for placing the surfboards.

== Specifications ==
The Kahuna was powered by a turbocharged 2.4 L straight-4 engine (rated at 215 hp) paired with a 4-speed automatic transmission. Most components in the Kahuna were based on the company's minivans.
