= Wolfgang Bernhard =

Former member of the Board of Management of Daimler AG

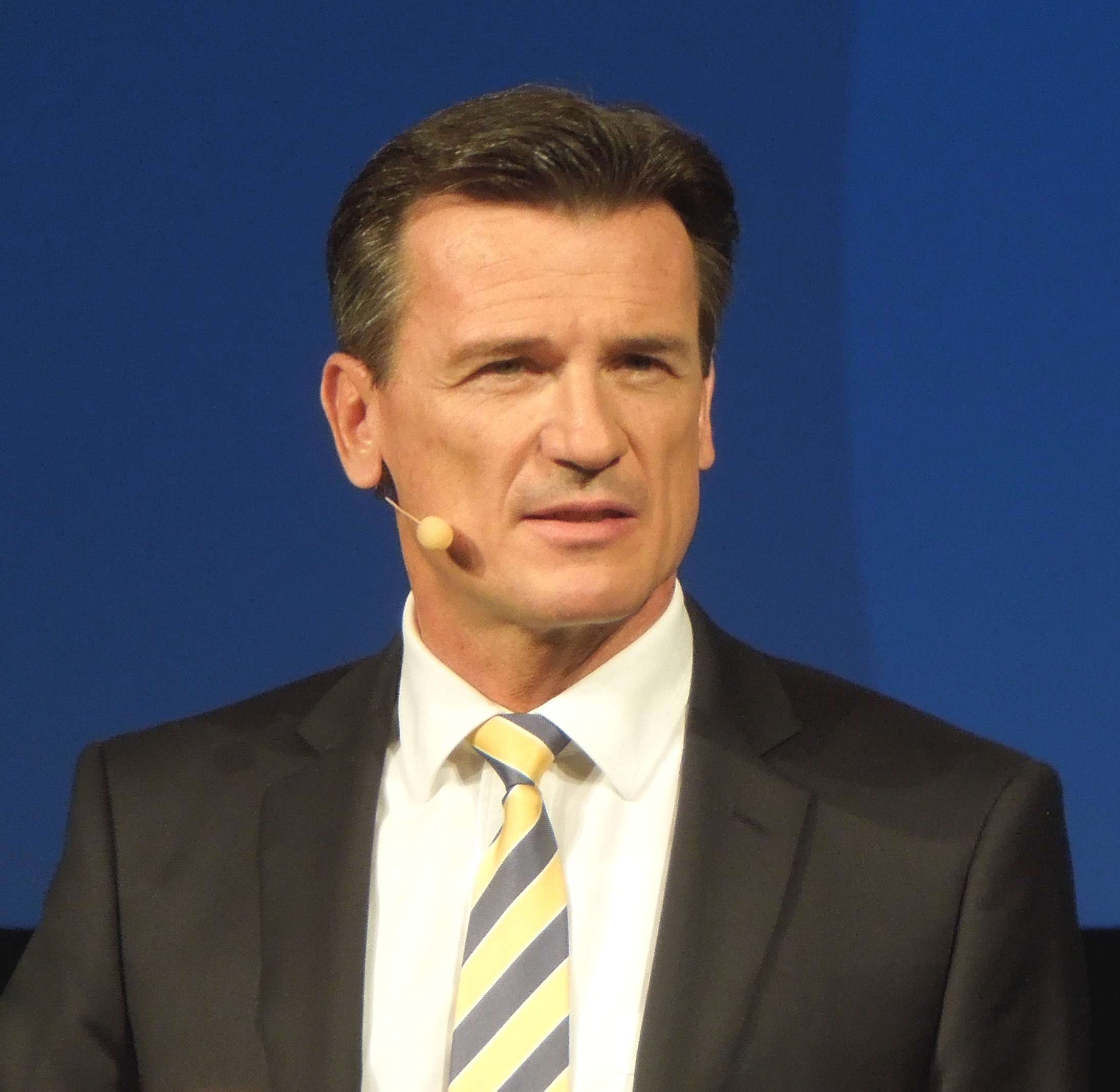
Bernhard Wolfgang in 2014

Wolfgang Bernhard (born 3 September 1960) is a German business executive known as a former member of the Board of Management of Daimler AG. He served as the former president and COO of Chrysler from 2000 to 2004.

== Early life ==
Bernhard was born Wolfgang Ayerle on 3 September 1960 in Böhen, Germany. He grew up as one of nine children and later took his mother's maiden name. He earned a master's degree in electrical engineering and economics from Technische Universität Darmstadt in 1986, an MBA from Columbia Business School in 1988, and a doctorate in economics from Johann Wolfgang Goethe University in 1990.

== Career ==
After obtaining his doctorate degree, Bernhard joined McKinsey & Company in 1990 as a management consultant. In this capacity, he was assigned to Mercedes-Benz. In 1992, he joined Mercedes-Benz AG. Bernhard became CEO of Mercedes-AMG in 1999. Following the merger of Daimler-Benz and Chrysler in 1998, Bernhard was appointed president and COO of the Chrysler division in 2000. He continued in the position until he was slated to become the head of the Mercedes-Benz group in May 2004, but was passed over for the job just a day before his official switch. Bernhard subsequently resigned. Bernhard then served as the CEO of the Volkswagen brand for Volkswagen AG from 2005 to 2007. He was ousted from this position in January 2007 by Ferdinand Piech. Bernhard then rejoined Daimler in April 2009, and was on the Board of Management member responsible for commercial vehicles since February 18, 2010. He became Head of Daimler Trucks and Buses Division on April 1, 2013.

On 9 February 2017, Wolfgang Bernhard announced that he would not renew his contract with Daimler in January 2018. On 10 February, Daimler let him go.

In February 2019 Bernhard replace Franz Gasselsberger on the supervisory board of Austrian aluminium group AMAG.
