= Men's interest channel =

Type of television channel catering to men

A men's interest channel generally refers to either a television station, network or specialty channel that targets men as its main demographic; offering programs that appeal to the male population.

There are two types of male interest channels: general interest and niche interest.

== General interest ==
General interest men's channels are television channels that contain programming from diverse genres and categories that will appeal to the male population. Categories include, but are not limited to: Films, lifestyle, drama, action, reality TV, and talk shows. Other topics include cooking, travel, cars, sex, and sports.

== Niche interest ==
Niche interest men's channels are television channels that contain programming with a specific genre, mainly that involving motoring, adult entertainment, and styling, though they are also subject to channel drift if their specific audience does not rate well to encompass a general audience that includes women.
