= Boss Hoss Cycles =

American motorcycle manufacturer

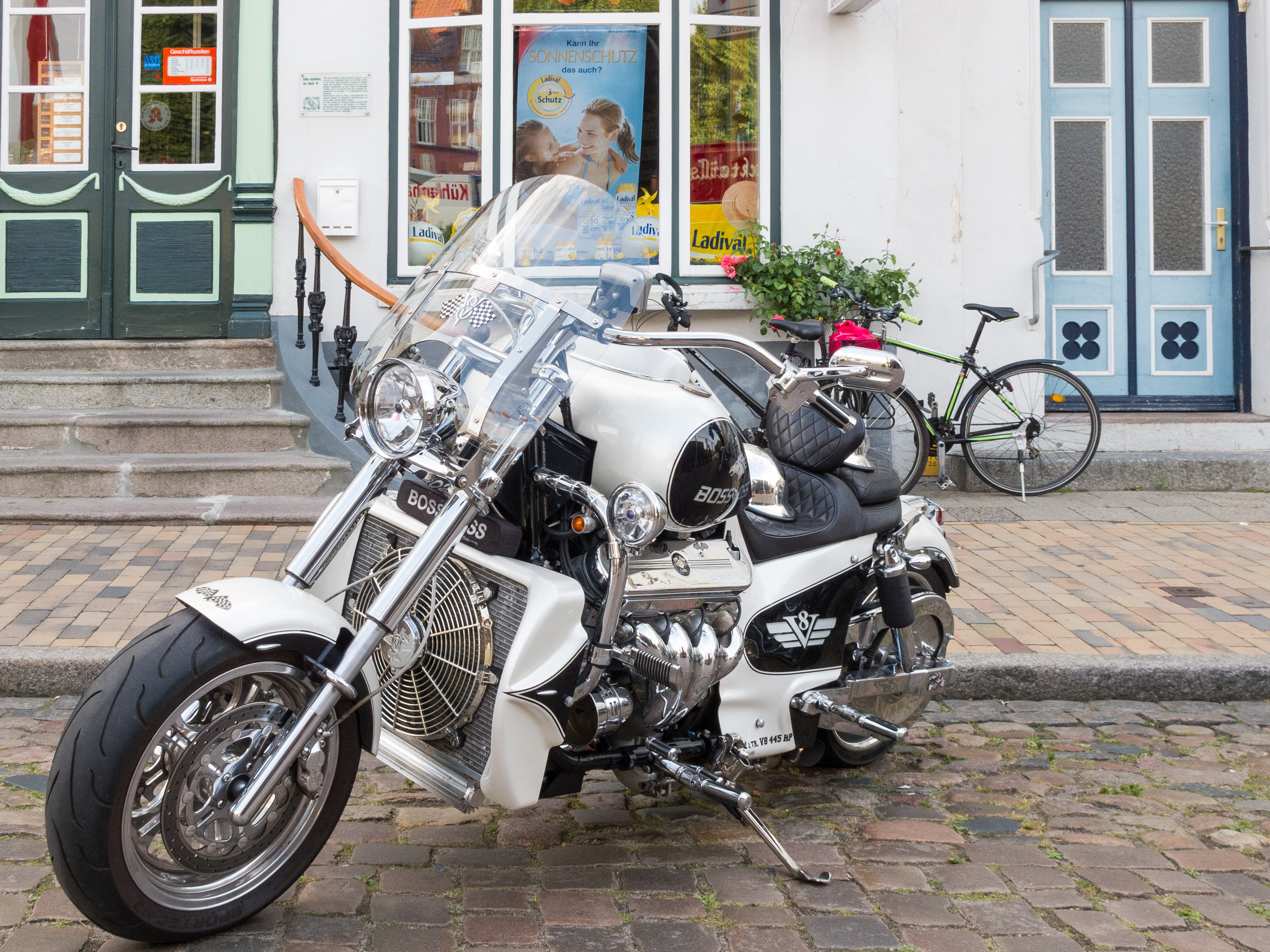
- A Boss Hoss motorcycle
- Type: Private company
- Founded: 1990
- Founder: Monte Warne
- Headquarters: Dyersburg, Tennessee
- Products: Motorcycles
- Website: bosshoss.com

Boss Hoss Cycles is an American motorcycle manufacturer founded by Monte Warne in 1990 and based in Dyersburg, Tennessee.

== Overview ==
The company manufactures motorcycles and motorized tricycles powered by Chevrolet V8 engines with displacements ranging from 376 to 496 cu in (6,160 to 8,130 cm^{3}), paired with semi-automatic transmissions. By the mid-1990s, Boss Hoss was selling approximately 300 vehicles per year. As of 2006, the company had sold more than 4,000 vehicles.

Boss Hoss motorcycles' and tricycles' mass has a vibration damping effect, which combined with having eight engine cylinders and the very tall gears of the semi-automatic transmission results in what has been described as "vibration-free acceleration".

== See also ==
- Millyard Viper V10
- Motorcycling
