= Devon Motorworks =

Defunct American motor vehicle manufacturer

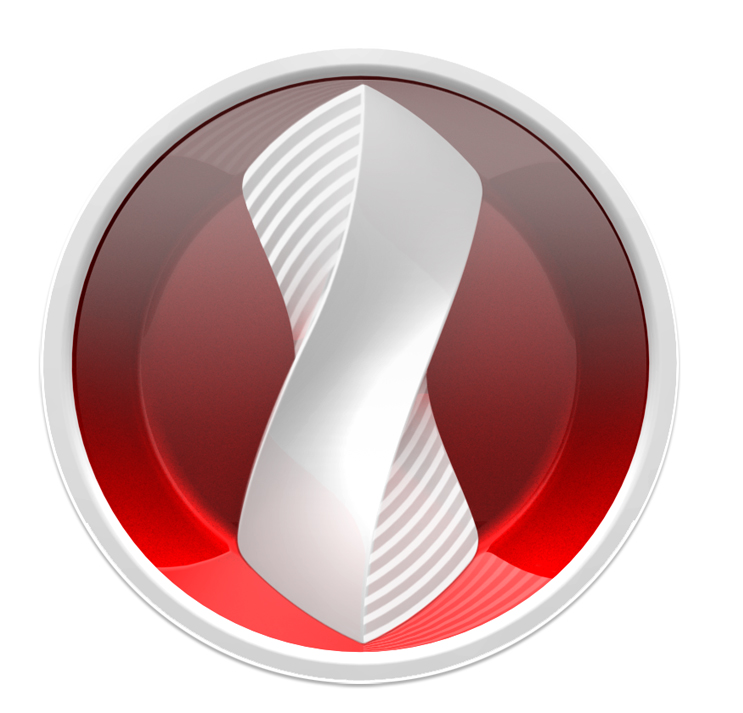
- Type: Private
- Industry: Industrial Design
- Founded: 2008
- Founder: Scott Devon
- Defunct: 2013
- Headquarters: Los Angeles, CA, United States
- Key people: Scott Devon, Andy Benedict, Justin Bell, Daniel Paulin, Jason Wilbur, Dr. Joseph Katz, Aria Group, Jerry Deeney

Devon Motorworks was an American car brand based in Los Angeles, California. The company was known for being the sole bidder for the Dodge Viper.

== Company ==
Devon GTX
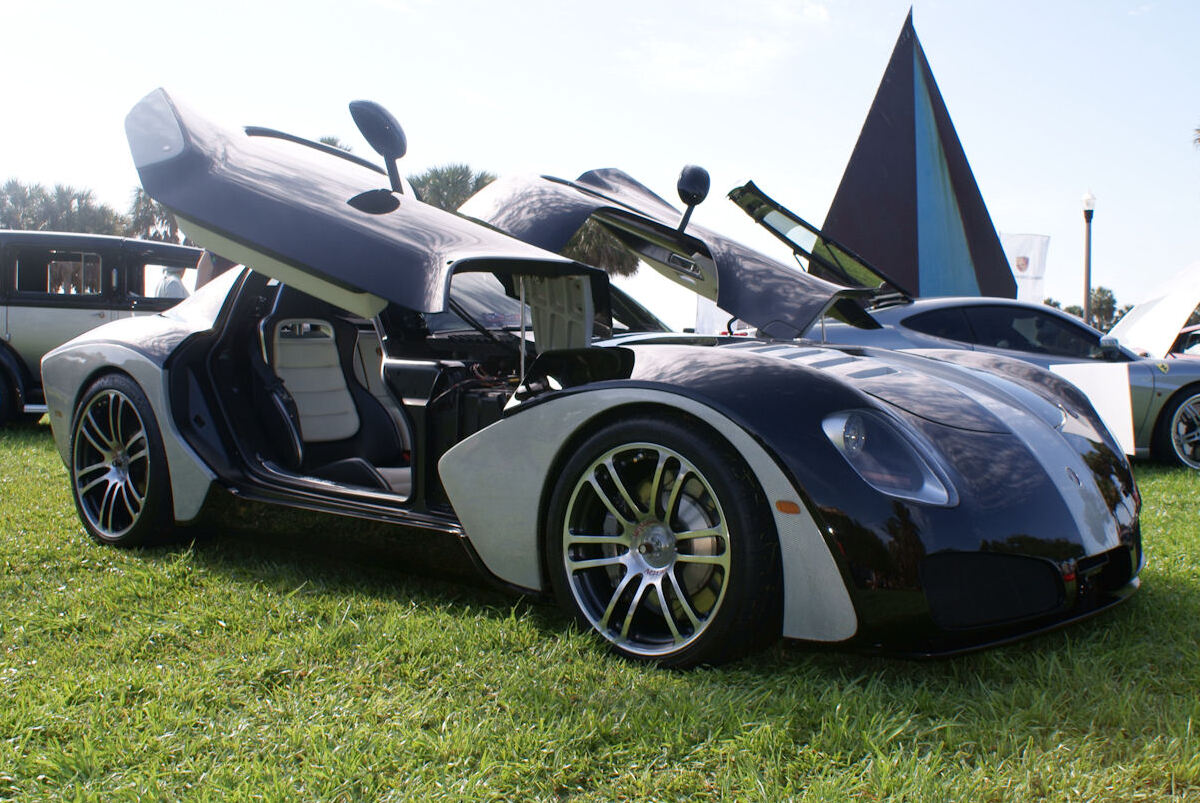

Overview
- Production: 2009-2012

Body and chassis
- Class: Sports car (S)
- Body style: 2-door liftback coupé
- Layout: Front mid-engine, rear-wheel-drive
- Platform: Dodge Viper
- Related: Dodge Viper; Bristol Fighter; Chrysler Firepower; Alfa Romeo Zagato TZ3

Powertrain
- Engine: 8.4 L Viper V10
- Transmission: 6-speed Tremec TR6060 manual

Dimensions
- Wheelbase: 98.8 in (2,510 mm)
- Length: 172.2 in (4,370 mm)
- Width: 78.5 in (1,990 mm)
- Height: 48.4 in (1,230 mm)
- Curb weight: 3,460 lb (1,570 kg)

Founded in 2008 by entrepreneur Scott Devon, Devon Motorworks' stated focus is to undertake "multiple design projects that have a common purpose of providing sculptural power with recognizable beauty." Devon's initial production vehicle, the Devon GTX super car, was scheduled to begin production in early 2010, however, economic downturn shelved production.

Devon Motorworks made news for being the single bidder for Chrysler's Dodge Viper platform, originally intended to provide the basis for the Devon GTX. The bid was, however, rejected by Chrysler for being below the US$10.0 million reserve and with the fourth-generation Viper upon which the GTX was derived being discontinued, Devon Motorworks was closed.

== Products ==
The initial product, Devon GTX, was unveiled at the 2009 Pebble Beach Concours d'Elegance. The vehicle was conceived by Swedish designer Daniel Paulin and Devon Motor Works Founder Scott Devon, who shared a vision for an American supercar that combined classic and contemporary design cues.

The distinguishing features of the Devon GTX included an aircraft-quality carbon fiber body, “up and forward” articulating doors, two-tone wheel surrounds, minimal front/rear overhangs, dual center exhaust ports and carbon fiber racing seats.

In validation testing, the vehicle set an unofficial lap record at California's Willow Springs Raceway. Following subsequent testing, spy photos of the prototype appeared online.

Product development for the Devon GTX was led by former Ford executive engineer Andy Benedict, while assembly and manufacturing was headed by Clive Hawkins, founder of the Aria Group. Aerodynamic testing was supervised by Dr. Joseph Katz, Chairman of the Department of Aerospace Engineering and Engineering Mechanics at San Diego State University. Vehicle validation and testing was handled by former 24 Hours of Le Mans champion Justin Bell.

Two GTX cars were completed before production ceased, with one selling for $220,000 at a Barrett-Jackson auction in 2012.

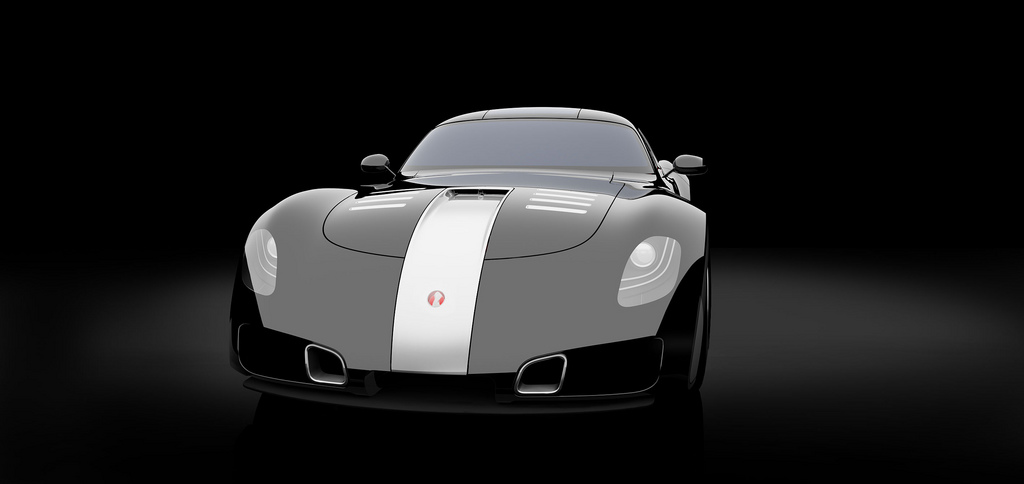
Devon GTX front view

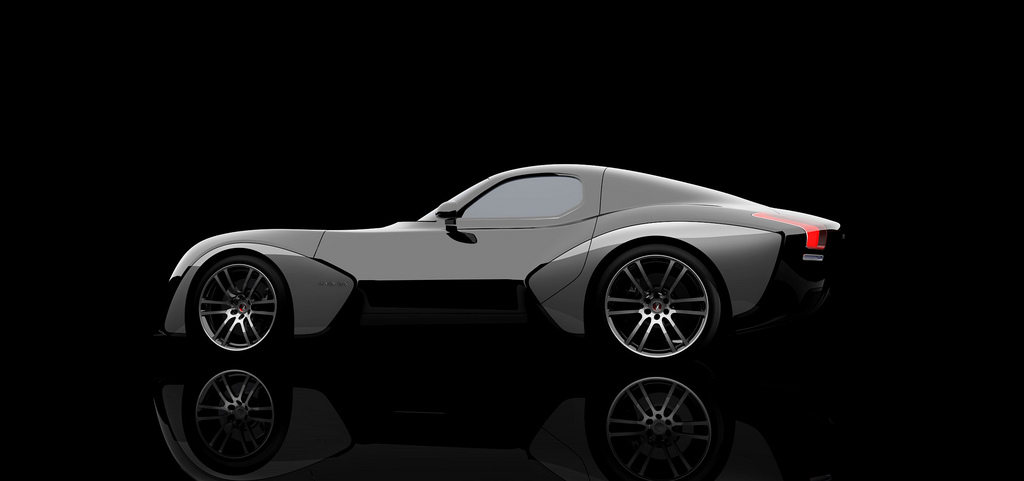
Devon GTX side view

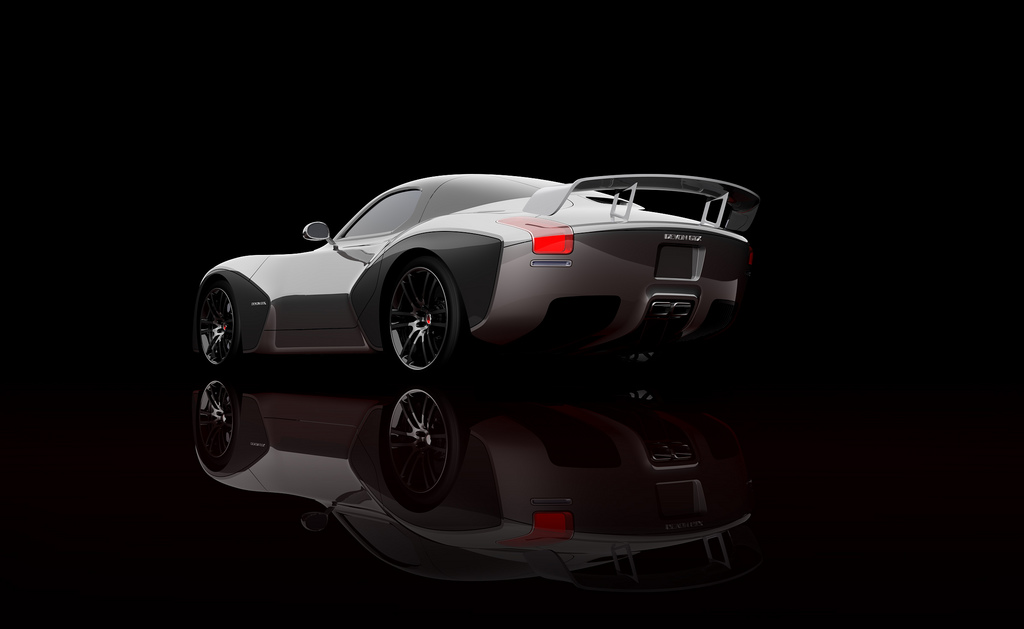
Devon GTX rear view

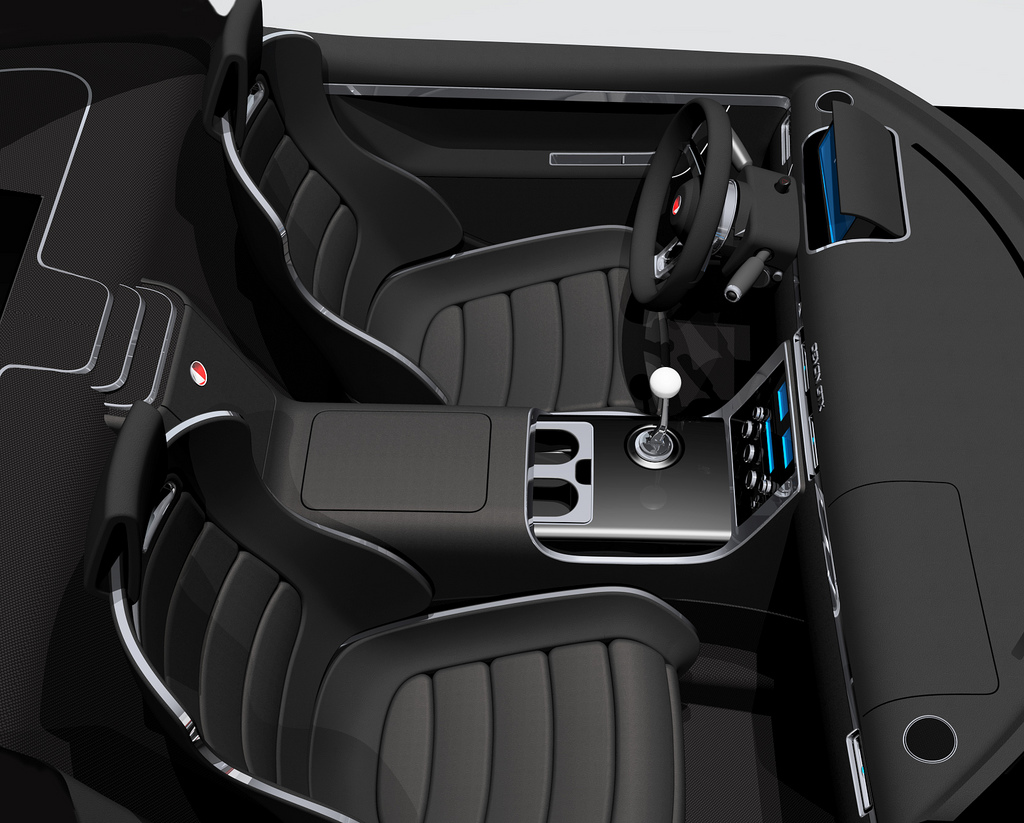
Devon GTX interior view
