= Chrysler Firepower =

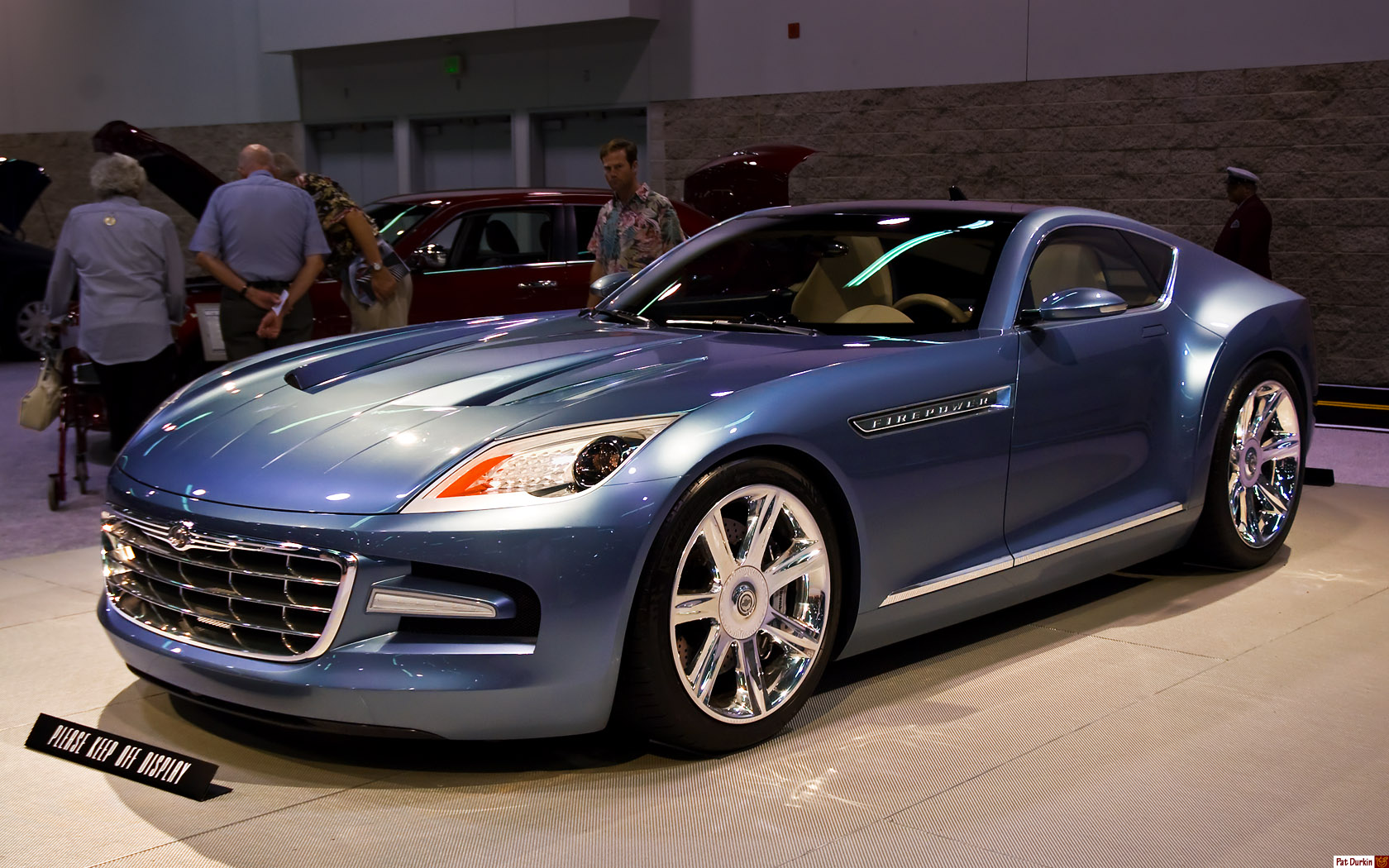

Overview
- Manufacturer: Chrysler
- Production: 2005
- Designer: Brian Nielander (exterior); Greg Howell (interior)

Body and chassis
- Class: Concept car
- Body style: 2-door coupé
- Layout: FR
- Platform: Dodge Viper
- Related: Dodge Viper; Devon GTX; Alfa Romeo Zagato TZ3; Bristol Fighter

Powertrain
- Engine: 6.1 L Hemi V8
- Transmission: 5-speed automatic with Autostick

The Chrysler Firepower is a Dodge Viper-based concept car manufactured by Chrysler in 2005. It takes some of the styling cues from the Chrysler Crossfire. The car was once featured on the cover of Car and Driver.

== Design ==
Designers responsible for the design were Brian Nielander (exterior), who also worked on the ME-412 concept; and Greg Howell (interior).

== Specifications and performance ==
The Firepower was powered by the 6.1 L Hemi V8 engine producing 425 hp (317 kW) and 425 lb⋅ft (576 N⋅m) of torque paired with a 5-speed manumatic shifting automatic transmission allowing it to accelerate from 0–60 mph (0–97 km/h) in 4.5 seconds and had a top speed of 174 mph (280 km/h).

== Plans for production ==
The Firepower Concept was built to prove that Chrysler could indeed build a hybrid car using existing hardware. Signs early in 2006 pointed to the Firepower going into production using the same hardware as the concept, but later that year Chrysler officially announced that the Firepower would not be produced, as they could not find a viable way of doing so.

== Gallery ==
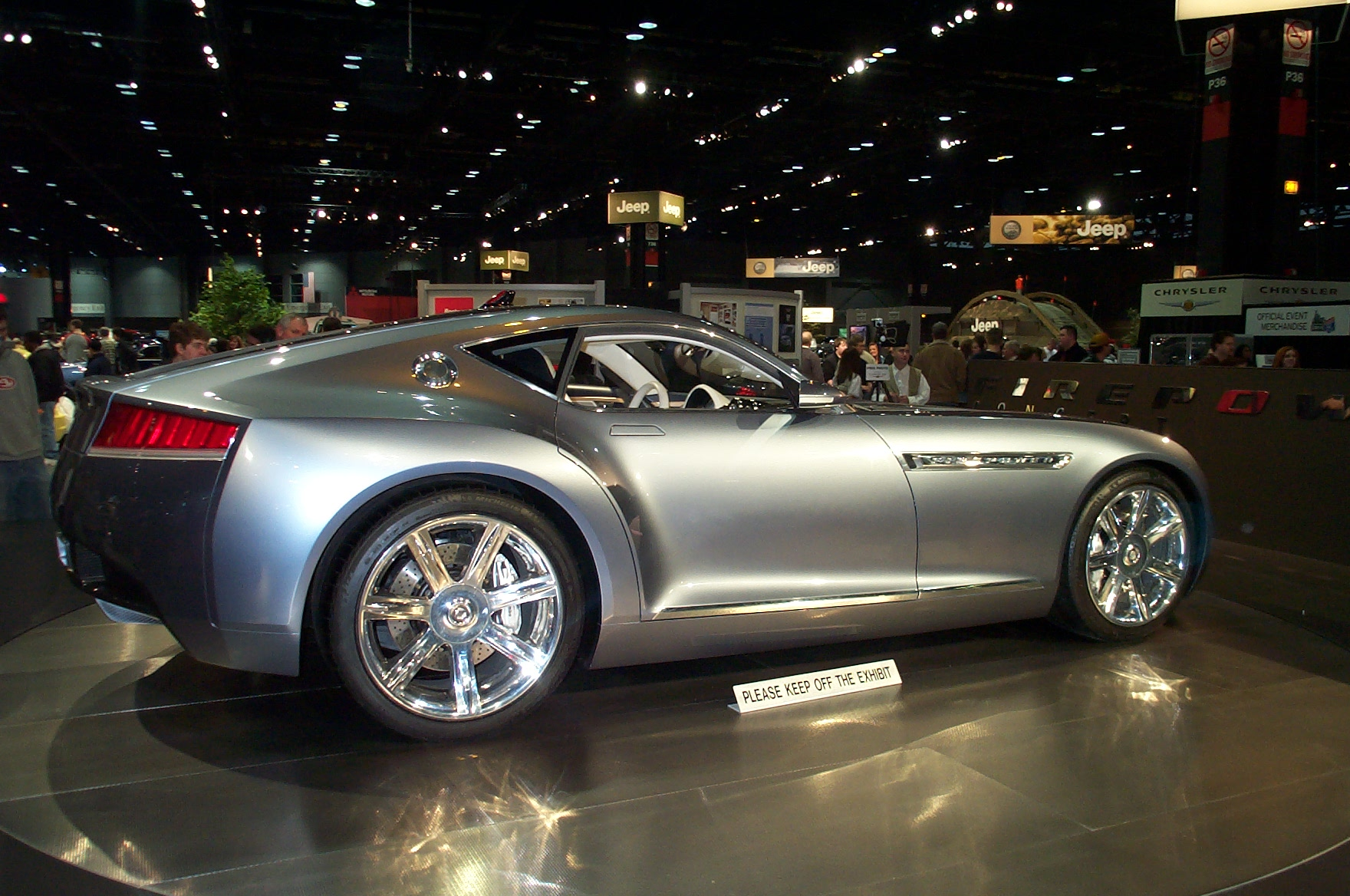
The Chrysler Firepower at the 2005 Chicago Auto Show.

== See also ==
- "Chrysler gives us a look at Firepower Concept"
