= Bristol Fighter =

Bristol Fighter may refer to:

- Bristol F.2 Fighter aircraft
- Bristol Fighter (automobile), an automobile by Bristol Cars
