= Dodge Viper (ZB II) =

Dodge Viper SRT-10 (ZB II)
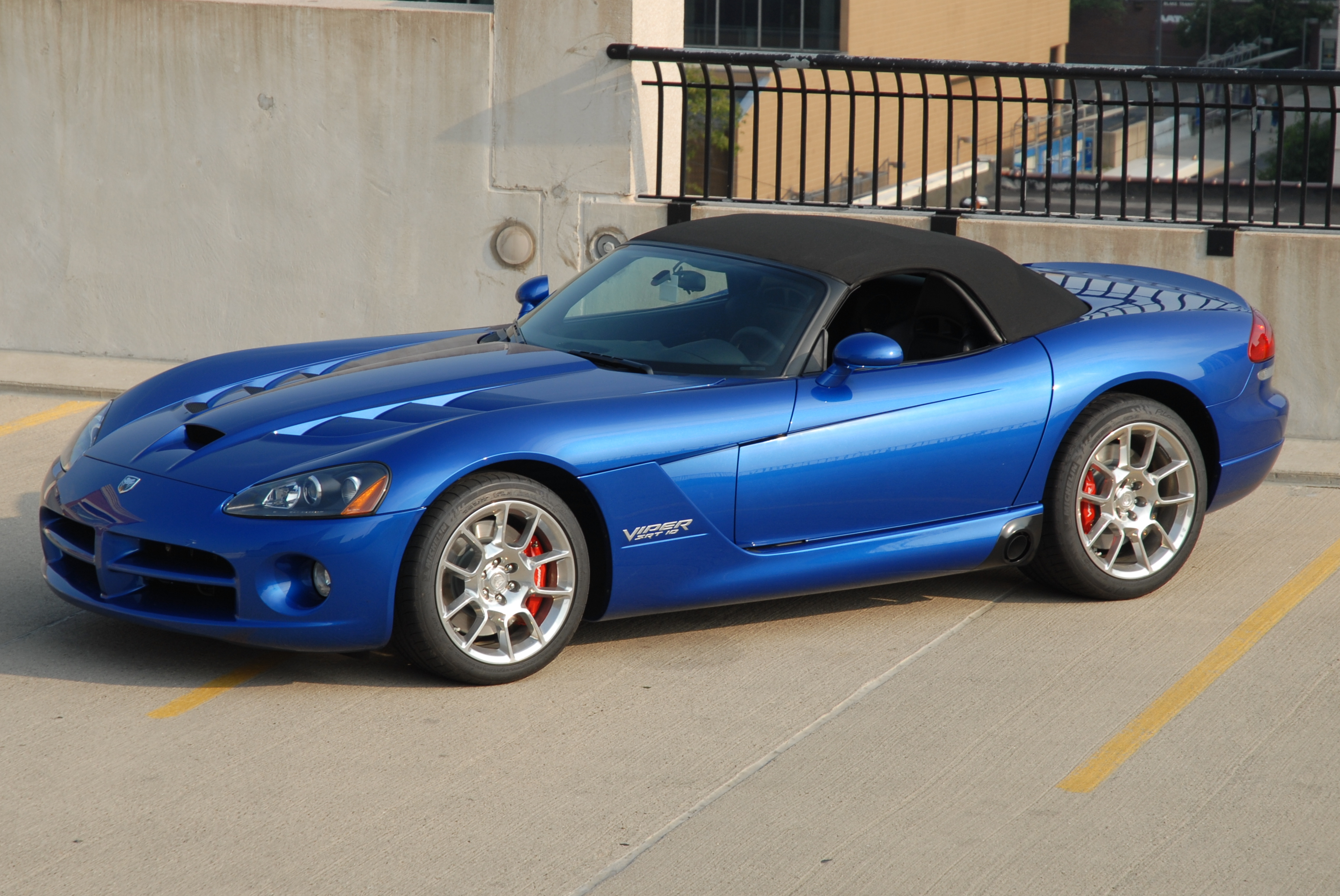
- 2008 Dodge Viper convertible

Overview
- Manufacturer: Chrysler LLC; Chrysler Group LLC
- Production: 2007–2010; 2,481 units
- Model years: 2008–2010
- Assembly: Conner Avenue Assembly, Detroit, Michigan, United States

Body and chassis
- Class: Sports car (S)
- Body style: 2-door roadster 2-door liftback coupé
- Related: Devon GTX; Chrysler Firepower; Alfa Romeo Zagato TZ3; Bristol Fighter

Powertrain
- Engine: Odd firing 8.4 L (512 cu in) Viper EWE V10
- Power output: 600 hp (608 PS; 447 kW) at 6,000 rpm 560 lb⋅ft (759 N⋅m) at 4,600 rpm
- Transmission: 6-speed Tremec TR6060 manual

Dimensions
- Wheelbase: 98.8 in (2,510 mm)
- Length: 175.6 in (4,460 mm)
- Width: 75.7 in (1,920 mm)
- Height: Coupé: 47.6 in (1,210 mm); Convertible: 48.6 in (1,230 mm)
- Curb weight: SRT-10: 3,460 lb (1,569 kg); ACR: 3,408 lb (1,546 kg)

Chronology
- Predecessor: Dodge Viper (ZB I)
- Successor: Dodge Viper (VX I)

The Dodge Viper SRT-10 (ZB II) is the fourth-generation Viper sports car. Introduced at the 2007 North American International Auto Show, the car was similar to its predecessor on the exterior but had undergone notable mechanical changes.

== History and development ==
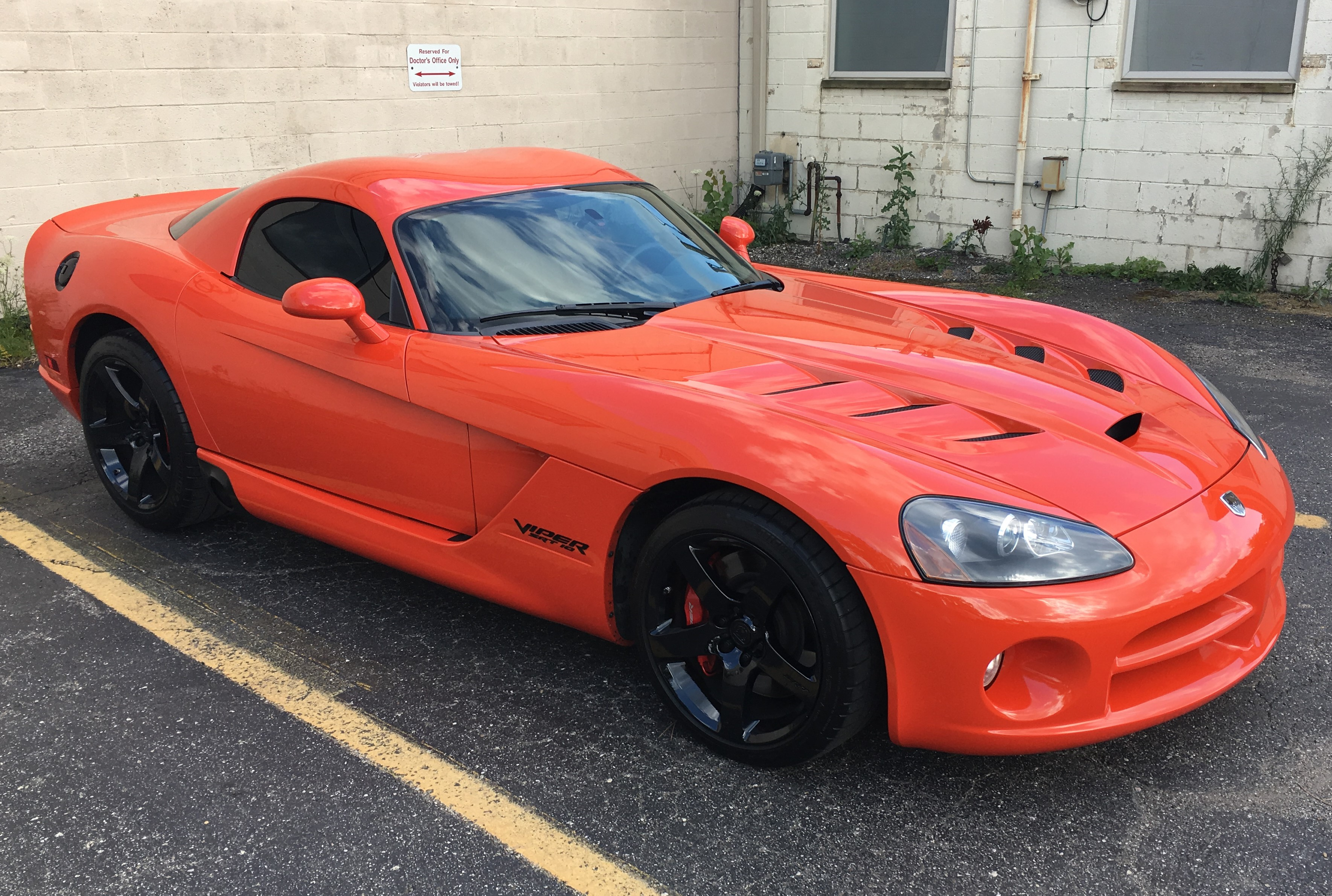
Dodge Viper (ZB II) coupé

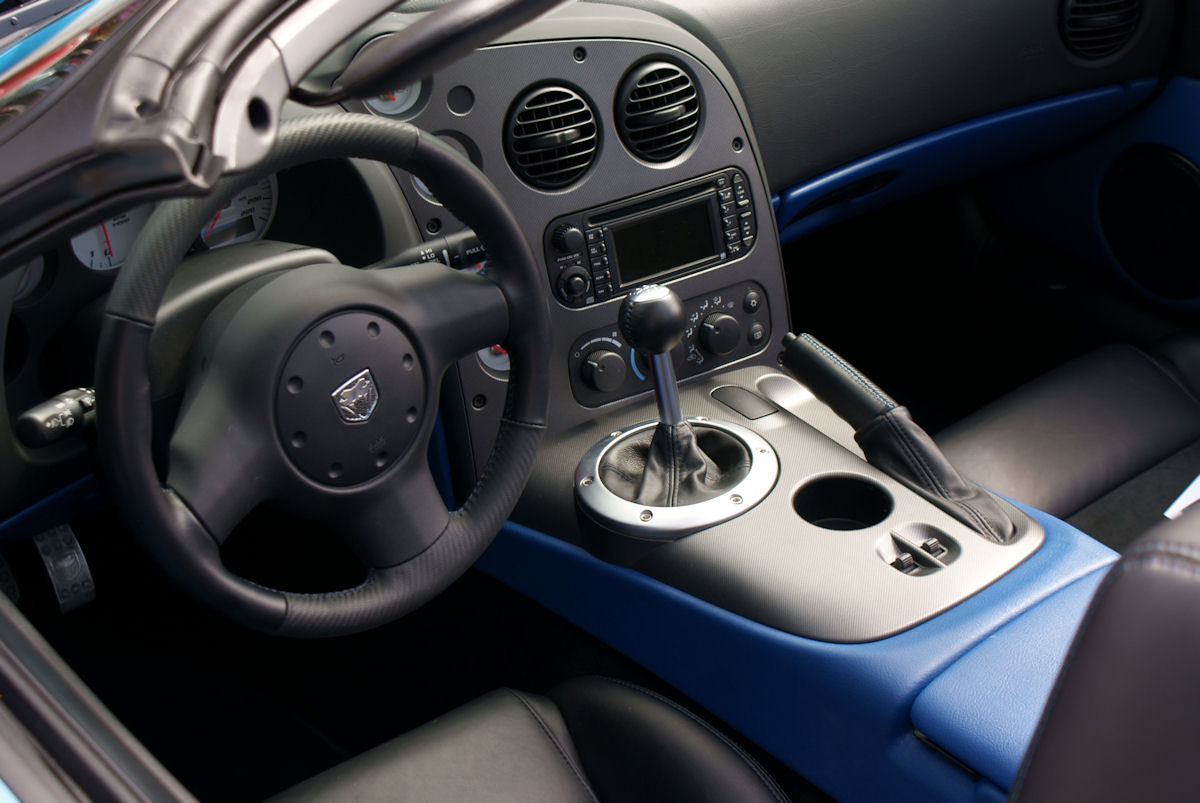
Interior

For the 2008 model year, engine capacity was raised to 8,382 cc (8.4 L; 511.5 cu in) which also resulted in power output being raised to 600 hp (608 PS; 447 kW) at 6,100 rpm and 560 lb⋅ft (759 N⋅m) of torque at 5,000 rpm. The engine was developed in collaboration with McLaren Automotive and Ricardo Consulting Engineers and included better flowing heads with larger valves, Mechadyne cam-in-cam variable valve timing on the exhaust cam lobes, and dual electronic throttle bodies. Other modifications included a new camshaft profile and valve-springs, resulting in improved valvetrain stability allowing the rev limit to be raised by 300 rpm. Additionally, an Electronic engine control developed by Continental AG was implemented; the controller can monitor the crankshaft and cylinder position up to six times during each firing and has 10 times more processing power than the previous unit.

No notable exterior changes were present on the new generation of the Viper except a vented engine cover. The Tremec T56 transmission was replaced with a new Tremec TR-6060 transmission with triple first-gear synchronizers and doubles for higher gears. The rear axle was also replaced and now had a GKN ViscoLok speed-sensing limited-slip differential that helped in attaining maximum grip for the tires. New Michelin Pilot Sport 2 tires increased grip and driver feedback and, along with revised suspension system (springs, anti-roll bars, and shock valving).

Another notable change was the reworked exhaust system; previous third-generation cars had their exhaust crossover under the seats which resulted in a large amount of heat going into the cockpit, which was done initially to help improve the car's exhaust note, since the first two generations of the Viper, which had no crossover, were criticized for their lackluster exhaust notes.

There were also notable changes to the car's electrical system, including a 180-amp alternator, twin electric cooling fans, electronic throttle bodies, and completely new VENOM engine management system. CAN bus architecture had been combined with pre-existing systems to allow for regulatory compliance. The fuel system was upgraded to include a higher-capacity fuel pump and filtration system.

== Variants ==
=== Viper SRT-10 ACR ===
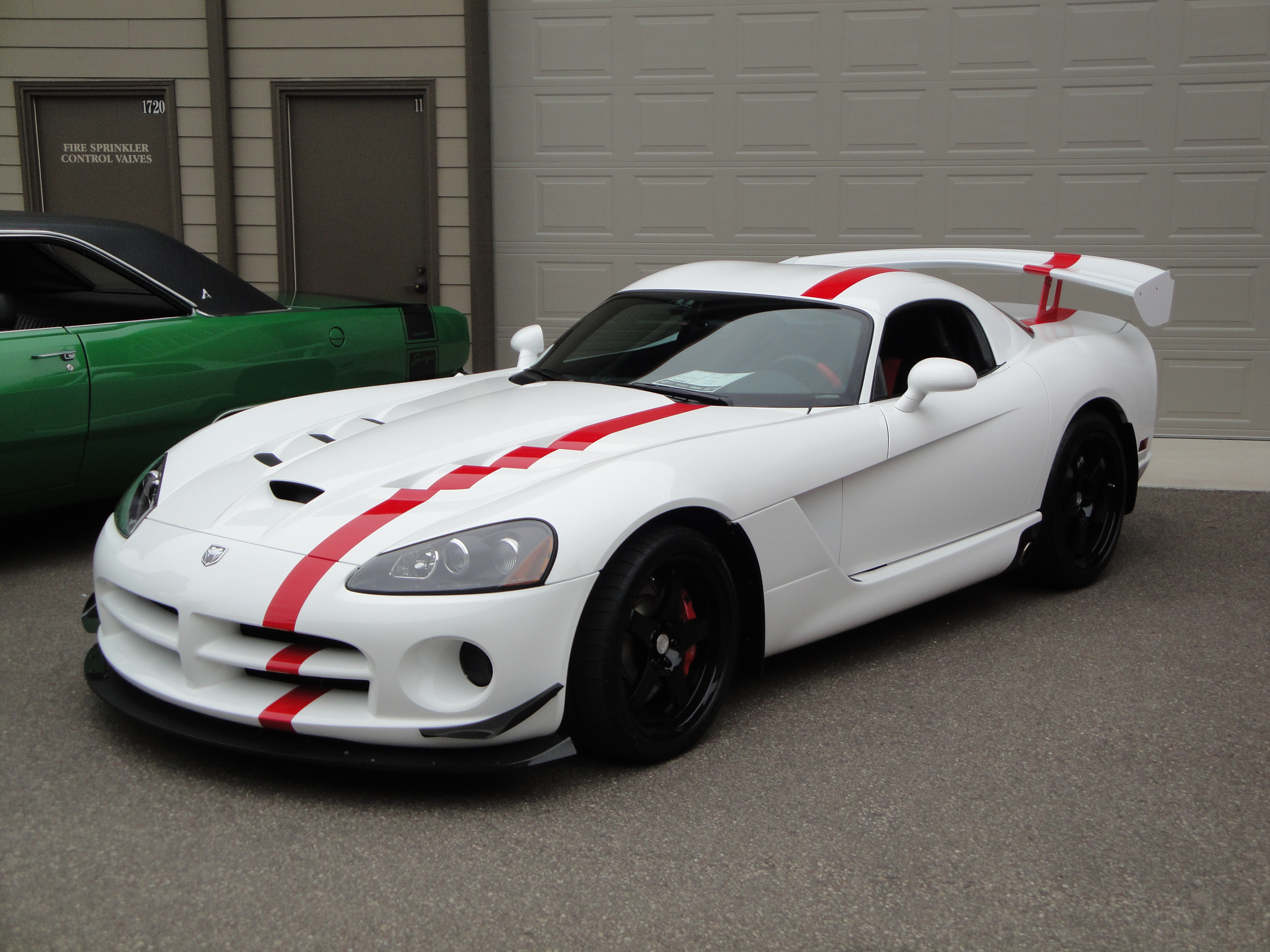
Dodge Viper SRT-10 ACR

The Viper SRT-10 ACR (American Club Racer) is a track-focused, performance-oriented variant of the Viper SRT-10. The intention was to combine Dodge's racing DNA into the road legal Viper to produce a car that was fast, agile and lightweight without compromising its normal driving identity. A carbon fiber front splitter, front canards and an adjustable carbon fiber rear wing made the car more responsive around corners and enabled it to generate 1,000 lb (454 kg) of downforce at 150 mph (241 km/h), distributed approximately 45 percent to the front and 55 percent to the rear. The front splitter included three removable protective wear-resistant rub strips, while the stainless steel tension cables provided enough support to absorb the energy from minor upward deflections. In terms of aerodynamics, the car made use of the high-performance autoclaved carbon-fiber to reduce weight. Lightweight filler panels replace the front fog lamps and gloss black lightweight forged aluminum Sidewinder wheels with Michelin Pilot Sport Cup DOT-approved (street-legal) race tires finish off the exterior of the car. The Viper SRT-10 ACR features a signature two-tone paint scheme with a black center section. There is an optional driver's stripe available which features a sewn leather accent on the steering wheel. A monotone paint scheme is available as an option that features a body-color rear wing and dual painted stripes. Five colors were available especially for the ACR variant namely; Viper Red, Viper Black, Viper Violet, Viper Bright Blue Metallic, and Viper Very Orange. The interior is driver focused with the deletion of the audio system in favor of a lightweight cover on the dashboard that can be used to mount a lap-timer, deletion of the floor mats, underhood silencer pad and the tire inflator in the optional "Hard Core" package in order to save weight. The use of carbon fiber along with the minimalist interior make the car 80 lb (36 kg) lighter than the standard SRT-10 coupe when equipped with the Hard Core package, and 40 lb (18 kg) lighter without. Power remained the same as the SRT-10 but the maximum speed was reduced to 180 mph (290 km/h) for the 2008–2009 models and 184 mph (296 km/h) in 2010 models with the redesigned wing endplates. The SRT10 ACR features a suspension system that includes adjustable coil-over racing dampers from KW Suspensions and two-way adjustable shocks. The dampers and forks are made from solid aluminum billet and are optimized for increased weight reduction and performance. Stopping power comes from StopTech two-piece, slotted lightweight rotors combined with the Viper SRT10's Brembo calipers. This setup reduces rotating inertia and unsprung mass, improves brake cooling, and significantly reduces fade even under extreme conditions. Due to the improved brakes, the car stops from 60 mph (97 km/h) in less than 100 ft (30 m). Braking from 80 mph (129 km/h) is shorter by 11 ft (3 m) than the standard car, steady-state lateral grip has improved by 0.11 g, and improved transient dynamics through the salom bump up the average speed by 3.2 mph (5 km/h).

=== Viper SRT-10 ACR X ===
The Viper SRT-10 ACR X is a more powerful, track only, limited edition variant of the Viper ACR, produced at the end of the fourth generation Viper's production run. The ACR X is powered by the same 8,382 cc (8.4 L; 511.5 cu in) V10 engine which powered all of the fourth generation cars but received a power increase to 640 hp (649 PS; 477 kW) at 6,100 rpm and 605 lb⋅ft (820 N⋅m) of torque at 5,100 rpm. The KW suspension is adjustable and higher spring rates allow the chassis to maximize grip from the special 18-inch-front and 19-inch rear Michelin racing slicks. Various aerodynamic enhancements, such as additional dive planes on the front fascia, provide up to 1,100 pounds of downforce at 150 mph (241 km/h), or about 100 more than on the regular ACR. The X's curb weight is claimed to be reduced by 120 lb (54 kg) compared with the standard ACR's weight. The new total—about 3,200 lb (1,451 kg)—was mostly realized by thoroughly stripping out the interior. The dash board and the center console are retained from the ACR and an eight-point, SCCA-certified roll cage and fuel cell were fitted, a single racing seat and harness, deletion of side windows, and a removable Momo steering wheel complete the interior. Other racing add-ons include a fire-suppression system, transmission and differential coolers, and larger front brake rotors fed by ducting that is more efficient than the street car's. The X's improved power-to-weight ratio improves acceleration by 1/10th of a second as compared to the ACR's 3.4-second 0-to-60 mph (97 km/h) time and enables the car to complete the 1/4 mile (402 m) in 11.8-seconds at 126 mph (203 km/h). The modifications made to the car help it achieve 1.08 g of skidpad grip, but courtesy to the extreme drag generated by all the downforce-generating aero components, the top speed is reduced to 185 mph (298 km/h).

== Production ==
On November 4, 2009, Dodge Brand President and CEO Ralph Gilles announced that the Viper would cease production in the summer of 2010.

Keeping the end of production onto consideration, Dodge announced several special edition Vipers for the 2010 model year:

Voodoo edition: The Voodoo edition (31 units were made) was a special take on the ACR edition which included special black paint and red striping. The Voodoo edition also had a unique interior and steering wheel as well.

1:33 Edition: The 1:33 edition was another take on the ACR edition which celebrates the then unofficial lap record at Mazda Raceway Laguna Seca. The 1:33 edition had black paint and red two-tone paint. The 1:33 cars have piano black trim inside and red accent stitching on the seats.

Final Edition: On February 10, 2010, Dodge began accepting orders for the Viper SRT10 "Final Edition" models. Only 50 cars were produced (20 coupes, 18 roadsters and 12 ACRs). "Final Edition" cars carried the special build code, "AXZ", and were to be the very last of the Viper cars.

July 1, 2010 brought about the end of production for the fourth generation of the Dodge Viper. During an event hosted by Dodge and the Viper Club of America, the final iteration of the Viper, which was given a gold finish with contrasting orange stripes, was presented in front of those attending the ceremony. Its completion commemorated the end of production of the ZB II Viper.

== Performance ==
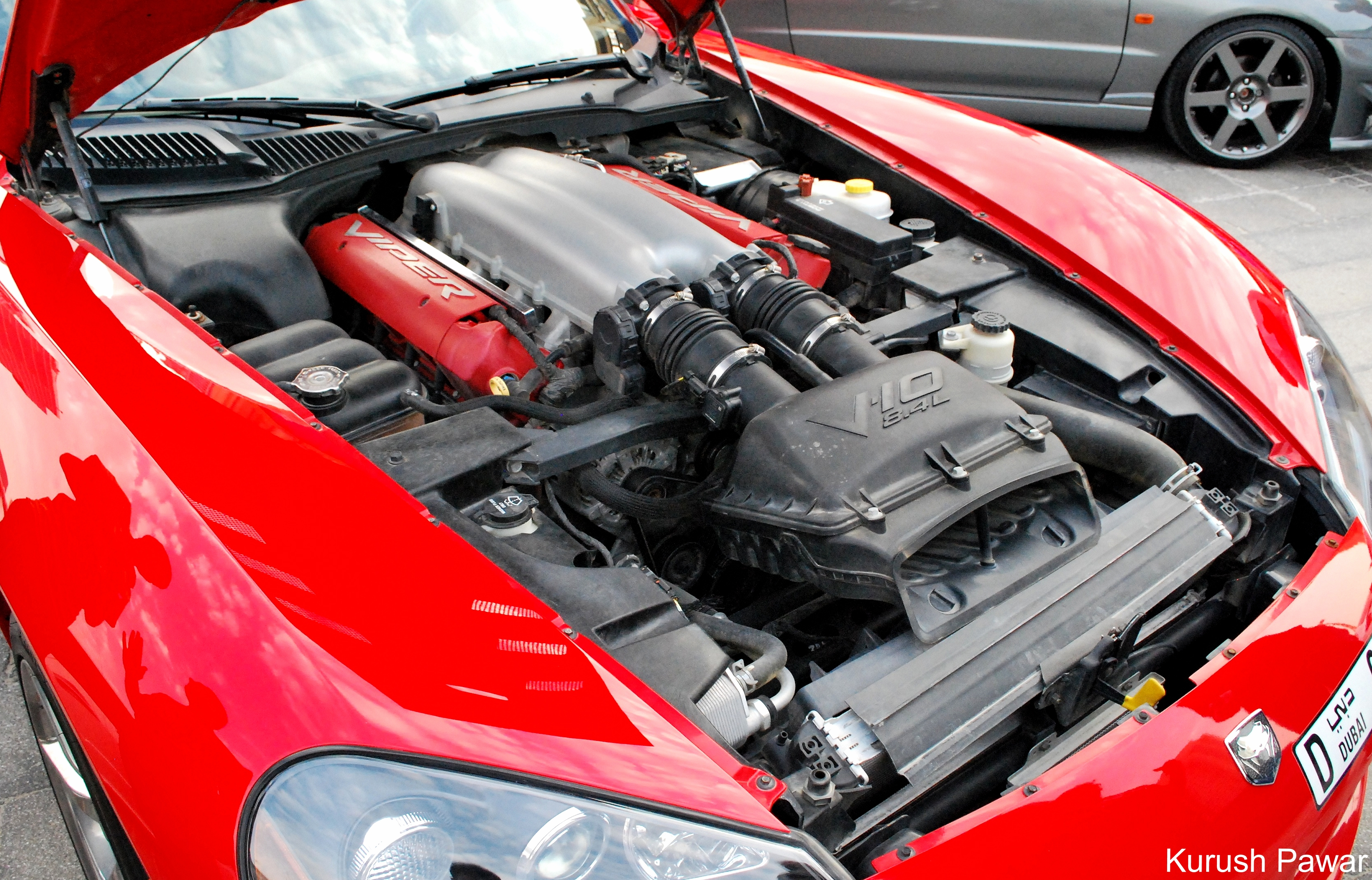
The 8.4 L Viper V10 Engine with dual throttle bodies/intake manifolds

- 0–60 mph (0–97 km/h): 3.79 sec
- 0–100 mph (0–161 km/h): 7.6 sec
- quickest 1/4 mile (402 m): 10.92 sec @ 129.79 mph (209 km/h)
- top speed: 202 mph (325 km/h) (Coupe & Roadster top-up), 197 mph (317 km/h) Roadster top-down
- slalom: 74.2 mph (119 km/h)+
- skidpad average acceleration: 1.05 g (10.4 m/s²)
- 100–0 mph (161–0 km/h): 270 ft (82 m)

Car and Driver magazine tested the car, and found a 0–60 mph (0–97 km/h) time of 3.6 seconds, a 0–100 mph (0–161 km/h) time of 7.6 seconds, and a 1/4 mile (402 m) time of 11.5 seconds at 126 mph (203 km/h). Dodge's claims for top speed are 197 mph (317 km/h) for the Roadster with the top down and 202 mph (325 km/h) for the Coupe and Roadster with the top up. Car and Driver also tested the Viper's track performance, and managed a fast sub-3 minute lap time around Virginia International Raceway. The Viper's time, despite hot weather, was faster than the Corvette Z06, Ford GT, Nissan GT-R, Porsche 911 Turbo, 911 GT3, and 911 GT2, Audi R8, and similar cars. According to Car and Driver and Motor Trend, the car's slightly adjusted suspension setup and new differential gave it cornering ability as sharp as before with better control, feedback, and response.

== Lap records ==
The SRT-10 ACR was put through its paces at the Nürburgring and clocked in a record time of 7:22.1. Kuno Wittmer piloted a street legal 2010 Dodge Viper ACR to a record lap of 1:59.995 at Miller Motorsports Park in Tooele, Utah, on Monday, April 11, breaking the 2-minute mark for the first time in a production car on the 3.048-mile Outer Course configuration.

The Dodge Viper ACR and ACR-X have retained a Nürburgring Nordschleife lap time of 7:12.13 and 7:03.06 respectively, beating cars worth tenfold the price.

Track	Lap Time	Driver	Model
Mazda Raceway Laguna Seca	1:30.46	Chris Winkler	ACR
El Toro	0:39.89	Gary Thomason	ACR
Gingerman Raceway	1:26.70	Dominik Farnbacher	ACR
Nürburgring Nordschleife	7:12.13	Dominik Farnbacher	ACR
Willow Springs International Motorsports Park	1:26.00	Dominik Farnbacher	ACR
Willow Springs - Streets Of Willow	1:08.56	Steve Millen	ACR
Auto Club Speedway	0:53.43	unknown	ACR
Buttonwillow Raceway Park	1:55.70	unknown	ACR
Grattan Raceway	1:22.70	unknown	ACR
Miller Motorsports Park	1:59.99	unknown	ACR
Nelson Ledges Road Course	1:08.90	unknown	ACR
Spring Mountain Motorsports Ranch	1:45.40	unknown	ACR
Virginia International Raceway	2:48.60	unknown	ACR
