= Bristol Fighter (automobile) =

Overview
- Manufacturer: Bristol Cars
- Production: 2004–2011
- Assembly: United Kingdom: Filton
- Designer: Max Boxstrom

Body and chassis
- Class: Sports car (S)
- Body style: 2-door coupé
- Layout: Front mid-engine, rear-wheel-drive
- Platform: unique
- Doors: Gullwing doors
- Related: Dodge Viper; Devon GTX; Chrysler Firepower; Alfa Romeo Zagato TZ3

Powertrain
- Engine: 8.0 L Viper EWB V10
- Transmission: 6-speed manual; 4-speed automatic

Dimensions
- Wheelbase: 108.3 in (2,750 mm)
- Length: 4,420 mm (174.0 in)
- Width: 1,795 mm (70.7 in)
- Height: 1,345 mm (53.0 in)
- Kerb weight: 1,540 kg (3,395 lb) (525 bhp version)

The Bristol Fighter is a sports car produced by Bristol Cars in small numbers from 2004 until the company suspended manufacturing in 2011. It is generally classed as a supercar.

The coupé body, which features gullwing doors, was designed by former Brabham Formula One engineer Max Boxstrom and gives the car a Cd of 0.28.

== Design ==
The car uses a front-mid-mounted 7,996 cc (487.9 cu in) V10 engine, a modified version of the engine in the Dodge Viper and the Dodge Ram SRT-10 pick up (it was originally based on the Chrysler LA engine), but modified by Bristol to produce 525 bhp (391 kW; 532 PS) at 5,600 rpm and 525 lb⋅ft (712 N⋅m) of torque at 4,200 rpm. This is in keeping with Bristol's use of Chrysler engines since 1961. In the more powerful Fighter S, the engine is tuned to produce 628 bhp (468 kW; 637 PS) (660 hp at high speed, using the ram air effect). The car's weight is 1,600 kg (3,527 lb).

The car has a six-speed manual or four-speed automatic transmission, and is rear-wheel drive. It can accelerate from 0–60 mph (97 km/h) in 4.0 seconds (claimed), and has a power-to-weight ratio of 267.8 kW/t (359.1 bhp/t). The car has a claimed top speed of 210 mph (338 km/h) and the driver can be 6 ft 7 in (2.0 m) tall at maximum.

Although sketches and models had been publicized some time before, a complete car was first shown to the press in May 2003. The first drive by a car magazine appears to be that in the April 2005 issue of Evo magazine.

It is not known exactly how many Bristol Fighters were manufactured, but research indicates that 20 chassis were produced. Of these 18 series 1 chassis have been accounted for and one series 2 chassis exists. At the time of Bristol Cars collapse, three series 1 chassis were in various states of completion and two series 1 chassis and the sole series 2 chassis were untouched. One of these cars went on to be completed and delivered in 2015. This would indicate, although not confirmed, that 14 cars were completed (including the pre-production car). The series 2 chassis is believed to have been intended for the Fighter T model. The remaining five existing chassis are slated to be completed in a continuation series announced in September 2026.

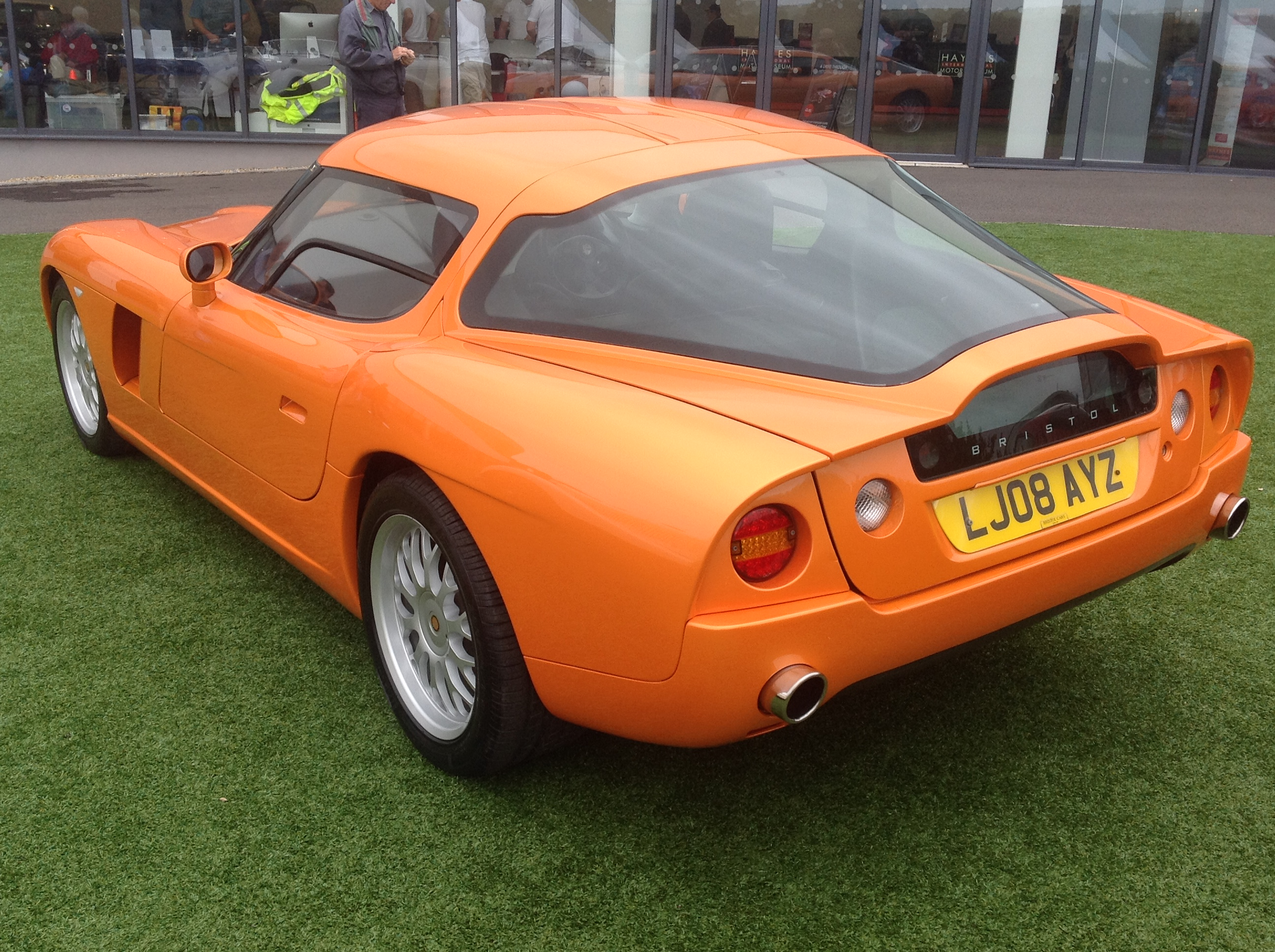
2008 Bristol Fighter (rear view)

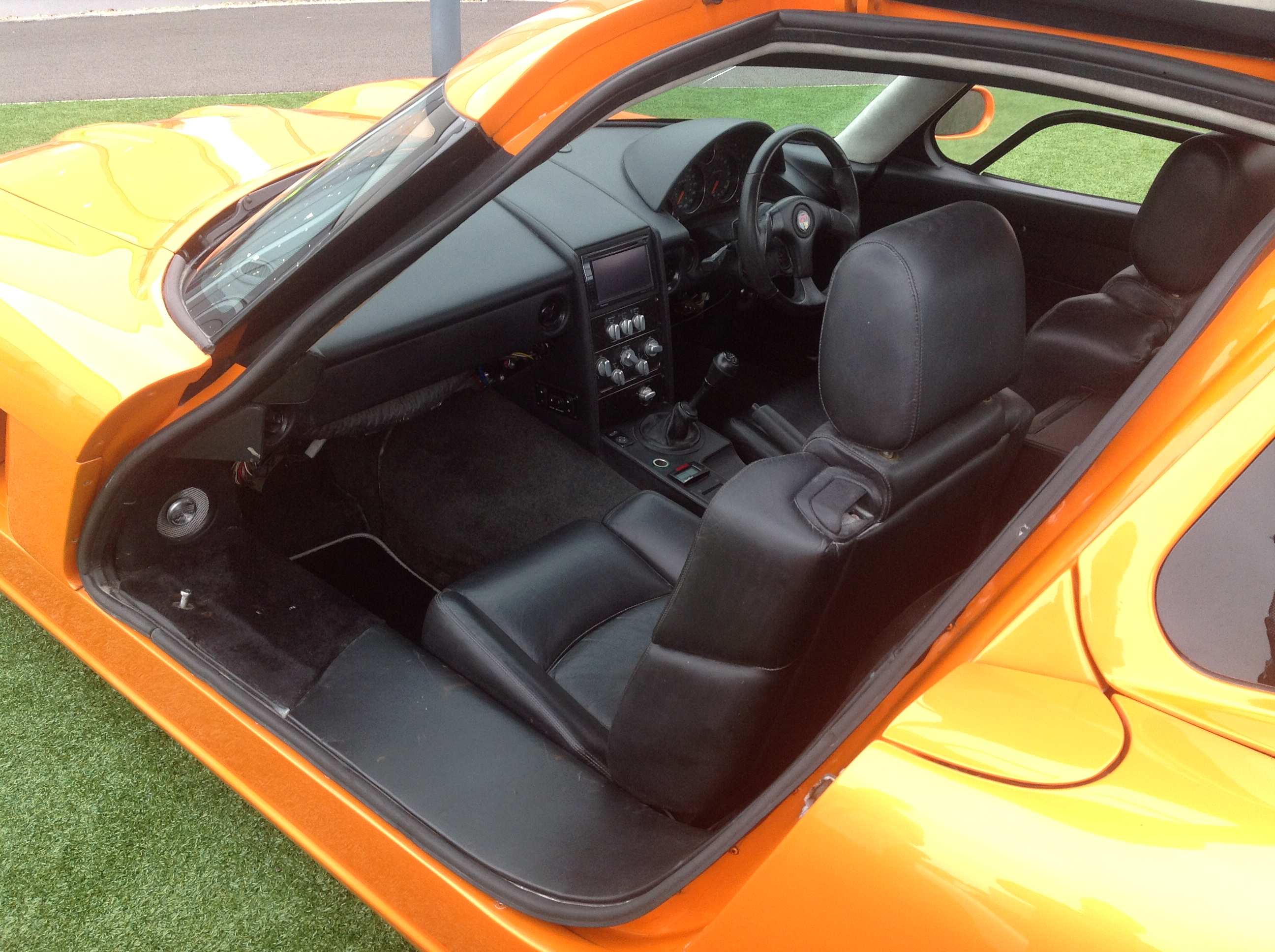
2008 Bristol Fighter (interior)

=== Fighter T ===
In 2006, Bristol announced the Fighter T, a turbocharged version of the Fighter. This was planned to have a modified version of the Chrysler V10 producing 1,050 bhp (783 kW; 1,065 PS) and 1,036 lb⋅ft (1,405 N⋅m) of torque at 4,500 rpm. This also would have made it the first turbocharged, petrol-powered V10 production car. The Fighter T was designed to have an improved drag coefficient of 0.27. Bristol claimed that the car would be capable of more than 270 mph (430 km/h); however it would have been electronically limited to a "more than adequate" 225 mph (362 km/h). In the end, no Bristol Fighter T's were ever produced.

== Specifications ==
Model	Engine	Displacement	Max power	Max torque	Acceleration 0–60 mph (0–97 km/h) (s)	Top speed
Fighter	V10	7,994 cc (487.8 cu in)	525 bhp (391 kW; 532 PS) at 5,500 rpm	525 lb⋅ft (712 N⋅m) at 4,200 rpm	4.0	210 mph (338 km/h)
Fighter S	V10	7,994 cc (487.8 cu in)	628 bhp (468 kW; 637 PS) at 5,900 rpm	580 lb⋅ft (786 N⋅m) at 3,900 rpm	4.0	210 mph (338 km/h)
Fighter T	V10 turbo	7,994 cc (487.8 cu in)	1,012 bhp (755 kW; 1,026 PS) at 5,600 rpm	1,036 lb⋅ft (1,405 N⋅m) at 4,500 rpm	3.5	225 mph (362 km/h) limited
