= Viper engine =

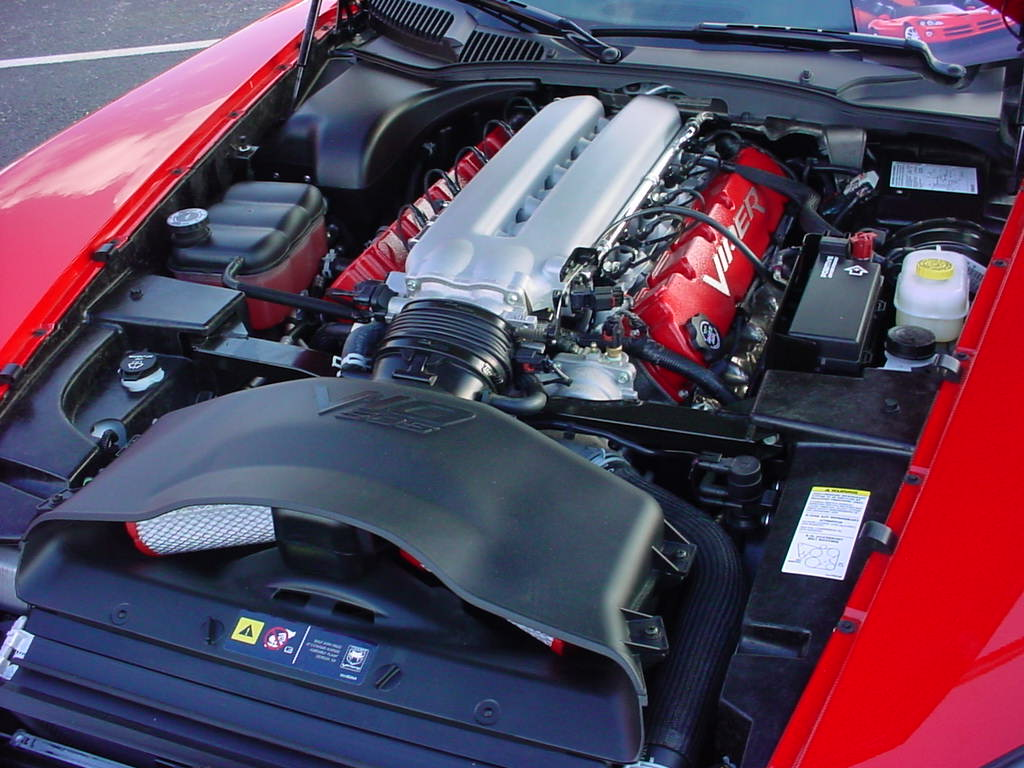
- The Viper engine in the ZB I version of the Viper

Overview
- Manufacturer: (United States) Chrysler
- Production: 1992–2010; 2012–2017

Layout
- Configuration: Naturally-aspirated; 90° V10
- Displacement: 488 cu in (7,990 cc); 506 cu in (8,285 cc); 512 cu in (8,382 cc)
- Cylinder bore: 4.00 in (101.6 mm); 4.03 in (102.4 mm); 4.055 in (103.0 mm)
- Piston stroke: 3.88 in (98.6 mm); 3.96 in (100.6 mm)
- Cylinder block material: Aluminum
- Cylinder head material: Aluminium
- Valvetrain: OHV 2 valves per cylinder with VVT (2008+ models)
- Compression ratio: 9.6:1, 10.2:1

Combustion
- Fuel system: Multi-port fuel injection
- Fuel type: Gasoline
- Oil system: Wet sump
- Cooling system: Water cooled

Output
- Power output: 400 hp (406 PS; 298 kW); 415 hp (421 PS; 309 kW); 450 hp (456 PS; 336 kW); 460 hp (466 PS; 343 kW); 500 hp (507 PS; 373 kW); 510 hp (517 PS; 380 kW); 600 hp (608 PS; 447 kW); 640 hp (649 PS; 477 kW); 645 hp (654 PS; 481 kW)
- Torque output: 465 lb⋅ft (630 N⋅m); 490 lb⋅ft (664 N⋅m); 500 lb⋅ft (678 N⋅m); 525 lb⋅ft (712 N⋅m); 535 lb⋅ft (725 N⋅m); 560 lb⋅ft (759 N⋅m); 600 lb⋅ft (813 N⋅m)

Dimensions
- Dry weight: 625 lb (283 kg); 650 lb (290 kg)

The Viper engine is a high-performance naturally-aspirated pushrod 2 valve-per-cylinder 90° V10 engine designed by Chrysler but with aluminum block castings designed by Lamborghini for use in the Dodge Viper. Despite its large displacement, it is based on the Chrysler LA V8.

== Development ==
=== Phase SR (1992–2002) ===
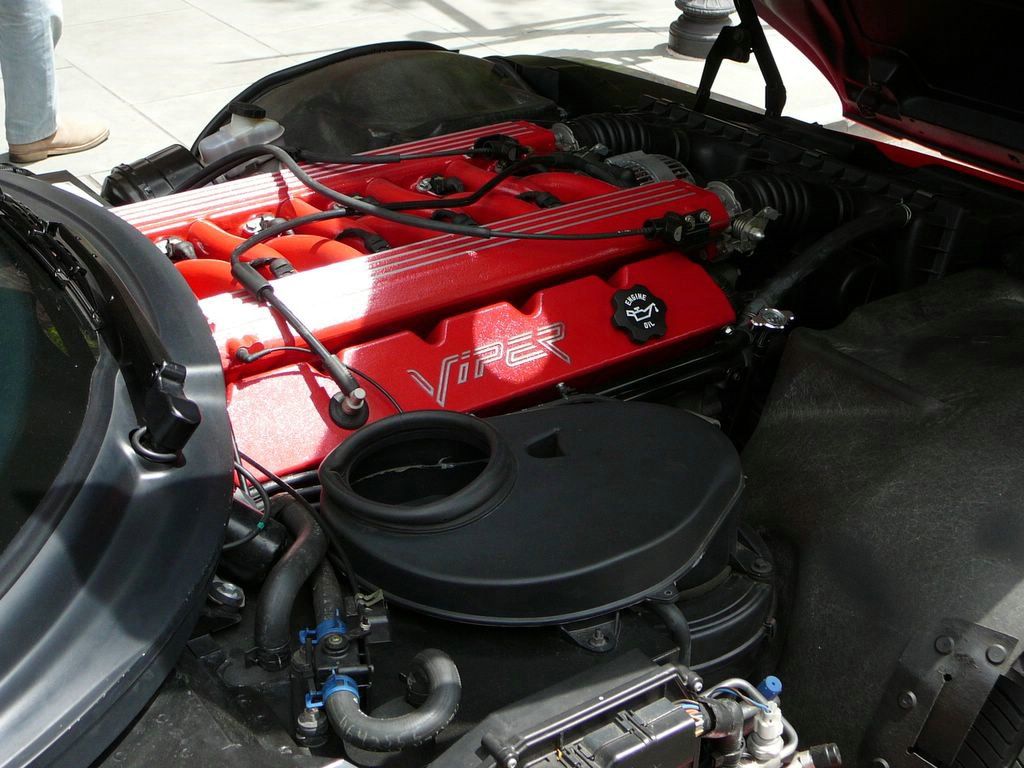
The Viper engine in the SR I version of the Viper

==== SR I (1st generation) ====
The Viper V10 was developed as a dedicated, all-aluminum sports car powerplant that debuted with the Dodge Viper in 1992. While the first test mule (VM-01) used a modified 5.9 L iron V8, and the 1989 Viper concept (VM-02) was fitted with a prototype iron V10 engine, assembled by brazing together pieces from two 5.9 L V8s, the production engine shared basic 4.46-inch bore center spacing with the Chrysler LA engine family to utilize existing factory machining lines. Chief powertrain engineer Dick Winkles confirmed that the production V10 was engineered independently and shared virtually no parts with the cast-iron 5.9-liter Magnum V8 or the later Magnum V10 truck engine. Chrysler enlisted its Italian subsidiary, Lamborghini, to assist with casting the large aluminum block and cylinder heads.

The first-generation Viper V10 engine had a displacement of 7,990 cc (8.0 L; 487.6 cu in) and produced 400 hp (406 PS; 298 kW) at 4600 rpm and 450 lb⋅ft (610 N⋅m) of torque at 3600 rpm. It features a sequential multipoint fuel injection system with bottom-fed injectors, dual throttle bodies, and dual plenums. It also features an external coolant manifold running alongside the block, inspired by Formula 1. In addition to the cast aluminum block and heads, it also features magnesium valve covers.

==== SR II (2nd generation) ====
The second-generation engine, also displacing 8.0 L, produced 450 hp (456 PS; 336 kW) at 5200 rpm and 490 lb⋅ft (664 N⋅m) of torque at 3700 rpm. 1999 was the last year for forged pistons until the 5th gen engine was released in 2012. There was an emissions transition happening around this time that may have influenced this.

=== Phase ZB (2003–2010) ===
==== ZB I (3rd generation) ====
The third-generation engine, introduced on the 2003 Viper, had a displacement of 8,285 cc (8.3 L; 505.6 cu in) with a bore x stroke of 102.4 mm × 100.6 mm (4.03 in × 3.96 in), rated at 510 hp (517 PS; 380 kW) at 5600 rpm and 535 lb⋅ft (725 N⋅m) at 4200 rpm of torque after SAE certification in 2006.

==== ZB II (4th generation) ====
For the 2008 Dodge Viper, the engine's output was increased to 600 bhp (608 PS; 447 kW) at 6100 rpm and 560 lb⋅ft (759 N⋅m) at 5000 rpm of torque via a slight displacement increase to 8,382 cc (8.4 L; 511.5 cu in) and the use of variable valve timing, among the first utilized in a pushrod engine. The bore was now 4.055 in (103.0 mm), the same as Chrysler's 6.1 L Hemi engine.

=== Phase VX (2012–2017) ===
==== VX I (5th generation) ====
The 2013 SRT Viper kept roughly the same displacement but further boosted power to 640 hp (649 PS; 477 kW) at 6150 rpm and 600 lb⋅ft (813 N⋅m) at 4950 rpm of torque. Since 2015, power was raised up to 645 hp (654 PS; 481 kW) at 6200 rpm.

== Other applications ==
In addition, the Viper V10 was installed in the Dodge Ram SRT-10, and Dodge Tomahawk concept vehicle. Bitter Cars of Germany produced the Bitter GT1, based on the Lotus Elise GT1, using this engine.

The V10 was also sold to British luxury car manufacturer Bristol Cars: the Bristol Fighter was powered by a modified version of the engine which produced 525 bhp (532 PS; 391 kW), increasing to 550 bhp (558 PS; 410 kW) at high speed due to the ram air effect. Bristol Cars further produced a Fighter S, in which the engine was tuned to give 628 bhp (637 PS; 468 kW) (660 bhp (669 PS; 492 kW) at high speed). Bristol had also planned to produce a Fighter T, further modifying the engine with a turbocharger to produce 1,012 bhp (1,026 PS; 755 kW) at 5600 rpm. However, Bristol have since stated that no Fighter T models were produced.

- Bristol Fighter
- Dodge Tomahawk
- Millyard Viper V10 Motorcycle
- Spania GTA Spano
- VLF Force 1
- Dodge Ram SRT-10
- Alfa Romeo Zagato TZ3 Stradale
- HTT Pléthore LC 1300
