= Alfa Romeo Giulia TZ =

Italian sports car

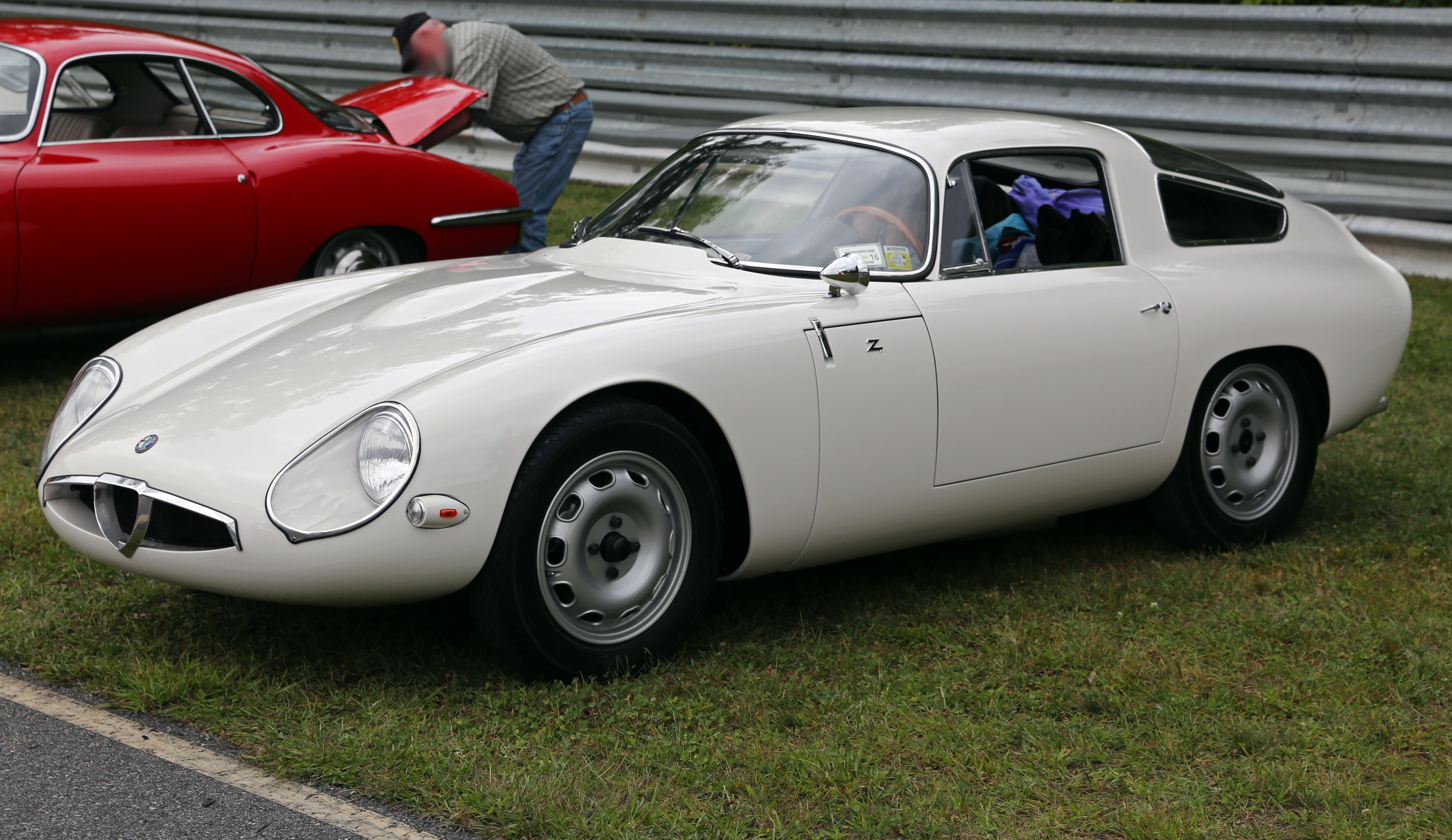
- 1963 Alfa Romeo Giulia TZ

Overview
- Manufacturer: Alfa Romeo
- Also called: Alfa Romeo TZ
- Production: 1963–1967; 112 produced
- Assembly: Italy: Udine (Delta of Udine:1963); Settimo Milanese (Autodelta: 1964–1967)
- Designer: Ercole Spada at Zagato (TZ1 and TZ2) Aldo Brovarone for Pininfarina

Body and chassis
- Class: Sports car (S); Racing car
- Body style: 2-door coupé
- Layout: Front mid-engine, rear-wheel-drive
- Related: Alfa Romeo Canguro; Alfa Romeo Giulia 1600 Sport

Powertrain
- Engine: 1.6 L DOHC I4
- Transmission: 5-speed manual

Dimensions
- Wheelbase: 2,200 mm (86.6 in)
- Length: 3,950 mm (155.5 in) TZ; 3,680 mm (144.9 in) TZ2
- Width: 1,509 mm (59.4 in) TZ; 1,600 mm (63.0 in) TZ2
- Height: 1,199 mm (47.2 in) TZ; 1,020 mm (40.2 in) TZ2
- Curb weight: 660 kg (1,460 lb) (TZ); 620 kg (1,370 lb) (TZ2)

Chronology
- Predecessor: Alfa Romeo Giulietta SZ
- Successor: Alfa Romeo Giulia GTA (Giulia TZ road trim); Alfa Romeo Tipo 33 (Giulia TZ race trim)

The Alfa Romeo Giulia TZ (also known as the Alfa Romeo TZ or Tubolare Zagato) is a sports car and racing car manufactured by Alfa Romeo from 1963 to 1967. It replaced the Giulietta SZ. In 2011, the name was reduced from Giulia TZ to TZ in the new TZ3 model.

== Giulia TZ ==
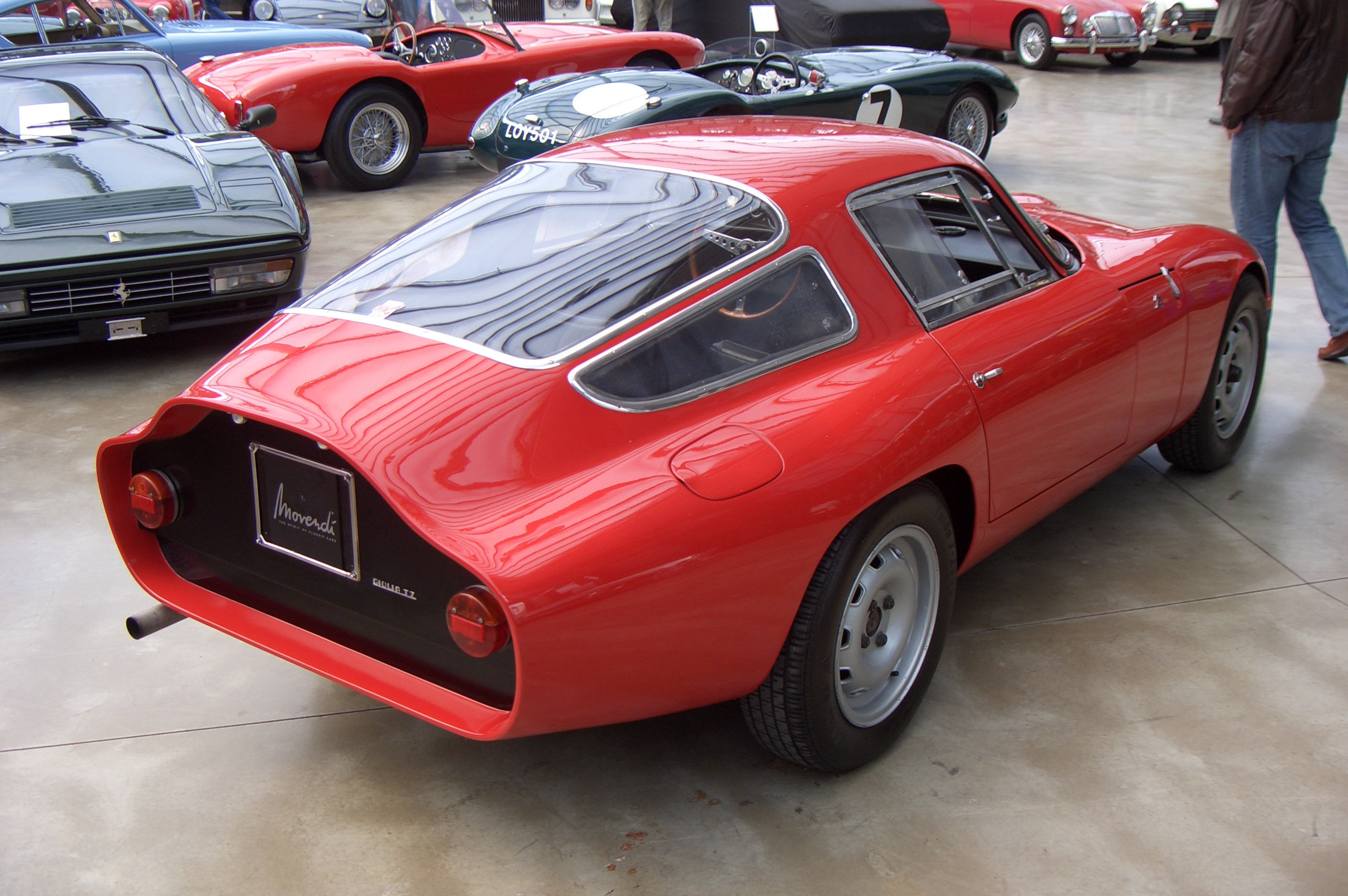
Rear view of the Alfa Romeo Giulia TZ

The original TZ, currently sometimes referenced as TZ1 to differ from later TZ2 was presented at the 1962 Turin Auto Show.

It featured a 1,570 cc twin cam engine and other mechanical components shared with the Alfa Romeo Giulia and carried a 105 series chassis number, but was a purpose built sports racing car, with a tubular spaceframe chassis built in the province of Perugia by SAI Ambrosini and the light all-aluminium bodywork was made by Zagato, final assembly was made Delta of Udine, with Carlo Chiti initially on board as a consultant before becoming the project leader. The firm soon changed its name to Auto-Delta and relocated to its current site in Settimo Milanese, on the outskirts of Milan, not far from the Alfa Romeo Portello Plant.

It has disc brakes and independent suspension. The result was a lightweight coupé of only 650 kg (1,433 lb) and top speed of 216 km/h (134 mph). The TZ was built both for street and racing trim, with the latest racing versions producing up to 160 PS (118 kW). Alfa's twin-spark cylinder head, as also used in their GTA, contributed to the speed of the TZ; the standard Giulia alloy block with wet steel liners was installed at an angle under the hood of the TZ to improve airflow.

Aiding the TZ in its quest for performance was the treatment of the rear bodywork. Incorporating the research of Dr. Wunibald Kamm, the TZ used a style called coda tronca in Italian, meaning "short tail.", otherwise known as the Kamm tail. The principle is that unless an aircraft-like extended tail is incorporated, which is not practical for an automobile, there is little, if any, increase in drag and a marked decrease in lift or even some downforce by simply chopping off a portion of the tail. Zagato had previously proved the success of this tail treatment in their coda tronca Sprint Zagato sports-racing cars, and it was a natural evolution to adapt this to the Giulia TZ.

The car debuted at the 1963 FISA Monza Cup, where TZs took the first four places in the prototype category. At the beginning of 1964 the TZ was homologated (100 units were needed for homologation) to the Gran Turismo category. After homologation it started to take more class wins in Europe and North-America. Of the first TZ, 112 units were built between 1963 and 1965. Only built as limited amount these TZ models are highly collectable today, with listed prices around 150,000-200,000 US dollars.

=== Engine ===
- 1,570 cc straight-4 DOHC (78 mm x 82 mm) 112 PS (82 kW) at 6500 rpm (road trim), 160 PS (118 kW) (race trim)

== Giulia TZ2 ==
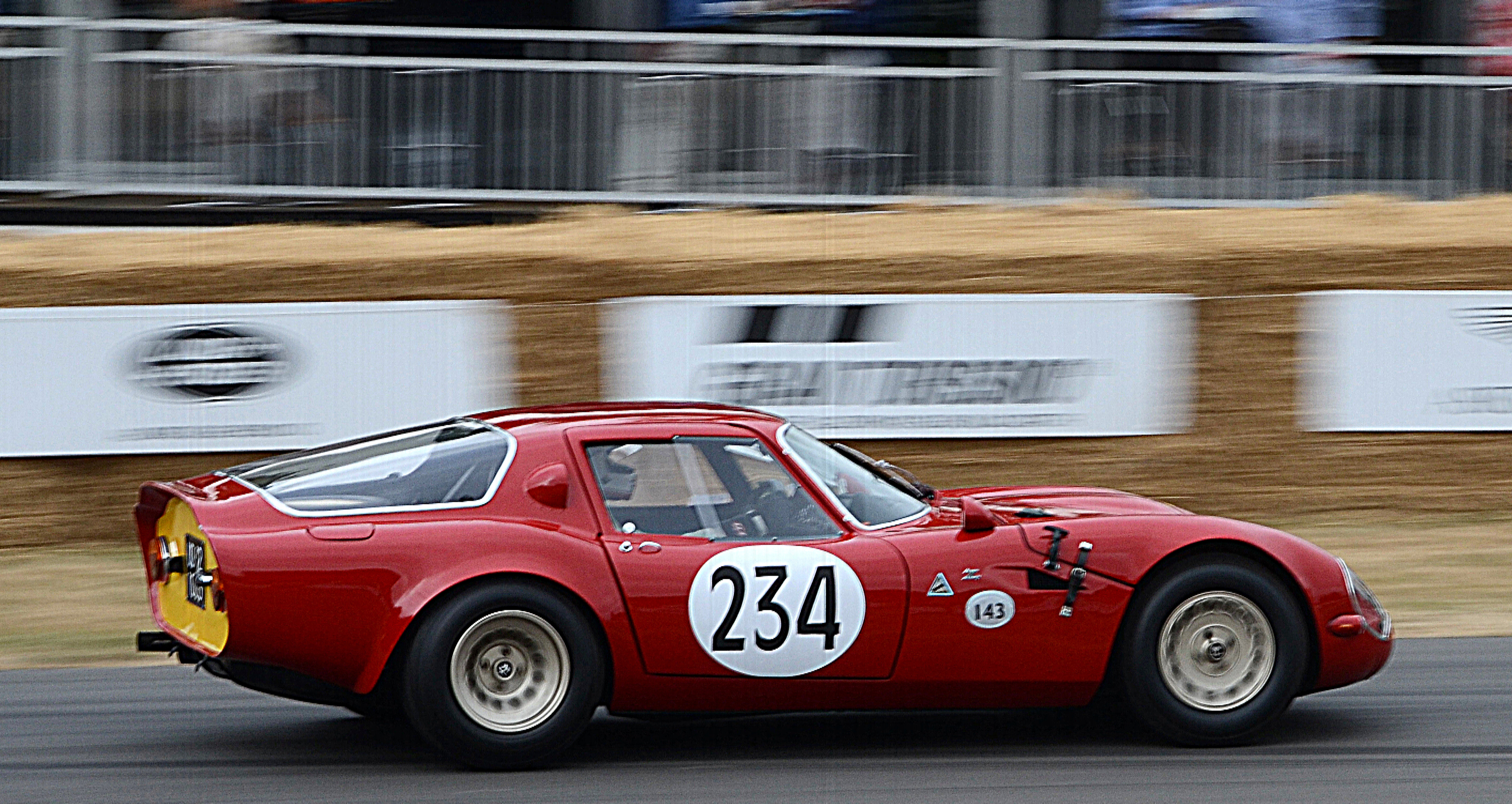
TZ2 at the 2018 Goodwood Festival of Speed.

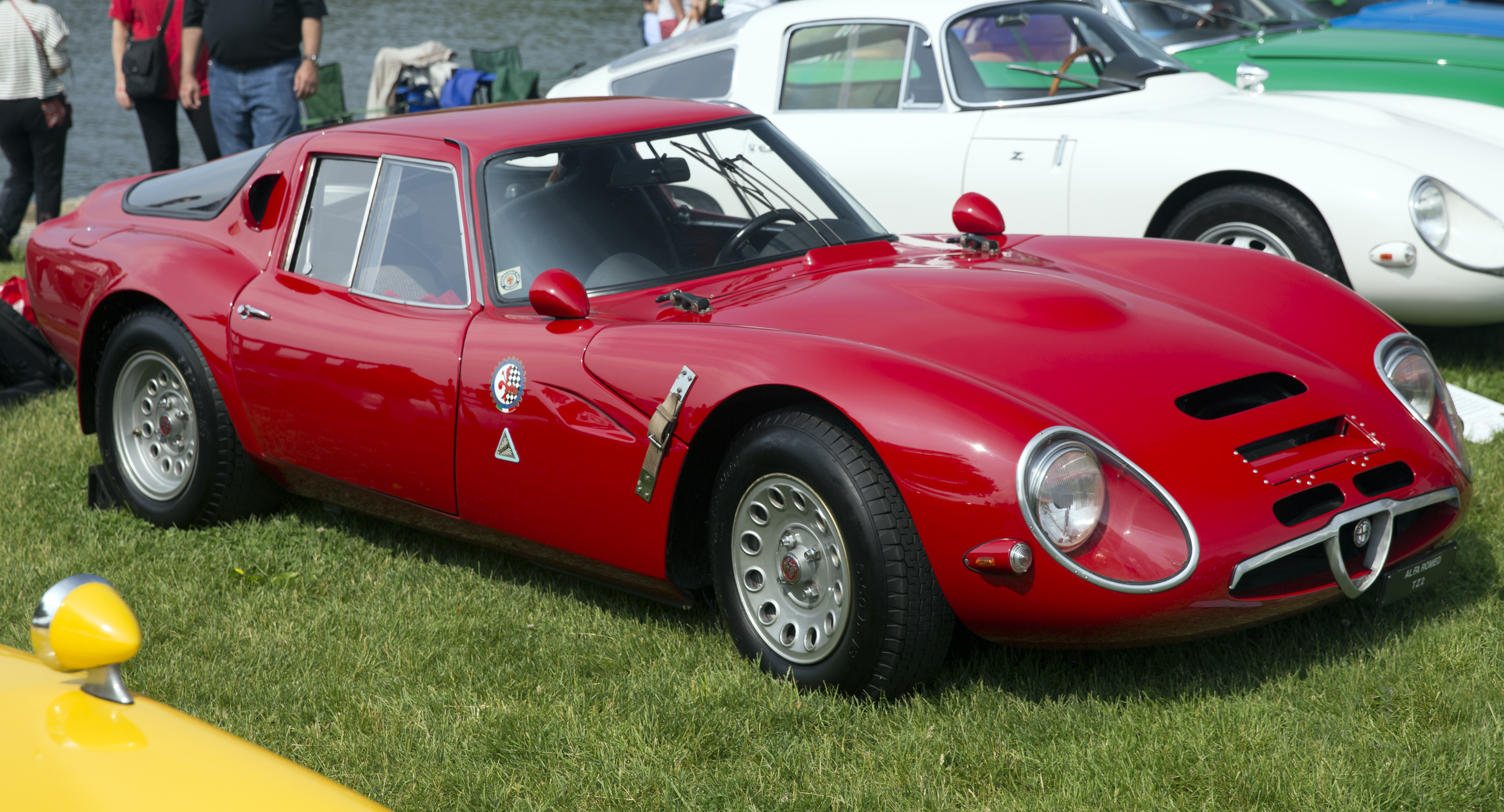
Front of the TZ2

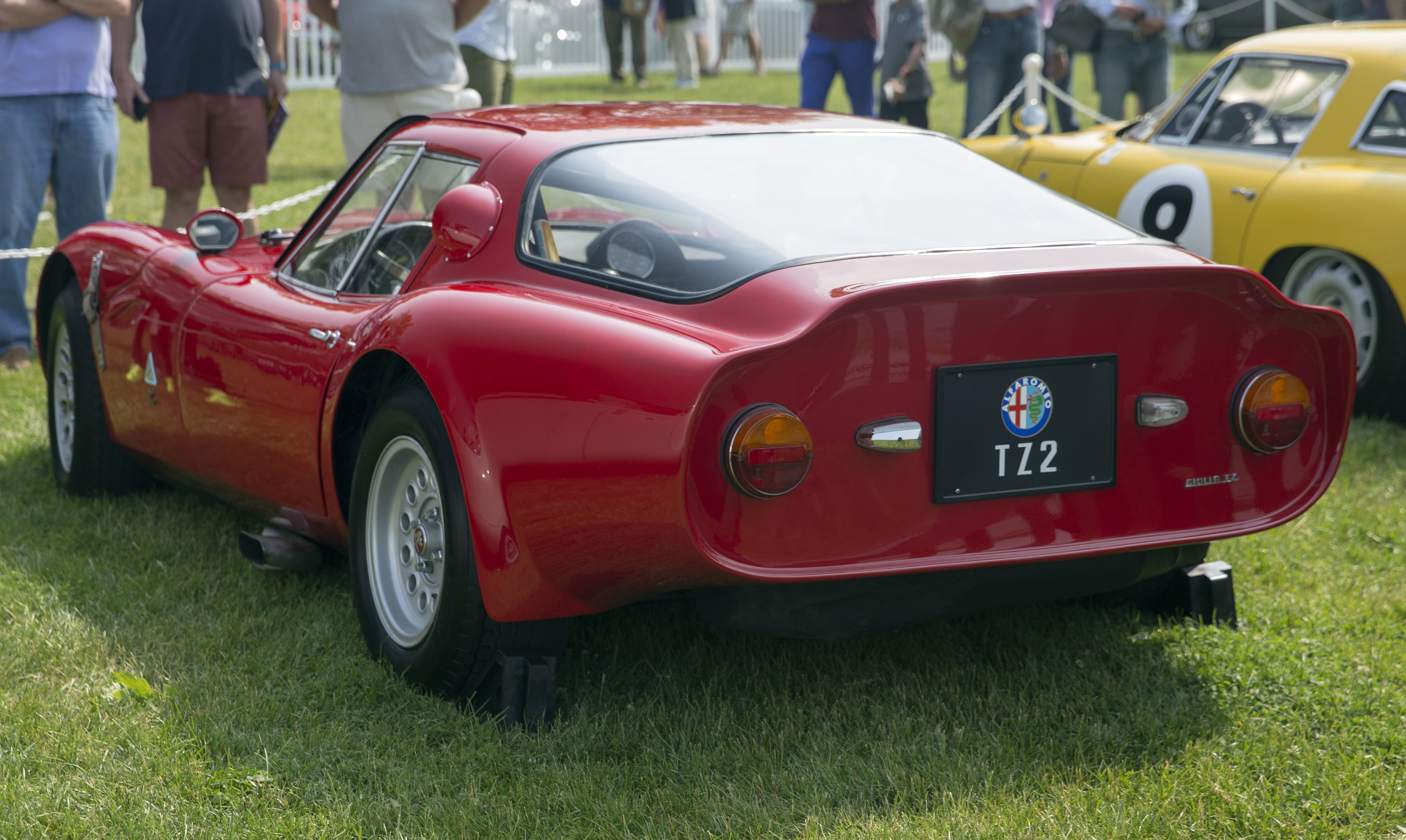
Rear view of TZ2

A new version of TZ was introduced at the Turin Auto Show in 1964 in the Zagato stand. In order to reinforce the structure and further reduce the car's weight, Zagato replaced the light alloy body with an even more streamlined fibreglass body moulded tight to the chassis providing lower drag and reduced weight of 620 kg (1,370 lb). The new design was called the Alfa Romeo Giulia TZ2. The TZ2 was only built as racing version; it was equipped with an Autodelta-prepared twin plug, dry sump lubrication 1,570 cc (1.6 L; 95.8 cu in) DOHC straight-4 engine producing around 170 bhp (127 kW) at 7000 rpm. With this engine the car reached top speed of 245 km/h (152 mph). The rear window was also changed, now single unit rather than three part window in TZ. Development of TZ cars was stopped in the end of 1965, to make room for the new Alfa Romeo GTA racing program. Only 12 TZ2s were built.

The car won the prestigious Gran Turismo Trophy at the 2009 Pebble Beach Concours d'Elegance.

=== Race results ===
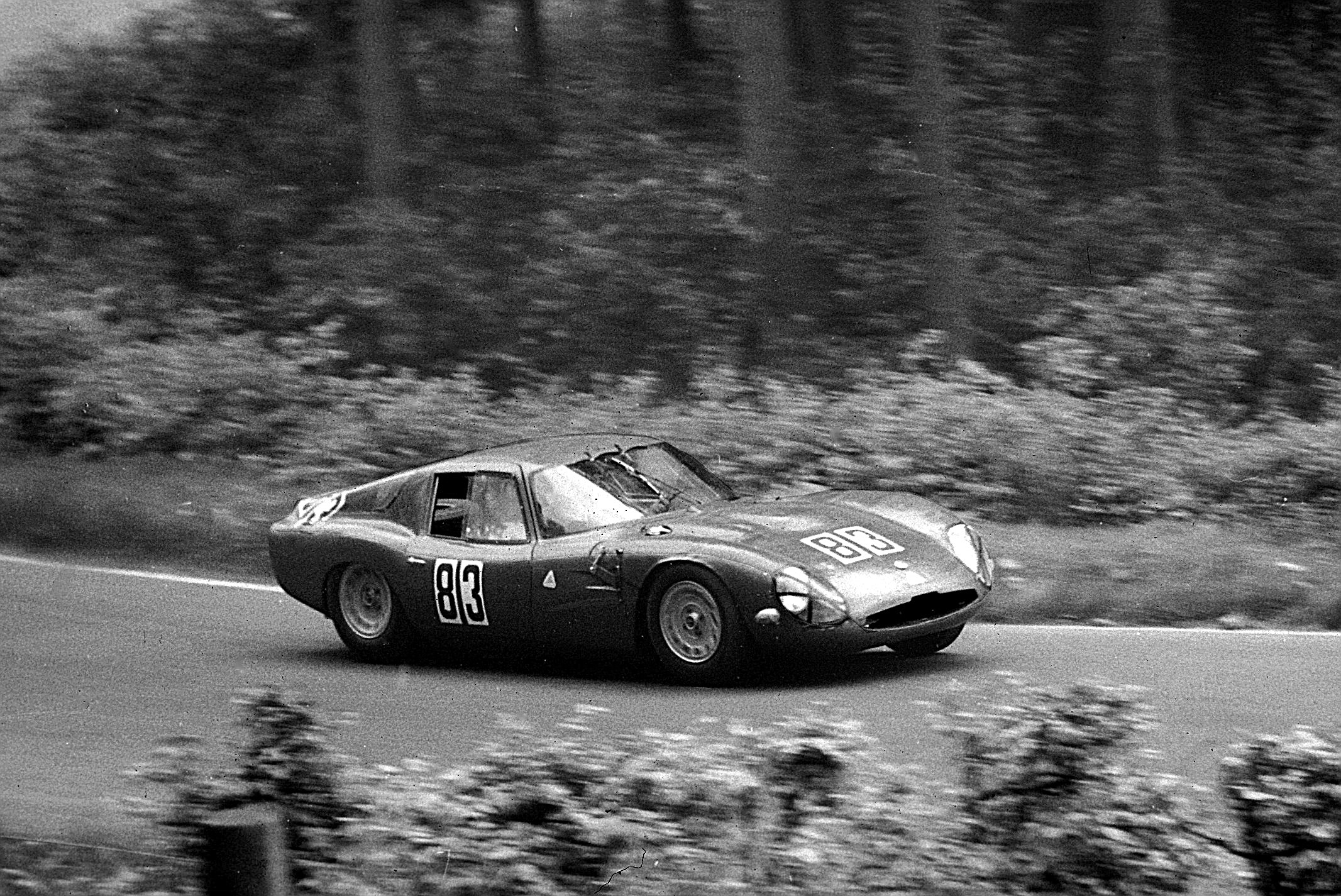
Alfa Romeo TZ2, Andrea de Adamich and Giacomo Russo in Hatzenbach section 1000km Nürburgring 1965; 17th overall, winner of the GT class up to 1.6 liters, 40 laps in 7: 00: 53.400 hours

The TZ2 took class win on 25 April 1965 in the 1000 km of Monza, with Bussinello-De Adamich finishing seventh overall and first in the GT 1600 category. Also in 1965 it took class victories thanks to Rolland-Consten in the 12 Hours of Sebring; Bianchi-Rolland in the Targa Florio; and Adamich-"Geki" in the 1000 km of Nürburgring, the 6 Hours of Melbourne, the Giro d'Italia and the Criterium des Cevennes. There were further class wins the following year: at Monza (De Adamich-Zeccoli), Sebring (Andrey-"Geki"), in the Targa Florio (Pinto-Todaro) and at the Nürburgring (Bianchi-Schultze).

Prominent Australian racing team of the 1960s, Sydney based Mildren Racing run by former race driver and Australia's official Alfa Romeo importer of the time Alec Mildren, also raced the Giulia TZ2 in sports car racing. Painted in the teams traditional bright yellow, the car was driven to victory and placings in sports car races in Australia by the teams driver Kevin Bartlett.

Bartlett and Doug Chivas drove the Mildren Racing TZ2 to third place in the 1966 Rothmans 12 Hour International Sports Car Race held at the Surfers Paradise International Raceway in Queensland, Australia. Bartlett and Chivas covered 471 laps, 23 behind the winning Ferrari 250LM of Jackie Stewart and local racer Andy Buchanan.

== TZ3 ==
Alfa Romeo Zagato TZ3
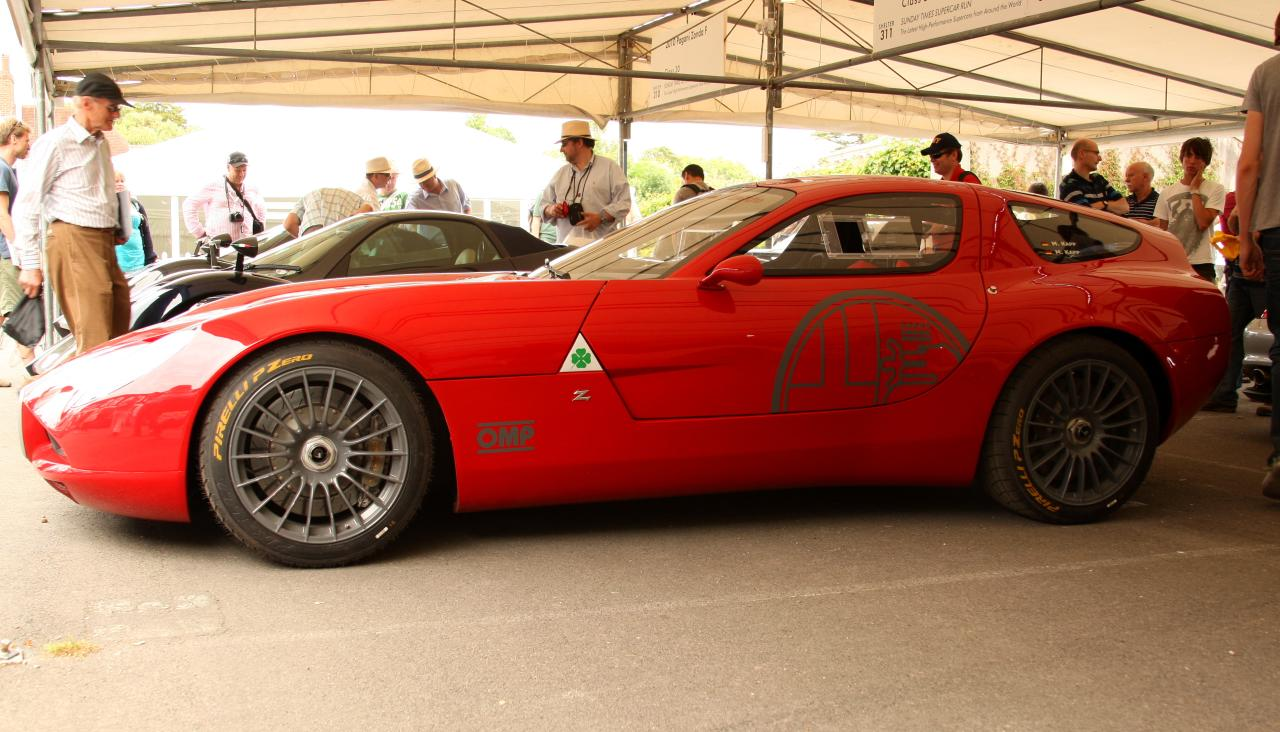
- The 2011 Alfa Romeo TZ3 Corsa

Overview
- Manufacturer: Fiat Group Automobiles
- Also called: Alfa Romeo TZ3
- Production: 2011 (1 Corsa, 9 Stradales)
- Designer: Norihiko Harada of Zagato

Body and chassis
- Class: Sports car (S)
- Body style: 2-door coupe
- Layout: Front longitudinal mid-engine, rear-wheel drive
- Platform: Gillet Vertigo.5 (Corsa); Dodge Viper (Stradale)
- Related: Gillet Vertigo.5; Dodge Viper

Powertrain
- Engine: 4.2L F136 naturally-aspirated dry-sump lubricated 90-degree DOHC 4-valve V8 - Corsa; 8.4L Viper naturally-aspirated all-aluminum 90-degree OHV 2-valve V10 - Stradale
- Transmission: 6-speed automated manual- Corsa; 6-speed Tremec TR6060 manual - Stradale

Dimensions
- Wheelbase: 2,500 mm (98 in) - Corsa; 2,510 mm (99 in) - Stradale
- Length: 4,345 mm (171.1 in) - Corsa; 4,459 mm (175.6 in) - Stradale
- Width: 1,944 mm (76.5 in) - Corsa; 1,911 mm (75.2 in) - Stradale
- Height: 1,200 mm (47 in) - Corsa; 1,210 mm (48 in) - Stradale
- Curb weight: 850 kg (1,870 lb) - Corsa; 1,450 kg (3,200 lb) - Stradale

A homage to the TZ3 was made in two different iterations in 2010, celebrating Alfa Romeo's centenary.

=== Zagato TZ3 Corsa ===
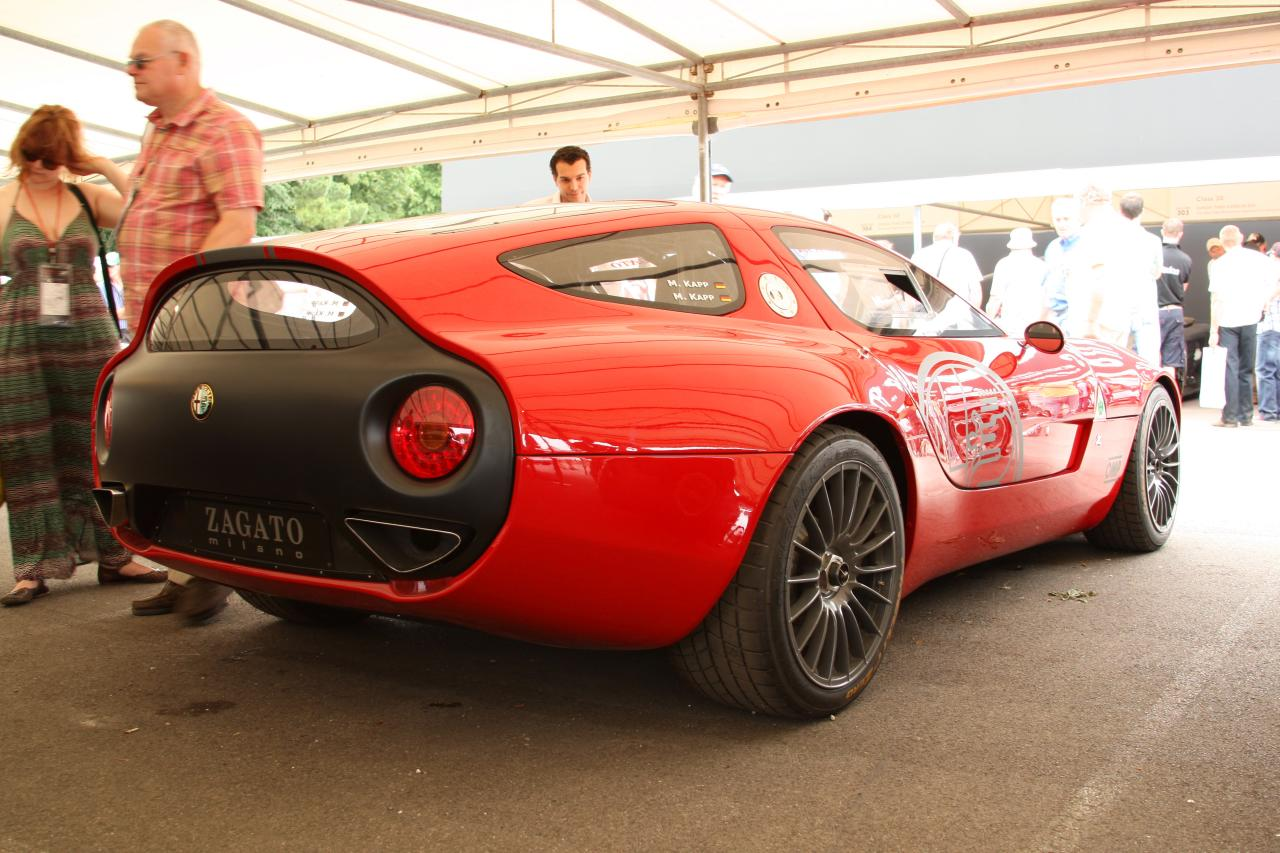
Alfa Romeo TZ3 Corsa rear end

The Alfa Romeo TZ3 Corsa is the track version of the TZ3 (hence the name TZ3 Corsa, Corsa meaning race in Italian) built to celebrate 100 years (a century) of Alfa Romeo in racing. The Corsa is a one-off car that was first presented at, and won, the 2010 Concorso d'Eleganza Villa d'Este in Italy. It was made for German collector Martin Kapp and was based on the Gillet Vertigo.5.

The car weighs 850 kg (1,874 lb) thanks to its carbon fibre frame and hand beaten aluminium body panels and has a 420 hp (313 kW) dry sump 4.2 litre V8 engine. The car has a 6-speed automated manual gearbox and can attain a top speed of over 300 km/h (186 mph). It can accelerate from zero to 100 km/h (62 mph) in 3.5 seconds.

The chassis is a carbon-fiber monocoque with some tubular elements. The suspension setup, front and rear, are double wishbones, with pushrod actuated coil springs, and dampers from Ohlins.

=== Zagato TZ3 Stradale ===
The Alfa Romeo TZ3 Stradale is the road version of the TZ3 (hence the name TZ3 Stradale, stradale meaning "road-going" in Italian), designed by Norihiko Harada of Zagato, and was built to celebrate 100 years of Alfa Romeo on the road. The TZ3's chassis is based on the Dodge Viper ACR-X, and has been re-bodied to suit road conditions. Only nine units of the vehicle have been made.

The TZ3 is powered by the ACR-X's odd-firing 8.4-liter Viper all-aluminum 90-degree OHV 2-valve V10, but its power has been reduced to 600 hp (447 kW; 608 PS) at 6,100 rpm, and 560 lb⋅ft (759 N⋅m) of torque at 5,000 rpm. Redline is reached at 6,250 rpm. This power is delivered to the rear wheels, via a 6-speed Tremec TR6060 manual transmission.

The interior design is mainly the same as a regular Viper, but has Alfa Romeo badging.

The body and the frame come from the ACR-X, which are manufactured with SMC & rim panels over a tubular space frame.

The two-piece brake discs come from StopTech, and the calipers are from Brembo.

The steering is rack-and-pinion, with power assist. The suspension setup for front and rear are A-arms, with coil-over shocks and stabilizer bars.

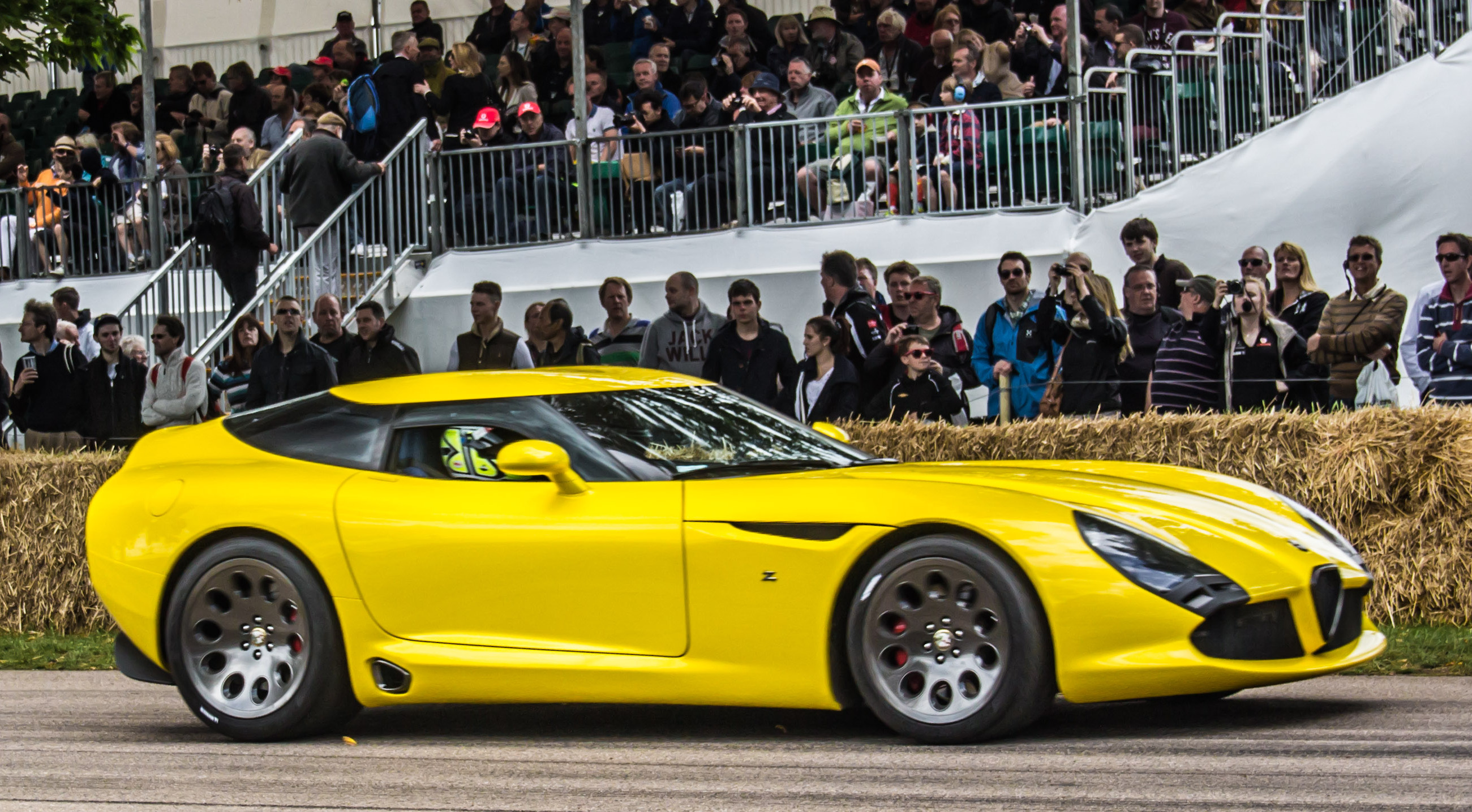
Yellow TZ3 Stradale driven by Jenson Button at the 2012 Goodwood FoS

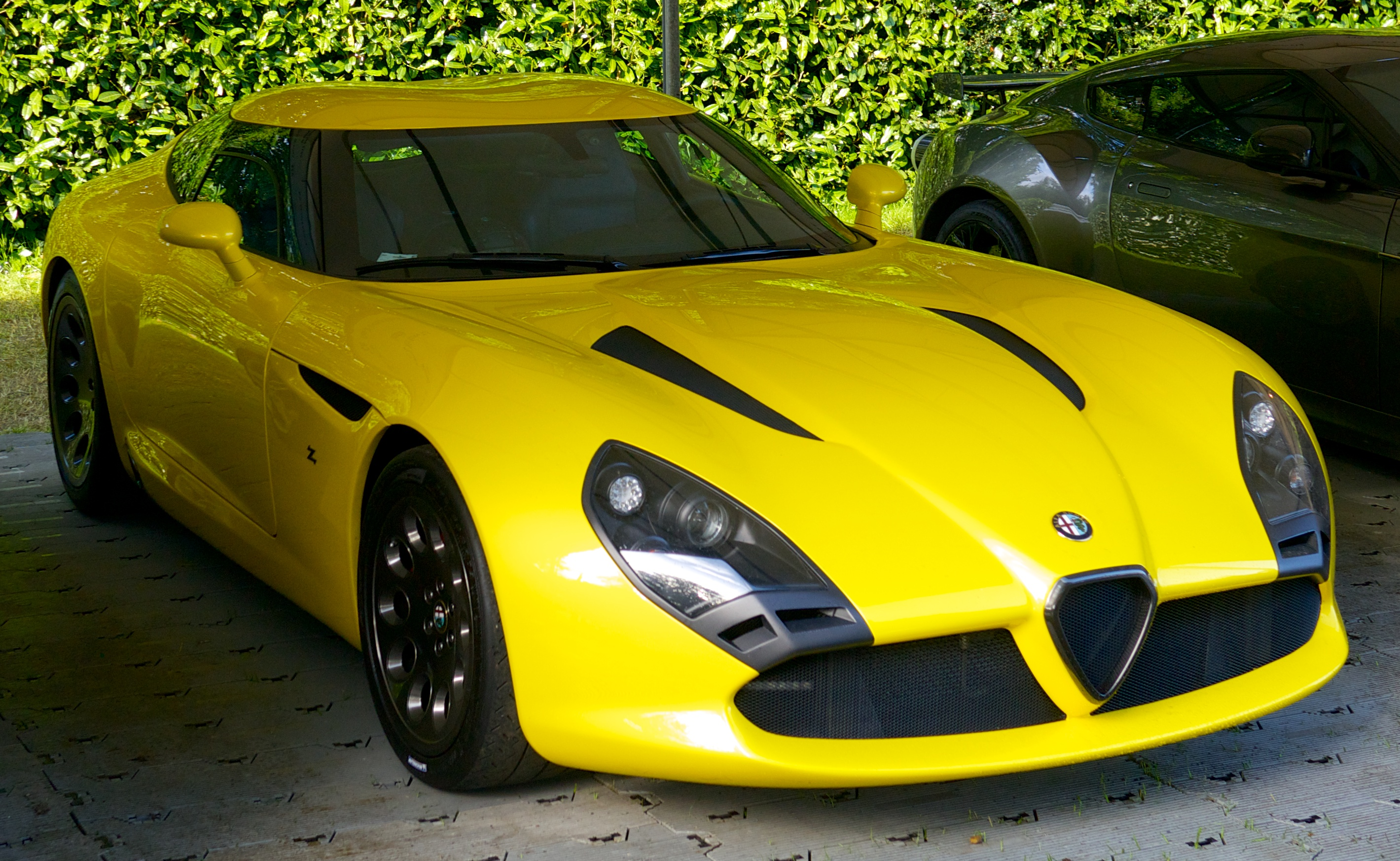

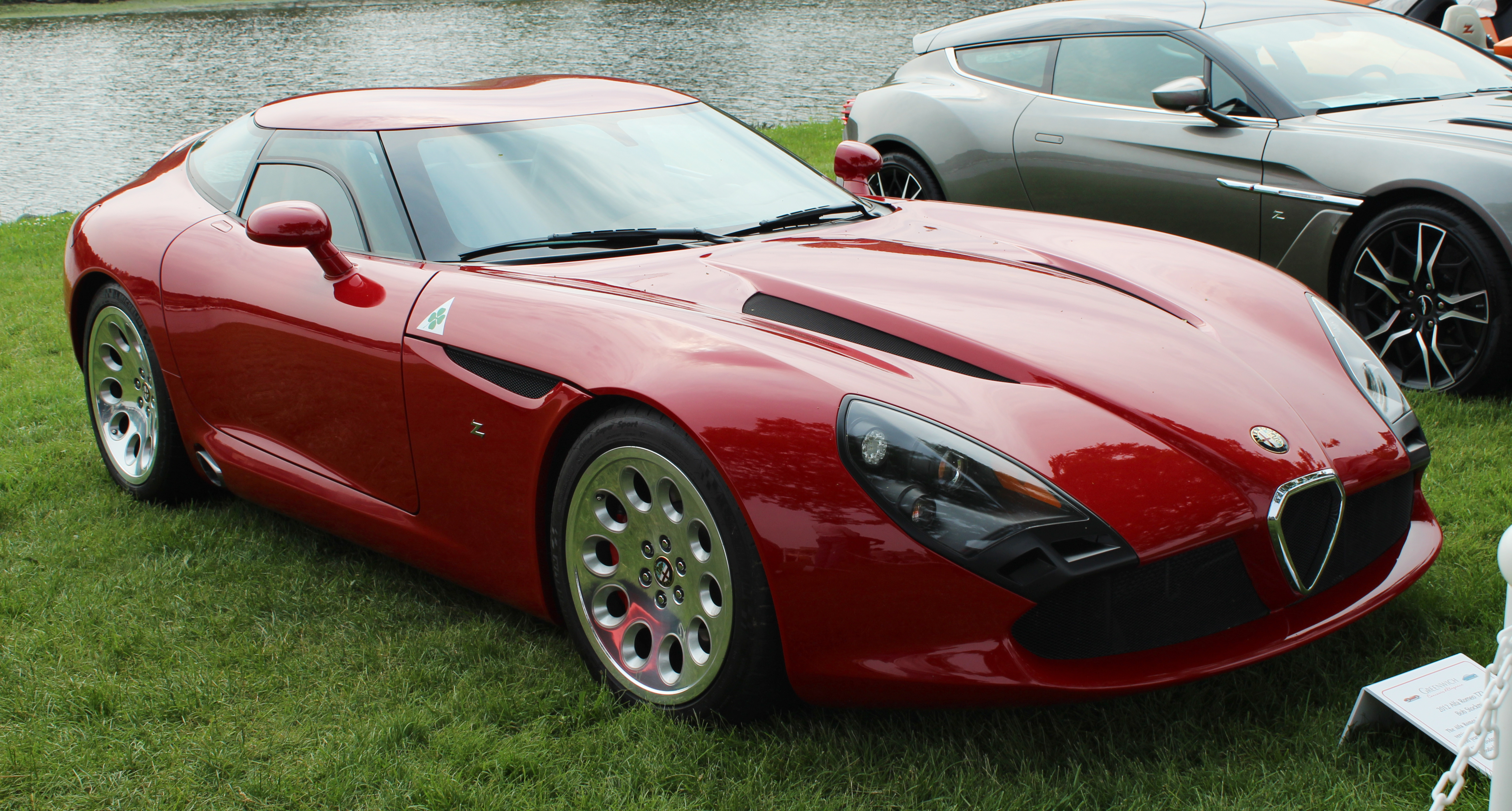
Red TZ3 Stradale on Florida plates shown at the 2019 Greenwich Concours d'élégance

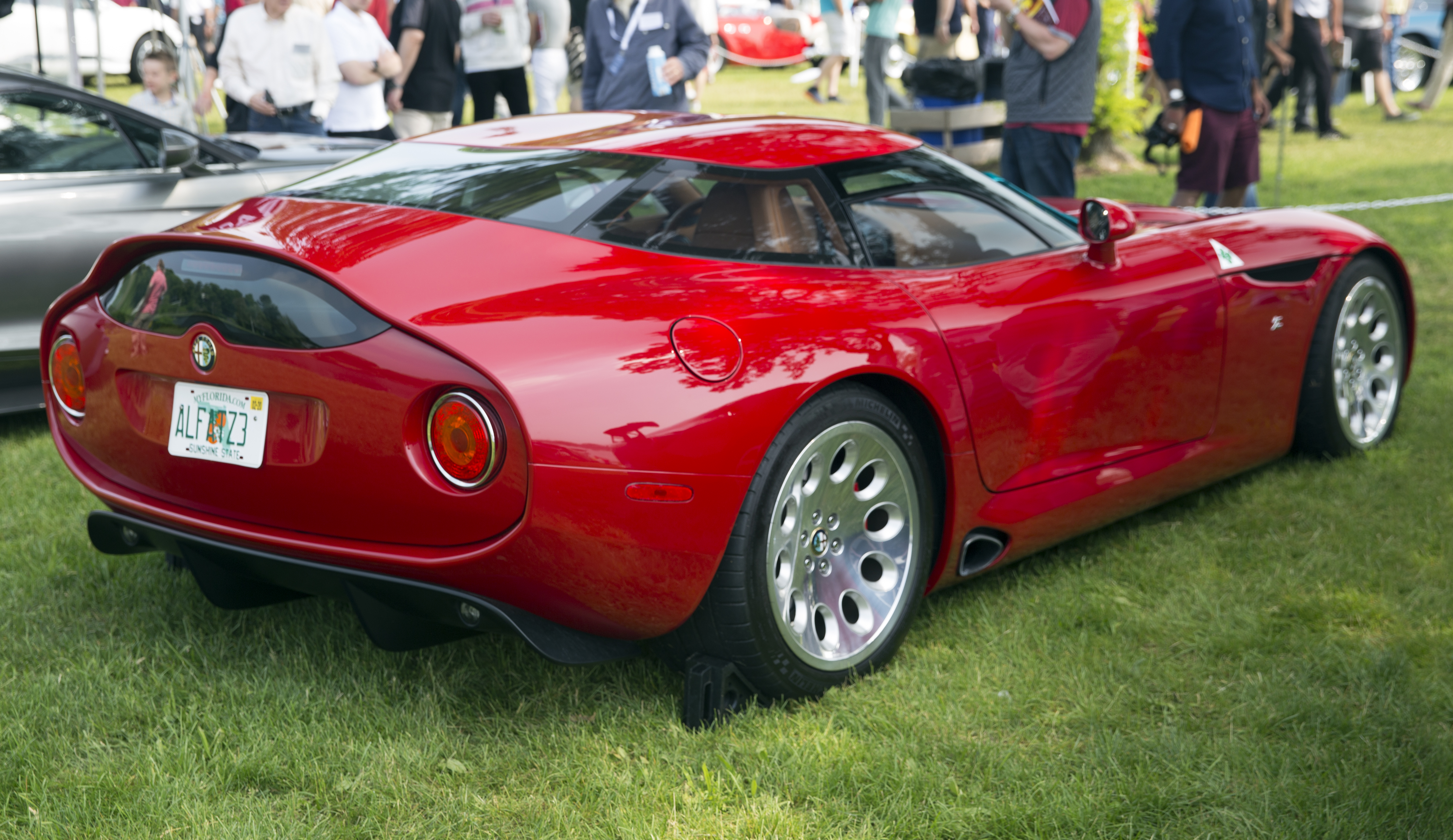
Rear view

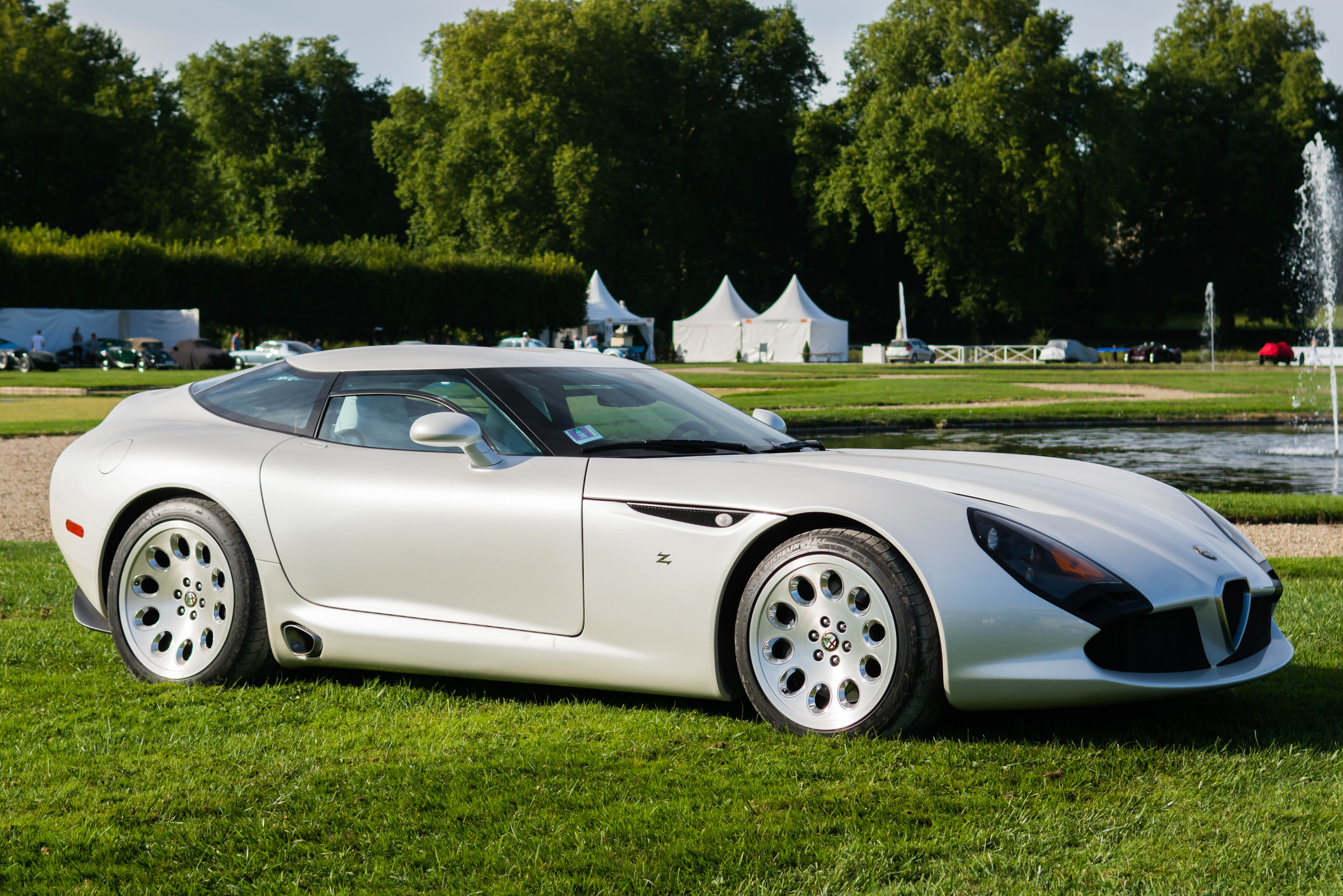
White TZ3 Stradale at the 2016 Chantilly Concours d'élégance

== See also ==
- Alfa Romeo in motorsport
- World Sportscar Championship
